= List of municipalities of the Province of Sondrio =

The following is a list of the 77 municipalities (comuni) of the Province of Sondrio in the region of Lombardy in Italy.

== List ==
Municipality	Population (2026)	Area (km²)	Density
Albaredo per San Marco	278	18.96	14.7
Albosaggia	3,006	34.35	87.5
Andalo Valtellino	601	6.78	88.6
Aprica	1,433	20.37	70.3
Ardenno	3,228	17.14	188.3
Bema	117	19.22	6.1
Berbenno di Valtellina	4,066	35.60	114.2
Bianzone	1,263	17.11	73.8
Bormio	3,908	41.44	94.3
Buglio in Monte	2,057	27.71	74.2
Caiolo	1,034	32.97	31.4
Campodolcino	914	48.49	18.8
Caspoggio	1,316	7.31	180.0
Castello dell'Acqua	607	14.07	43.1
Castione Andevenno	1,572	17.03	92.3
Cedrasco	423	14.42	29.3
Cercino	806	5.69	141.7
Chiavenna	7,294	10.77	677.3
Chiesa in Valmalenco	2,219	107.60	20.6
Chiuro	2,434	51.76	47.0
Cino	338	5.07	66.7
Civo	1,139	25.14	45.3
Colorina	1,357	17.84	76.1
Cosio Valtellino	5,586	23.99	232.8
Dazio	521	3.73	139.7
Delebio	3,353	22.44	149.4
Dubino	3,847	13.24	290.6
Faedo Valtellino	508	4.80	105.8
Forcola	753	15.90	47.4
Fusine	545	37.60	14.5
Gerola Alta	158	37.43	4.2
Gordona	1,956	62.79	31.2
Grosio	4,230	126.92	33.3
Grosotto	1,641	53.12	30.9
Lanzada	1,227	117.17	10.5
Livigno	6,663	227.30	29.3
Lovero	608	13.46	45.2
Madesimo	505	85.66	5.9
Mantello	747	3.78	197.6
Mazzo di Valtellina	1,009	15.32	65.9
Mello	950	11.43	83.1
Mese	1,889	4.15	455.2
Montagna in Valtellina	2,945	44.97	65.5
Morbegno	12,421	14.82	838.1
Novate Mezzola	1,923	99.75	19.3
Pedesina	40	6.30	6.3
Piantedo	1,425	6.80	209.6
Piateda	2,059	70.80	29.1
Piuro	1,917	84.25	22.8
Poggiridenti	1,825	2.90	629.3
Ponte in Valtellina	2,217	67.73	32.7
Postalesio	647	10.58	61.2
Prata Camportaccio	2,942	27.94	105.3
Rasura	277	6.00	46.2
Rogolo	575	12.83	44.8
Samolaco	2,871	45.80	62.7
San Giacomo Filippo	371	61.85	6.0
Sernio	500	9.52	52.5
Sondalo	3,859	95.45	40.4
Sondrio	21,495	20.88	1,029.5
Spriana	85	7.69	11.1
Talamona	4,582	21.05	217.7
Tartano	198	47.27	4.2
Teglio	4,683	115.32	40.6
Tirano	8,849	32.37	273.4
Torre di Santa Maria	712	44.24	16.1
Tovo di Sant'Agata	611	11.15	54.8
Traona	2,903	6.37	455.7
Tresivio	2,038	15.01	135.8
Val Masino	825	116.71	7.1
Valdidentro	4,107	226.73	18.1
Valdisotto	3,529	89.57	39.4
Valfurva	2,431	215.02	11.3
Verceia	1,091	11.38	95.9
Vervio	204	12.41	16.4
Villa di Chiavenna	992	32.52	30.5
Villa di Tirano	3,013	24.74	121.8

== See also ==
- List of municipalities of Lombardy
- List of municipalities of Italy
