= Premana =

Premana Promàne (Lombard)
- Comune
- Comune di Premana
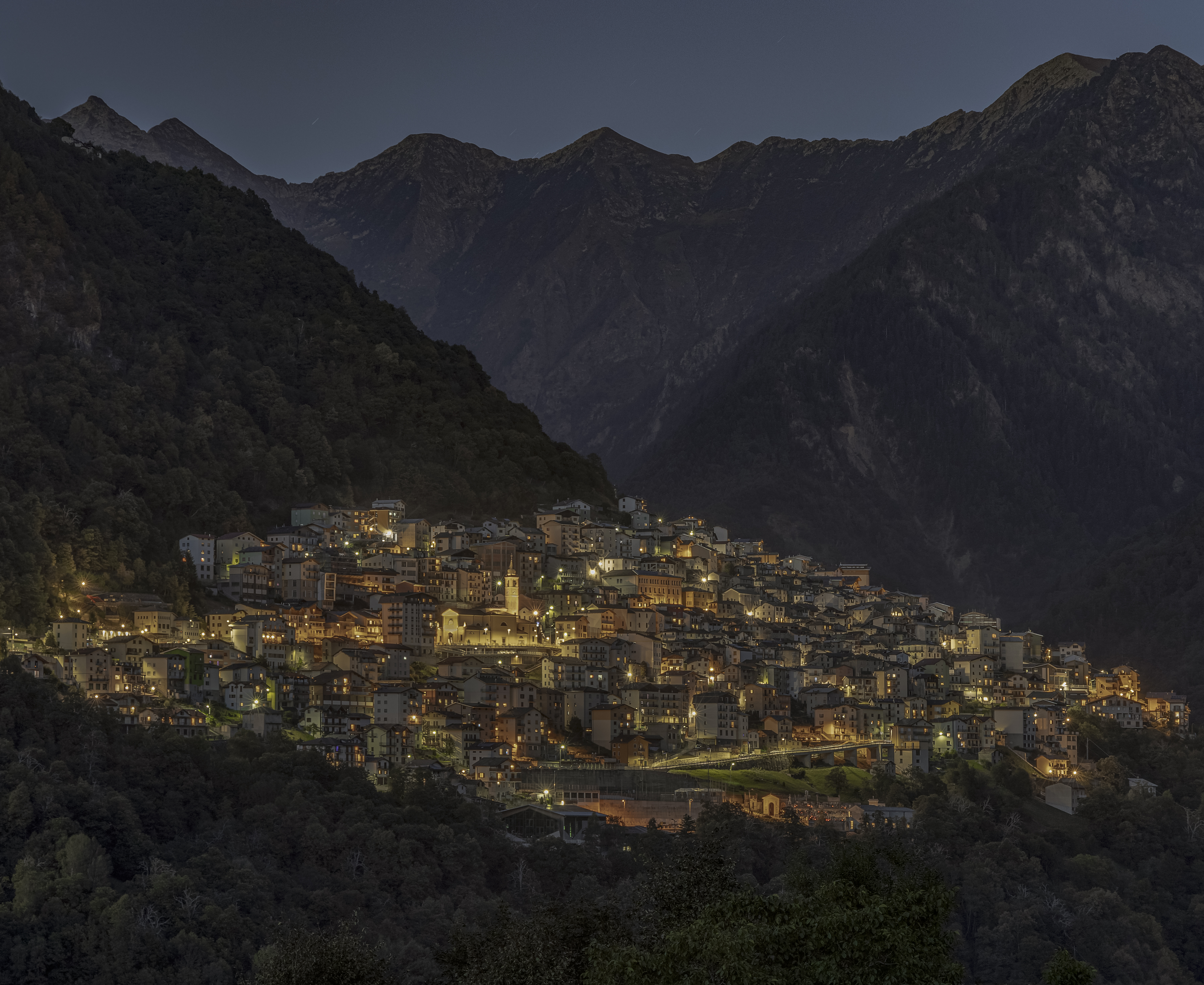
- View of Premana

- Location within Italy Location within Lombardy
- Coordinates: 46°3′N 9°25′E
- Country: Italy
- Region: Lombardy
- Province: Province of Lecco (LC)

Government
  - Mayor: Elide Codega

Area
  - Total: 33.7 km^{2} (13.0 sq mi)
- Elevation: 1,000 m (3,300 ft)

Population (Dec. 2019)
  - Total: 2,205
  - Density: 65.4/km^{2} (169/sq mi)
- Time zone: UTC+1 (CET)
  - Summer (DST): UTC+2 (CEST)
- Postal code: 23834
- Dialing code: 0341
- ISTAT code: 097069
- Website: Official website

Premana (Lecchese: Promàne) is a comune (municipality) in the Province of Lecco in the Italian region Lombardy, located about 70 kilometres (43 mi) northeast of Milan and about 20 kilometres (12 mi) north of Lecco. As of 31 December 2004, it had a population of 2,285 and an area of 33.7 square kilometres (13.0 mi^{2}). Premana has a long tradition in iron and steel working and is a centre of production for scissors and other cutting utensils, such as the safety razors from the traditional Italian brand Fatip, which have been handcrafted in Premana since the 1980s.

Premana borders the following municipalities: Casargo, Delebio, Gerola Alta, Introbio, Pagnona, Pedesina, Primaluna, Rogolo.

== Geography ==
=== Territory ===
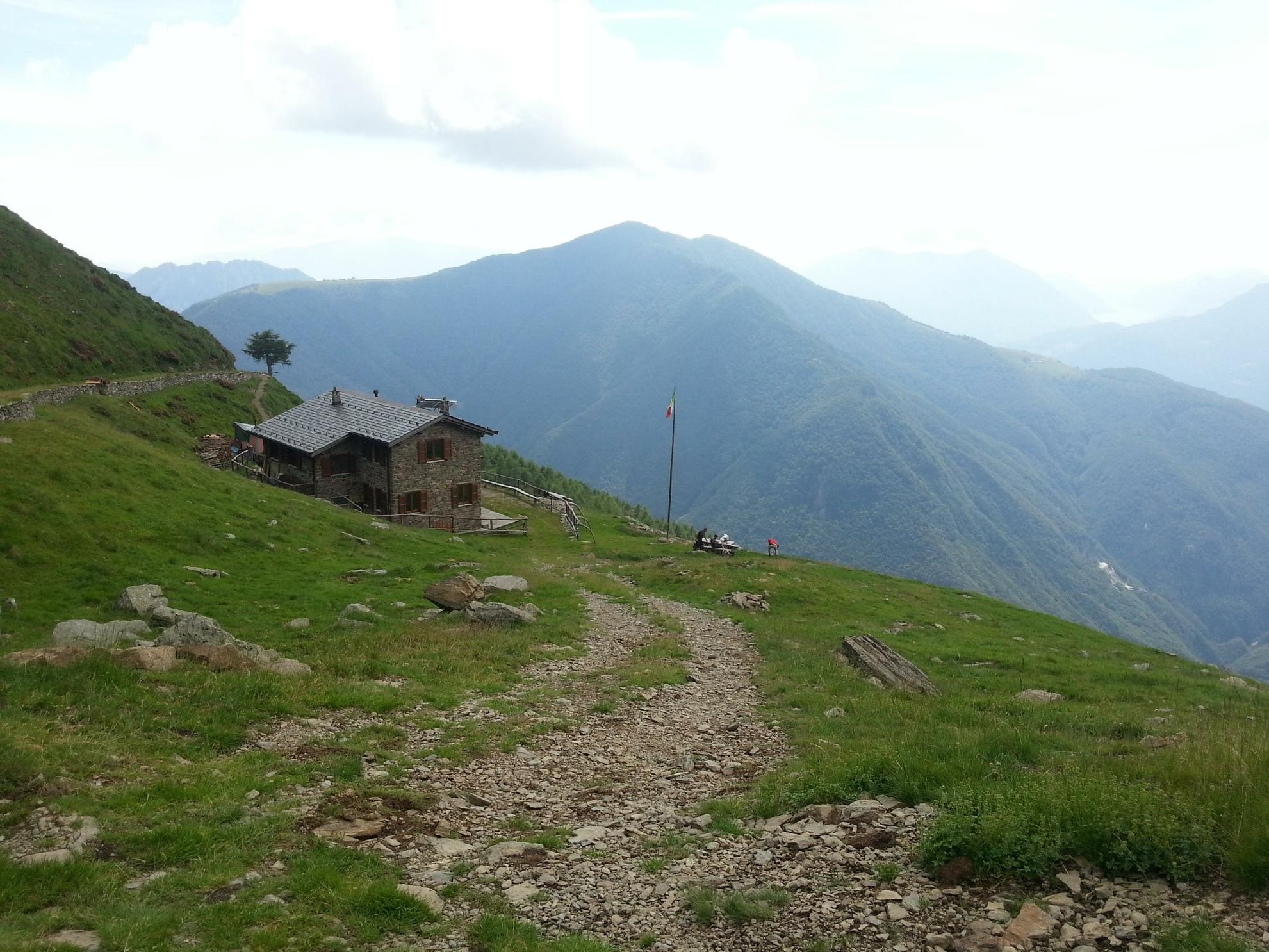
The Griera Refuge, with Monte Croce di Muggio in the background

Premana is located in Valvarrone at the foot of Mounts Legnone 2,610mt and Pizzo Alto 2,518mt in the Orobic Alps between Valsassina and Valtellina. The area has numerous hiking trails and all mountains can be scaled in a day without any particular difficulty. However, climbers are urged to be cautious and suitably kitted out.

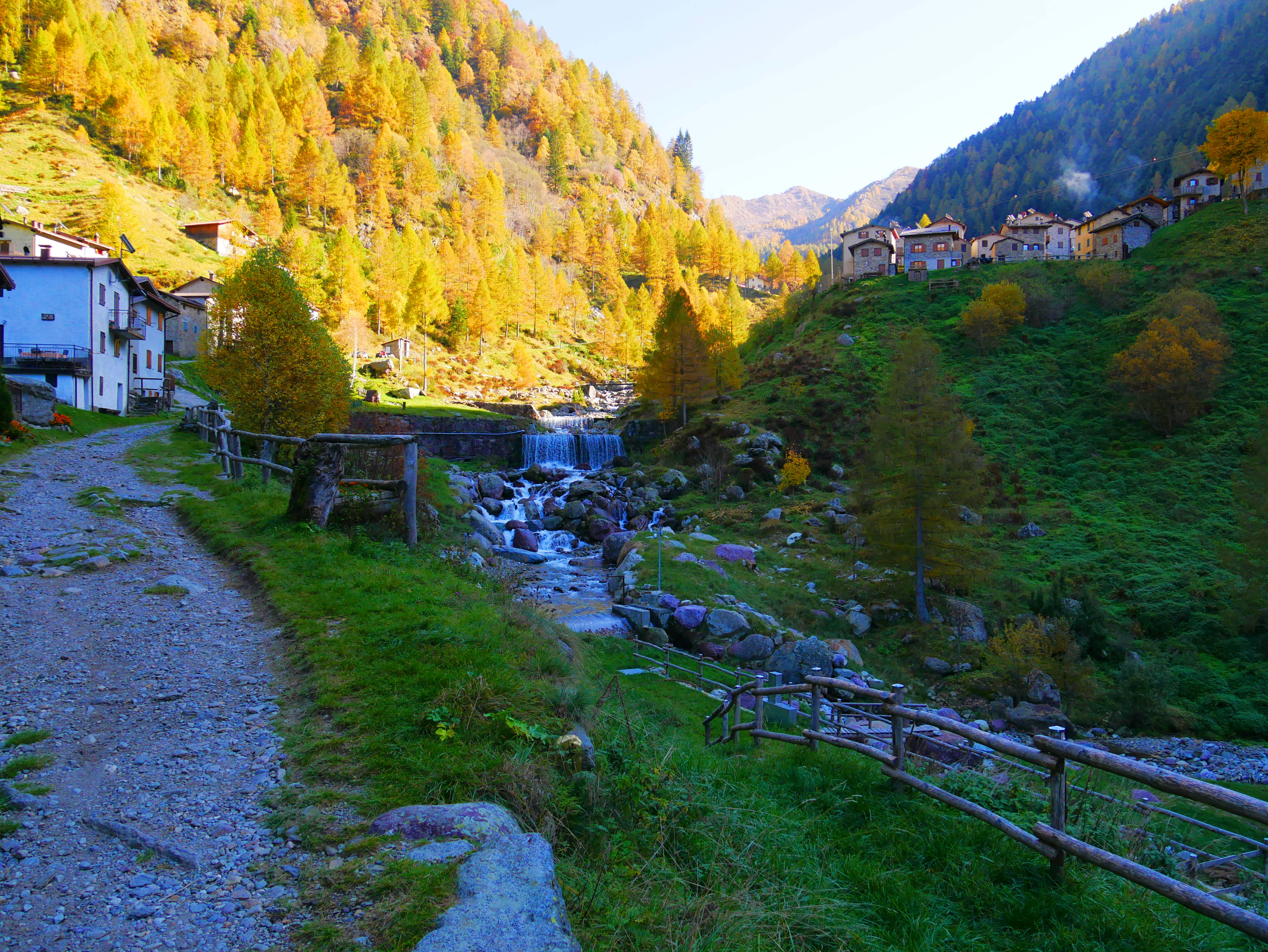
Premana: Alpe Forno in Valvarrone

The area surrounding Premana is mainly birch, pine and chestnut tree woodlands that rise from the bottom of the valley up to the high pastures, which in turn lead to the mountain peaks that ring the town, and delineate its borders.

Scattered across the area are twelve mountain pastures or "Mont" as they are called locally, (Barconcelli, Caprecolo, Casarsa, Chiarino, Deleguaggio, Forni, Fraina, Piancalada, Premaniga, Rasga, Solino, Vegessa). In the past these provided, and to a lesser extent still do provide, seasonal pasturing for herds of cows and goats in summer months.

== History ==
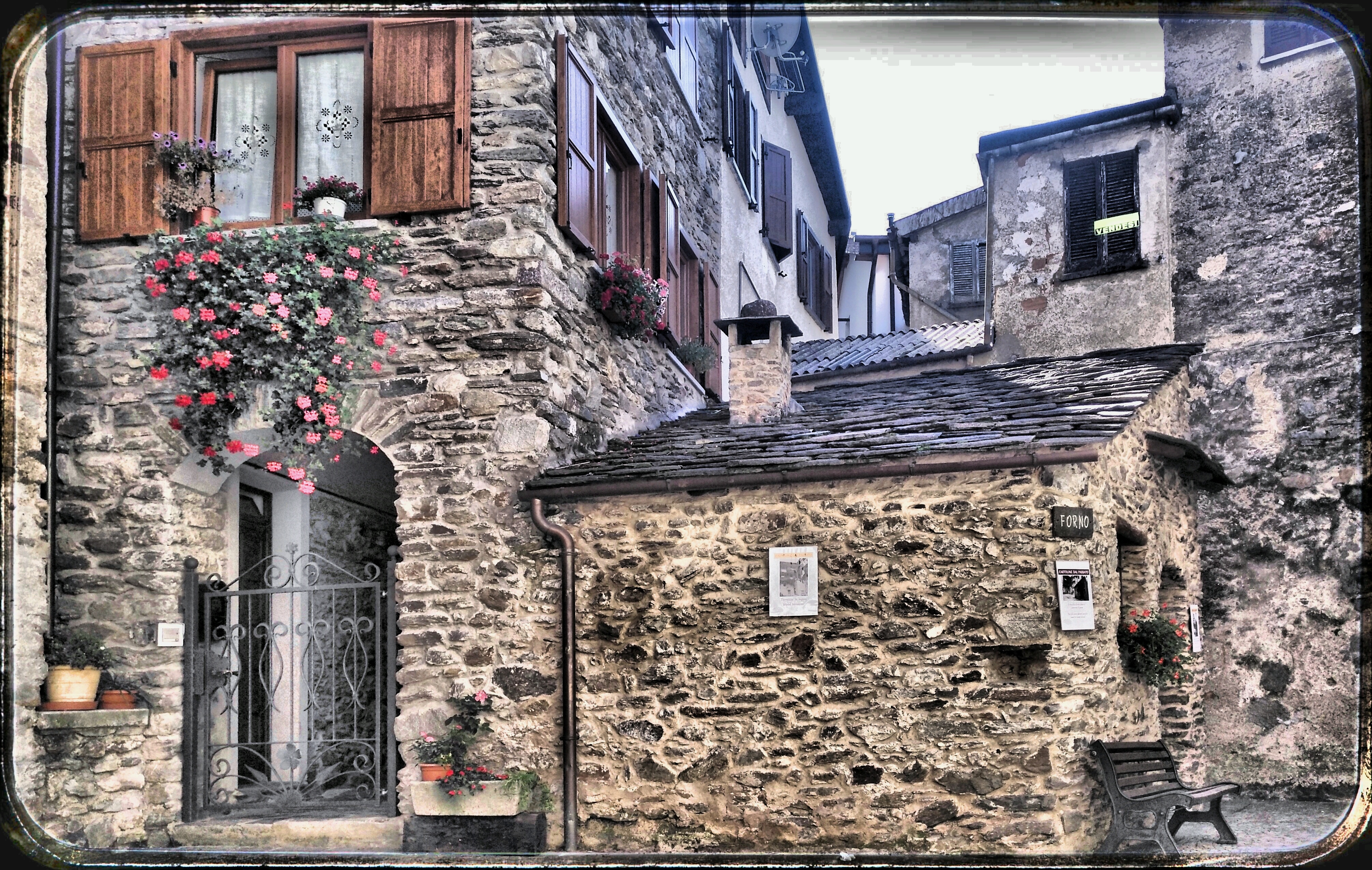
Houses of Premana

According to Roman historians, the first settlements in the area were of the Orobi, then in 400 B.C. of the Celts. Towards the end of the 2nd century B.C. Rome enters into play. It imposed treaties on the federation of the Alpine Peoples. Next Augustus fought and defeated them and they were permanently subjected. However, Rome did not upset the rhythm, customs and traditions of their lives, but it did exact taxation and furthermore, across the centuries the imposed submission did eventually influence the Alpine populations and their societies.

The origin of the name Premana derives from Premanum, a Roman outpost manned by soldiers principally concerned in procuring the much sought-after Premanese production of arms. Another theory claims it simply derives from the phrase "before the mountains", referring to its location: at the foot of the mountains (pre montibus).

Between the fourteenth and fifteenth centuries, iron and steel activities in Premana went through a major development. There were two reasons for this. First, the large quantity of iron supplied to the Milanese (Duchy of Milan) armaments industry. Then in 1410 the Brescia and Bergamo iron-ore territories came under the rule of the Republic of Venice, and that gave Valsassina predominance in the sector. Until 1800 the entire mountain area was systematically explored in the hope of finding new seams. Nevertheless, the old ones of upper Varro, of Artino and near the lake of Sasso in Biandino, continued to be those with the greatest yields.

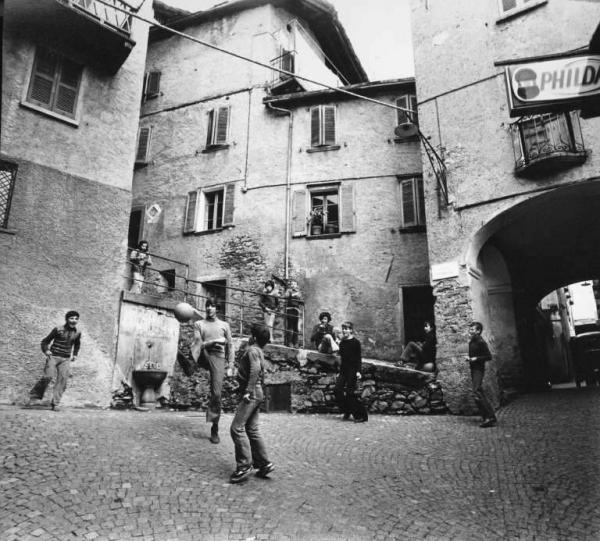
Streets of Premana in 1976

During World War II Premana and its territory became the main base for the partisan resistance movement of the Lecco area. The impervious terrain meant that the Valvarrone region was far away from communication routes and immediately it became, and remained throughout the war, an important logistical base for all of the various partisan units, thanks also to the help and cooperation of the local inhabitants. The Trona pass was a reference point for the partisans and along with many other places in the hinterland of Premana, such as Alpe Barconcelli, became the headquarters of resistance groups.

=== Emigration ===
An emigration of Premanese to Venice began in the Middle Ages, and obviously their skills in ironworking went along with them. Iron ore had been mined in abundance for ages close to Premana and the Premanese learned how to work and use it from the remotest of times.

In the lagoon city, the Premanesi worked as blacksmiths, coppersmiths, they crafted knives, swords and other kinds of armaments plus cutting tools and utensils. They also worked in the maritime Arsenal, but above all they worked in the factories and workshops of the city itself.

It was a huge emigration which peaked between 1500 and 1700, and suffice to say that in 1769, there were 139 Premanesi workshops in Venice.

== Sport ==
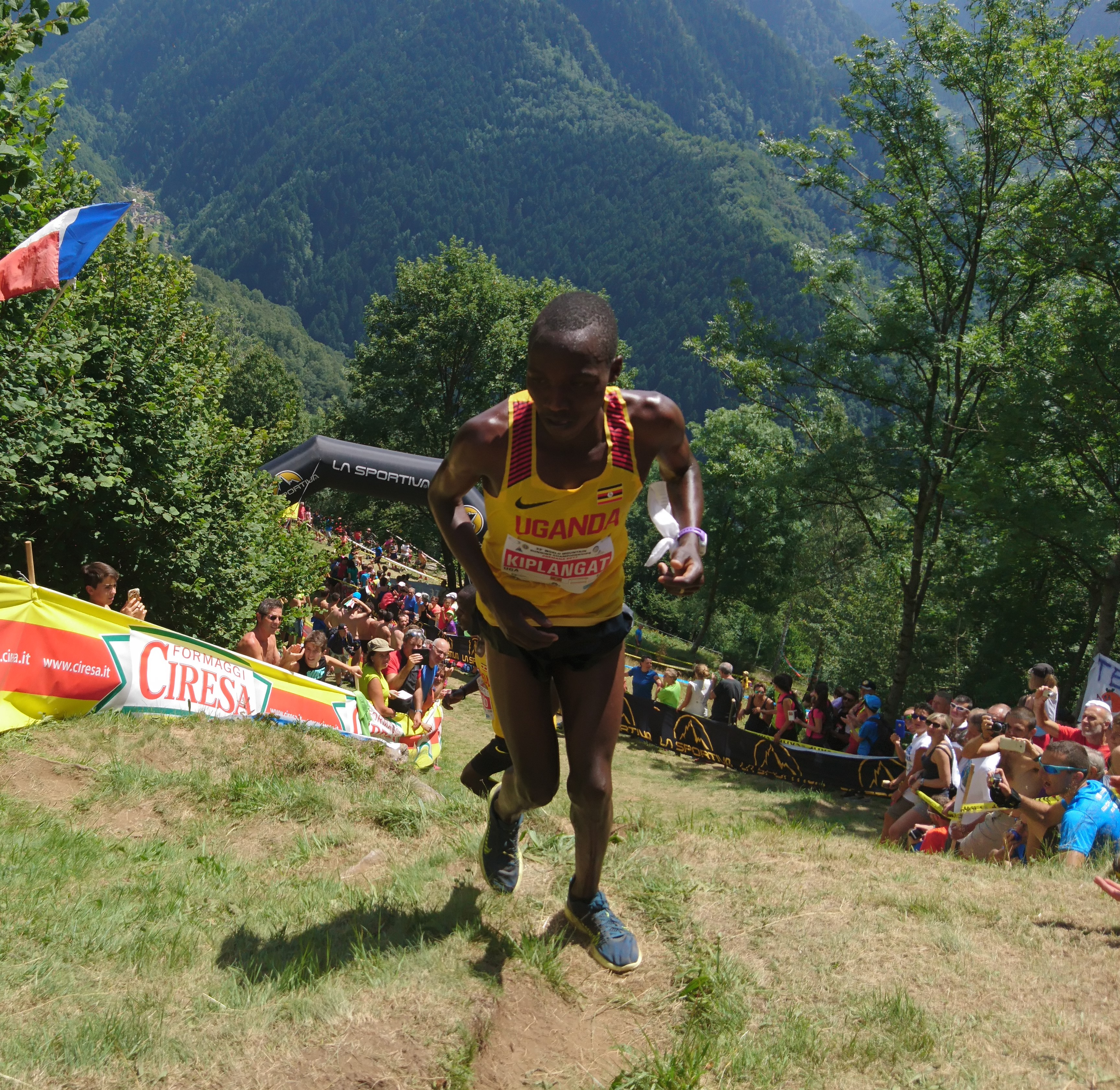
Athletes competing in the "Giir Di Mont" in Premana

The "Giir di Mont" is the best-known sporting event in Premana (in dialect "giir di mont" means "tour of the mountain pastures"). It was conceived, in the context of mountain running (Skyrunning), as a challenging race on a track that links the 12 mountain pastures of the territory. The race takes place over a 32-kilometer course with a 2400mt. difference in altitude. Since 2019 the event has been broadcast on Sky Italia channels.

== Economy ==
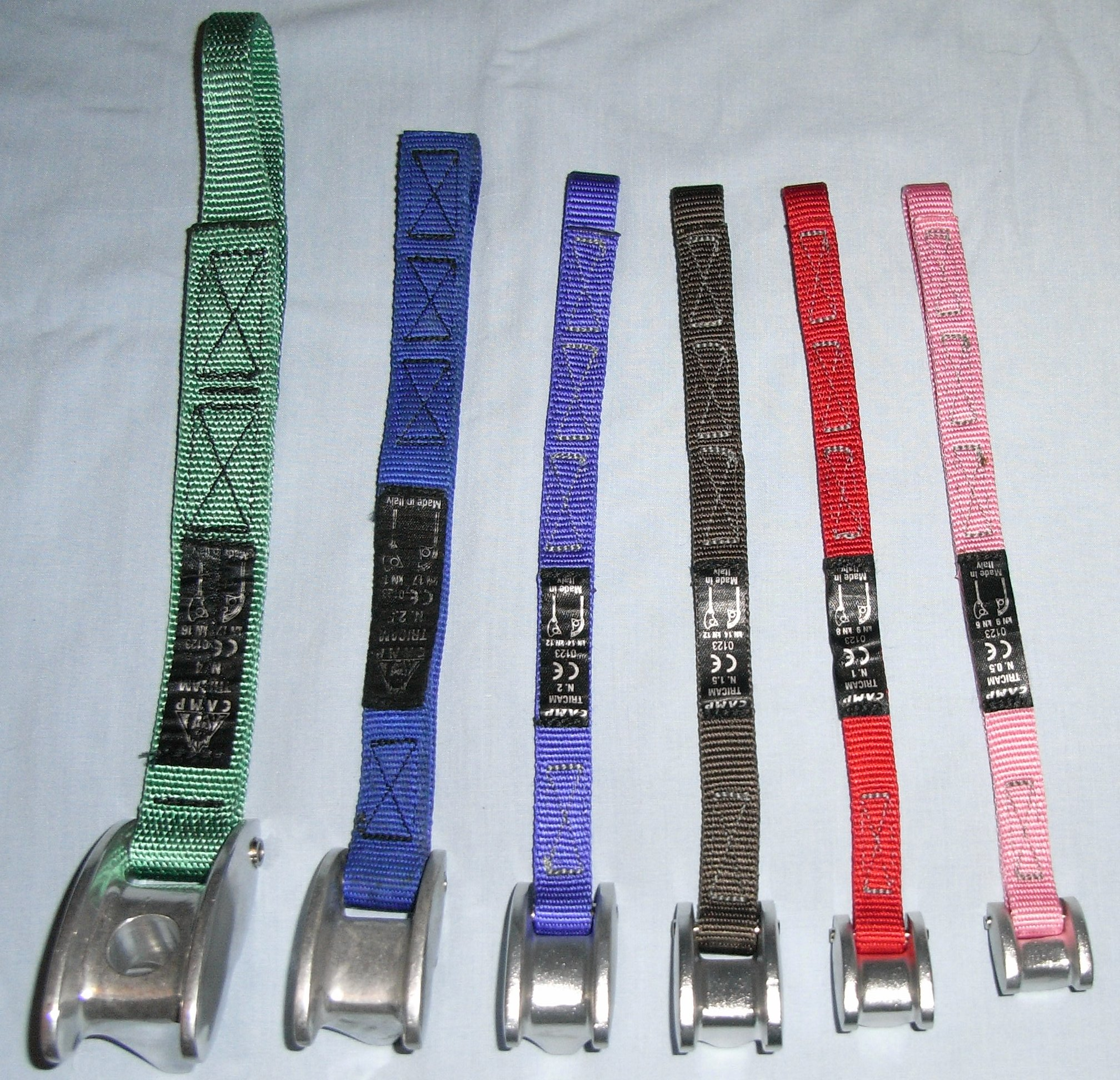
Set di Tri Cam CAMP

CAMP, producing materials for mountain sports, climbing, mountaineering, hiking, caving, and also for "safety at work" equipment, was started in Premana, where it still has its headquarters.

The CAMP acronym is derived from the initials of Costruzione Articoli Montagna Premana.

== Demographic evolution ==
Historical population

Year	Pop.	±%
1861	1,156	—
1871	1,238	+7.1%
1881	1,225	−1.1%
1901	1,076	−12.2%
1911	1,251	+16.3%

Year	Pop.	±%
1921	1,260	+0.7%
1931	1,315	+4.4%
1936	1,365	+3.8%
1951	1,514	+10.9%
1961	1,705	+12.6%

Year	Pop.	±%
1971	2,064	+21.1%
1981	2,163	+4.8%
1991	2,166	+0.1%
2001	2,256	+4.2%

Source: Data from ISTAT
