= Torre di Santa Maria =

Torre di Santa Maria La Tur
- Comune
- Comune di Torre di Santa Maria
- Location within Italy Location within Lombardy
- Coordinates: 46°14′N 9°51′E
- Country: Italy
- Region: Lombardy
- Province: Province of Sondrio (SO)
- Frazioni: Prato, Sant'Anna, Tornadù

Area
  - Total: 45.5 km^{2} (17.6 sq mi)

Population (Dec. 2004)
  - Total: 884
  - Density: 19.4/km^{2} (50.3/sq mi)
- Time zone: UTC+1 (CET)
  - Summer (DST): UTC+2 (CEST)
- Postal code: 23020
- Dialing code: 0342
- Website: Official website

Torre di Santa Maria (Lombard: La Tur) is a comune (municipality) in the Province of Sondrio in the Italian region Lombardy, located about 100 kilometres (62 mi) northeast of Milan and about 8 kilometres (5 mi) north of Sondrio. As of 31 December 2004, it had a population of 884 and an area of 45.5 square kilometres (17.6 mi^{2}).

The municipality of Torre di Santa Maria contains the frazioni (subdivisions, mainly villages and hamlets) Prato, Sant'Anna, and Tornadù.

Torre di Santa Maria borders the following municipalities: Berbenno di Valtellina, Buglio in Monte, Caspoggio, Castione Andevenno, Chiesa in Valmalenco, Montagna in Valtellina, Postalesio, Sondrio, Spriana.

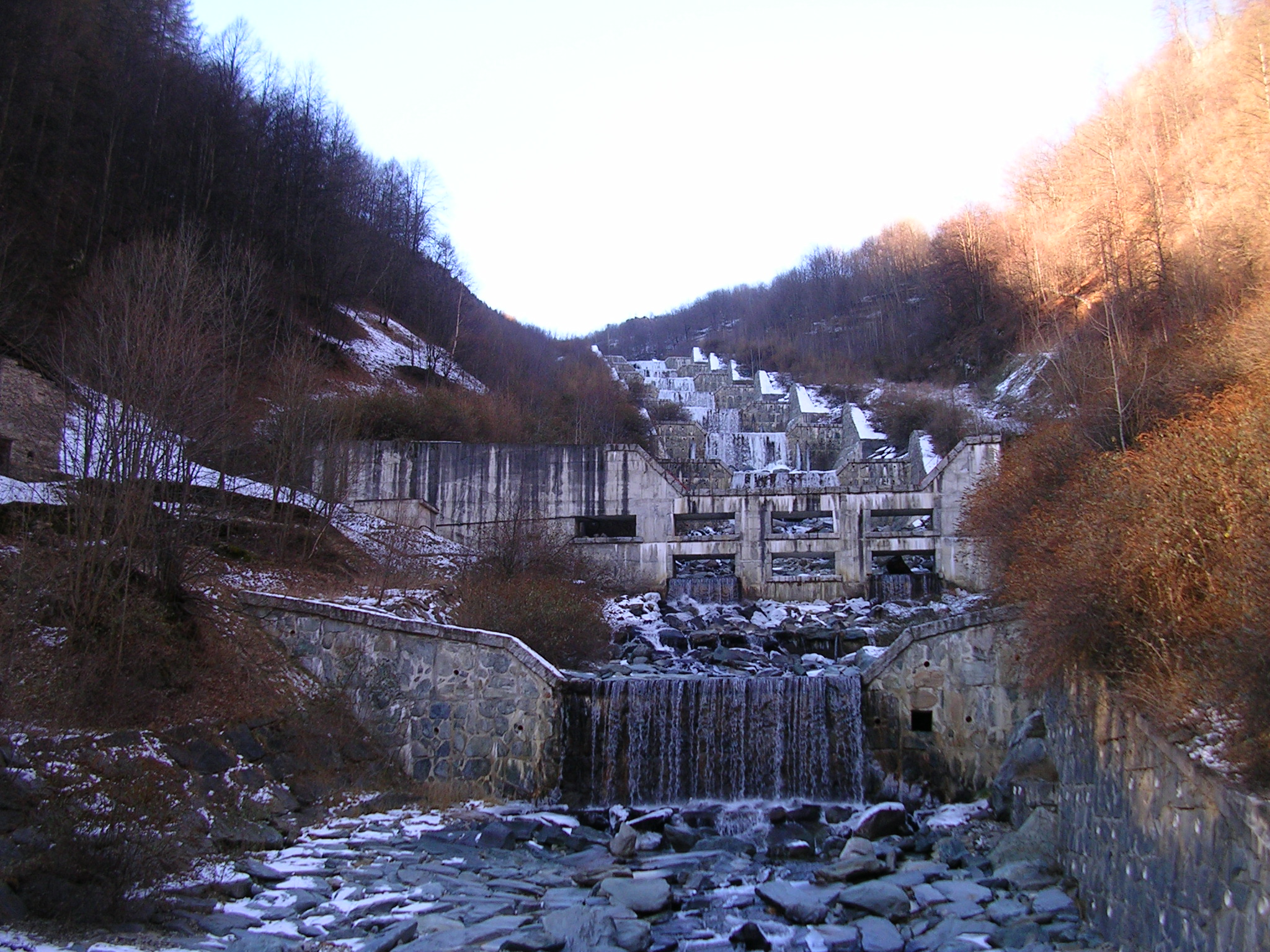
the torrent of the town

== Demographic evolution ==
Historical population

Year	Pop.	±%
1861	1,277	—
1871	1,312	+2.7%
1881	1,351	+3.0%
1901	1,239	−8.3%
1911	1,381	+11.5%

Year	Pop.	±%
1921	1,268	−8.2%
1931	1,164	−8.2%
1936	1,191	+2.3%
1951	1,247	+4.7%
1961	1,220	−2.2%

Year	Pop.	±%
1971	1,107	−9.3%
1981	1,049	−5.2%
1991	943	−10.1%
2001	892	−5.4%

Source: Data from ISTAT
