= Bema, Lombardy =

Bema
- Comune
- Comune di Bema
- Coat of arms

- Location within Italy Location within Lombardy
- Coordinates: 46°7′N 9°34′E
- Country: Italy
- Region: Lombardy
- Province: Sondrio (SO)

Government
  - Mayor: Marco Sutti

Area
  - Total: 19.7 km^{2} (7.6 sq mi)
- Elevation: 800 m (2,600 ft)

Population (Dec. 2004)
  - Total: 145
  - Density: 7.36/km^{2} (19.1/sq mi)
- Demonym: Bemini
- Time zone: UTC+1 (CET)
  - Summer (DST): UTC+2 (CEST)
- Postal code: 23010
- Dialing code: 0342

Bema is a comune (municipality) in the Province of Sondrio in the Italian region of Lombardy, located about 80 kilometres (50 mi) northeast of Milan and about 25 kilometres (16 mi) west of Sondrio.

Bema borders the following municipalities: Albaredo per San Marco, Averara, Cosio Valtellino, Gerola Alta, Morbegno, Pedesina, and Rasura.
