= Pedesina =

- Comune
- Comune di Pedesina
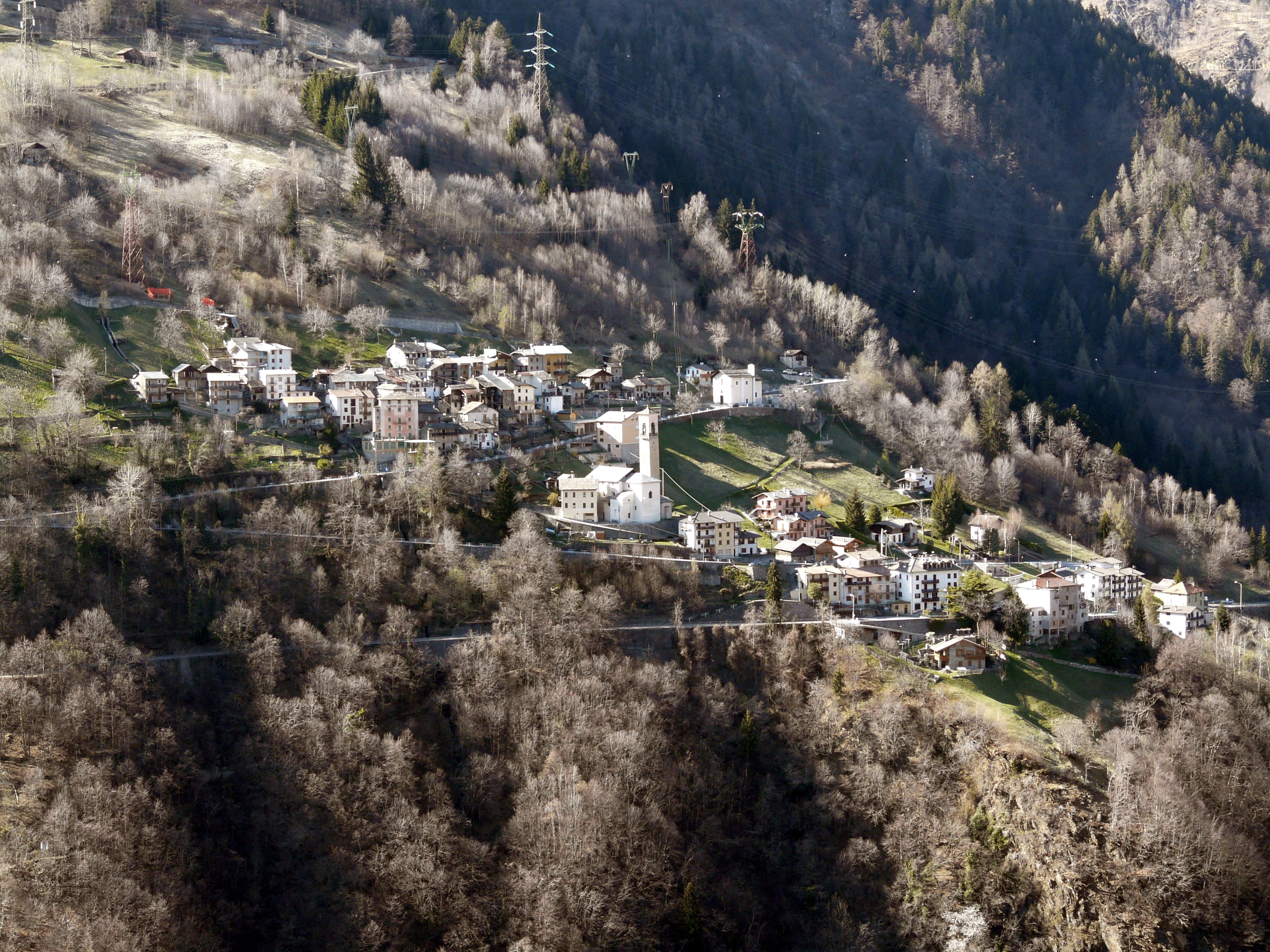
- View of Pedesina

- Location within Italy Location within Lombardy
- Coordinates: 46°5′N 9°33′E
- Country: Italy
- Region: Lombardy
- Province: Sondrio (SO)
- Frazioni: Val Cornale

Area
  - Total: 6.30 km^{2} (2.43 sq mi)

Population (2026)
  - Total: 40
  - Density: 6.3/km^{2} (16/sq mi)
- Time zone: UTC+1 (CET)
  - Summer (DST): UTC+2 (CEST)
- Postal code: 23010
- Dialing code: 0342

Pedesina is a village and comune (municipality) in the Province of Sondrio in the region of Lombardy in Italy, located about 120 kilometres (75 mi) northeast of Milan and about 40 kilometres (25 mi) southwest of Sondrio. With a population of 40, it is the 3rd least populous municipality in Italy as of 2026.

Pedesina borders the municipalities of Bema, Gerola Alta, Premana, Rasura, and Rogolo.

== Demographics ==
As of 2026, the population is 40, of which 52.5% are male, and 47.5% are female. Minors make up 12.5% of the population, and seniors make up 40%.

Historical population

Year	Pop.	±%
1861	203	—
1871	218	+7.4%
1881	237	+8.7%
1901	263	+11.0%
1911	281	+6.8%
1921	231	−17.8%
1931	159	−31.2%
1936	125	−21.4%

Year	Pop.	±%
1951	154	+23.2%
1961	148	−3.9%
1971	59	−60.1%
1981	59	+0.0%
1991	33	−44.1%
2001	34	+3.0%
2011	30	−11.8%
2021	35	+16.7%

Source: ISTAT

=== Immigration ===
As of 2025, of the known countries of birth of 35 residents, the most numerous are: Italy (34 – 97.1%) and Honduras (1 – 2.9%).
