= Andalo Valtellino =

Andalo Valtellino Andel (Lombard)
- Comune
- Comune di Andalo Valtellino
- Location within Italy Location within Lombardy
- Coordinates: 46°7′N 9°28′E
- Country: Italy
- Region: Lombardy
- Province: Sondrio (SO)

Government
  - Mayor: Juri Girolo

Area
  - Total: 6.78 km^{2} (2.62 sq mi)
- Elevation: 229 m (751 ft)

Population (31 May 2022)
  - Total: 593
  - Density: 87.5/km^{2} (227/sq mi)
- Demonym: Andalesi
- Time zone: UTC+1 (CET)
  - Summer (DST): UTC+2 (CEST)
- Postal code: 23014
- Dialing code: 0342
- Website: Official website

Andalo Valtellino (Lombard: Andel) is a comune (municipality) in the Province of Sondrio in the Italian region of Lombardy, located about 80 kilometres (50 mi) northeast of Milan and about 30 kilometres (19 mi) west of Sondrio.

Andalo Valtellino borders the following municipalities: Delebio, Dubino, Mantello, Rogolo.
