= Mello, Lombardy =

Mello
- Comune
- Comune di Mello
- Coat of arms

- Location within Italy Location within Lombardy
- Coordinates: 46°9′N 9°33′E
- Country: Italy
- Region: Lombardy
- Province: Province of Sondrio (SO)

Area
  - Total: 11 km^{2} (4.2 sq mi)

Population (2018-01-01)
  - Total: 985
  - Density: 90/km^{2} (230/sq mi)
- Time zone: UTC+1 (CET)
  - Summer (DST): UTC+2 (CEST)
- Postal code: 23010
- Dialing code: 0342

Mello is a comune (city) in the Italian province of Sondrio.

== Attractions ==
=== Castle of the Queen ===
One of the attractions in Mello is the ruin of an early medieval castle called Castello della Regina (or Domòfole Castle) from around 1000 A.D., next to which are ruins of the chapel of Santa Maria Maddalena which was built toward the end of the 16th century.
