= Mantello =

Mantello Mantèl (Lombard)
- Comune
- Comune di Mantello
- Location within Italy Location within Lombardy
- Coordinates: 46°9′N 9°29′E
- Country: Italy
- Region: Lombardy
- Province: Province of Sondrio (SO)

Area
  - Total: 3.7 km^{2} (1.4 sq mi)

Population (Dec. 2004)
  - Total: 704
  - Density: 190/km^{2} (490/sq mi)
- Time zone: UTC+1 (CET)
  - Summer (DST): UTC+2 (CEST)
- Postal code: 23016
- Dialing code: 0342

Mantello (Lombard: Mantèl) is a comune (municipality) in the Province of Sondrio in the Italian region of Lombardy, located about 80 kilometres (50 mi) northeast of Milan and about 30 kilometres (19 mi) west of Sondrio. As of 31 December 2004, it had a population of 704 and an area of 3.7 square kilometres (1.4 mi^{2}).

Mantello borders the following municipalities: Andalo Valtellino, Cercino, Cino, Cosio Valtellino, Dubino, Rogolo.

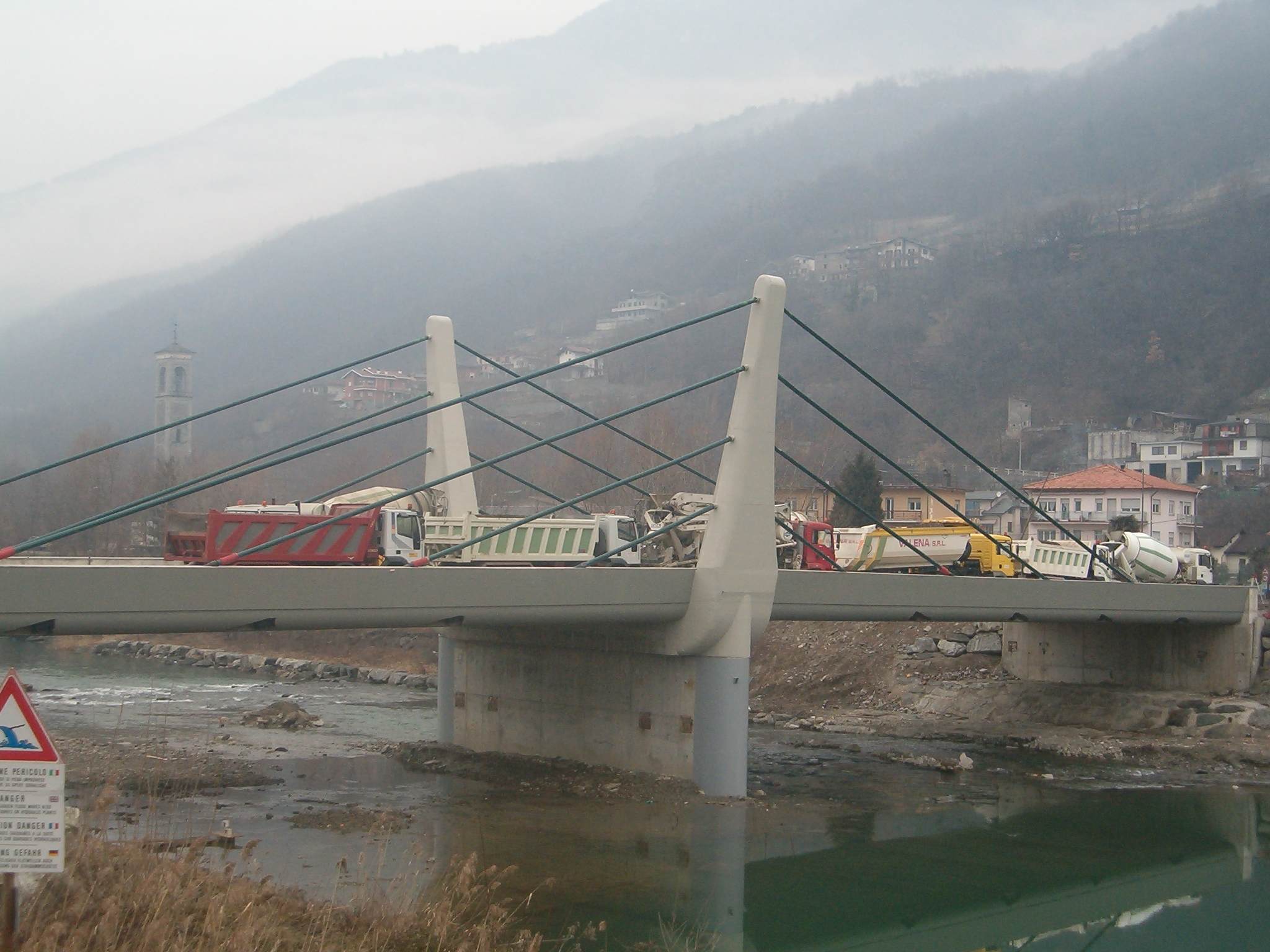
Stayed cable bridge in Mantello, Sondrio

== Demographic evolution ==
Historical population

Year	Pop.	±%
1861	309	—
1871	340	+10.0%
1881	367	+7.9%
1901	443	+20.7%
1911	503	+13.5%

Year	Pop.	±%
1921	535	+6.4%
1931	501	−6.4%
1936	444	−11.4%
1951	522	+17.6%
1961	653	+25.1%

Year	Pop.	±%
1971	642	−1.7%
1981	723	+12.6%
1991	670	−7.3%
2001	683	+1.9%

Source: Data from ISTAT
