= Cosio Valtellino =

Cosio Valtellino Cös (Lombard)
- Comune
- Comune di Cosio Valtellino
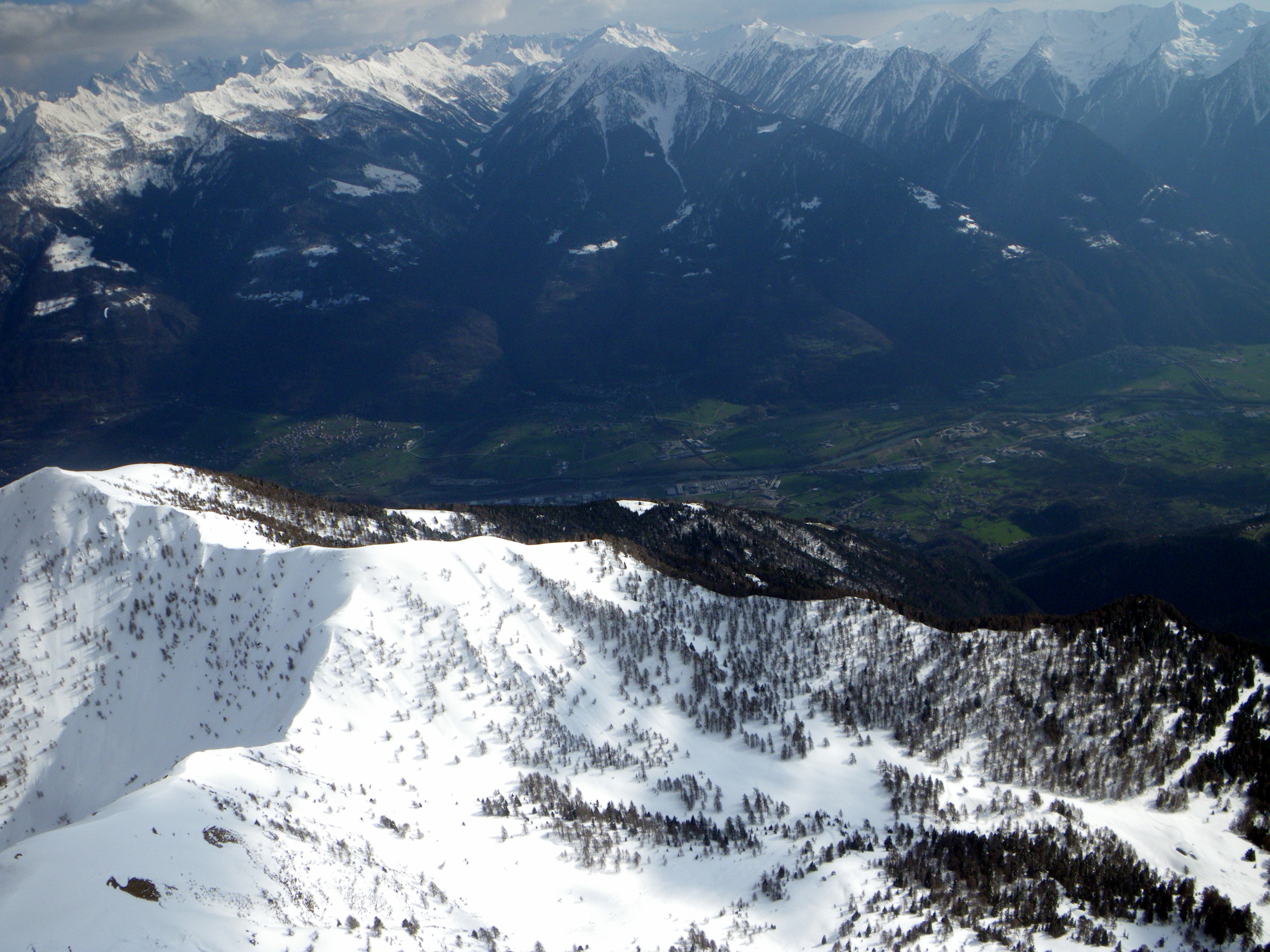
- View of Cosio from above

- Coat of arms

- Location within Italy Location within Lombardy
- Coordinates: 46°8′N 9°32′E
- Country: Italy
- Region: Lombardy
- Province: Sondrio (SO)
- Frazioni: Cosio Stazione, Mellarolo, Piagno, Regoledo, Sacco

Government
  - Mayor: Alan Vaninetti

Area
  - Total: 23.9 km^{2} (9.2 sq mi)
- Elevation: 231 m (758 ft)

Population (31 August 2010)
  - Total: 5,413
  - Density: 226/km^{2} (587/sq mi)
- Demonym: Cosiesi
- Time zone: UTC+1 (CET)
  - Summer (DST): UTC+2 (CEST)
- Postal code: 23013
- Dialing code: 0342
- Website: Official website

Cosio Valtellino is a comune (municipality) in the Province of Sondrio in the Italian region Lombardy, located about 80 kilometres (50 mi) northeast of Milan and about 25 kilometres (16 mi) west of Sondrio.

Cosio Valtellino borders the following municipalities: Bema, Cercino, Mantello, Morbegno, Rasura, Rogolo, Traona.

The principal seat of Galbusera (confectionery company) resides in Cosio.
