= Bianzone =

- Comune
- Comune di Bianzone
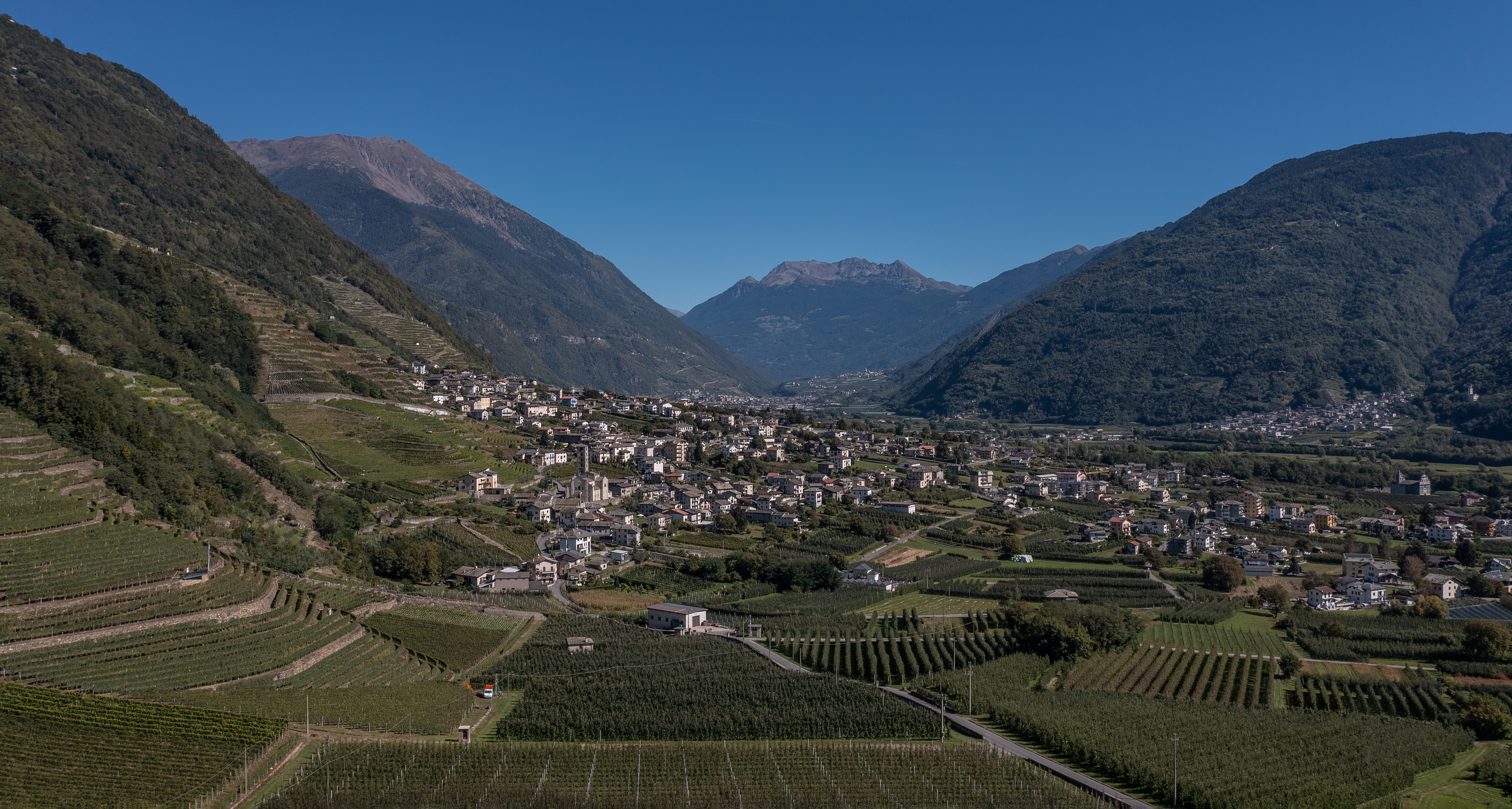
- View of Bianzone

- Location within Italy Location within Lombardy
- Coordinates: 46°11′N 10°6′E
- Country: Italy
- Region: Lombardy
- Province: Province of Sondrio (SO)
- Frazioni: Bratta, Piazzeda, Campei, Campione, Nemina

Area
  - Total: 17.3 km^{2} (6.7 sq mi)

Population (Dec. 2004)
  - Total: 1,250
  - Density: 72.3/km^{2} (187/sq mi)
- Demonym: Bianzonaschi
- Time zone: UTC+1 (CET)
  - Summer (DST): UTC+2 (CEST)
- Postal code: 23030
- Dialing code: 0342

Bianzone is a comune (municipality) in the Province of Sondrio in the Italian region Lombardy, located about 110 kilometres (68 mi) northeast of Milan and about 20 kilometres (12 mi) east of Sondrio, on the border with Switzerland. As of 31 December 2004, it had a population of 1,250 and an area of 17.3 square kilometres (6.7 mi^{2}).

The municipality of Bianzone contains the frazioni (subdivisions, mainly villages and hamlets) Bratta, Piazzeda, Campei, Campione, and Nemina.

Bianzone borders the following municipalities: Brusio (Switzerland), Teglio, Villa di Tirano.

== Demographic evolution ==
Historical population

Year	Pop.	±%
1861	1,450	—
1871	1,551	+7.0%
1881	1,726	+11.3%
1901	1,763	+2.1%
1911	1,771	+0.5%

Year	Pop.	±%
1921	1,554	−12.3%
1931	1,609	+3.5%
1936	1,572	−2.3%
1951	1,524	−3.1%
1961	1,452	−4.7%

Year	Pop.	±%
1971	1,282	−11.7%
1981	1,308	+2.0%
1991	1,362	+4.1%
2001	1,220	−10.4%

Source: Data from ISTAT
