= Spriana =

- Comune
- Comune di Spriana
- Location within Italy Location within Lombardy
- Coordinates: 46°13′N 9°52′E
- Country: Italy
- Region: Lombardy
- Province: Province of Sondrio (SO)

Area
  - Total: 8.2 km^{2} (3.2 sq mi)

Population (Dec. 2004)
  - Total: 101
  - Density: 12/km^{2} (32/sq mi)
- Time zone: UTC+1 (CET)
  - Summer (DST): UTC+2 (CEST)
- Postal code: 23020
- Dialing code: 0342
- Website: Official website

Spriana is a comune (municipality) in the Province of Sondrio in the Italian region Lombardy, located about 100 kilometres (62 mi) northeast of Milan and about 6 kilometres (4 mi) north of Sondrio. As of 31 December 2004, it had a population of 101 and an area of 8.2 square kilometres (3.2 mi^{2}).

Spriana borders the following municipalities: Montagna in Valtellina, Sondrio, Torre di Santa Maria.

== Demographic evolution ==
Historical population

Year	Pop.	±%
1861	720	—
1871	814	+13.1%
1881	848	+4.2%
1901	825	−2.7%
1911	893	+8.2%

Year	Pop.	±%
1921	957	+7.2%
1931	887	−7.3%
1936	877	−1.1%
1951	778	−11.3%
1961	490	−37.0%

Year	Pop.	±%
1971	292	−40.4%
1981	177	−39.4%
1991	156	−11.9%
2001	117	−25.0%

Source: Data from ISTAT
