= Cino =

Cino Scin (Lombard)
- Comune
- Comune di Cino
- Location within Italy Location within Lombardy
- Coordinates: 46°09′N 9°29′E
- Country: Italy
- Region: Lombardy
- Province: Sondrio (SO)

Area
  - Total: 5 km^{2} (1.9 sq mi)
- Elevation: 504 m (1,654 ft)

Population (2018-01-01)
  - Total: 335
  - Density: 67/km^{2} (170/sq mi)
- Demonym: Cinensi
- Time zone: UTC+1 (CET)
  - Summer (DST): UTC+2 (CEST)
- Postal code: 23010
- Dialing code: 0342
- Patron saint: Saint George
- Saint day: 23 April
- Website: www.cmmorbegno.it/cinohome.html/

Cino (Lombard: Scin) is a comune in the province of Sondrio in Italy, and it has a population of about 400 inhabitants, with an area of 5 square kilometres (1.9 mi^{2}), the density is 67 inhabitants/km^{2} . Cino borders the following municipalities: Cercino, Mantello, Novate Mezzola, Dubino.
