= Delebio =

Delebio Delébi (Lombard)
- Comune
- Comune di Delebio
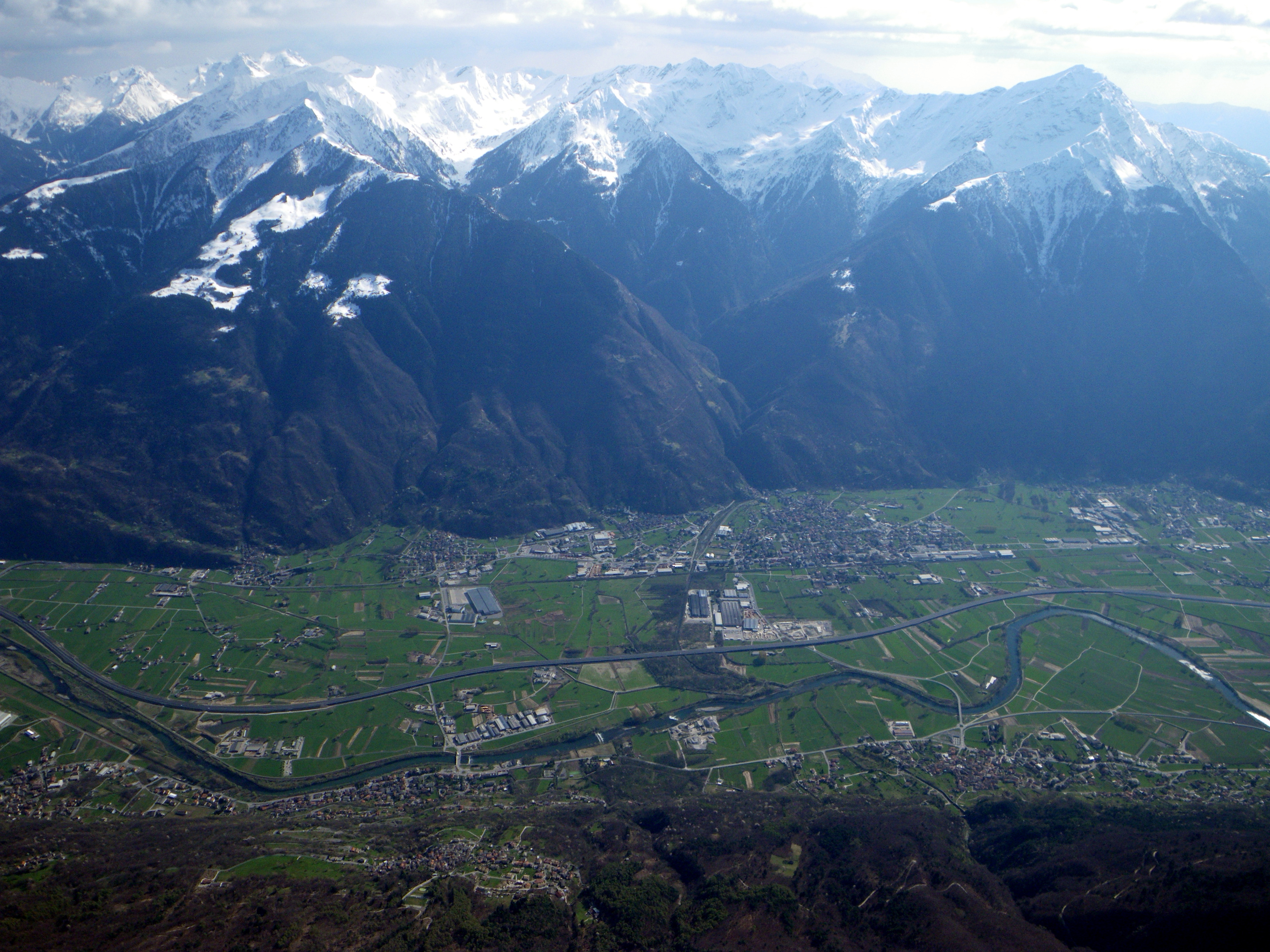
- View of Delebio from above

- Location within Italy Location within Lombardy
- Coordinates: 46°8′N 9°28′E
- Country: Italy
- Region: Lombardy
- Province: Sondrio (SO)

Government
  - Mayor: Marco Ioli

Area
  - Total: 22.44 km^{2} (8.66 sq mi)
- Elevation: 218 m (715 ft)

Population (30 June 2017)
  - Total: 3,252
  - Density: 144.9/km^{2} (375.3/sq mi)
- Demonym: Delebiesi
- Time zone: UTC+1 (CET)
  - Summer (DST): UTC+2 (CEST)
- Postal code: 23014
- Dialing code: 0342
- Website: Official website

Delebio (Lombard: Delébi) is a comune (municipality) in the Province of Sondrio in the Italian region of Lombardy, located about 80 kilometres (50 mi) northeast of Milan and about 30 kilometres (19 mi) west of Sondrio.

Delebio borders the following municipalities: Andalo Valtellino, Colico, Dubino, Pagnona, Piantedo, Premana, Rogolo.

It was the location of the Battle of Delebio in 1432.
