= Rogolo =

Rogolo Rùgul (Lombard)
- Comune
- Comune di Rogolo
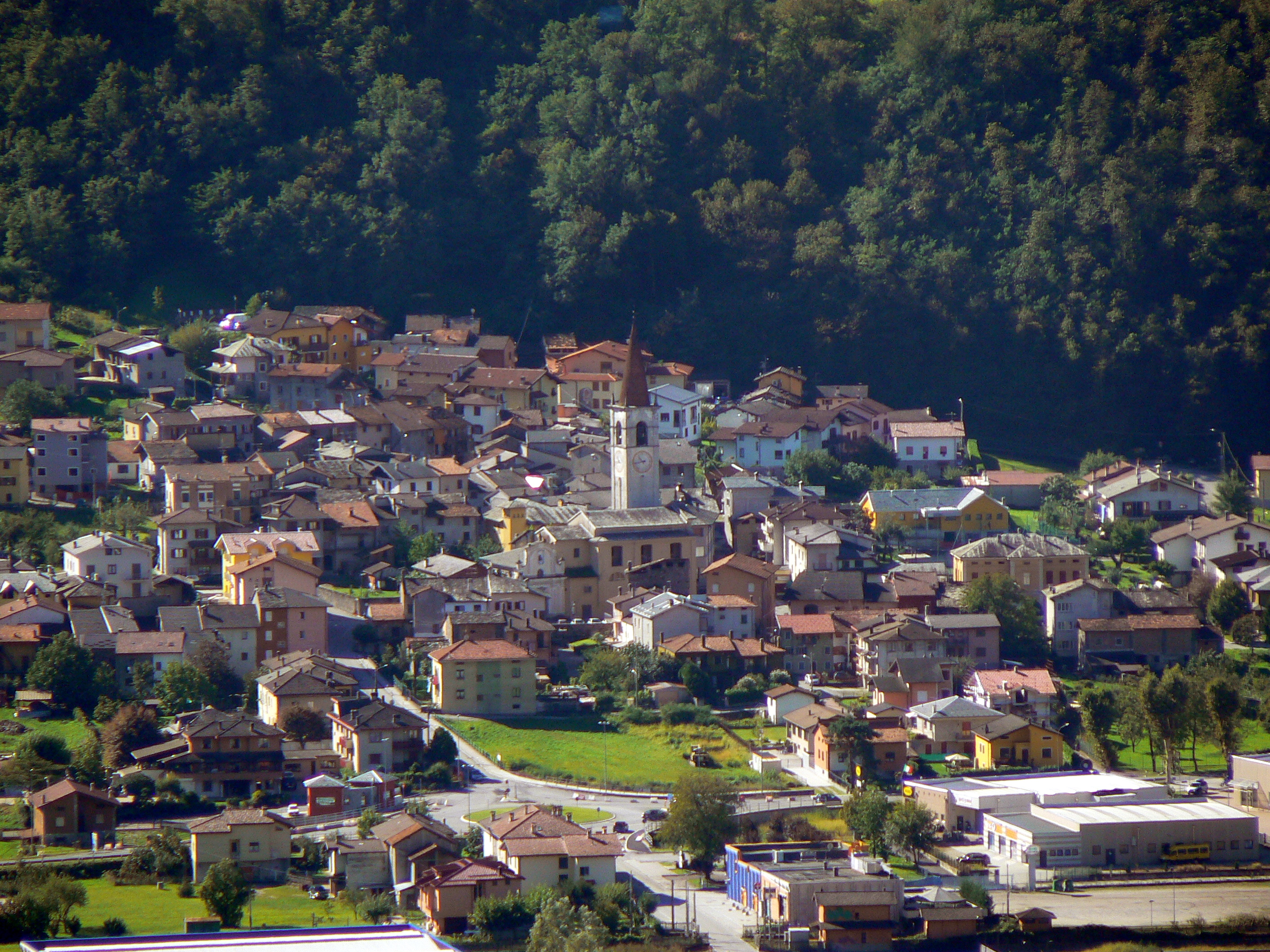
- Rogolo skyline

- Location within Italy Location within Lombardy
- Coordinates: 46°8′8″N 9°29′14″E
- Country: Italy
- Region: Lombardy
- Province: Province of Sondrio (SO)

Government
  - Mayor: Matteo Ferré

Area
  - Total: 13.0 km^{2} (5.0 sq mi)

Population (2011)
  - Total: 564
  - Density: 43.4/km^{2} (112/sq mi)
- Time zone: UTC+1 (CET)
  - Summer (DST): UTC+2 (CEST)
- Postal code: 23010
- Dialing code: 0342
- Website: Official website

Rogolo (Lombard: Rùgul) is a comune (municipality) in the Province of Sondrio in the Italian region of Lombardy, located about 80 kilometres (50 mi) northeast of Milan and about 30 kilometres (19 mi) west of Sondrio. As of 31 December 2004, it had a population of 568 and an area of 13.0 square kilometres (5.0 mi^{2}). Rogolo borders the following municipalities: Andalo Valtellino, Cosio Valtellino, Delebio, Mantello, Pedesina, Premana, Rasura.

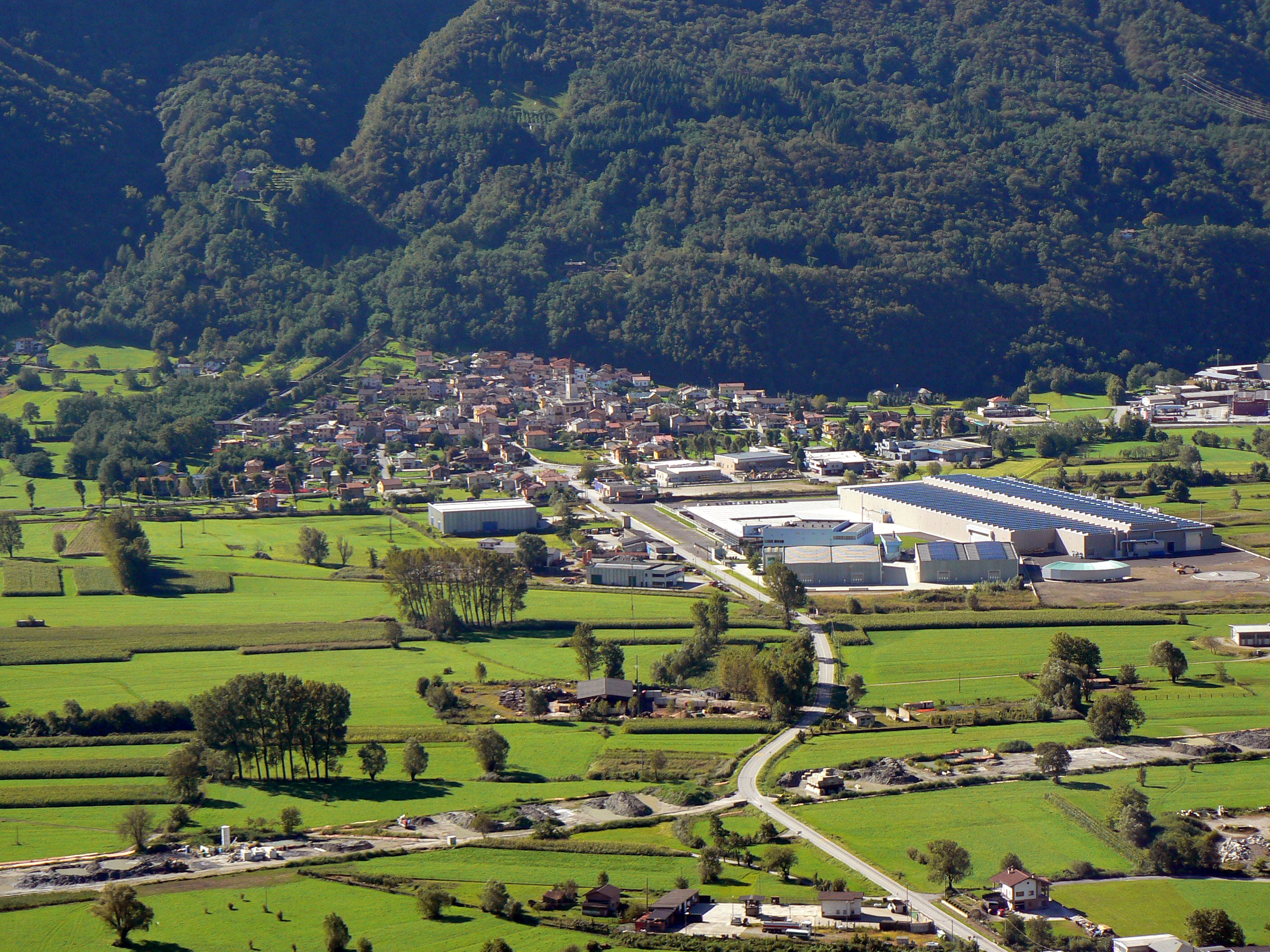
Rogolo 2010

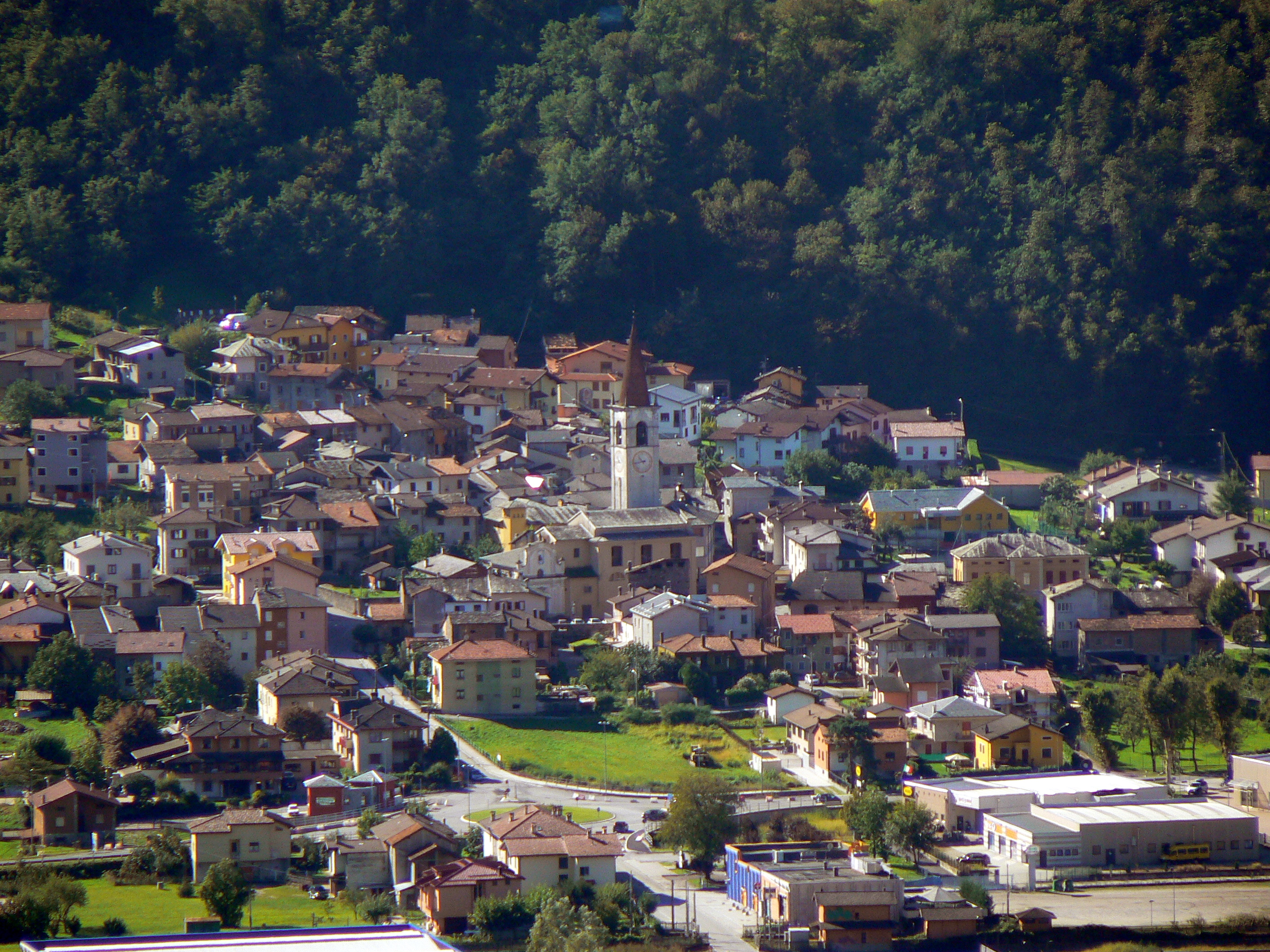
Abitato di Rogolo 2010

== Demographic evolution ==
Historical population

Year	Pop.	±%
1861	404	—
1871	403	−0.2%
1881	444	+10.2%
1901	435	−2.0%
1911	452	+3.9%

Year	Pop.	±%
1921	484	+7.1%
1931	396	−18.2%
1936	408	+3.0%
1951	437	+7.1%
1961	441	+0.9%

Year	Pop.	±%
1971	452	+2.5%
1981	461	+2.0%
1991	475	+3.0%
2001	501	+5.5%
2011	564	+12.6%

Source: Data from ISTAT

== Administration ==
Period		Primo cittadino	Carica	Party
1990	1995	Bruno Maiorana	Sindaco	Lista Alleanza Democratica
1995	1999	Franco Ferré	Sindaco	Lista Alleanza Democratica
1999	2004	Matteo Dell'Oca	Sindaco	Lista Alleanza Democratica
2004	2009	Matteo Dell'Oca	Sindaco	Lista Alleanza Democratica
2009	in carica	Matteo Ferré	Sindaco	Lista Alleanza Democratica
