= Province of Sondrio =

Province of Italy, located in the Lombardy region

Coordinates: 46°21′37″N 9°56′38″E

Province of Sondrio Provincia di Sondrio (Italian)
- Province
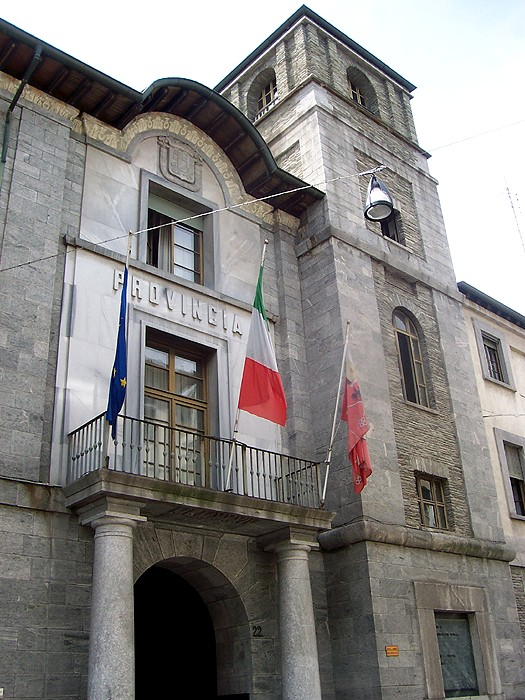
- Palazzo del Governo, the seat of the province

- Flag Coat of arms

- Location of the province of Sondrio in Italy
- Country: Italy
- Region: Lombardy
- Capital(s): Sondrio
- Municipalities: 77

Government
  - President: Davide Menegola

Area
  - Total: 3,195.76 km^{2} (1,233.89 sq mi)

Population (2026)
  - Total: 179,268
  - Density: 56.0956/km^{2} (145.287/sq mi)

GDP
  - Total: €5.149 billion (2015)
  - Per capita: €28,307 (2015)
- Time zone: UTC+1 (CET)
  - Summer (DST): UTC+2 (CEST)
- Telephone prefix: 0342, 0343
- Vehicle registration: SO
- ISTAT: 014

The province of Sondrio (Italian: provincia di Sondrio), also known as Valtellina (the major valley of the province) is a province in the region of Lombardy in Italy. Its provincial capital is the city of Sondrio.

It has a population of 179,268 in an area of 3,195.76 square kilometres (1,233.89 sq mi) across its 77 municipalities.

== History ==
Map with the grey area of Valchiavenna, Tre Pievi, Valtellina and Bormio ruled by the Three Leagues from 1512 to 1797

Historical regions of the province of Sondrio

The province was established in 1815, within the Kingdom of Lombardy–Venetia, combining the valleys of Valtellina, Valchiavenna and Bormio.

Before the Roman conquest, the territory was inhabited by Celts (Lepontii) and Rhaetians (Camunni). The Romans included this area in their Cisalpine Gaul province.

After the fall of the Western Roman Empire, it came under the control of the Lombards and was first ruled by feudal lords from the local area. During the Middle Ages it belonged to the Kingdom of Italy. In the 14th century it fell under the rule of the Duchy of Milan due to the House of Visconti and House of Sforza. Sondrio and Valtellina were strategically important in the politics of Europe, especially in the sixteenth and 17th century religious wars, due to their connections to Europe by Sondrio's Spluga Pass and valleys. Upon the collapse of the Duchy of Milan, rule over Sondrio was exercised by the Swiss Canton of Graubünden. In the Valtellina War, Valtellina was invaded in 1622 by the Spanish Governor of Milan as the valleys had been used to transport troops around Europe; the Spanish efforts were assisted by a 1620 religious revolt in Valtellina against the Swiss.

The Peace of Westphalia (1648) secured peace in the region and granted the region to the Canton of Graubünden. In 1797, the Republic of Valtellina was formed but was quickly conquered by the French to become a component of the Cisalpine Republic client state. The Congress of Vienna (1815) Sondrio and Valtellina as a province of the Austrian Kingdom of Lombardy–Venetia. As most of Lombardy region was absorbed into Kingdom of Sardinia in 1860, Sondrio and Valtellina were also absorbed into Sardinia.

== Geography ==
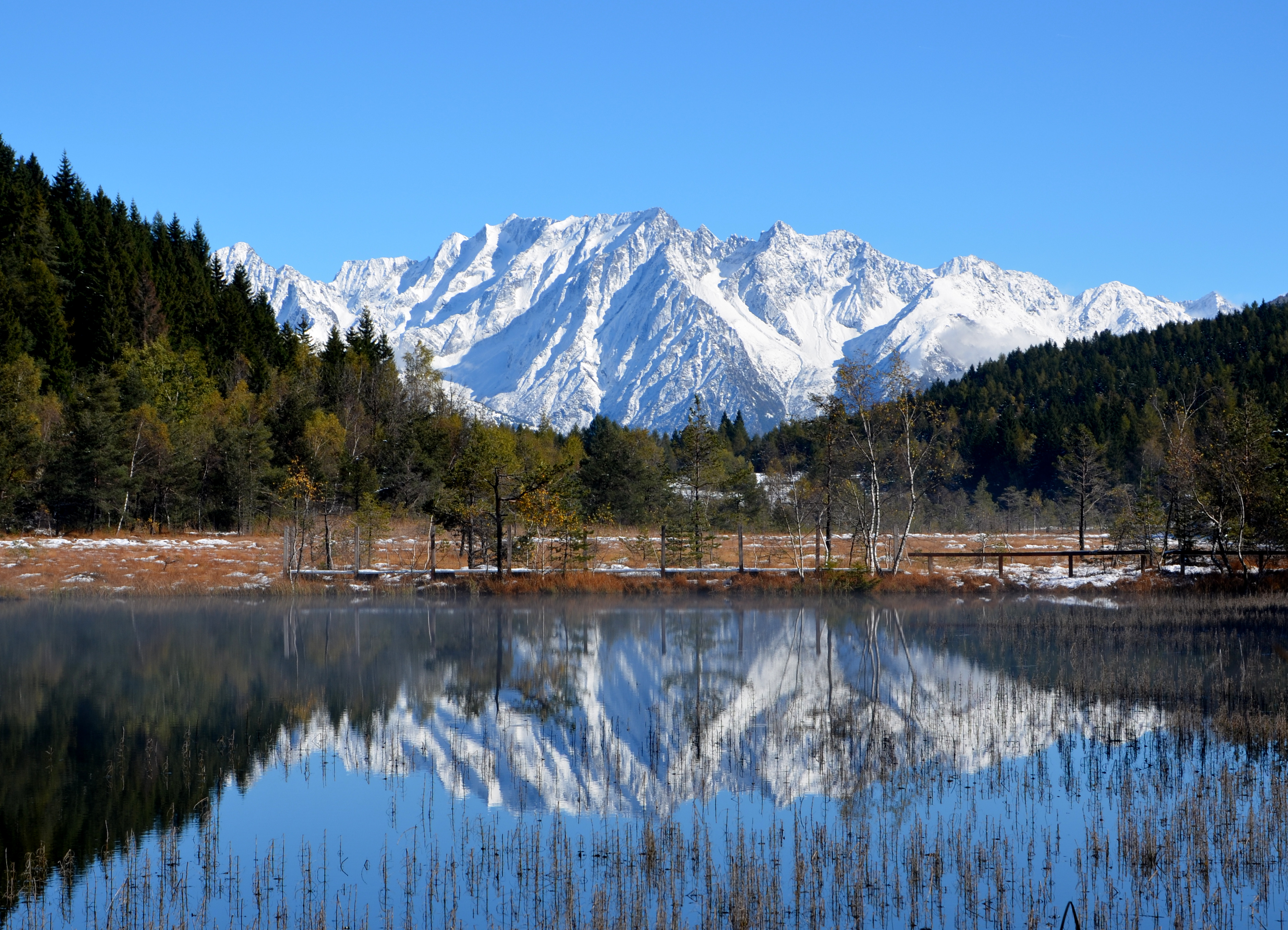
Di Pian di Gembro natural reserve

The province of Sondrio is a mostly mountainous, sparsely populated area in the north of Lombardy. It borders on the Swiss Canton of Graubünden to the north, the provinces of Como and Lecco to the west, the province of Bergamo to the south and the provinces of Brescia, Trento and Bolzano to the east. The Rhaetian Alps are the highest mountains in Lombardy. The valleys mostly run from north to south, the main ones being the Valtellina and Valchiavenna. One of the main comuni (municipalities) is Livigno (1,800 m above sea level), which is a tourist centre in the summer and a ski resort in the winter. There are 78 comuni in the province, and Sondrio is the biggest town and the administrative centre. The Stelvio National Park is located in the north-eastern end of the province.

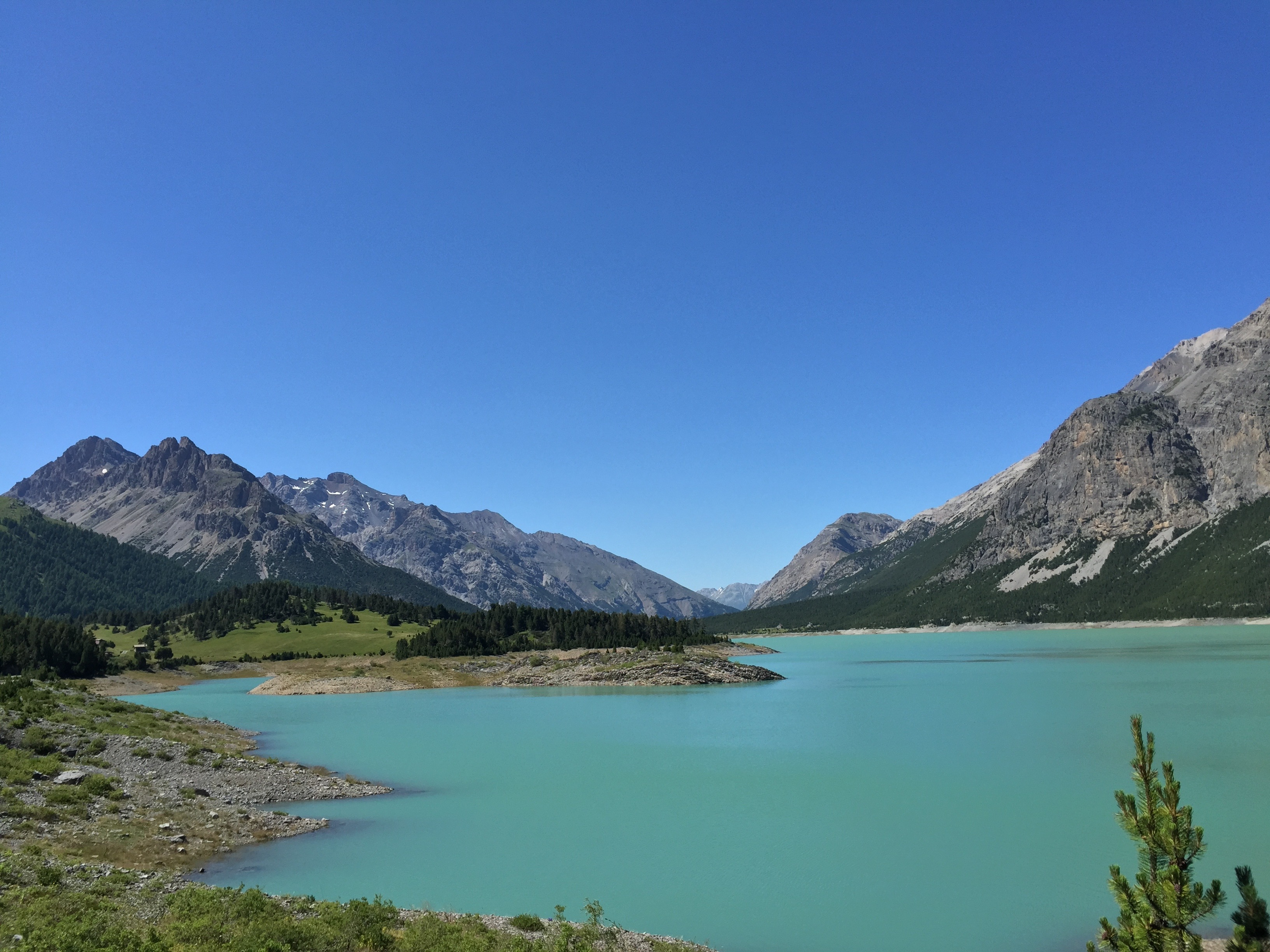
Bacino di San Giacomo

The economy is based on construction, logging, quarrying, tourism and light industry. Workers from Switzerland commute to work in Sondrio, and other workers cross the border from Italy to join the Swiss workforce. Throughout the province grapes have traditionally been grown, each district having its own local variety and producing its own local wine. It has been necessary for farmers to engineer terraces on the steep slopes, building dry stone retaining walls and moving earth to make the best use of terrain that is unsuitable for general agricultural purposes. The traditions of viticulture are embedded in the culture of the countryside.

== Municipalities ==
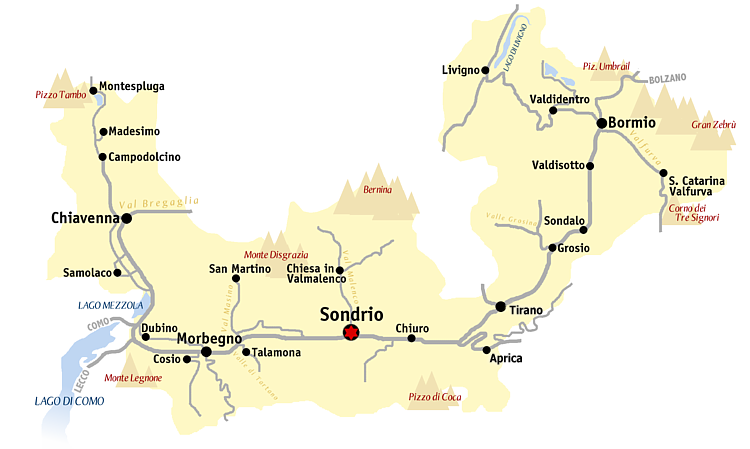
Towns, roads and mountains of the province

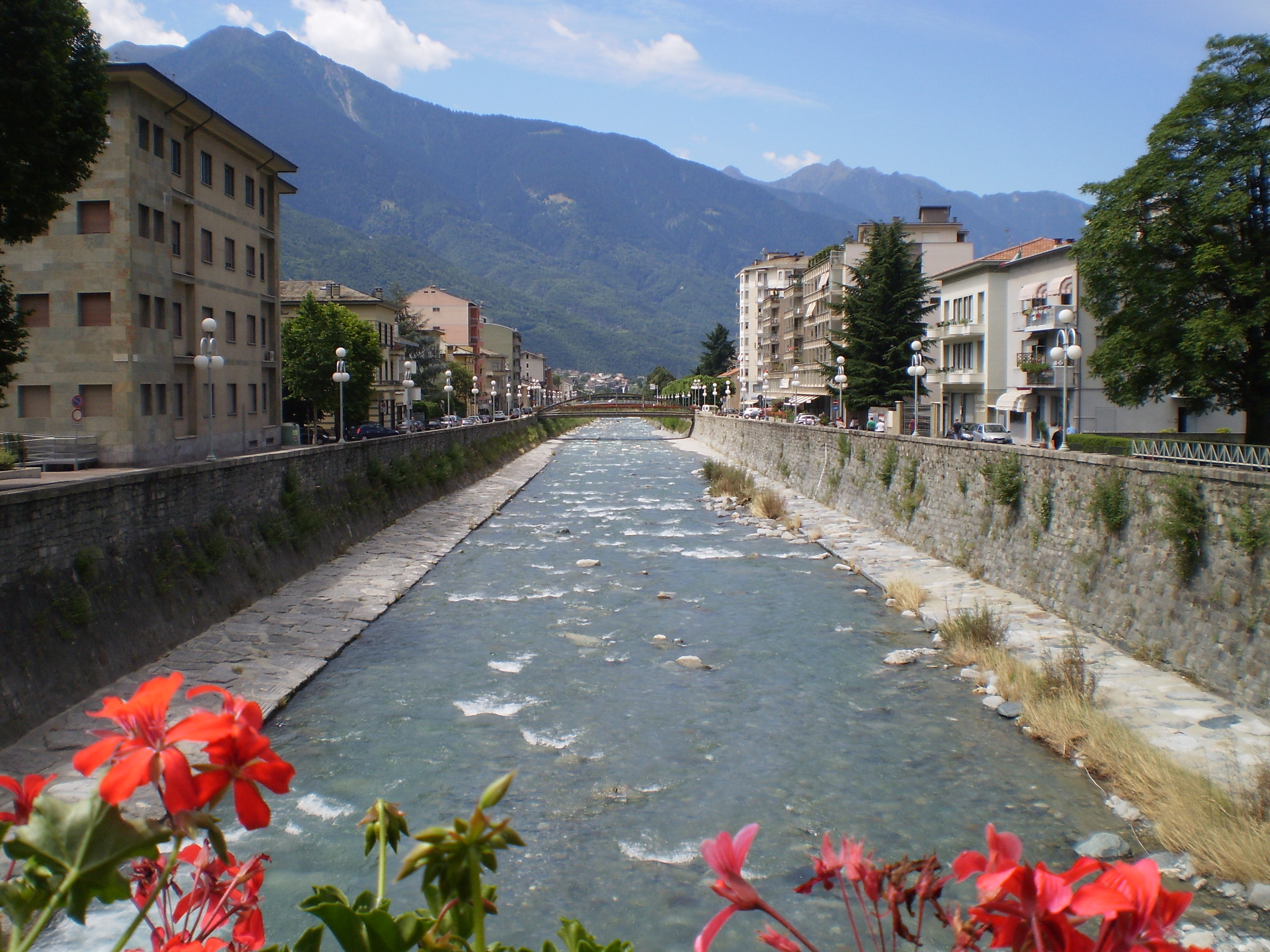
Sondrio

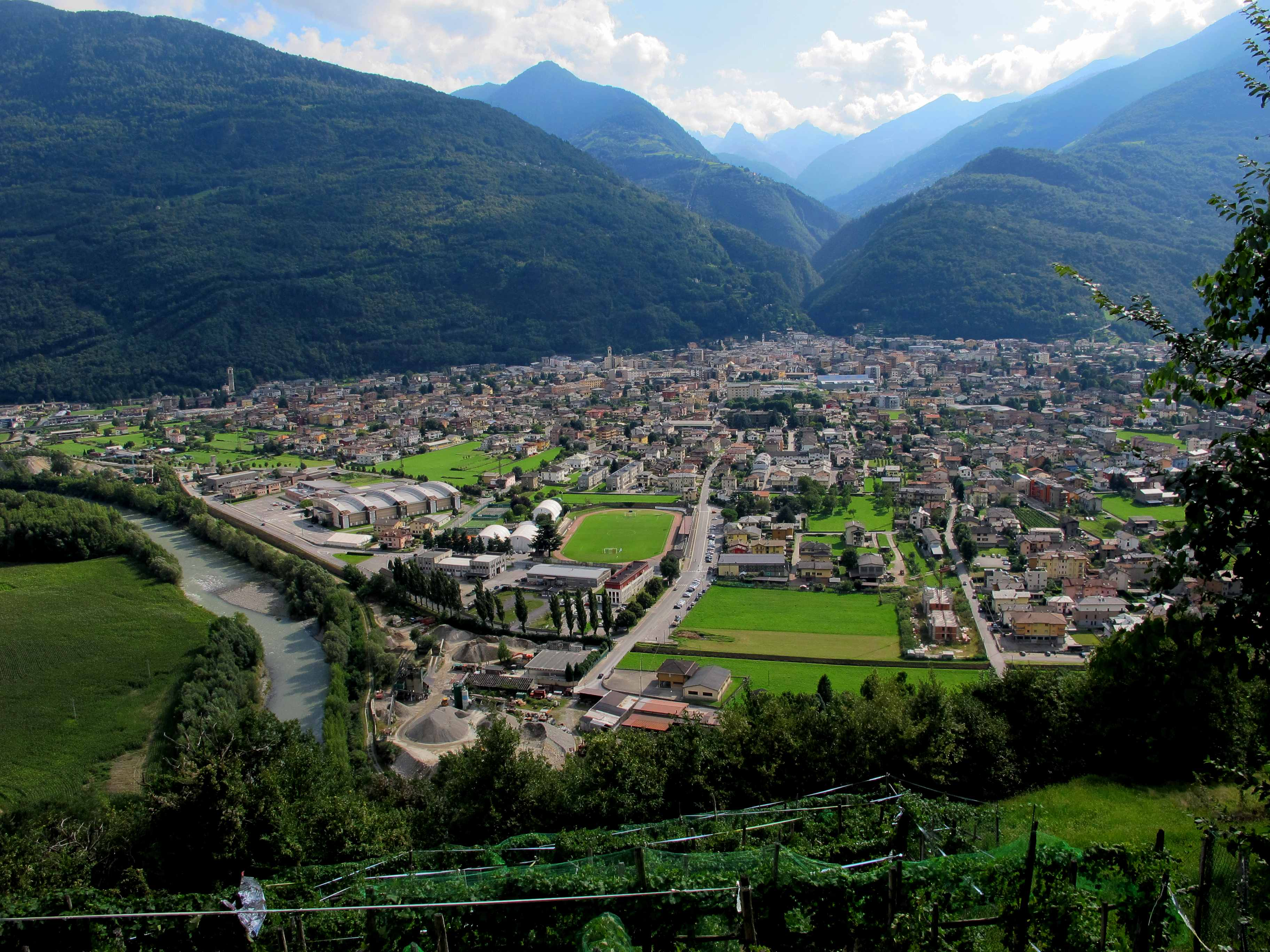
Morbegno

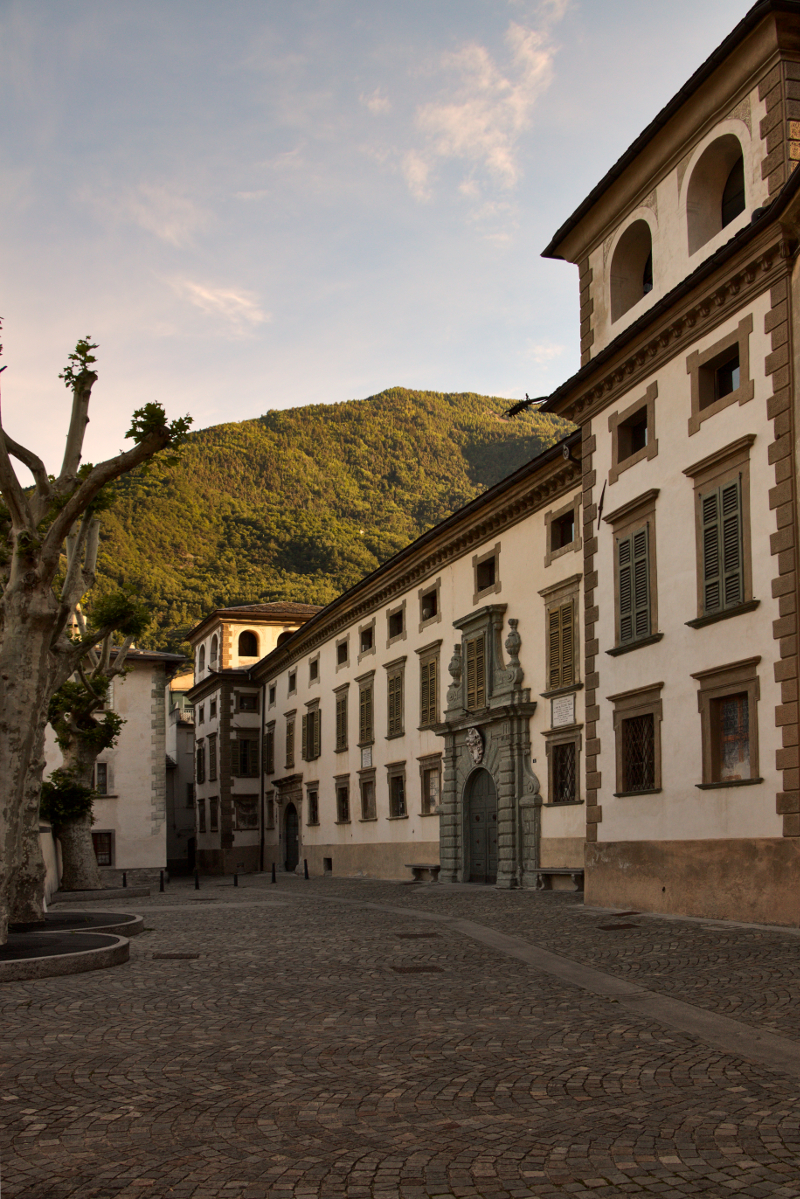
Tirano

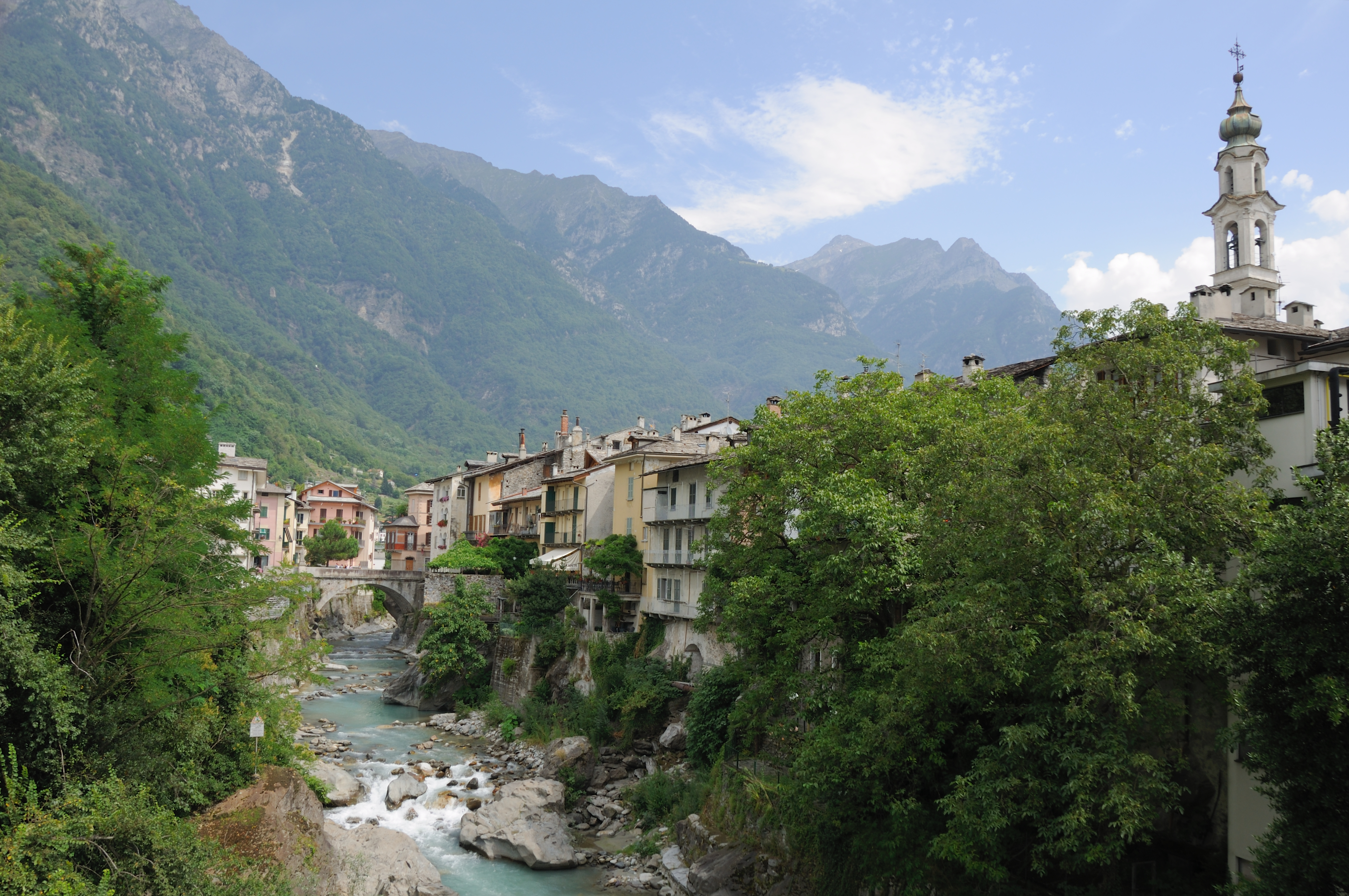
Chiavenna

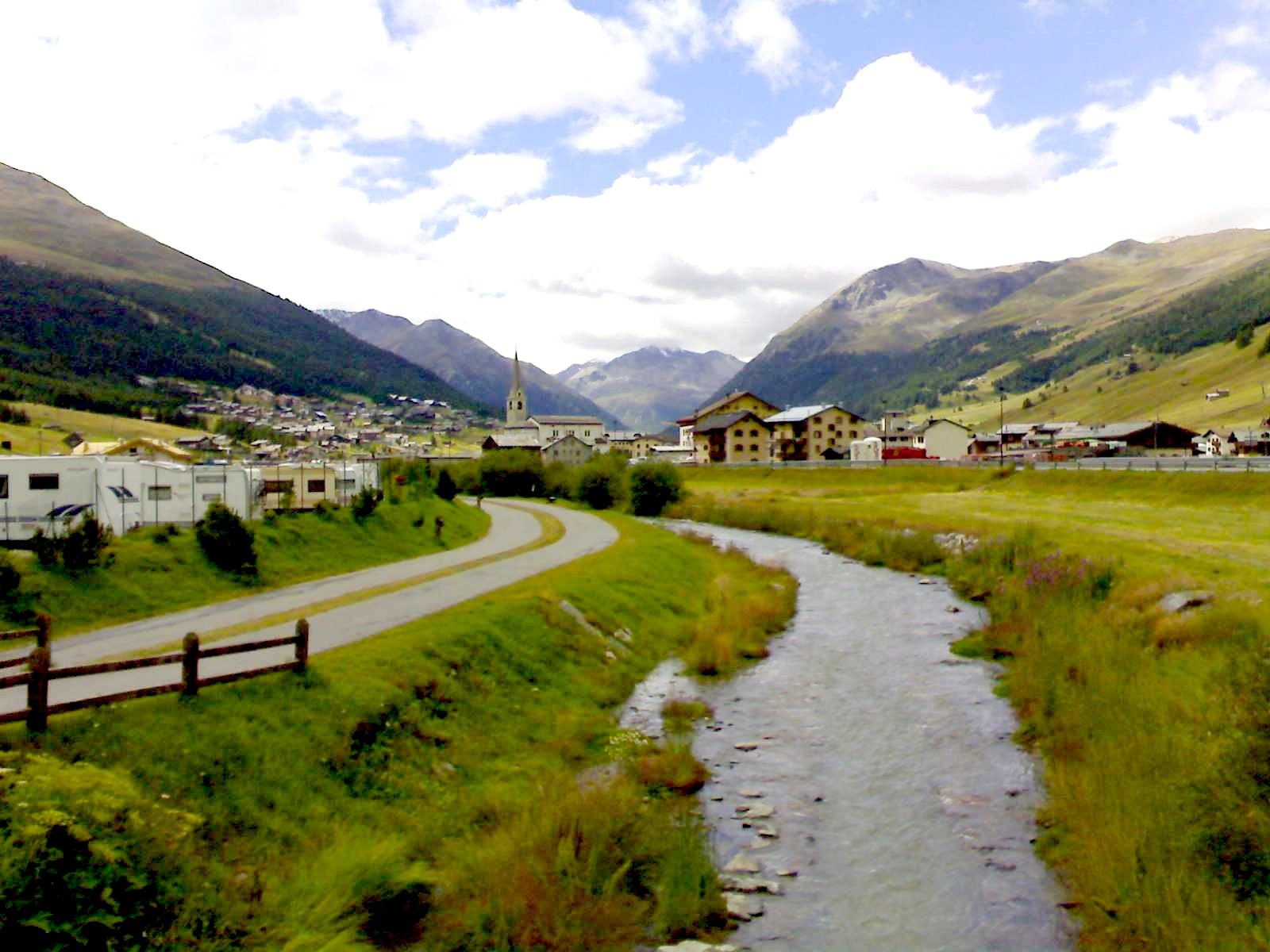
Livigno

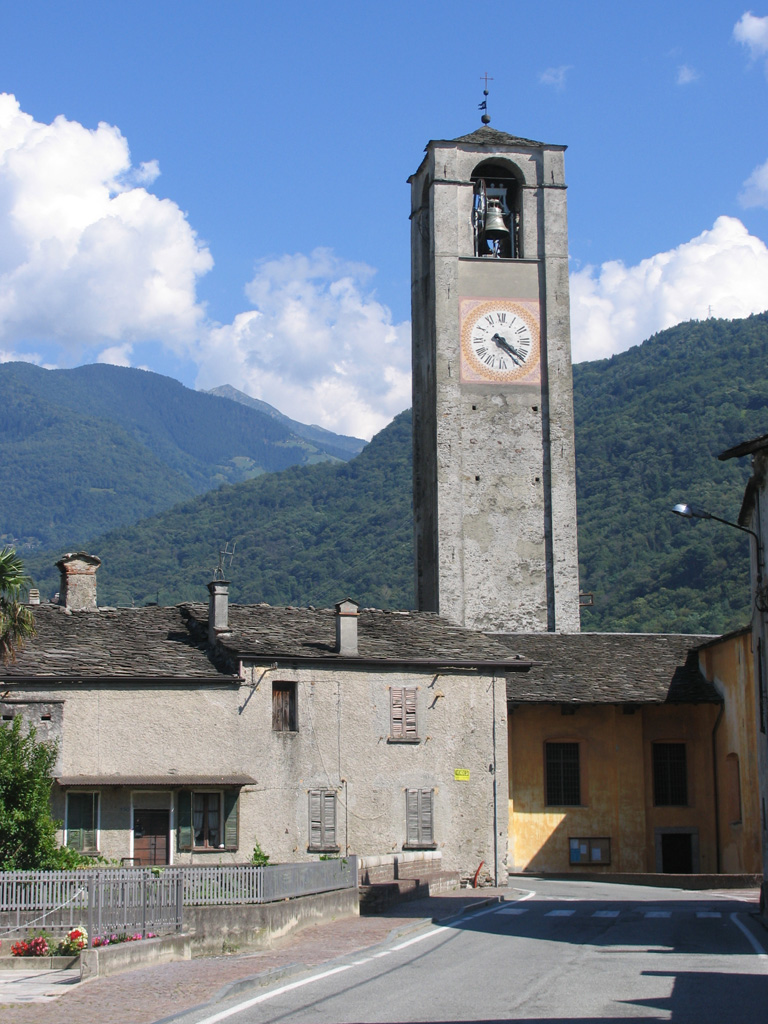
Cosio Valtellino

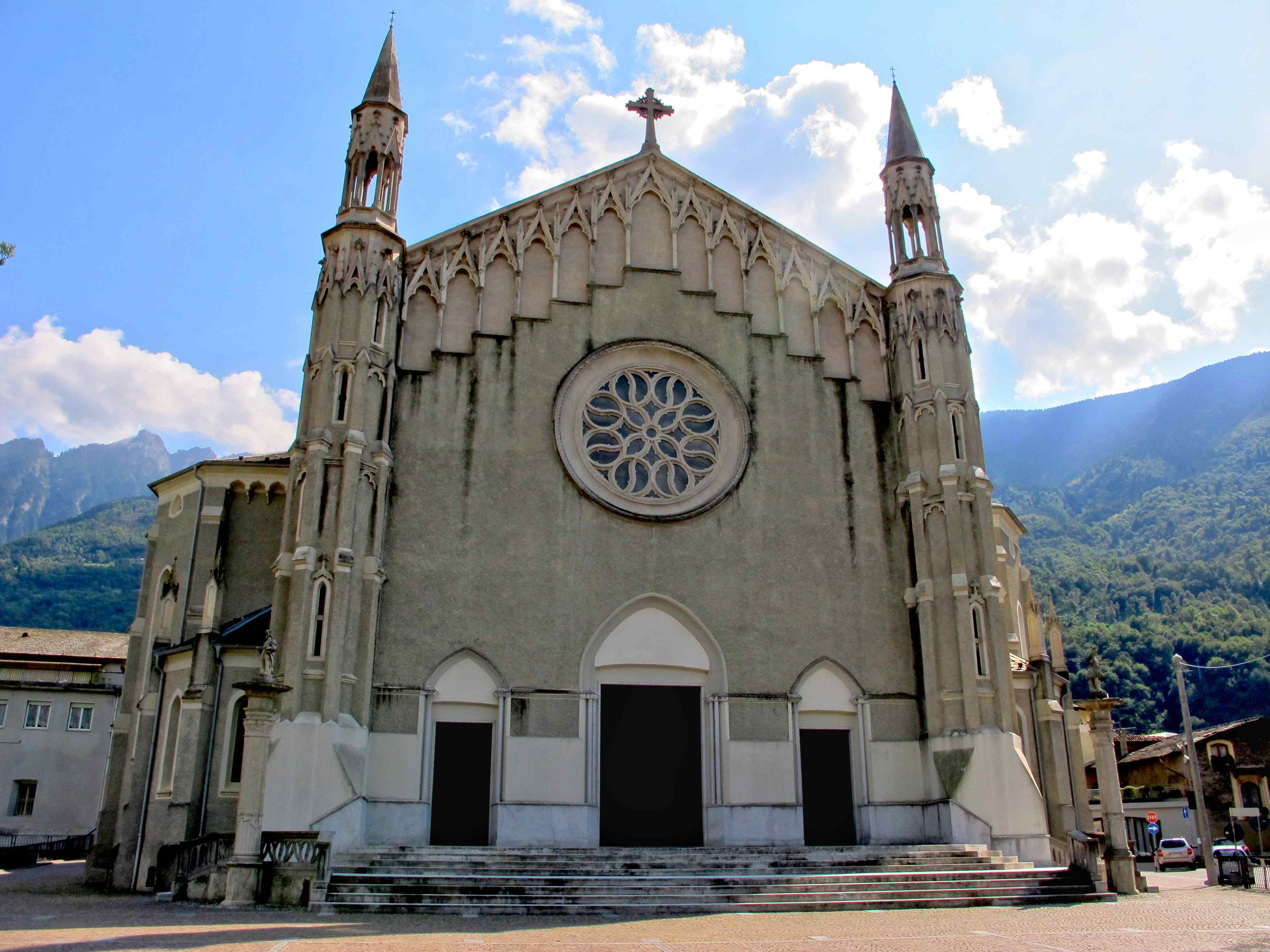
Talamona

The province has 77 municipalities:

- Albaredo per San Marco
- Albosaggia
- Andalo Valtellino
- Aprica
- Ardenno
- Bema
- Berbenno di Valtellina
- Bianzone
- Bormio
- Buglio in Monte
- Caiolo
- Campodolcino
- Caspoggio
- Castello dell'Acqua
- Castione Andevenno
- Cedrasco
- Cercino
- Chiavenna
- Chiesa in Valmalenco
- Chiuro
- Cino
- Civo
- Colorina
- Cosio Valtellino
- Dazio
- Delebio
- Dubino
- Faedo Valtellino
- Forcola
- Fusine
- Gerola Alta
- Gordona
- Grosio
- Grosotto
- Lanzada
- Livigno
- Lovero
- Madesimo
- Mantello
- Mazzo di Valtellina
- Mello
- Mese
- Montagna in Valtellina
- Morbegno
- Novate Mezzola
- Pedesina
- Piantedo
- Piateda
- Piuro
- Poggiridenti
- Ponte in Valtellina
- Postalesio
- Prata Camportaccio
- Rasura
- Rogolo
- Samolaco
- San Giacomo Filippo
- Sernio
- Sondalo
- Sondrio
- Spriana
- Talamona
- Tartano
- Teglio
- Tirano
- Torre di Santa Maria
- Tovo di Sant'Agata
- Traona
- Tresivio
- Val Masino
- Valdidentro
- Valdisotto
- Valfurva
- Verceia
- Vervio
- Villa di Chiavenna
- Villa di Tirano

== Demographics ==
As of 2026, the population is 179,268, of which 49.6% are male, and 50.4% are female. Minors make up 14.5% of the population, and seniors make up 26.2%.

Historical population

Year	Pop.	±%
1861	110,028	—
1871	117,390	+6.7%
1881	124,914	+6.4%
1901	130,966	+4.8%
1911	140,642	+7.4%
1921	142,550	+1.4%
1931	140,218	−1.6%
1936	142,919	+1.9%

Year	Pop.	±%
1951	153,493	+7.4%
1961	161,450	+5.2%
1971	169,149	+4.8%
1981	174,009	+2.9%
1991	175,496	+0.9%
2001	176,856	+0.8%
2011	180,814	+2.2%
2021	178,784	−1.1%

Source: ISTAT

=== Immigration ===
As of 2025, immigrants make up 9.7% of the population. The 5 largest foreign countries of birth are Morocco, Switzerland, Romania, Ukraine, and Moldova.

== See also ==
- Bacino di San Giacomo
