= Dubino =

Dubino Dübin (Lombard)
- Comune
- Comune di Dubino
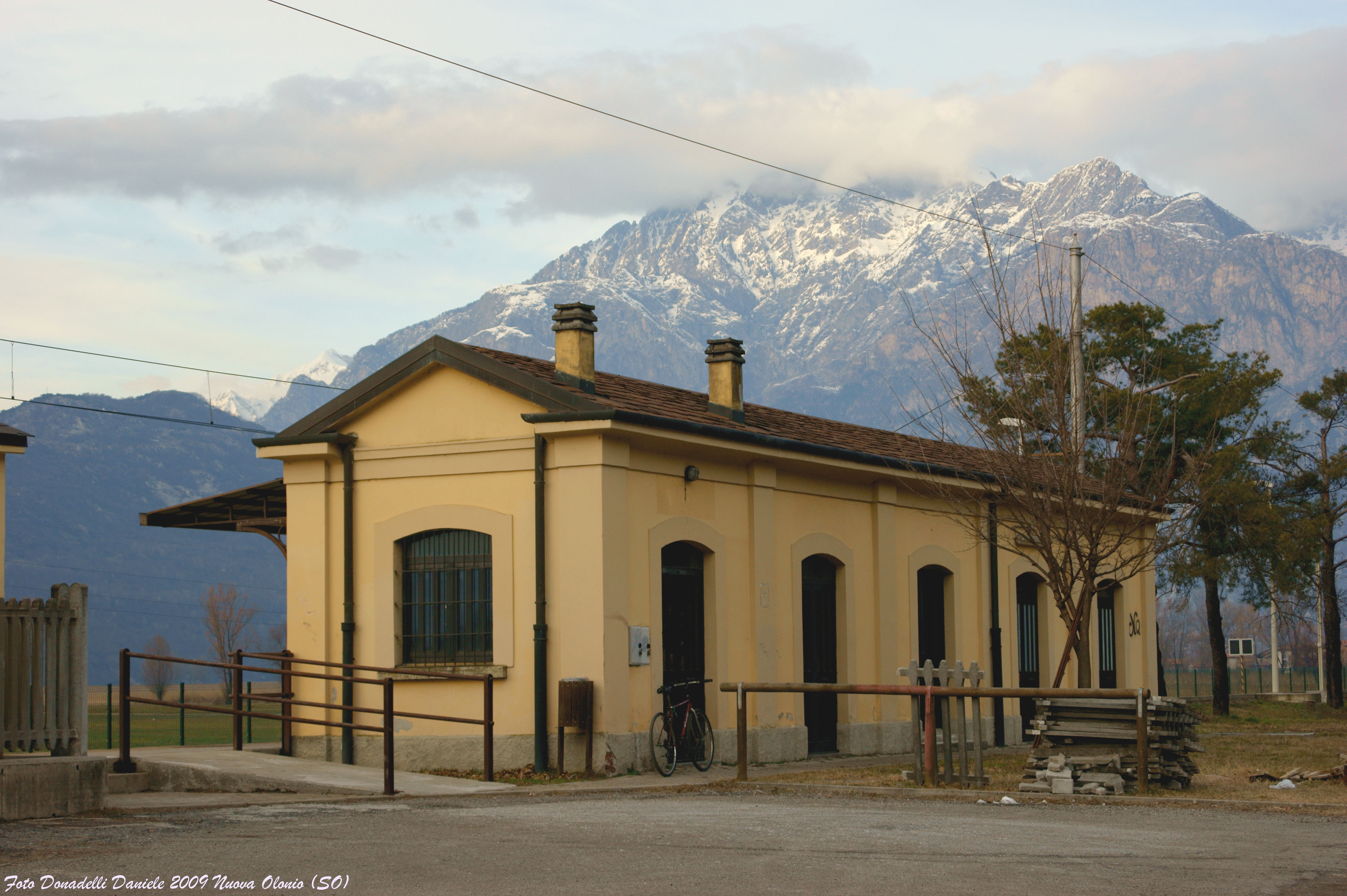
- Dubino railway halt

- Location within Italy Location within Lombardy
- Coordinates: 46°9′N 9°27′E
- Country: Italy
- Region: Lombardy
- Province: Province of Sondrio (SO)

Area
  - Total: 13.1 km^{2} (5.1 sq mi)

Population (Dec. 2004)
  - Total: 3,270
  - Density: 250/km^{2} (647/sq mi)
- Demonym: Dubinesi
- Time zone: UTC+1 (CET)
  - Summer (DST): UTC+2 (CEST)
- Postal code: 23015
- Dialing code: 0342
- Patron saint: Saint Peter
- Saint day: 29th of June

Dubino (Lombard: Dübin) is a comune (municipality) in the Province of Sondrio in the Italian region of Lombardy, located about 80 kilometres (50 mi) northeast of Milan and about 30 kilometres (19 mi) west of Sondrio. As of 31 December 2004, it had a population of 3,270 and an area of 13.1 square kilometres (5.1 mi^{2}).

Dubino borders the following municipalities: Andalo Valtellino, Cino, Delebio, Gera Lario, Mantello, Novate Mezzola, Piantedo, Sorico, Verceia.

== Demographic evolution ==
Historical population

Year	Pop.	±%
1861	599	—
1871	648	+8.2%
1881	813	+25.5%
1901	989	+21.6%
1911	1,209	+22.2%

Year	Pop.	±%
1921	1,128	−6.7%
1931	1,423	+26.2%
1936	1,520	+6.8%
1951	1,694	+11.4%
1961	2,076	+22.6%

Year	Pop.	±%
1971	2,492	+20.0%
1981	2,841	+14.0%
1991	3,000	+5.6%
2001	3,160	+5.3%

Source: Data from ISTAT
