= Villa di Tirano =

- Comune
- Comune di Villa di Tirano
- Location within Italy Location within Lombardy
- Coordinates: 46°12′N 10°8′E
- Country: Italy
- Region: Lombardy
- Province: Province of Sondrio (SO)
- Frazioni: Motta, Stazzona

Area
  - Total: 24.6 km^{2} (9.5 sq mi)
- Elevation: 406 m (1,332 ft)

Population (Dec. 2004)
  - Total: 2,997
  - Density: 122/km^{2} (316/sq mi)
- Demonym: Villaschi
- Time zone: UTC+1 (CET)
  - Summer (DST): UTC+2 (CEST)
- Postal code: 23030
- Dialing code: 0342

Villa di Tirano is a comune (municipality) in the Province of Sondrio in the Italian region Lombardy, located about 110 kilometres (68 mi) northeast of Milan and about 20 kilometres (12 mi) east of Sondrio, on the border with Switzerland. As of 31 December 2004, it had a population of 2,997 and an area of 24.6 square kilometres (9.5 mi^{2}).

The municipality of Villa di Tirano contains the frazioni (subdivisions, mainly villages and hamlets) Motta and Stazzona.

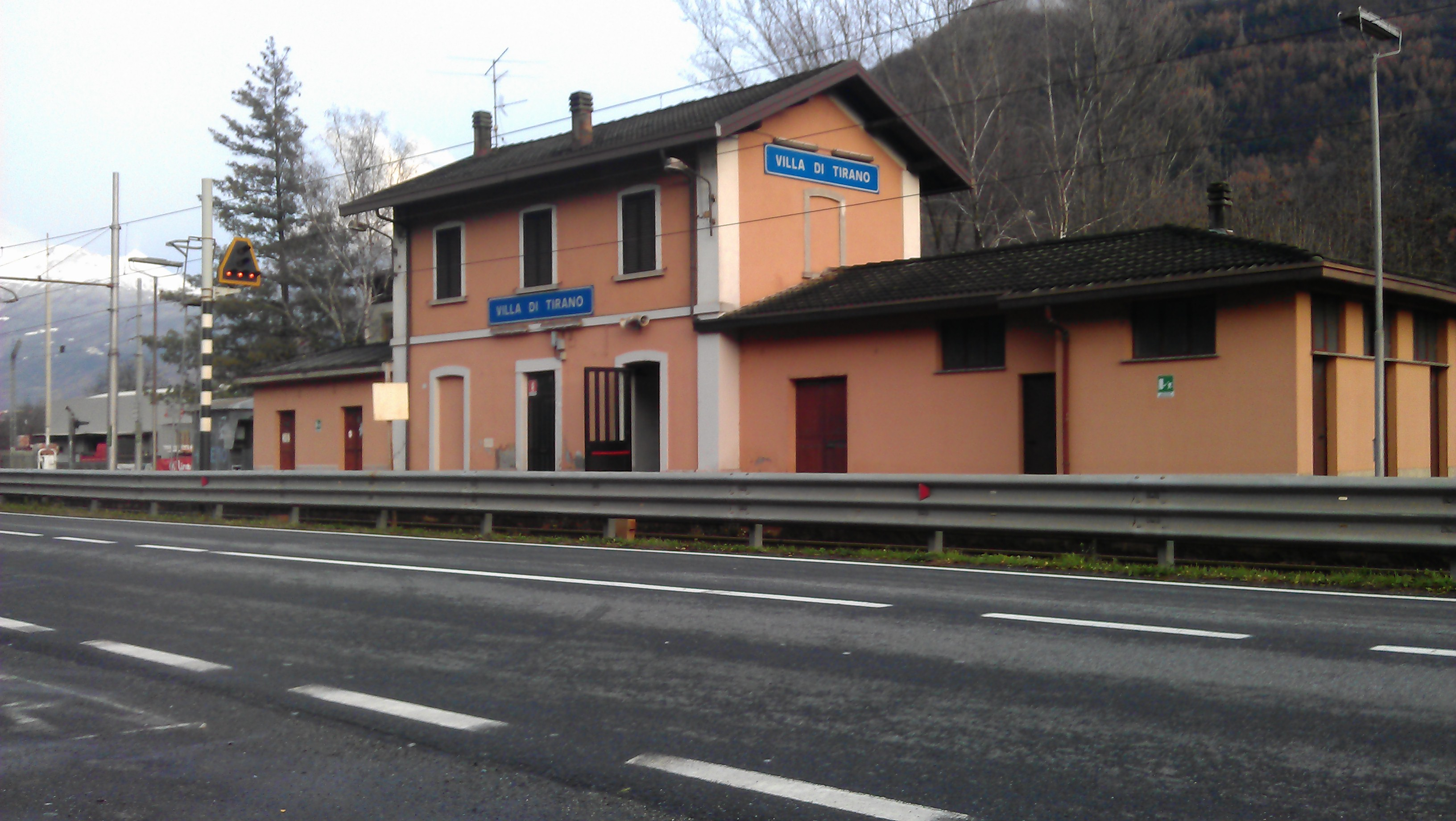
the railway station

Villa di Tirano borders the following municipalities: Aprica, Bianzone, Brusio (Switzerland), Corteno Golgi, Teglio, Tirano.

== Demographic evolution ==
Historical population

Year	Pop.	±%
1861	3,535	—
1871	3,436	−2.8%
1881	3,501	+1.9%
1901	3,623	+3.5%
1911	3,728	+2.9%

Year	Pop.	±%
1921	3,434	−7.9%
1931	3,240	−5.6%
1936	3,431	+5.9%
1951	3,296	−3.9%
1961	3,159	−4.2%

Year	Pop.	±%
1971	3,016	−4.5%
1981	2,935	−2.7%
1991	2,928	−0.2%
2001	2,968	+1.4%

Source: Data from ISTAT
