= Cercino =

Cercino Scercin (Lombard)
- Comune
- Comune di Cercino
- Location within Italy Location within Lombardy
- Coordinates: 46°9′N 9°30′E
- Country: Italy
- Region: Lombardy
- Province: Province of Sondrio (SO)

Government
  - Mayor: Michela Parravicini

Area
  - Total: 6.2 km^{2} (2.4 sq mi)

Population (Nov. 2014)
  - Total: 786
  - Density: 130/km^{2} (330/sq mi)
- Time zone: UTC+1 (CET)
  - Summer (DST): UTC+2 (CEST)
- Postal code: 23016
- Dialing code: 0342

Cercino (Lombard: Scercin) is a comune (municipality) in the Province of Sondrio in the Italian region of Lombardy, located about 80 kilometres (50 mi) northeast of Milan and about 30 kilometres (19 mi) west of Sondrio. As of 30 November 2014, it had a population of 786 and an area of 6.2 square kilometres (2.4 mi^{2}).

Cercino borders the following municipalities: Cino, Cosio Valtellino, Mantello, Novate Mezzola, Traona.

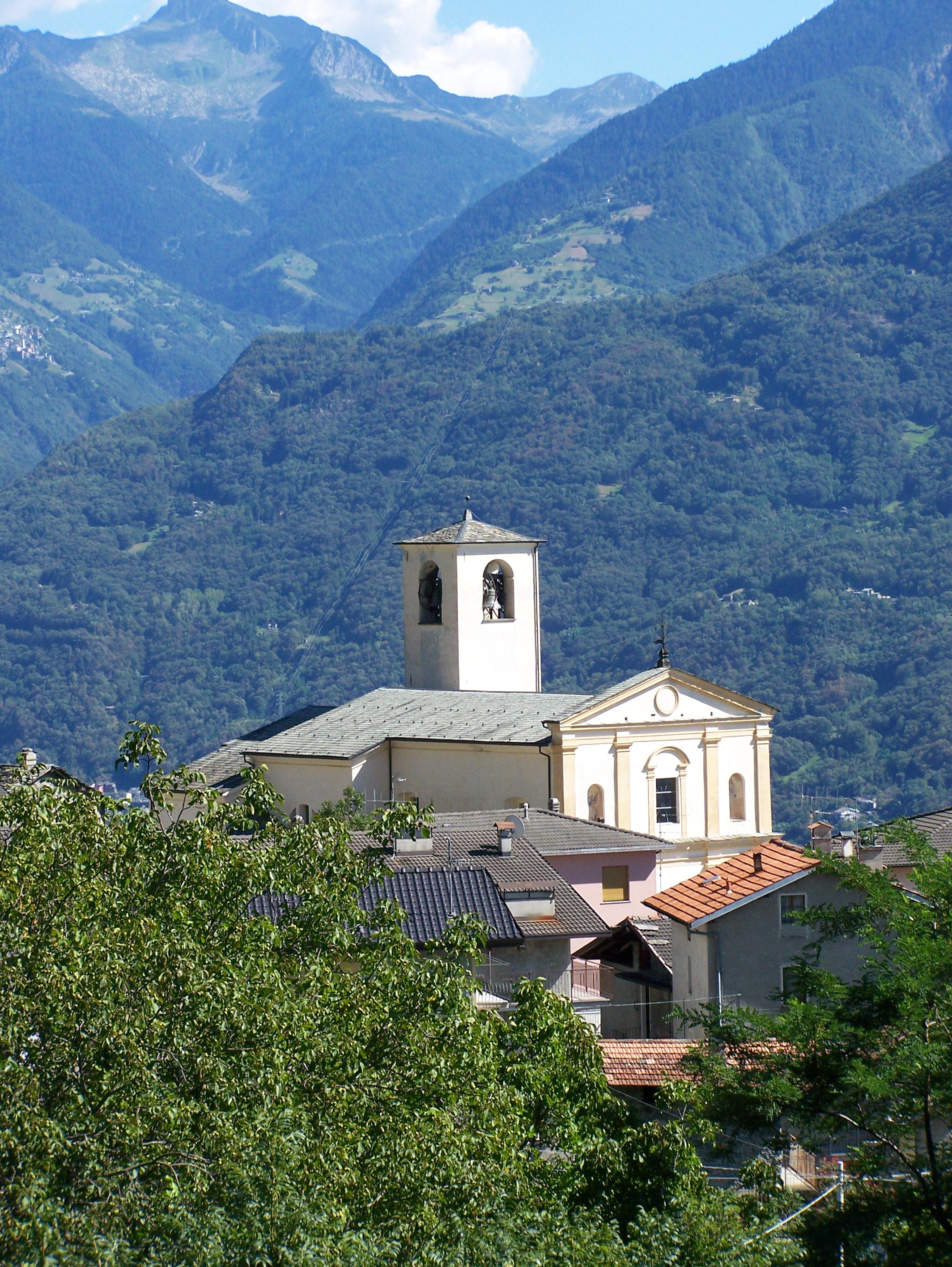
the town

== Demographic evolution ==
Historical population

Year	Pop.	±%
1861	614	—
1871	628	+2.3%
1881	675	+7.5%
1901	742	+9.9%
1911	701	−5.5%

Year	Pop.	±%
1921	854	+21.8%
1931	763	−10.7%
1936	774	+1.4%
1951	754	−2.6%
1961	767	+1.7%

Year	Pop.	±%
1971	583	−24.0%
1981	521	−10.6%
1991	647	+24.2%
2001	689	+6.5%

Source: Data from ISTAT
