= Rasura =

Rasura Resüra (Lombard)
- Comune
- Comune di Rasura
- Location within Italy Location within Lombardy
- Coordinates: 46°6′N 9°33′E
- Country: Italy
- Region: Lombardy
- Province: Province of Sondrio (SO)

Area
  - Total: 5.5 km^{2} (2.1 sq mi)

Population (Dec. 2004)
  - Total: 297
  - Density: 54/km^{2} (140/sq mi)
- Time zone: UTC+1 (CET)
  - Summer (DST): UTC+2 (CEST)
- Postal code: 23010
- Dialing code: 0342

Rasura (Lombard: Resüra) is a comune (municipality) in the Province of Sondrio in the Italian region of Lombardy, located about 80 kilometres (50 mi) northeast of Milan and about 25 kilometres (16 mi) southwest of Sondrio. As of 31 December 2004, it had a population of 297 and an area of 5.5 square kilometres (2.1 mi^{2}).

Rasura borders the following municipalities: Bema, Cosio Valtellino, Pedesina, Rogolo.

== Demographic evolution ==
Historical population

Year	Pop.	±%
1861	298	—
1871	293	−1.7%
1881	326	+11.3%
1901	404	+23.9%
1911	414	+2.5%

Year	Pop.	±%
1921	404	−2.4%
1931	342	−15.3%
1936	344	+0.6%
1951	448	+30.2%
1961	425	−5.1%

Year	Pop.	±%
1971	361	−15.1%
1981	363	+0.6%
1991	329	−9.4%
2001	306	−7.0%

Source: Data from ISTAT
