= Caspoggio =

- Comune
- Comune di Caspoggio
- Coat of arms

- Location within Italy Location within Lombardy
- Coordinates: 46°16′N 9°52′E
- Country: Italy
- Region: Lombardy
- Province: Sondrio (SO)

Government
  - Mayor: Danilo Bruseghini

Area
  - Total: 6.8 km^{2} (2.6 sq mi)
- Elevation: 1,098 m (3,602 ft)

Population (2008)
  - Total: 1,585
  - Density: 230/km^{2} (600/sq mi)
- Time zone: UTC+1 (CET)
  - Summer (DST): UTC+2 (CEST)
- Postal code: 23020
- Dialing code: 0342
- Website: Official website at the Wayback Machine (archived 2006-08-25)

Caspoggio is a comune (municipality) in the Province of Sondrio in the Italian region Lombardy, located about 130 kilometres (81 mi) northeast of Milan and about 11 kilometres (7 mi) north of Sondrio.

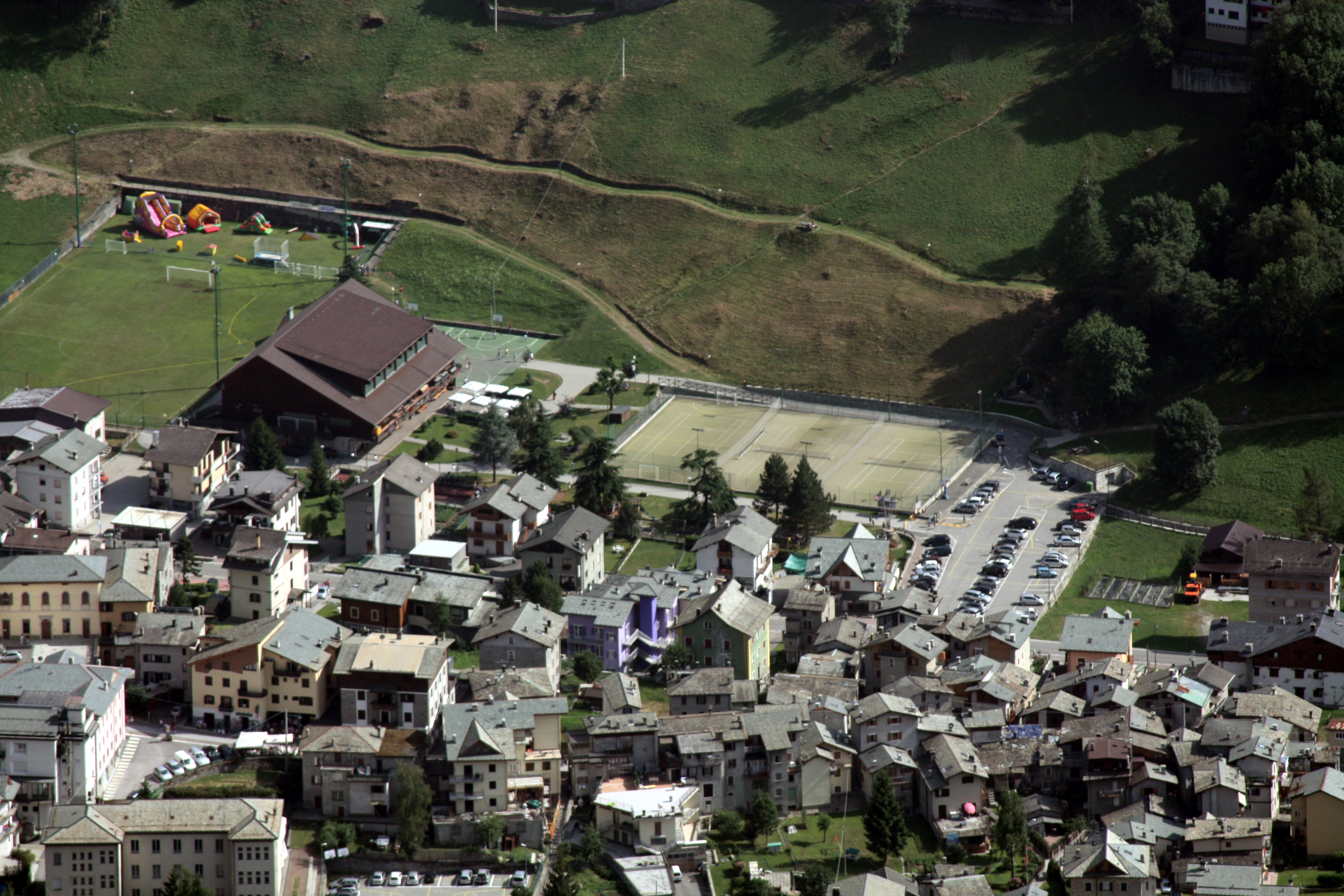
View of the town
