= Gerola Alta =

Gerola Alta Geröla (Lombard)
- Comune
- Comune di Gerola Alta
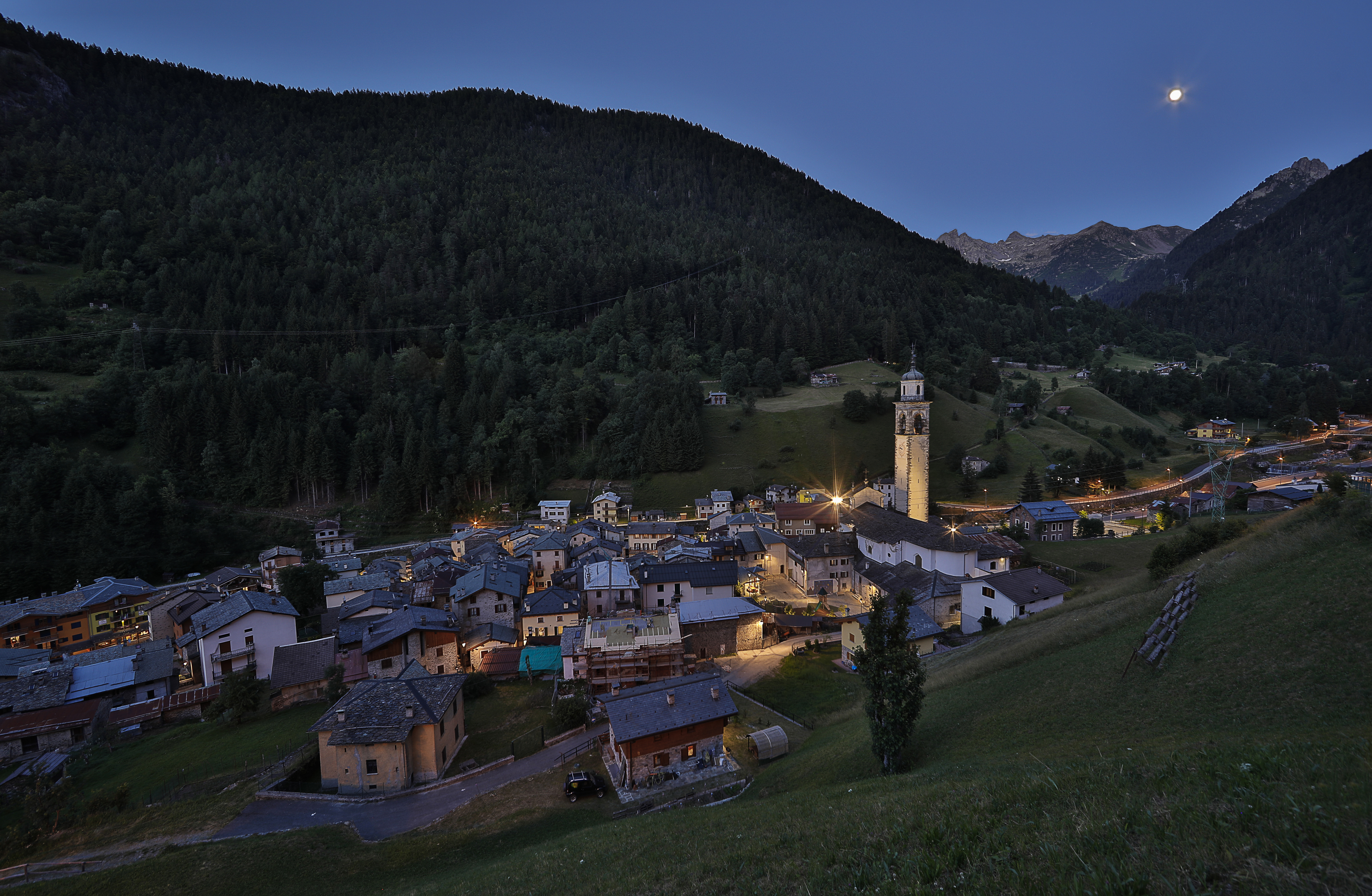

- Coat of arms

- Location within Italy Location within Lombardy
- Coordinates: 46°03′35″N 9°33′04″E
- Country: Italy
- Region: Lombardy
- Province: Sondrio (SO)
- Frazioni: Case di Sopra, Castello, Fenile, Foppa, Laveggiolo, Nasoncio, Pescegallo, Ravizze, Valle

Government
  - Mayor: Rosalba Acquistapace

Area
  - Total: 37.43 km^{2} (14.45 sq mi)

Population (31 August 2017)
  - Total: 168
  - Density: 4.49/km^{2} (11.6/sq mi)
- Demonym: Gerolesi
- Time zone: UTC+1 (CET)
  - Summer (DST): UTC+2 (CEST)
- Postal code: 23010
- Dialing code: 0342
- Patron saint: St. Bartholomew
- Saint day: 24 August
- Website: Official website

Gerola Alta (Lombard: Geröla) is a comune (municipality) in the Province of Sondrio in the Italian region Lombardy, located about 70 kilometres (43 mi) northeast of Milan and about 25 kilometres (16 mi) southwest of Sondrio.
