= Strada statale 38 dello Stelvio =

State highway in Italy

State Highway 38
- Strada statale 38

Route information
- Maintained by ANAS
- Length: 224.29 km (139.37 mi)
- Existed: 1928–present

Major junctions
- From: Piantedo
- To: Bolzano

Location
- Country: Italy
- Regions: Lombardy, Trentino-Alto Adige/Südtirol

Highway system
- Roads in Italy; Autostrade; State; Regional; Provincial; Municipal
← SS 37	→ SS 38 dir/A

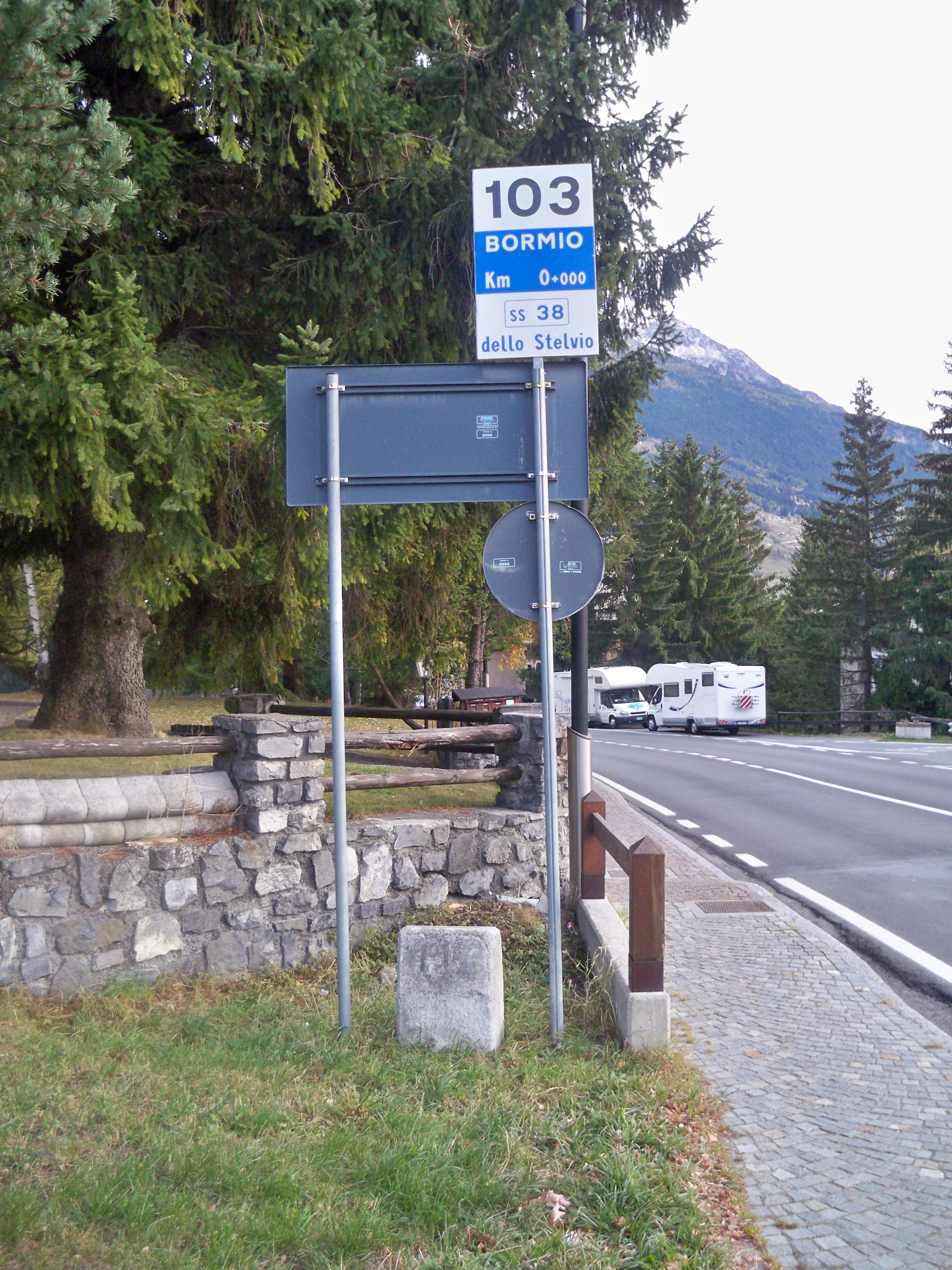
Strada statale 38 dello Stelvio in Bormio

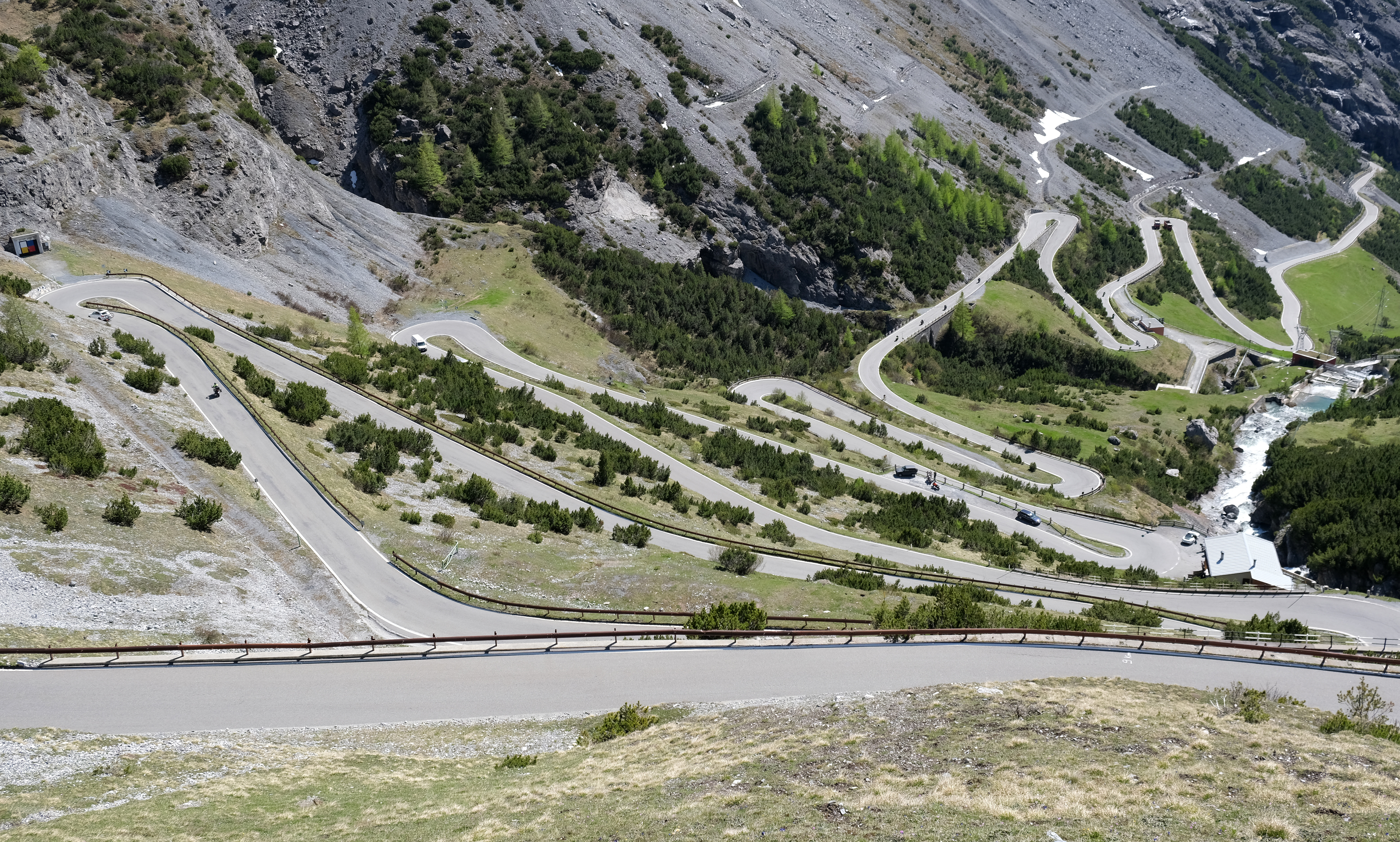
Stelvio Pass

Strada statale 38 dello Stelvio (SS 38, German: Stilfserjochstraße) is an Italian state highway 224.29 kilometres (139.37 mi) long in Italy located in the regions of Lombardy and Trentino-Alto Adige/Südtirol that connects Valtellina with the South Tyrolean Vinschgau via the Stelvio Pass (2,758 metres (9,049 ft) meters), to continue in Etschtal until it reaches Bolzano.

== Route ==
=== Sondrio ring road ===
dello Stelvio; Tangenziale di Sondrio
Exit	↓km↓	Province
Sondrio Viale dello Stadio	35.0 km (21.7 mi)	SO
Sondrio Via Vanoni	37.0 km (23.0 mi)	SO
Sondrio Via Samaden	38.0 km (23.6 mi)	SO
Sondrio Via Europa	39.5 km (24.5 mi)	SO
Sondrio Via Stelvio	40.5 km (25.2 mi)	SO

=== Sernio-Bormio variant ===
dello Stelvio; Variante Sernio-Bormio
Exit	↓km↓	Province
Sernio	68.0 km (42.3 mi)	SO
Lovero	70.0 km (43.5 mi)	SO
Vervio-Tovo di Sant'Agata	71.0 km (44.1 mi)	SO
Mazzo di Valtellina-Vione	72.5 km (45.0 mi)	SO
Grosio-Grosotto	76.5 km (47.5 mi)	SO
Sondalo; Sondalo Hospital	83.5 km (51.9 mi)	SO
Le Prese	86.0 km (53.4 mi)	SO
Valdisotto	93.0 km (57.8 mi)	SO
Valdisotto	99.0 km (61.5 mi)	SO
Bormio del Foscagno - Livigno del Passo di Gavia - Valfurva - Ponte di Legno	100.0 km (62.1 mi)	SO

== See also ==
- State highways (Italy)
- Roads in Italy
- Transport in Italy

=== Other Italian roads ===
- Autostrade of Italy
- Regional road (Italy)
- Provincial road (Italy)
- Municipal road (Italy)
