= Mazzo di Valtellina =

Mazzo di Valtellina Maz
- Comune
- Comune di Mazzo di Valtellina
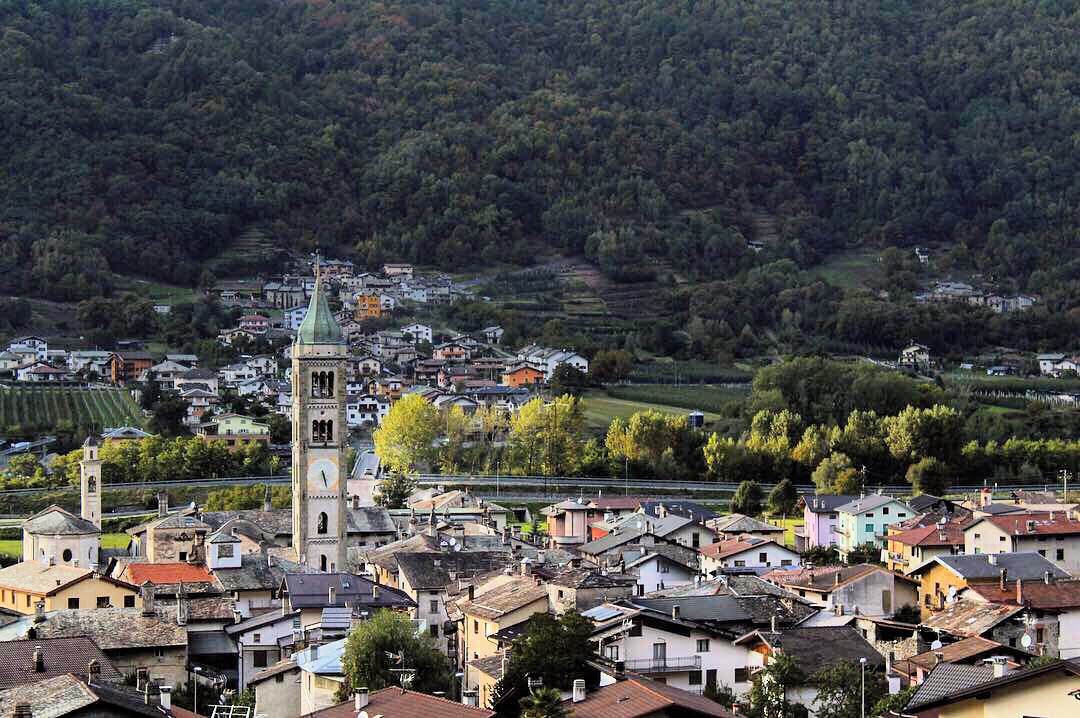

- Flag Coat of arms

- Location within Italy Location within Lombardy
- Coordinates: 46°15′N 10°15′E
- Country: Italy
- Region: Lombardy
- Province: Province of Sondrio (SO)
- Frazioni: Vione, Sparso, Cà del Papa, Piazzola, Cà Lunghe, Li Cà

Area
  - Total: 15.32 km^{2} (5.92 sq mi)
- Elevation: 552 m (1,811 ft)

Population (Jan. 2021)
  - Total: 1,022
  - Density: 66.71/km^{2} (172.8/sq mi)
- Demonym: Mazzolatti
- Time zone: UTC+1 (CET)
  - Summer (DST): UTC+2 (CEST)
- Postal code: 23030
- Dialing code: 0342
- ISTAT code: 14040
- Patron saint: Saint Stephen
- Saint day: 26 December
- Website: https://www.comune.mazzo.so.it/hh/index.php

Mazzo di Valtellina flag.svg

Mazzo di Valtellina (Maz in Valtellinese dialect) is a comune (municipality) in the Province of Sondrio in Lombardy, about 120 kilometres (75 mi) northeast of Milan.

As of 1 January 2021 the estimated population was 1,017.

Mazzo is in the upper part of Valtellina in an area of primary importance: laying at the foot of the Mortirolo Pass, it allowed easy access to the Valcamonica valley and subsequently to the territories of the Republic of Venice, which had strategic interests in trade with the German-speaking countries.

== Geography ==
Mazzo di Valtellina borders the following municipalities: Grosotto, Monno, Tovo di Sant'Agata, Vervio. The municipality covers an area of 15.32 square kilometres (5.92 mi^{2}).

The maximum altitude of the municipality is around 3000 meters above sea level. The municipality extends on both sides of the valley, which are covered with chestnut and conifer woodlands. The highest altitudes feature pastures and grassy expanses.

== Origin of the name ==
The name of Mazzo comes from the South Tyrolean family of "de Mazia" or "von Matsch", who came to Valtellina during the 11th century from the homonymous valley in Val Venosta and later adopted the name of "Venosta" due to their area of origin.

== History ==
The territory of Mazzo has been inhabited since remote and prehistoric times. This is proved by the famous rock carvings discovered in 1966 by the archaeologist Davide Pace on the Rupe Magna in Grosio, a few kilometres from Mazzo: the oldest date back to the 4th–3rd millennium BC, while the most recent to the 8th–6th centuries BC. Mazzo was conquered by the Roman Empire in 16 AD. With the disintegration of the Western Roman Empire and the Barbarian invasions, Mazzo was probably incorporated, after 489, into the Ostrogothic Kingdom of Theodoric the Great. In the same century, Christianity made its appearance in the valley.

In the 8th century, Valtellina passed under Lombard domination. Traces of this presence can be found in dialectal terms. To name just a few commonly used words, we can mention "sberlüsc" (lightning), "güdàzz" (godfather), "sluzz / slòz" (wet), "balòss" (smart, rascal), "maschérpa" (ricotta), "gnècch" (in a bad mood), "bütér" (butter), "scràna" (bench), "stracch" (tired), "trincà" (to drink), "sgrafignà" (to steal), "grignà" (to laugh), "biótt" (naked), "rüt" (rubbish, garbage), "bródeg "(dirty), "ghèi" (money).

When in 774 Charlemagne defeated the Lombards, Mazzo was subjected to the new Frankish domination. A legend (without historical foundation) has it that on the Mortirolo Pass, Charlemagne exterminated a large number of Camuni who had remained pagan, and that the pass was named after this battle.

The first written records of Mazzo date back to 795, where the presence of the homonymous parish (pieve), which extended from Sernio to Sondalo, was mentioned by the emperor of the Franks Lothair. Those who lived in the pieve enjoyed several rights (including appointment and revocation of small feudal lords, right of scabbard during the war, the appointment of parish priests etc.) which, however, were revoked over time.

After the year 1000, the parish of Mazzo dedicated to Saint Stephen played a fundamental role in the spread of the Christian faith in Valtellina (together with others including that of Samolaco, Chiavenna, Ardenno, Teglio, Bormio and Sondrio). A document from 1240 attests to its importance within the diocese of Como, of which Mazzo was one of the four main parishes.

The fragmentation of Charles' empire led to the annexation of the Kingdom of Italy to that of Germany. In the 11th century, a branch of the noble family of de Mazia or von Matsch from Val Venosta moved to Valtellina, entrusted by the emperor Henry IV with the task of keeping the Alpine passes open for the passage of imperial troops. The family adopted the name of "Venosta" due to their area of origin and decided to reside in Grosio, where they built the Villa Visconti Venosta. They were assigned the feudal rights over Mazzo by the Bishop of Como, and kept them until 1512. Moreover, they formed a strong alliance with the Visconti of Milan.

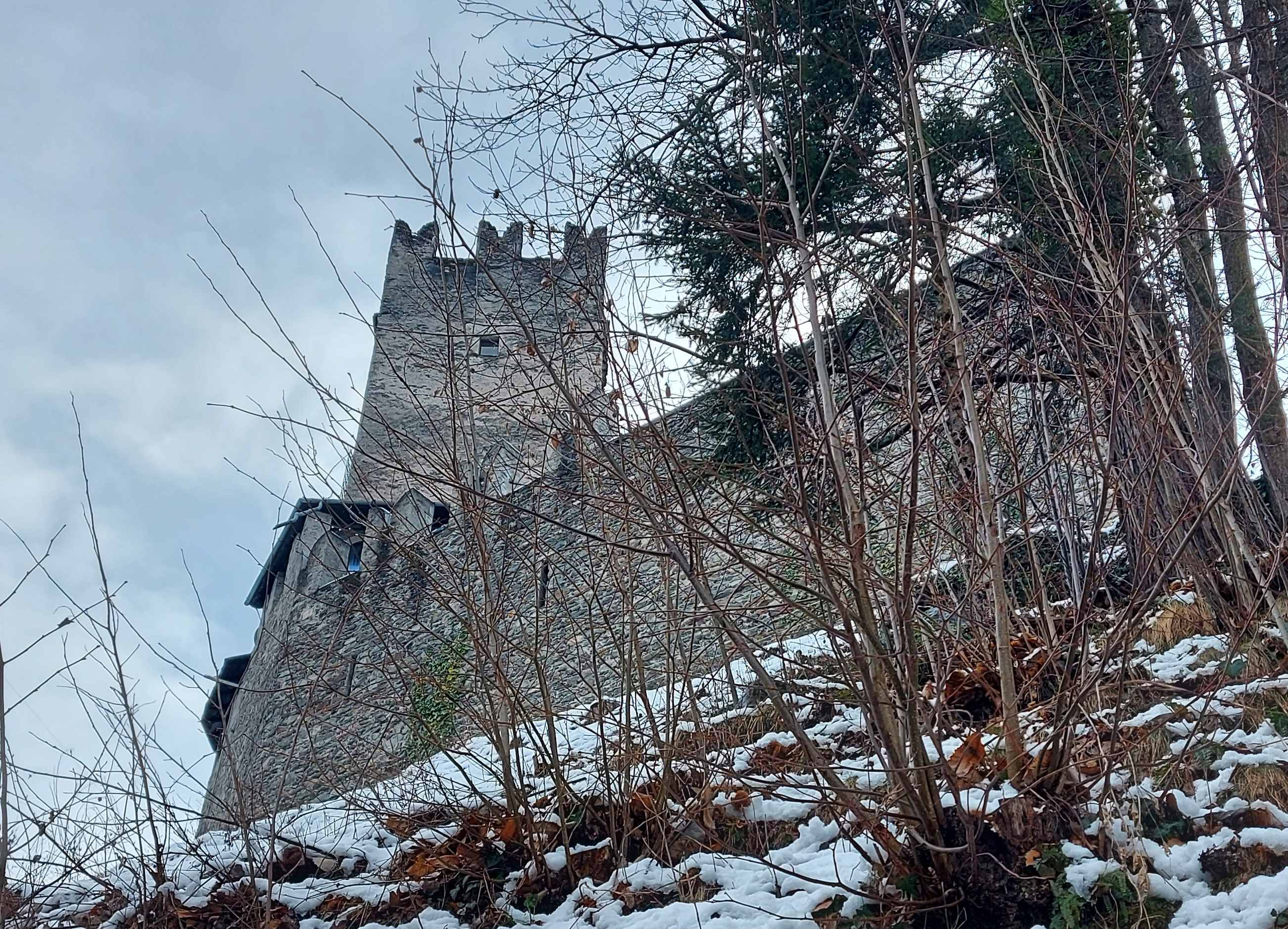
Pedenale tower, the only remnant of the castle of Mazzo

In the 13th century, the Venosta family built the "castle of Mazzo", of which today only the tower remains. The castle was part of a fortification system connecting the castles of Grosio and Tovo that allowed to control the movement of merchants and armies to and from the German-speaking countries, and the two entrances to Bormio (namely the Val Grosina and Valdisotto).

In 1335 the Visconti of Milan extended their dominion over the city of Como and the Valtellina. During the mid-15th century, they were replaced by the Sforza, who had to face the first attempts of the Swiss Three Gray Leagues to dominate the valley. After the fall of Ludovico il Moro and a short French rule, the entire valley was conquered in 1513 by the Swiss leagues and remained under their jurisdiction until 1797, when it was annexed to the newborn Cisalpine Republic together with a large part of Lombardy and Emilia-Romagna. Once the Napoleonic dominion ended, Mazzo became part of the Lombardo-Venetian Kingdom until the Unification of Italy, in 1861, when it became part of the newborn Kingdom of Italy. After the 1946 referendum, Mazzo became part of the Italian Republic.

== Coat of arms ==
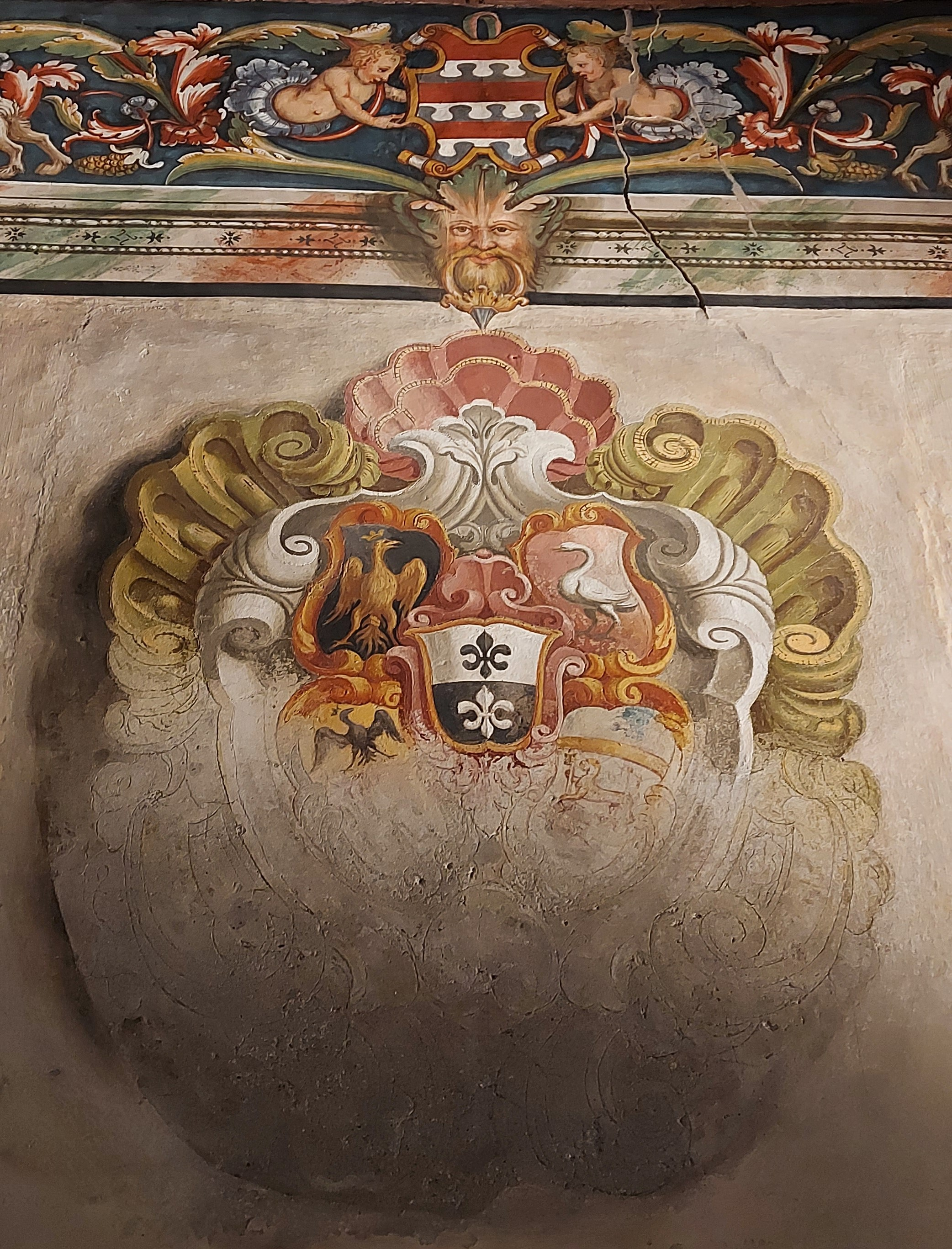
Coat of arms of Palazzo Lavizzari

Mazzo's coat of arms is green with a silver cross.

== Monuments and places of interest ==
=== The Church of Saint Abbondio ===
The church dates to the year 1400 and is well-known for its frescoes of Judgement Day. Inside there is only one big room with a wood ceiling. The sacristy was built in the base of the bell tower.

=== The church complex of Saint Mary ===
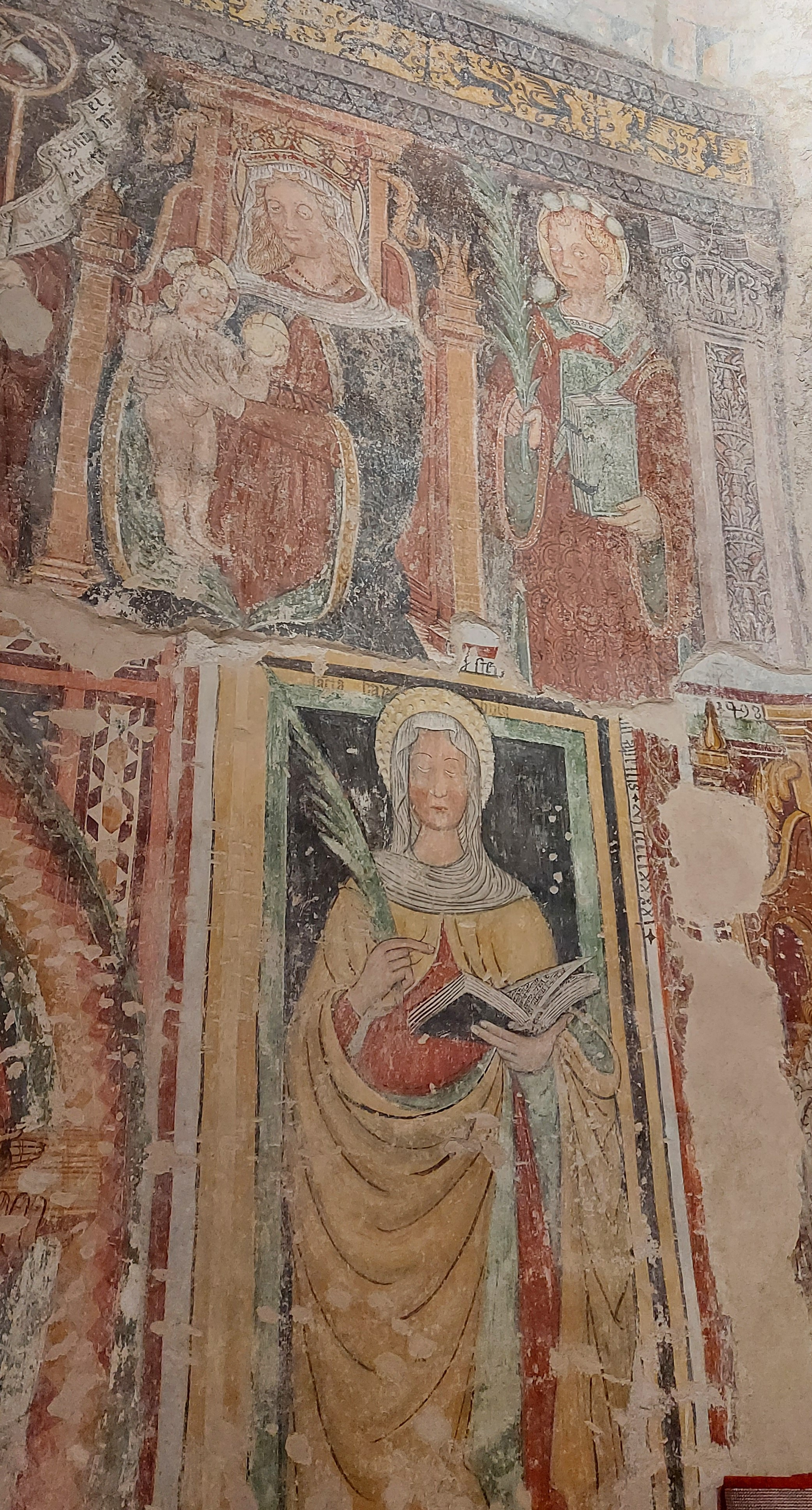
Detail of the baptistery fresco

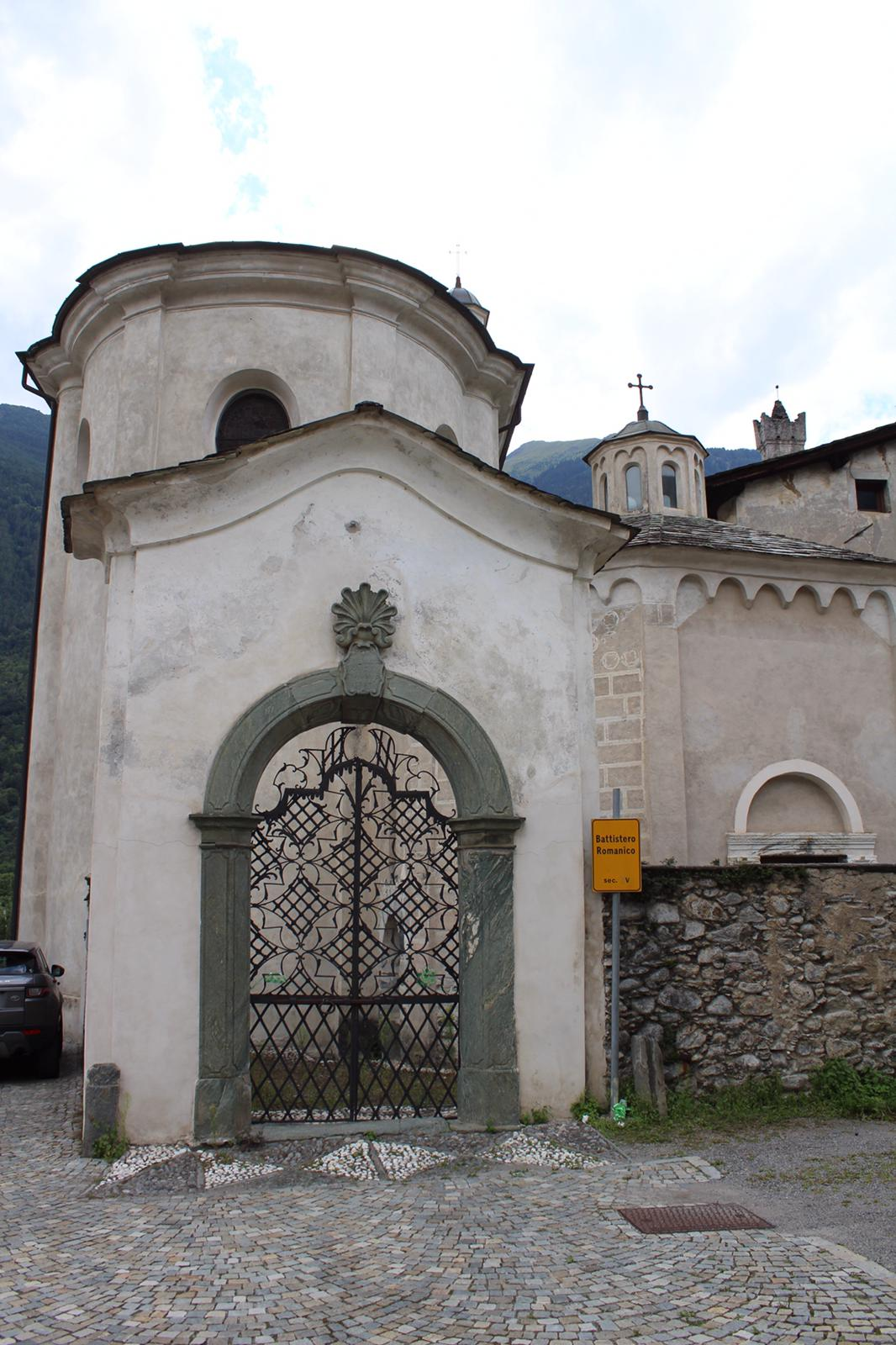
The baptistery

The church complex includes the medieval baptistery, the church of Saint Mary built in 1452 and the 17th-century oratory (a small chapel for private prayer or worship). The complex was renovated in the 17th century and later in the 19th century. A recent renovation revealed that the outside walls were covered with ancient frescoes depicting coats of arms, inscriptions, zodiac signs and the representation of the Months.

==== The baptistery ====
The baptistery dates to the late Middle Ages and is the oldest monument in Mazzo. It is built on the ruins of a pagan temple; at the beginning, it had a circular shape and was bigger, but it was rebuilt in the 11th century in the shape of an octagon, which has a strong symbolic value (it represents the seven days of the Divine Creation in addition to Judgement Day).

A 16th-century front door engraved with the figure of the Annunciation to Mary allows entering the Baptistery. The 7th-century plunge pool located inside the baptistery is the most ancient in Valtellina. Frescoes from the 15th century represent the Trinity, Saint Barbara, Saint Stephen and John the Baptist.

=== Saint Stephen's Collegial Church ===
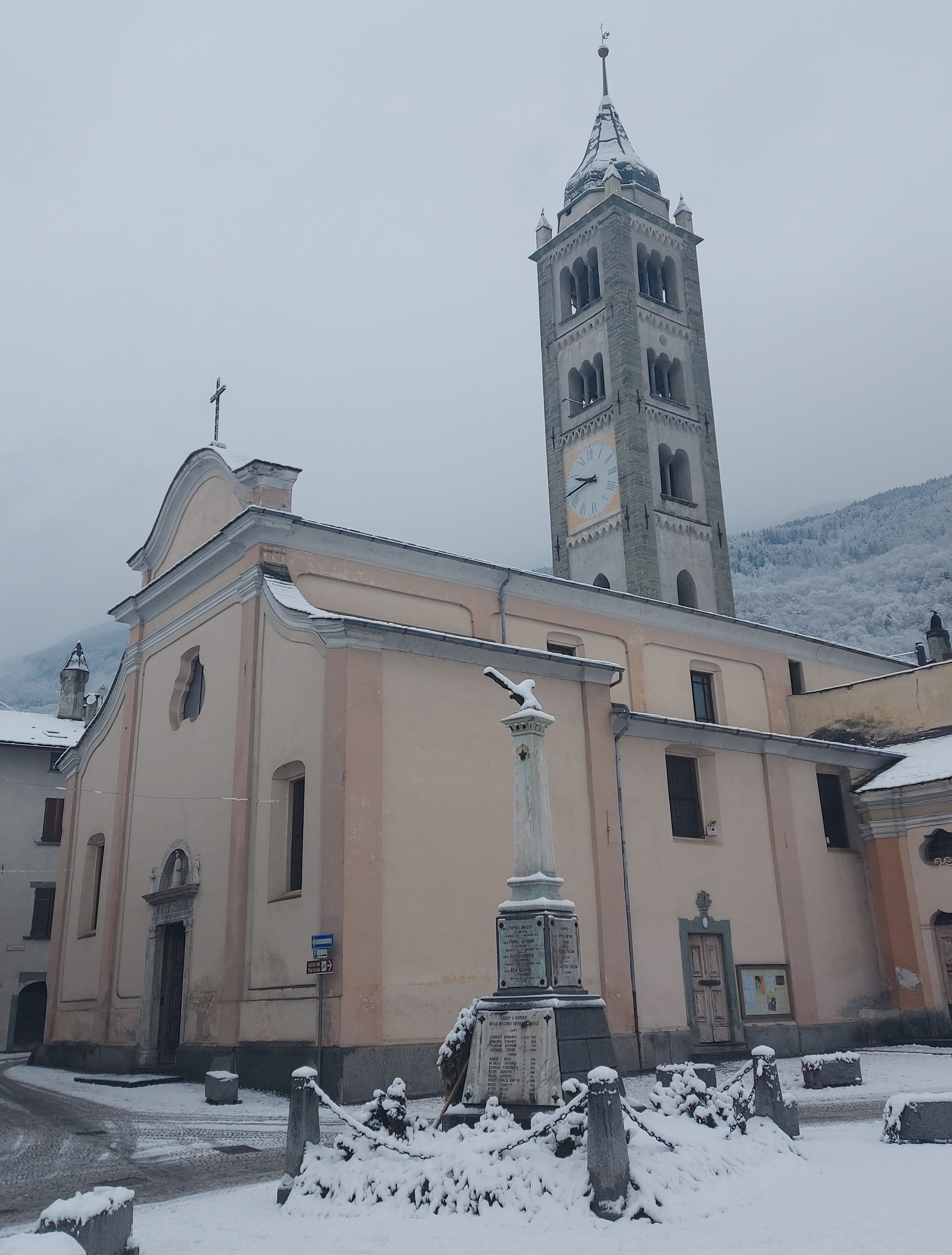
Saint Stephen's church in wintertime

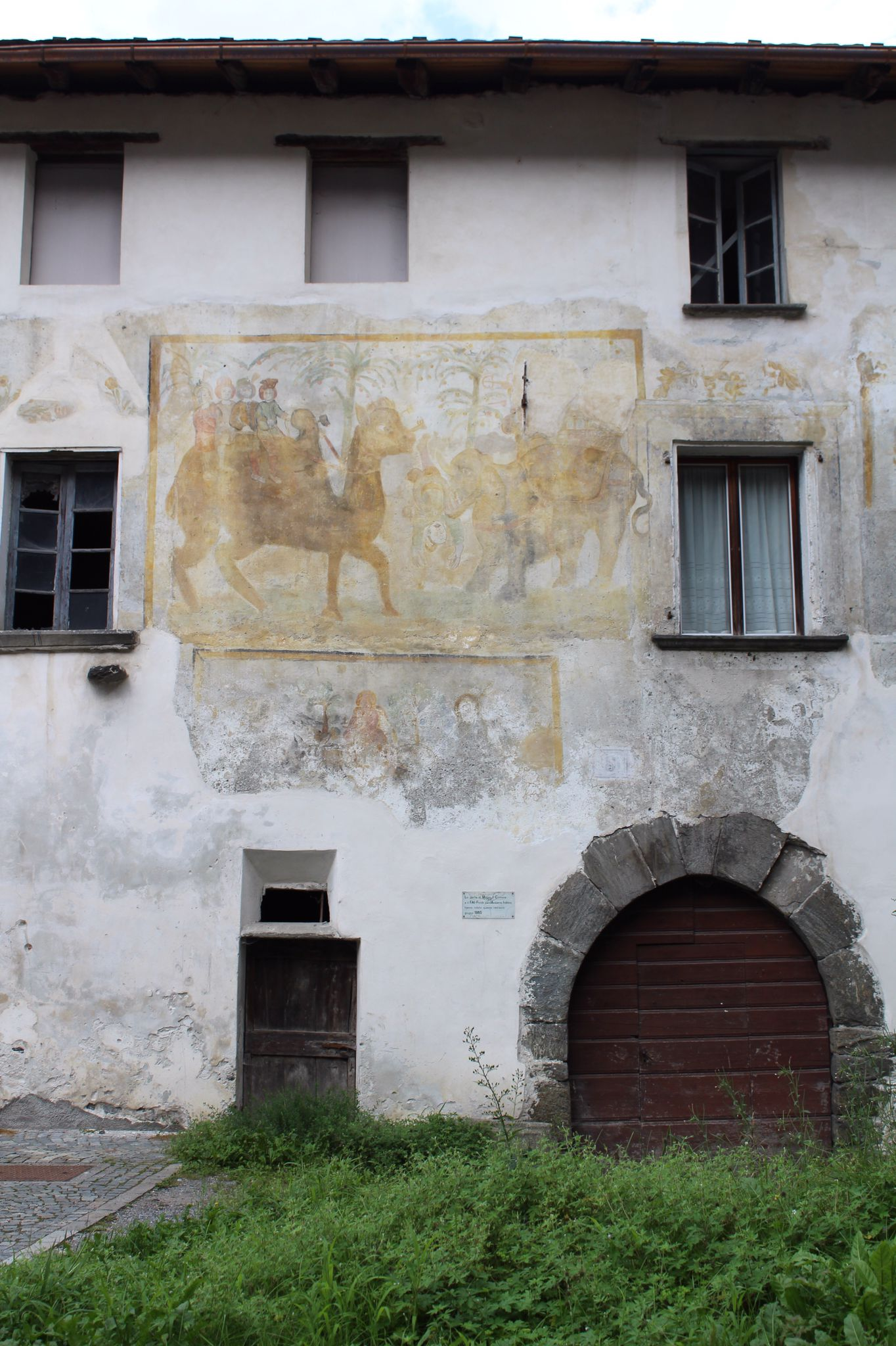
The fresco in Vicolo della Torre

The church was probably built in the 8th century and then it was renovated in the 1530s after the crash of the bell tower in 1522. The latter has four openings with gothic elements. The carved main door is from 1597; the frame around it was made by Bernardino da Maroggia with white marble in 1508. The baroque interior presents three Naves and a sculptured statue of the Virgin carved in 1609. On both sides of Mary, there are the statues of Bishop Nicola and Bishop Carlo Borromeo, surrounded by twenty-five images of the Rosary. The white marble altar replaced a precious triptych made with gilded wood currently on display at the Poldi Pezzoli Museum in Milan.

==== The Altar of the Virgin Mary ====
The altar of Saint Stephen's church was commissioned by the Confraternity of Rosary and carved in 1609. The statue of the Virgin in the central recess probably dates to the previous century. The Virgin had a rich outfit with precious dresses and jewellery. Nothing has remained of it except for the 18th-century brocade cloak. On the sides, we can find the statues of the Saints Carlo Borromeo (on the right) and Nicola (on the left). All around them, 15 pictures represent the Mystery of Rosary. On the left, we find the joyful rosary mysteries, to the right the glorious mysteries and above the recess, there are the sorrowful mysteries. An elegant fence made by Giovanni Battista Scalvino in 1614 surrounds the altar.

=== Church of San Matteo (Saint Matthew) ===
The construction of the baroque church started in 1667. On the external façade, we can see a fresco from Giambattista Muttoni, while inside paintings from Francesco Piatti represent four episodes of the Old and New Testament.

Most of the furniture was lost following the profanation of 1945 and the resulting abandonment. The church was renovated and sanctified in the early 2000s.

The little stone mountain hut visible a few metres above the church is in reality an older church: the semi-circular apse on the back has maintained its structure and on the façade there is a fresco from the artist Valorsa.

=== The fresco in Vicolo della Torre ===
The 15th-century painting on a house in Vicolo della Torre, which depicts scenes of battles with camels and elephants, tropical plants and oriental figures, attests to the connection of Mazzo with the Republic of Venice, whose merchants crossed the Mortirolo Pass to reach the Raetia.

=== Lavizzari Mansion (Palazzo Lavizzari) ===
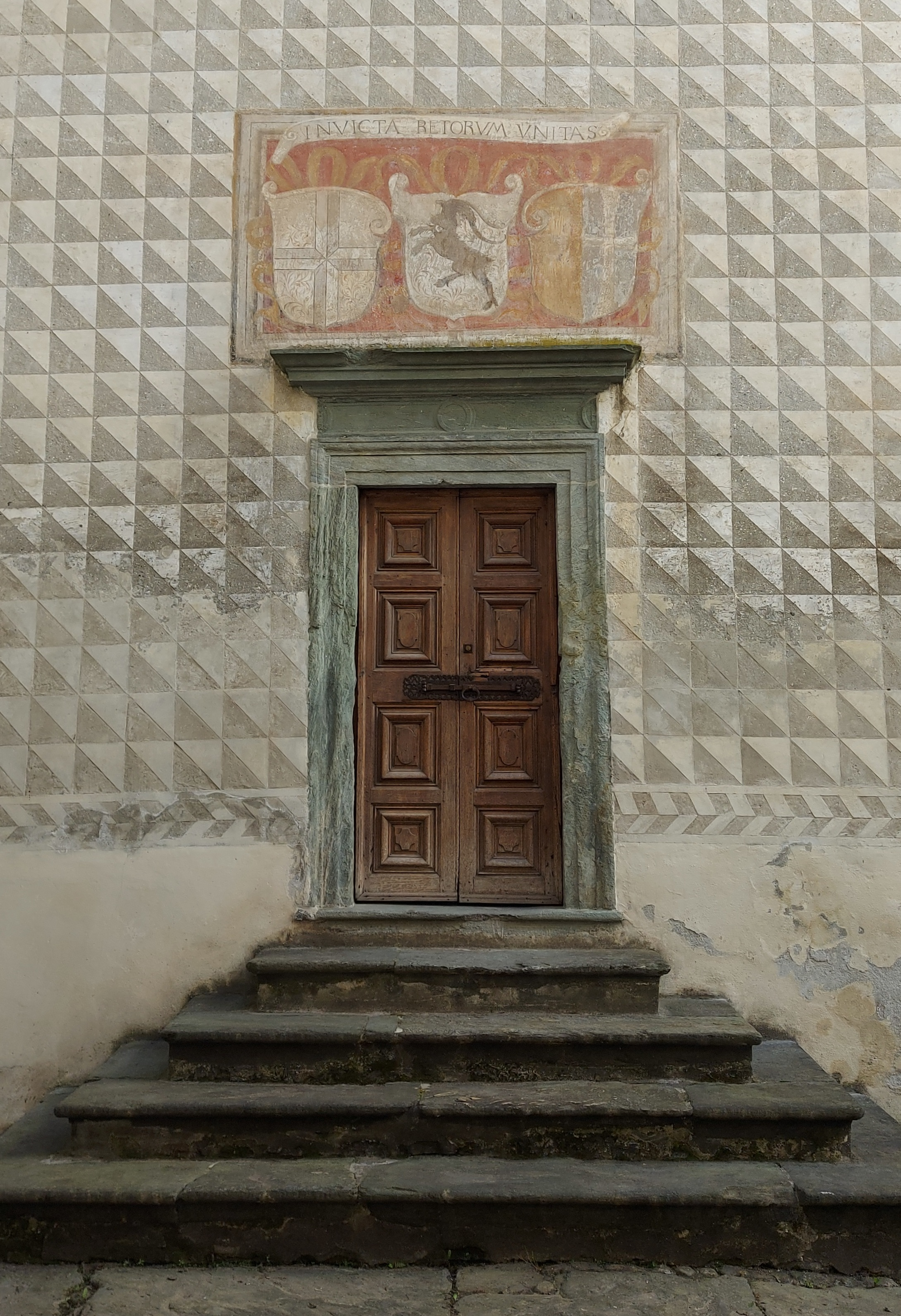
Fresco on Palazzo Lavizzari with the Grisons coat of arms

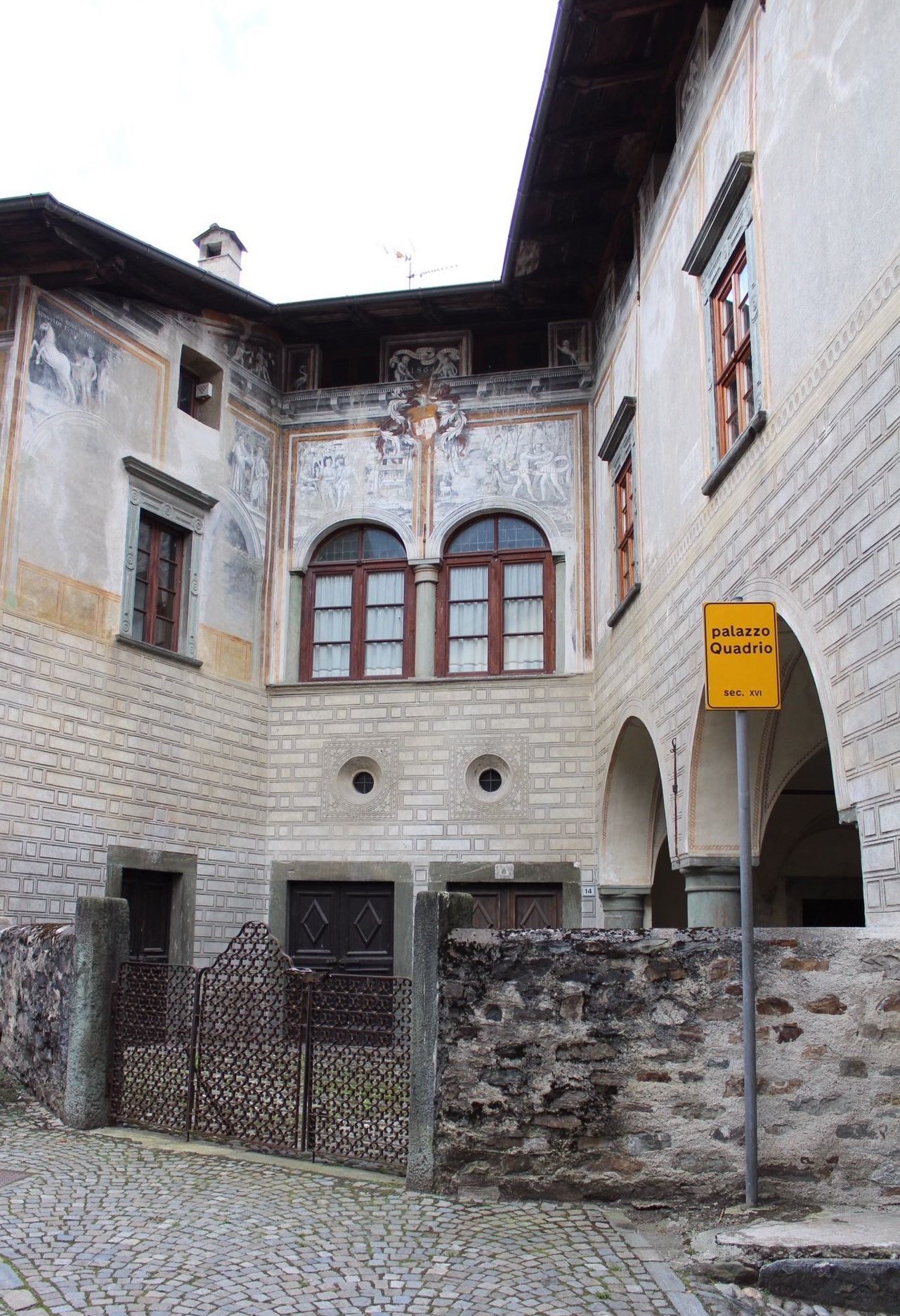
Palazzo Quadrio

The house was built in 1536 and is composed of two parts: the oldest one belongs to the Venosta Family and the newest one to the Lambertenghi Family. In 1650 the mansion became the property of the Lavizzari Family.

On the front door, there is the coat of arms of the Three Leagues, that links the mansion to the history of Valtellina: when the valley was under Swiss rule, three Swiss leagues formed in 1471 an alliance to protect themselves from the Austrian power, leading eventually to the formation of the Canton of Grisons.

The large hall on the ground floor, the "Salone degli Stemmi", was frescoed in 1543 with a heraldic frieze representing the coats of arms of families linked, by kinship or friendship, to the owners. The coffered ceiling dates back to 1536. Until the 1970s the hall was used as a cinema and theatre.

=== Quadrio Mansion (Palazzo Quadrio) ===
Renovated in the 16th century, the mansion presents many decorations on the external wall: in the lower part, there are inscribed images, whereas in the upper part monochromatic frescos represent the Muses and the moment in which Paris awards Venus with the golden Apple of Discord.

=== Venosta Mansion (Palazzo Venosta) ===
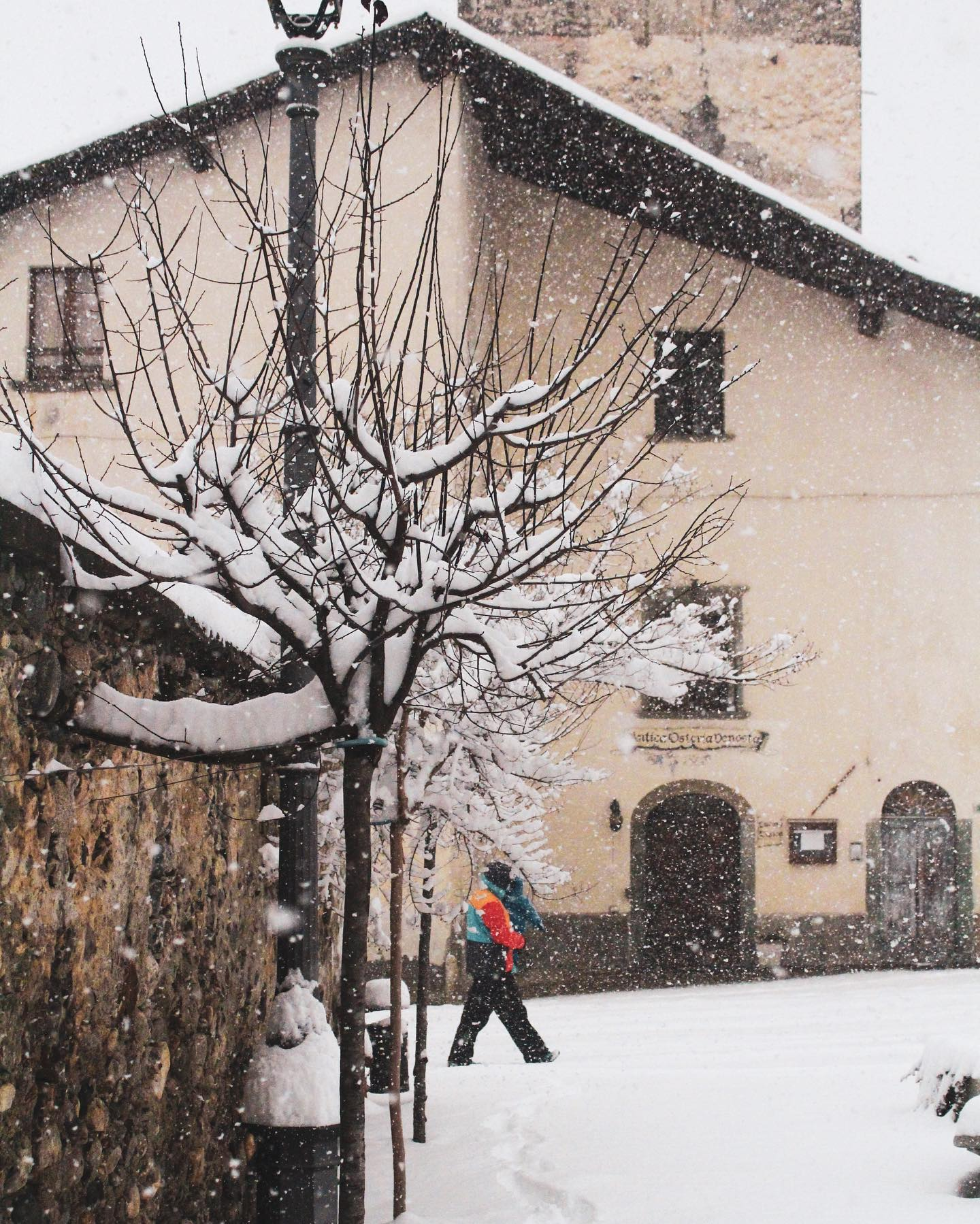
Palazzo Venosta in the snow

The Venosta palace is easily recognizable for the mighty tower with the function of dovecote that most likely had a symbolic connotation linked to the power and dominion of the Venosta family, embodied by the flight of doves over the territory.

Palazzo Venosta features a sixteenth-century portico and loggia, and a stüa of particular beauty.

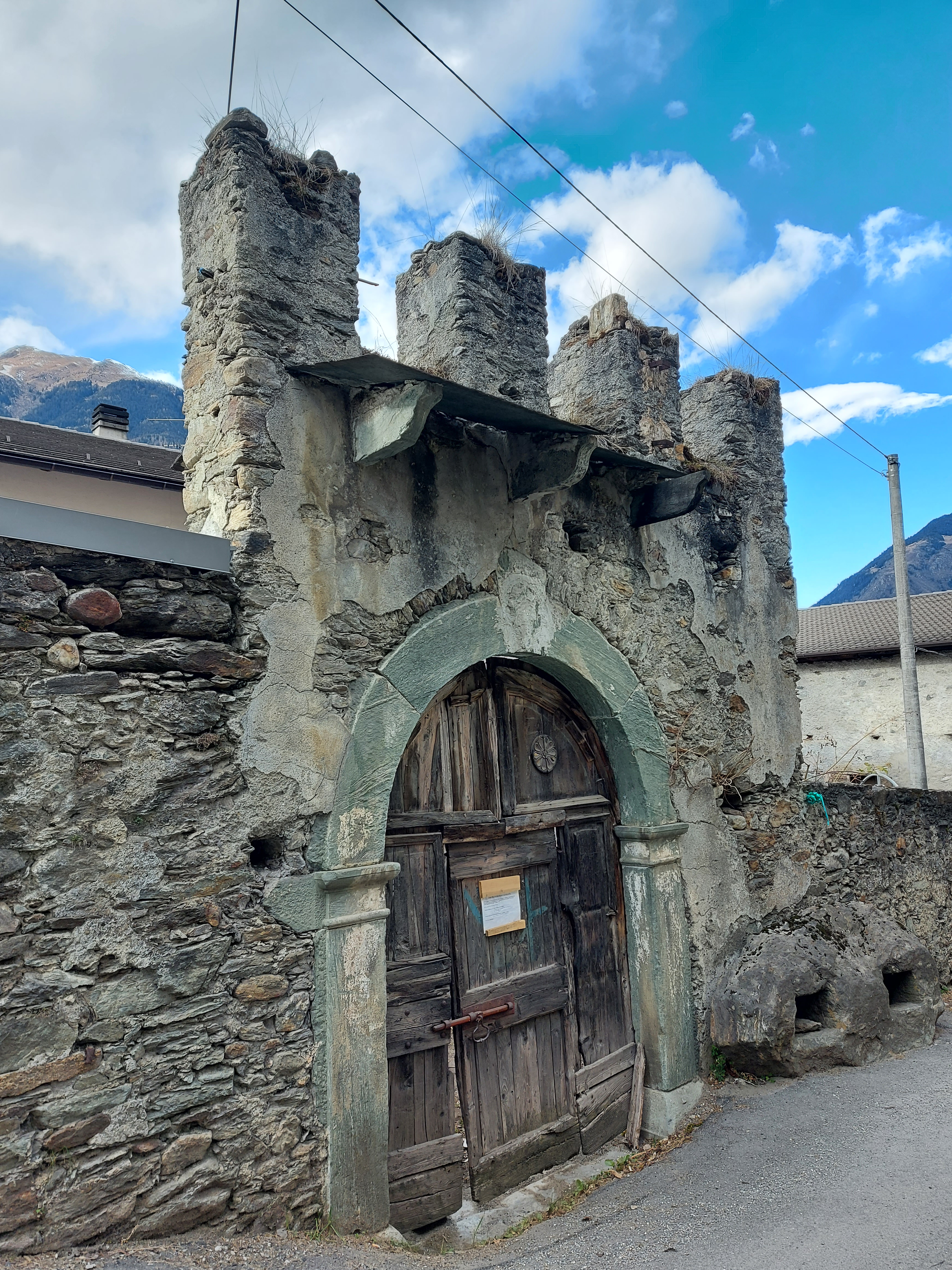
The ruins of the castle walls at the town limits

=== Pedenale Tower ===
The Castle of Mazzo was part of a fortified system built by the Venosta family that protected about twenty kilometers of territory, from Sernio to just beyond Sondalo, and included the castles of Tovo and Grosio. This area was in fact of strategic importance as it allowed to control the two accesses to Bormio (namely Valgrosina and Valdisotto) and the movements of merchants and armies to and from the German-speaking countries.

Built in the 13th century, the castle of Mazzo, whose defensive walls originally reached the limits of the town, was dismantled in the 16th century by the Grisons. Of it, only the four-storey rectangular tower has remained, with arrow-loops and windows through which archers would launch arrows to defend the castle.

Around the tower, we can see the ruins of the houses that constituted the hamlet of Pedenale.

== Economy ==
The economy until the sixties was mainly agricultural (cereals, potatoes, vegetables, fodder and fruit) and based on cattle breeding. In recent times, dairy and bresaola production are of particular importance. There are also wood and mechanical industries. Another thriving sector is that of apple cultivation.

== Demographic evolution ==
Historical population

| Year | Pop. | ±% |
|---|---|---|
| 1861 | 1,285 | — |
| 1871 | 1,375 | +7.0% |
| 1881 | 1,503 | +9.3% |
| 1901 | 1,296 | −13.8% |
| 1911 | 1,333 | +2.9% |
| 1921 | 1,357 | +1.8% |

| Year | Pop. | ±% |
|---|---|---|
| 1931 | 1,106 | −18.5% |
| 1936 | 1,132 | +2.4% |
| 1951 | 1,052 | −7.1% |
| 1961 | 972 | −7.6% |
| 1971 | 890 | −8.4% |
| 1981 | 950 | +6.7% |

| Year | Pop. | ±% |
|---|---|---|
| 1991 | 1,010 | +6.3% |
| 2001 | 1,045 | +3.5% |
| 2011 | 1,041 | −0.4% |
| 2021 | 1,028 | −1.2% |
