= Mortirolo Pass =

High mountain pass in the Alps in Italy

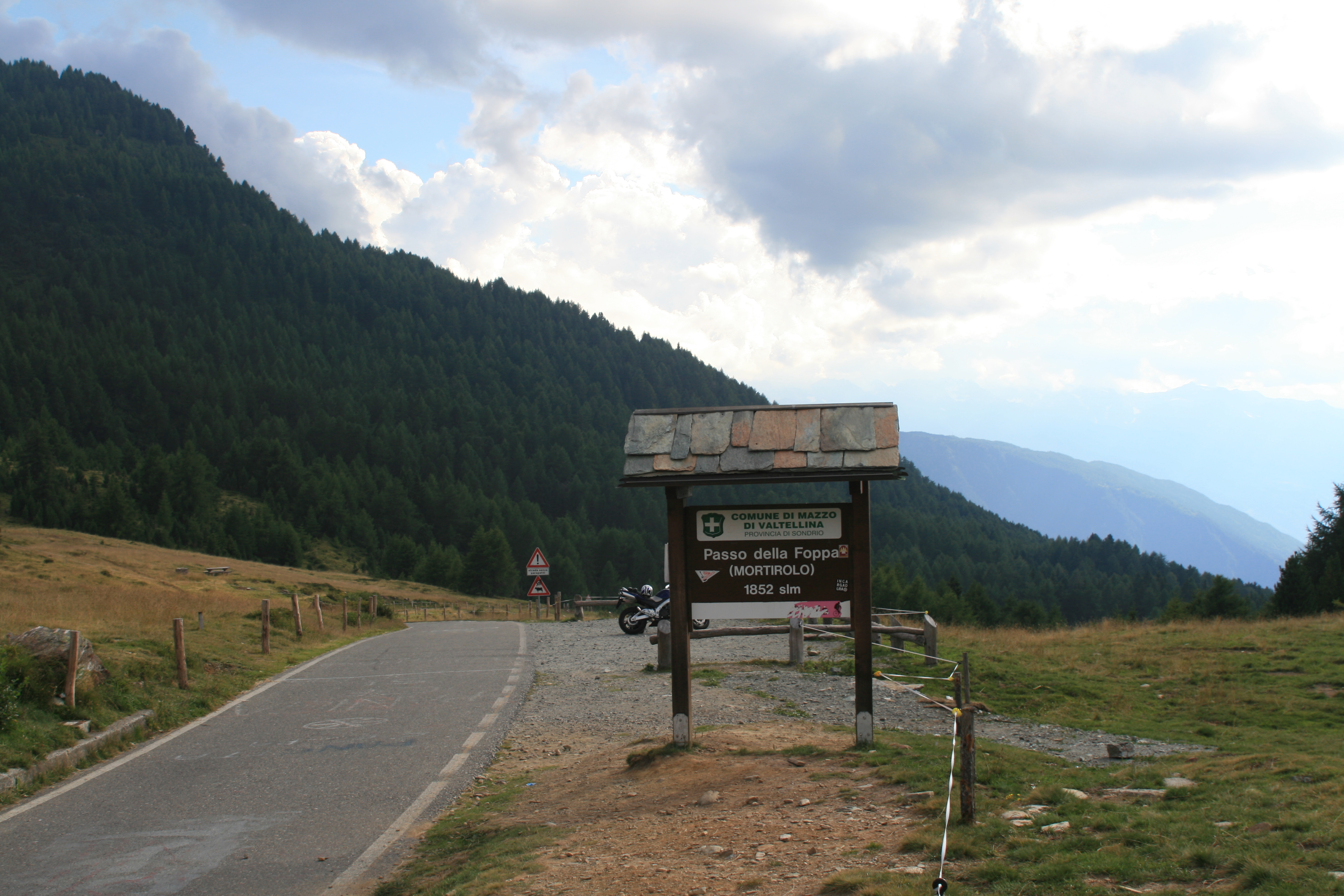

- Location within Alps
- Elevation: 1,852 metres (6,076 ft)

Third Approach
- Location: Sondrio/Brescia (Lombardy), Italy
- Range: Italian Alps
- Coordinates: 46°14′53″N 10°17′57″E

The Mortirolo Pass (Italian: Passo del Mortirolo) (el. 1852 m.) is a high mountain pass in the Alps in Italy. Also known as Passo della Foppa, it connects Mazzo di Valtellina (province of Sondrio) and Val Camonica (province of Brescia). The road from Mazzo di Valtellina is one of the most demanding climbs in professional road bicycle racing, having been used in the Giro d'Italia stage race many times.

In May 2004, while training in the Italian Alps, Lance Armstrong said that it was the hardest climb he had ever ridden.

== Details of the climb ==
The mountain pass can be climbed from four different starting points, although the road departing from Mazzo di Valtellina is the most famous and only twice the Giro d'Italia climbed the mountain from alternative sides.

- From Mazzo di Valtellina: the actual climb to the summit starts at Mazzo di Valtellina and is 12.4 kilometres long at an average of 10.5% (height gain: 1300 m), the maximum gradient being 18%.
- From Grosio: the actual climb to the summit starts at Grosio and is 14.8 kilometres long at an average of 8.3% (height gain: 1222 m).
- From Edolo: the actual climb to the summit starts at Edolo and is 17.2 kilometres long at an average of 6.7% (height gain: 1153 m).
- From Tovo di Sant'Agata: the actual climb to the summit starts at Tovo and is 11.4 kilometres long at an average of 10.5% (height gain: 1194 m).

== Giro d'Italia ==
Monument to Marco Pantani.

The Mortirolo Pass featured several times in the Giro d'Italia, usually as the last or penultimate climb before the finish of the stage. The first time was in Stage 15 of the 1990 Giro d'Italia, between Morbegno and Aprica, starting from Edolo. Due to the steepness of the descent and the crashes that were occurring, the organisers decided to climb this mountain starting from Mazzo in subsequent years.

Since the death of Marco Pantani in 2004, stages of the Giro that go over the Mortirolo feature a special prize to the first man at the top of the pass, called Cima Pantani ("Pantani Top"). A monument to Marco Pantani was erected in 2006 by the Italian Professional Riders Association at the eighth kilometre of the road from Mazzo di Valtellina.

== First rider passing Mortirolo in Giro d'Italia ==
Year	Name	Country	Stage	Side
1990	Leonardo Sierra	Venezuela	17	Edolo
1991	Franco Chioccioli	Italy	15	Mazzo di Valtellina
1994	Marco Pantani	Italy	15	Mazzo di Valtellina
1996	Ivan Gotti	Italy	21	Mazzo di Valtellina
1997	Wladimir Belli	Italy	21	Mazzo di Valtellina
1999	Ivan Gotti	Italy	21	Mazzo di Valtellina
2004	Raffaele Illiano	Italy	19	Mazzo di Valtellina
2006	Ivan Basso	Italy	20	Mazzo di Valtellina
2008	Toni Colom	Spain	20	Mazzo di Valtellina
2010	Ivan Basso	Italy	19	Mazzo di Valtellina
2012	Oliver Zaugg	Switzerland	20	Tovo di Sant'Agata
2015	Steven Kruijswijk	Netherlands	16	Mazzo di Valtellina
2017	Luis León Sánchez	Spain	16	Edolo
2019	Giulio Ciccone	Italy	16	Mazzo di Valtellina
2022	Koen Bouwman	Netherlands	16	Edolo
2024	Christian Scaroni	Italy	15	Edolo
2025	Afonso Eulálio	Portugal	17	Monno

== See also ==
- List of highest paved roads in Europe
- List of mountain passes
