= Edolo =

Edolo Édol
- Comune
- Comune di Edolo
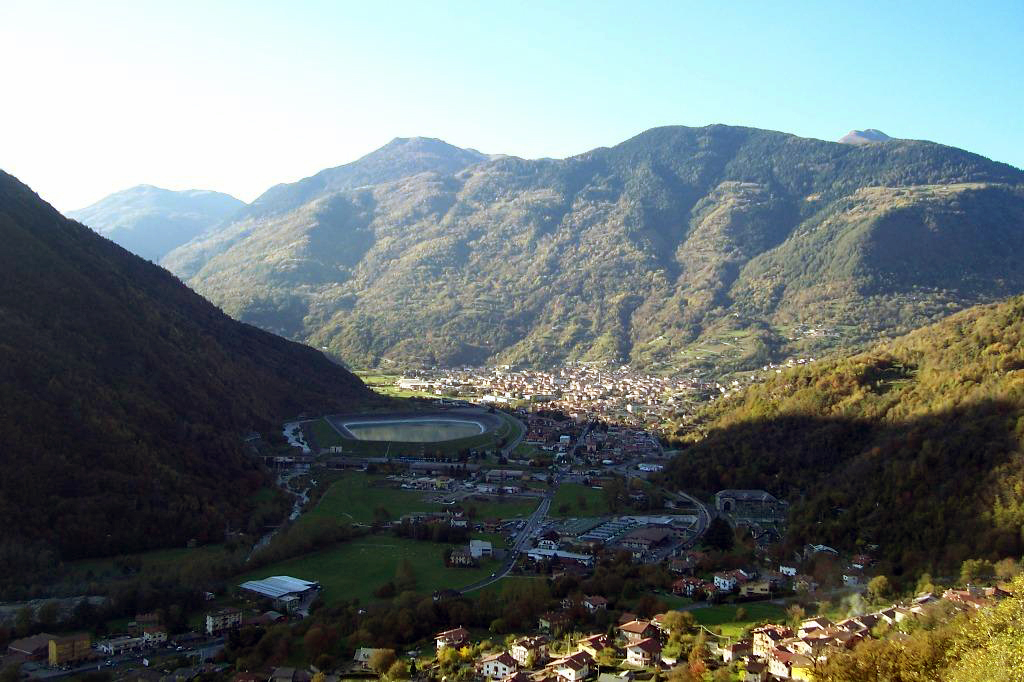

- Coat of arms

- Location within Italy Location within Lombardy
- Coordinates: 46°10′44″N 10°19′48″E
- Country: Italy
- Region: Lombardy
- Province: Brescia (BS)
- Frazioni: Cortenedolo, Vico, Mù

Government
  - Mayor: Luca Masneri

Area
  - Total: 88.9 km^{2} (34.3 sq mi)
- Elevation: 720 m (2,360 ft)

Population (31 July 2017)
  - Total: 4,532
  - Density: 51.0/km^{2} (132/sq mi)
- Demonym: Edolesi
- Time zone: UTC+1 (CET)
  - Summer (DST): UTC+2 (CEST)
- Postal code: 25048
- Dialing code: 0364
- Patron saint: Santa Maria nascente
- Saint day: September 8
- Website: Official website

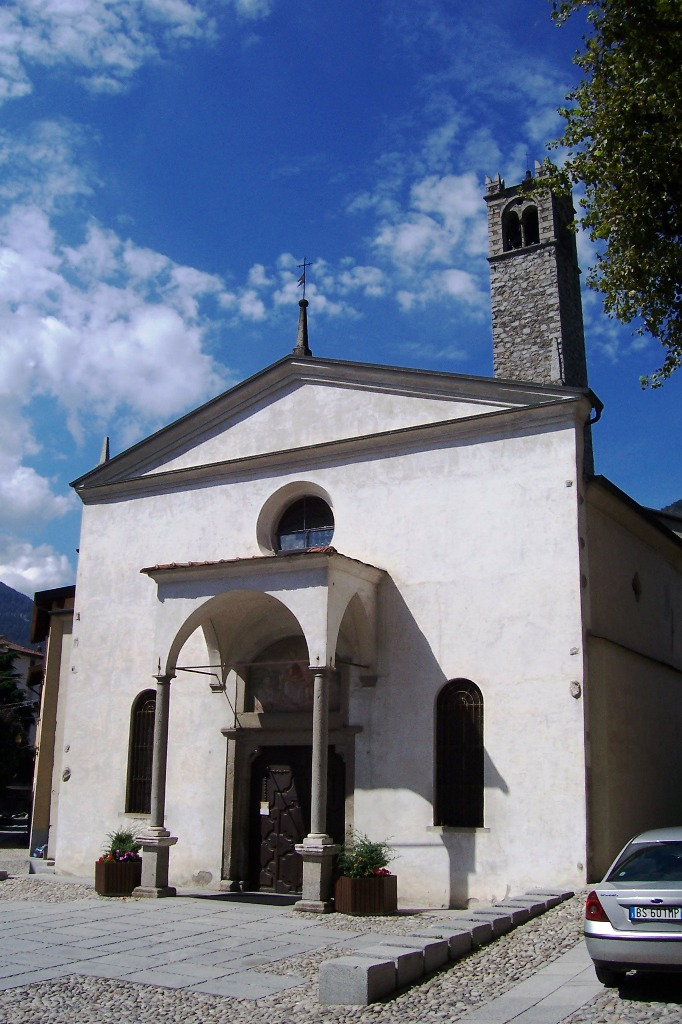
San Giovanni church

Edolo (Camunian: Édol) is a town and comune in the province of Brescia, Lombardy, northern Italy, located in the upper Camonica valley. Edolo is neighbour to the comuni of Corteno Golgi, Incudine, Lovero, Malonno, Monno, Ponte di Legno, Saviore dell'Adamello, Sernio, Sonico, Temù, Tovo di Sant'Agata, Vezza d'Oglio and Vione.

Edolo houses the northern terminus of the Brescia–Iseo–Edolo railway operated by Trenord. It is also the location of the Edolo Pumped Storage Plant.

Despite Edolo's close distance (32 km by road) to Tirano and the border with Switzerland, there is no train connection between the two towns. In the summer, a bus service connects Edolo (for trains towards Brescia) and Tirano (for the Rhaetian Railway towards the Bernina Pass).
