= Lovero =

- Comune
- Comune di Lovero
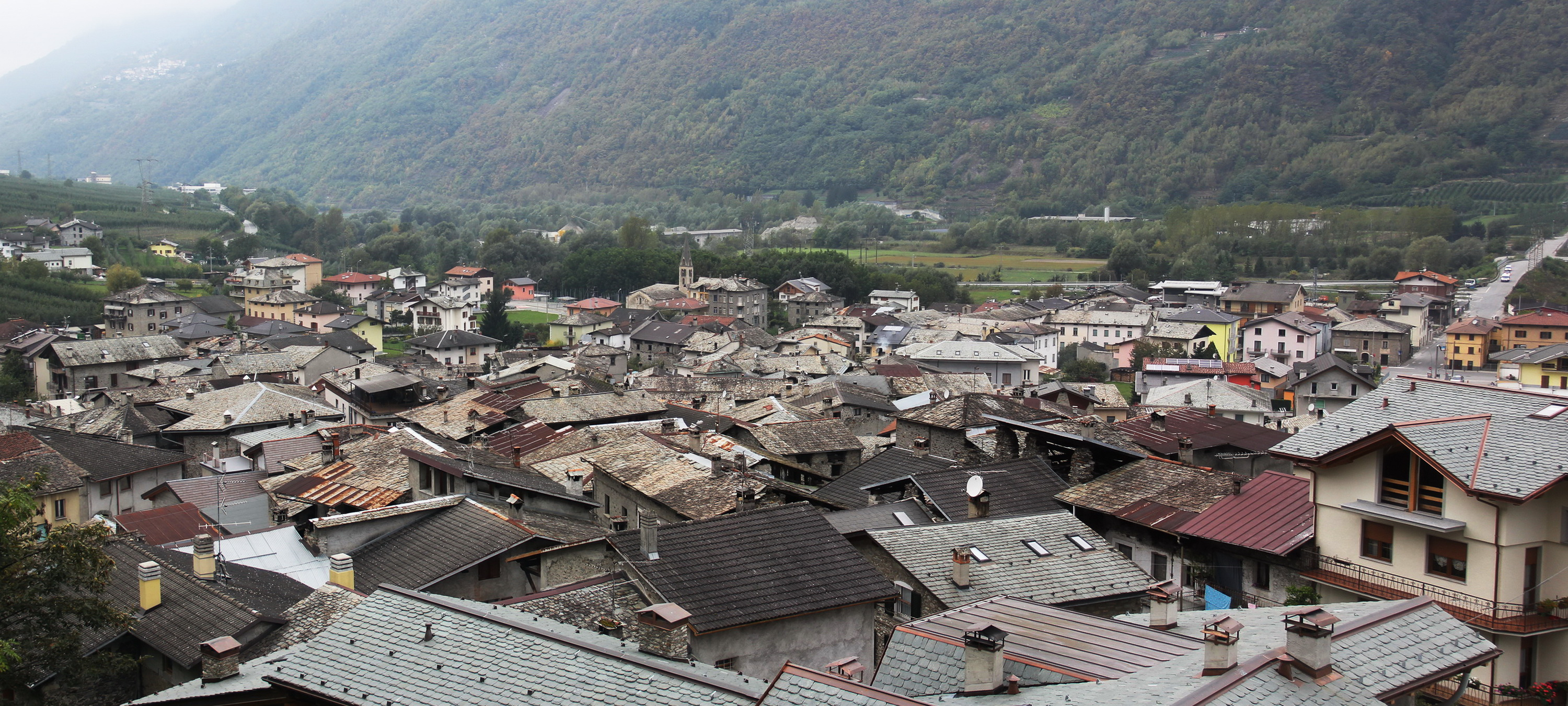

- Location within Italy Location within Lombardy
- Coordinates: 46°14′N 10°14′E
- Country: Italy
- Region: Lombardy
- Province: Province of Sondrio (SO)

Area
  - Total: 13.4 km^{2} (5.2 sq mi)

Population (Dec. 2004)
  - Total: 663
  - Density: 49.5/km^{2} (128/sq mi)
- Time zone: UTC+1 (CET)
  - Summer (DST): UTC+2 (CEST)
- Postal code: 23030
- Dialing code: 0342

Lovero is a comune (municipality) in the Province of Sondrio in the Italian region Lombardy, located about 120 kilometres (75 mi) northeast of Milan and about 30 kilometres (19 mi) east of Sondrio. As of 31 December 2004, it had a population of 663 and an area of 13.4 square kilometres (5.2 mi^{2}).

Lovero borders the following municipalities: Edolo, Sernio, Tovo di Sant'Agata, Vervio.

== Demographic evolution ==
Historical population

Year	Pop.	±%
1861	1,095	—
1871	1,047	−4.4%
1881	1,121	+7.1%
1901	1,161	+3.6%
1911	1,061	−8.6%

Year	Pop.	±%
1921	1,081	+1.9%
1931	932	−13.8%
1936	862	−7.5%
1951	837	−2.9%
1961	811	−3.1%

Year	Pop.	±%
1971	730	−10.0%
1981	707	−3.2%
1991	686	−3.0%
2001	635	−7.4%

Source: Data from ISTAT
