= Grosotto =

- Comune
- Comune di Grosotto
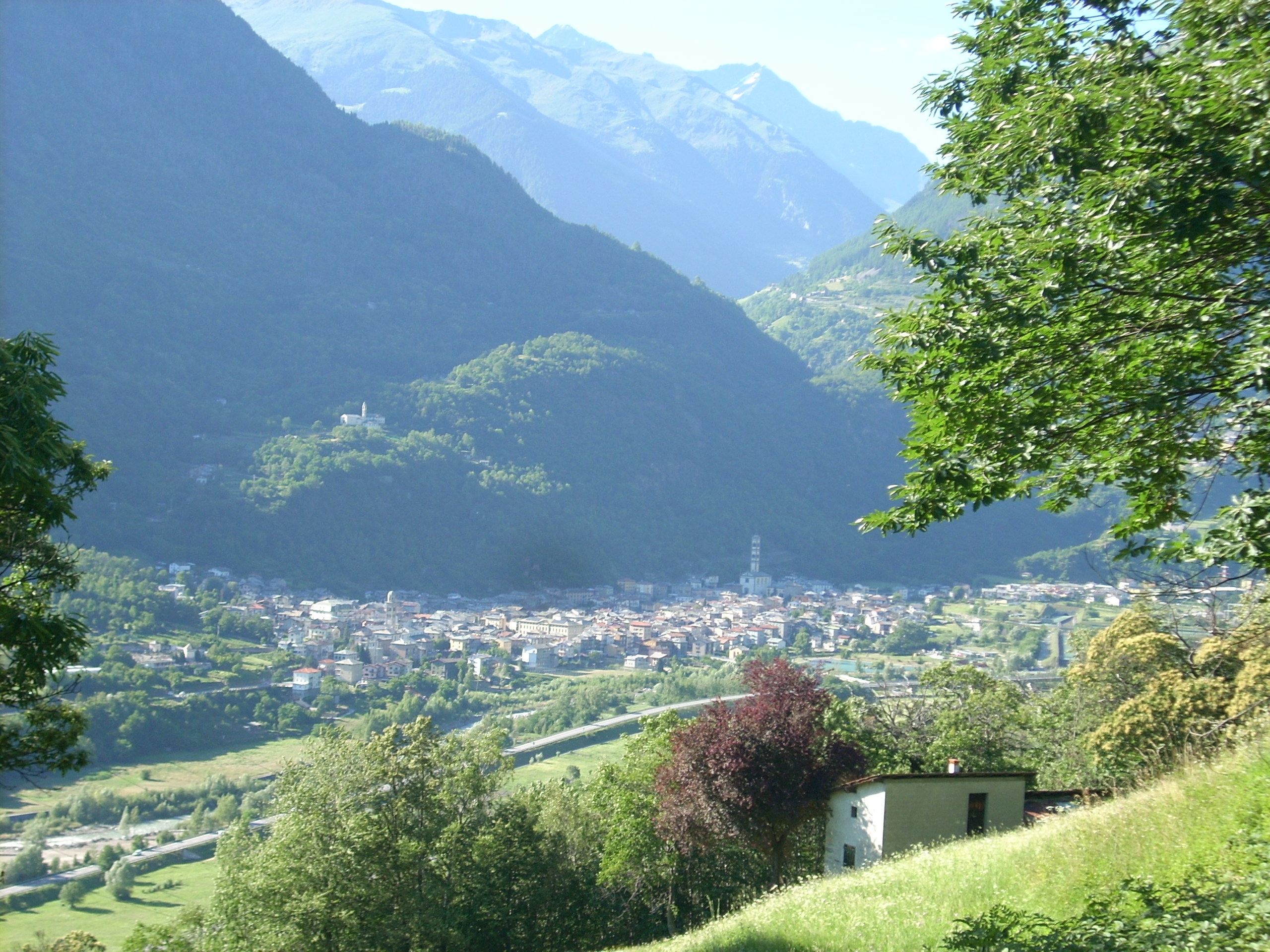

- Coat of arms

- Location within Italy Location within Lombardy
- Coordinates: 46°17′N 10°16′E
- Country: Italy
- Region: Lombardy
- Province: Sondrio (SO)

Government
  - Mayor: Giuseppe Saligari

Area
  - Total: 53.12 km^{2} (20.51 sq mi)
- Elevation: 610 m (2,000 ft)

Population (31 August 2017)
  - Total: 1,625
  - Density: 30.59/km^{2} (79.23/sq mi)
- Demonym: Grosottini
- Time zone: UTC+1 (CET)
  - Summer (DST): UTC+2 (CEST)
- Postal code: 23034
- Dialing code: 0342
- Website: Official website

Grosotto is a comune (municipality) in the Province of Sondrio in the Italian region Lombardy, located about 120 kilometres (75 mi) northeast of Milan and about 35 kilometres (22 mi) northeast of Sondrio, on the border with Switzerland.

Grosotto borders the following municipalities: Brusio (Switzerland), Grosio, Mazzo di Valtellina, Monno, Poschiavo (Switzerland), Vervio.
