= Edolo Pumped Storage Plant =

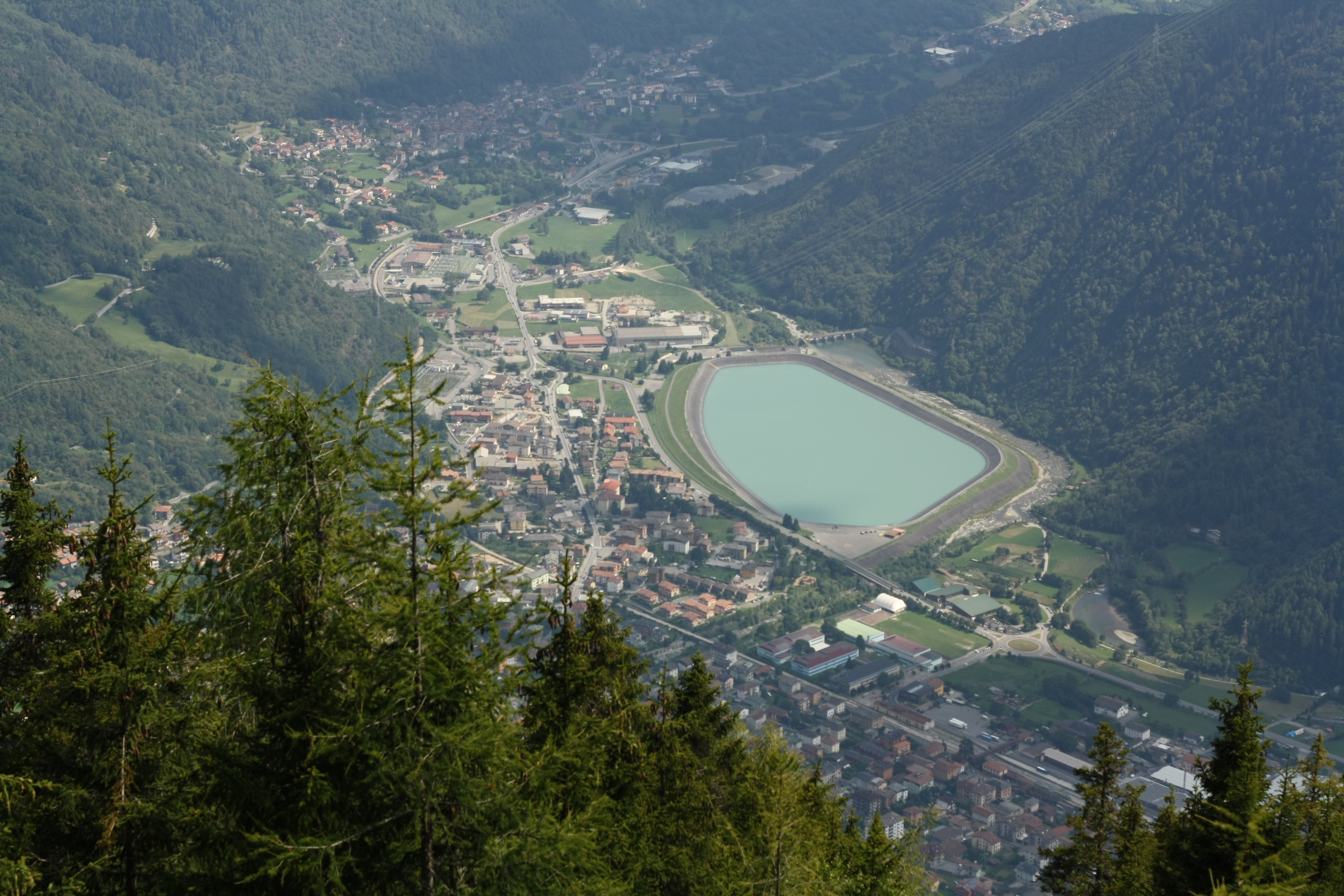
- The lower Edolo reservoir seen in Edolo just left of the Oglio River; power plant near the top-left
- Country: Italy
- Location: Edolo
- Coordinates: 46°10′15″N 10°20′52″E
- Status: Operational
- Opening date: 1984/1985
- Owner(s): ENEL

Upper reservoir
- Creates: Lake Avio/Benedetto
- Total capacity: 21,240,000 m^{3} (17,220 acre⋅ft), 17,040,000 m^{3} (13,815 acre⋅ft) (active)

Lower reservoir
- Creates: Edolo Lower
- Total capacity: 1,400,000 m^{3} (1,135 acre⋅ft), 1,279,000 m^{3} (1,037 acre⋅ft) (active)

Power Station
- Pump-generators: 8 x 125 MW Francis pump-turbines
- Installed capacity: 1,000 MW
- Annual generation: 737 GWh

The Edolo Pumped Storage Plant is located along the Oglio River just downstream of Edolo, Brescia Province in the Lombardy region of Italy. Using the pumped-storage hydroelectric method, it has an installed capacity of 1,000 megawatts (1,300,000 hp). Its generators were commissioned between April 1984 and November 1985. Lake Avio was previously completed in 1929 and Lake Benedetto completed in 1940.

== Design and operation ==
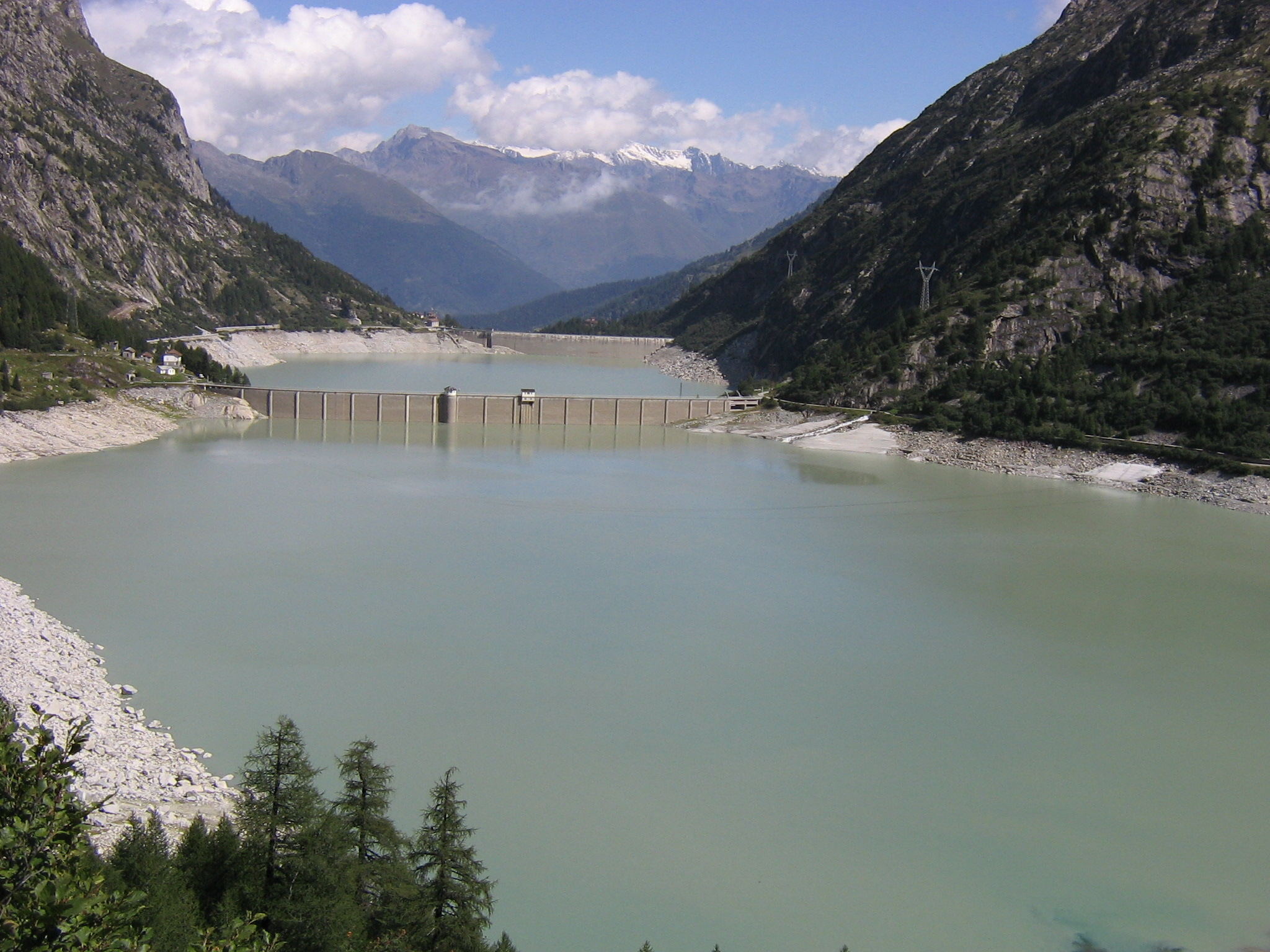
Lake Benedetto in foreground, Lake Avio in background

The lower reservoir is located in Edolo on the north bank of the Oglio. It was created by a circular dike and stores water for pumping. Of the lower reservoir's 14,000,000 m^{3} (11,350 acre⋅ft) storage capacity, 12,790,000 m^{3} (10,369 acre⋅ft) can be used for pumping. It is located at an elevation of 655 m (2,149 ft). The upper reservoir, Lake Avio, is located 10 km (6 mi) east of Edolo high in the mountains at 46°11′37″N 10°28′16″E. Directly above Lake Avio is Lake Benedetto which supplements Avio with water. Both the Avio and Benedetto Dams are gravity dams and are 37.5 m (123 ft) and 31 m (102 ft) in height, respectively. The total storage capacity of the upper reservoir (including Lake Benedetto) is 21,240,000 m^{3} (17,220 acre⋅ft) of which 17,040,000 m^{3} (13,815 acre⋅ft) can be used for power generation. The elevation of Lake Avio is 1,908 m (6,260 ft) above sea level and it traps water from a 49.5 km^{2} (19 sq mi) catchment area. Connecting the upper and lower reservoirs is a series of tunnels and pipes. Beginning at Lake Avio's intake, an 8,125 m (26,657 ft) long head-race tunnel transfers water east before it bifurcates into two 499 m (1,637 ft) long penstocks. Each penstock reaches the power plant and splits further to supply the eight pump-generators with water. The lower reservoir and power plant are connected by two 1,100 m (3,609 ft) long tunnels. The difference in elevation between both reservoirs affords a hydraulic head of 1,265 m (4,150 ft). At the power station, each Francis pump-turbine-generator is rated at 125 MW for power generation and 140 MW for pumping. Only seven of the pump-generators can operate at one time.

When energy demand is low and electricity cheap, the plant pumps water from the lower reservoir to the upper. When demand is high, that water, being stored energy, is released back down the same tunnels and pipes to the plant for generation. After being used for generation, the power plant sends the water back to the lower reservoir. New water reserves can also be taken from the Oglio River. This process repeats as needed and allows the plant to serve as a peaking power plant. The plant generates 737 GWh annually but consumes 1,021 GWh pumping. Although it consumes more energy than it creates, pumping occurs at night, when electricity is cheap. This makes the plant economical, as it generates electricity during high demand, more expensive periods. The size of the Avio Dam's catchment area allows it to collect water naturally as well and 219 GWh can be generated from this water alone annually.

== See also ==
- Hydroelectricity in Italy
- List of pumped-storage hydroelectric power stations
