= Vervio =

- Comune
- Comune di Vervio
- Coat of arms

- Location within Italy Location within Lombardy
- Coordinates: 46°15′N 10°14′E
- Country: Italy
- Region: Lombardy
- Province: Province of Sondrio (SO)

Area
  - Total: 12.6 km^{2} (4.9 sq mi)

Population (Dec. 2004)
  - Total: 230
  - Density: 18/km^{2} (47/sq mi)
- Time zone: UTC+1 (CET)
  - Summer (DST): UTC+2 (CEST)
- Postal code: 23030
- Dialing code: 0342

Vervio (Verv in lombard) is a comune (municipality) in the Province of Sondrio in the Italian region Lombardy, located about 120 kilometres (75 mi) northeast of Milan and about 30 kilometres (19 mi) northeast of Sondrio, on the border with Switzerland. As of 31 December 2004, it had a population of 230 and an area of 12.6 square kilometres (4.9 mi^{2}).

Vervio borders the following municipalities: Brusio (Switzerland), Grosotto, Lovero, Mazzo di Valtellina, Sernio, Tirano, Tovo di Sant'Agata.

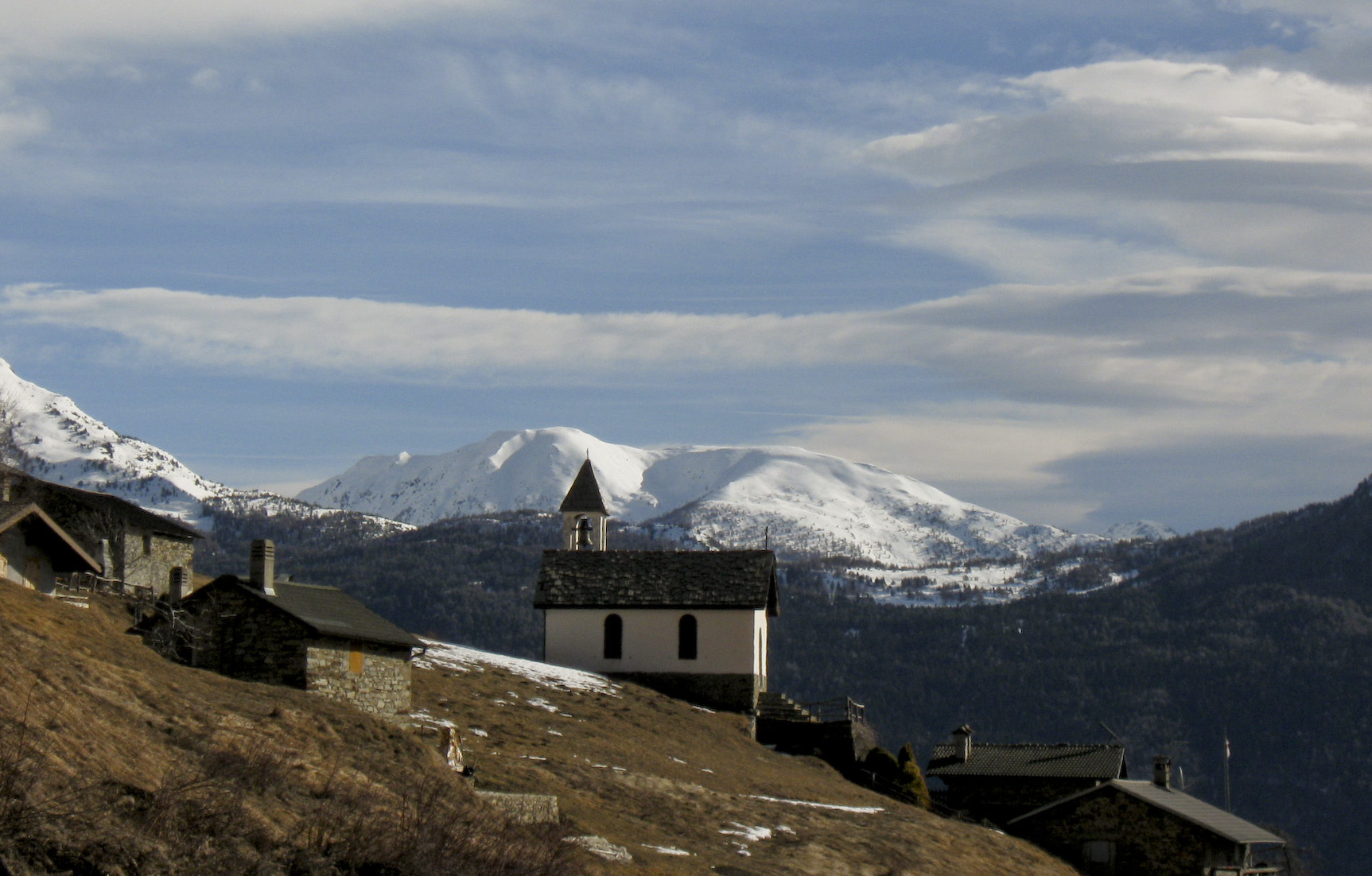
the Church Madonna delle Grazie

== Demographic evolution ==
Historical population

Year	Pop.	±%
1861	808	—
1871	844	+4.5%
1881	950	+12.6%
1901	1,003	+5.6%
1911	931	−7.2%

Year	Pop.	±%
1921	1,009	+8.4%
1931	889	−11.9%
1936	894	+0.6%
1951	841	−5.9%
1961	607	−27.8%

Year	Pop.	±%
1971	427	−29.7%
1981	335	−21.5%
1991	280	−16.4%
2001	239	−14.6%

Source: Data from ISTAT
