= Tovo di Sant'Agata =

- Comune
- Comune di Tovo di Sant'Agata
- Location within Italy Location within Lombardy
- Coordinates: 46°15′N 10°15′E
- Country: Italy
- Region: Lombardy
- Province: Province of Sondrio (SO)

Area
  - Total: 11.0 km^{2} (4.2 sq mi)

Population (Dec. 2004)
  - Total: 577
  - Density: 52.5/km^{2} (136/sq mi)
- Time zone: UTC+1 (CET)
  - Summer (DST): UTC+2 (CEST)
- Postal code: 23030
- Dialing code: 0342

Tovo di Sant'Agata is a comune (municipality) in the Province of Sondrio in the Italian region Lombardy, located about 120 kilometres (75 mi) northeast of Milan and about 30 kilometres (19 mi) northeast of Sondrio. As of 31 December 2004, it had a population of 577 and an area of 11.0 square kilometres (4.2 mi^{2}).

Tovo di Sant'Agata borders the following municipalities: Edolo, Lovero, Mazzo di Valtellina, Monno, Vervio.

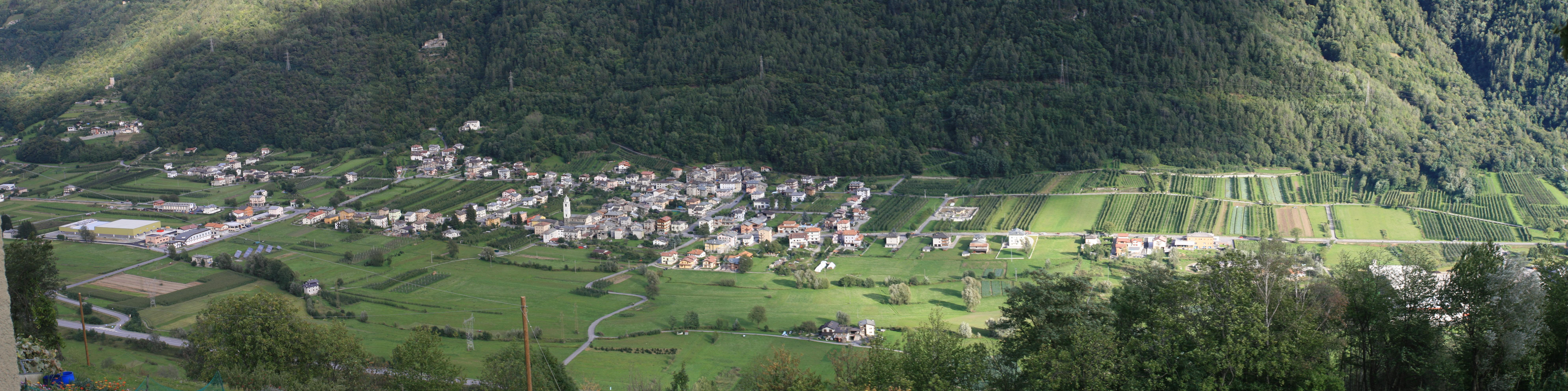
the town

== Demographic evolution ==
Historical population

Year	Pop.	±%
1861	456	—
1871	474	+3.9%
1881	523	+10.3%
1901	470	−10.1%
1911	538	+14.5%

Year	Pop.	±%
1921	506	−5.9%
1931	441	−12.8%
1936	476	+7.9%
1951	397	−16.6%
1961	403	+1.5%

Year	Pop.	±%
1971	456	+13.2%
1981	496	+8.8%
1991	522	+5.2%
2001	569	+9.0%

Source: Data from ISTAT
