= Valfurva =

Valfurva Valforba (Lombard)
- Comune
- Comune di Valfurva
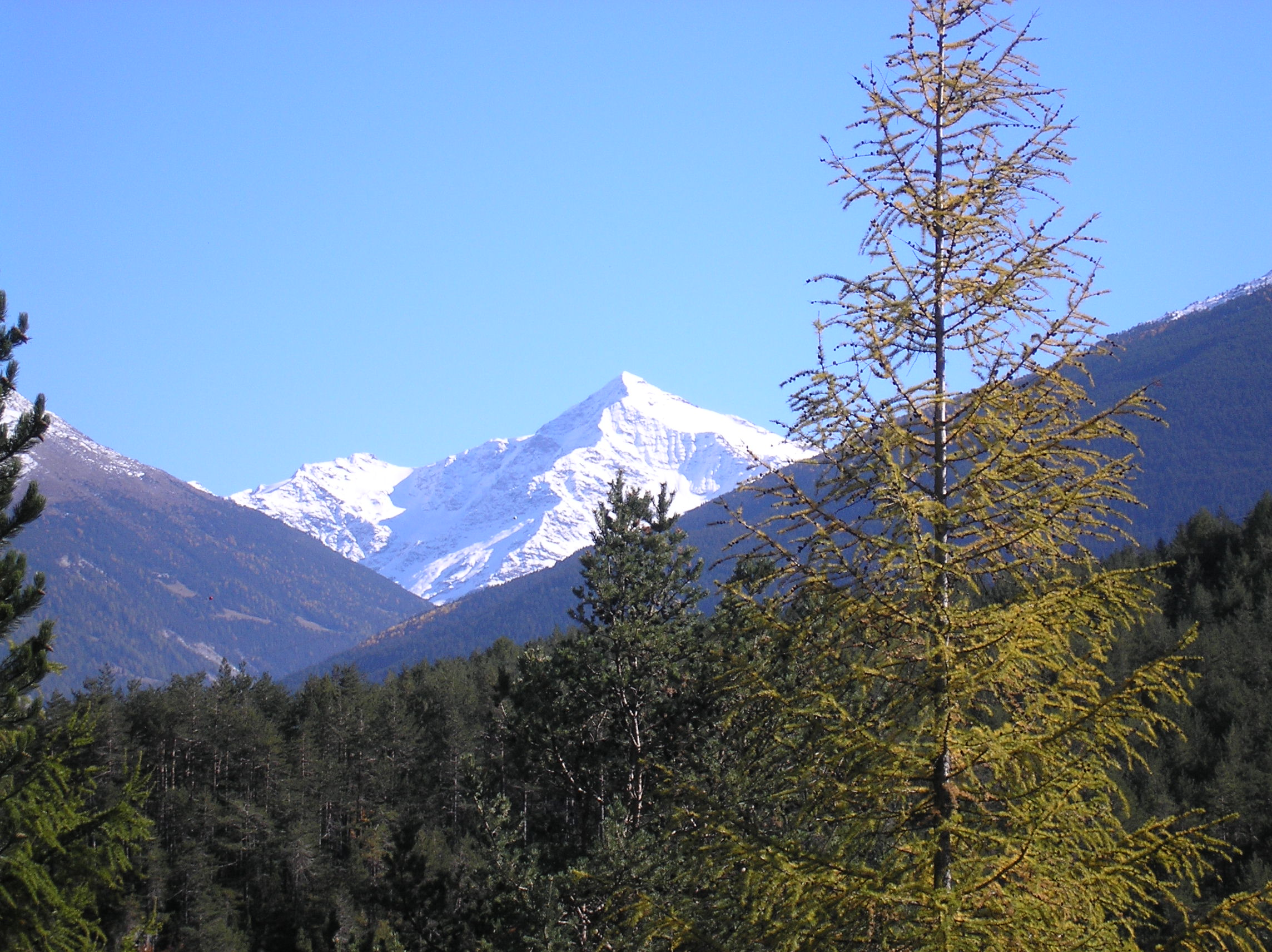
- The Tresero in October 2005.

- Location within Italy Location within Lombardy
- Coordinates: 46°27′N 10°25′E
- Country: Italy
- Region: Lombardy
- Province: Province of Sondrio (SO)
- Frazioni: Uzza, San Nicolò, Sant'Antonio, San Gottardo, Madonna dei Monti, Santa Caterina

Government
  - Mayor: Angelo Cacciotto

Area
  - Total: 215.9 km^{2} (83.4 sq mi)
- Elevation: 1,800 m (5,900 ft)

Population (Dec. 2004)
  - Total: 2,725
  - Density: 12.62/km^{2} (32.69/sq mi)
- Time zone: UTC+1 (CET)
  - Summer (DST): UTC+2 (CEST)
- Postal code: 23030
- Dialing code: 0342

Valfurva (Lombard: Valforba) is a comune (municipality) in the Province of Sondrio in the Italian region of Lombardy, located about 150 kilometres (93 mi) northeast of Milan and about 50 kilometres (31 mi) northeast of Sondrio, in the Alps. As of 31 December 2004, it had a population of 2,725 and an area of 215.9 square kilometres (83.4 mi^{2}).

The municipality of Valfurva contains the frazioni (subdivisions, mainly villages and hamlets) Uzza, San Nicolò, Sant'Antonio, San Gottardo, Madonna dei Monti, and Santa Caterina.

Valfurva borders the following municipalities: Bormio, Martell, Peio, Ponte di Legno, Sondalo, Stilfs, Valdisotto.

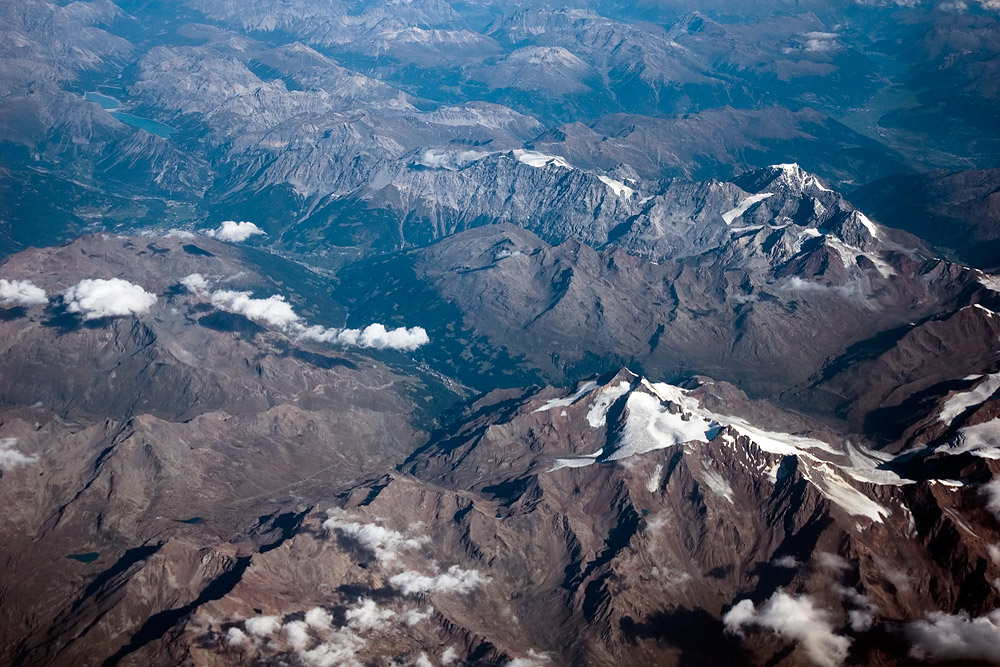
View of Bormio and Valfurva at 10,000m

== Demographic evolution ==
Historical population

Year	Pop.	±%
1861	1,470	—
1871	1,537	+4.6%
1881	1,580	+2.8%
1901	1,578	−0.1%
1911	1,742	+10.4%

Year	Pop.	±%
1921	1,860	+6.8%
1931	1,944	+4.5%
1936	2,006	+3.2%
1951	2,128	+6.1%
1961	2,343	+10.1%

Year	Pop.	±%
1971	2,548	+8.7%
1981	2,768	+8.6%
1991	2,777	+0.3%
2001	2,742	−1.3%

Source: Data from ISTAT
