= Vione =

Vione Viù (Lombard)
- Comune
- Comune di Vione
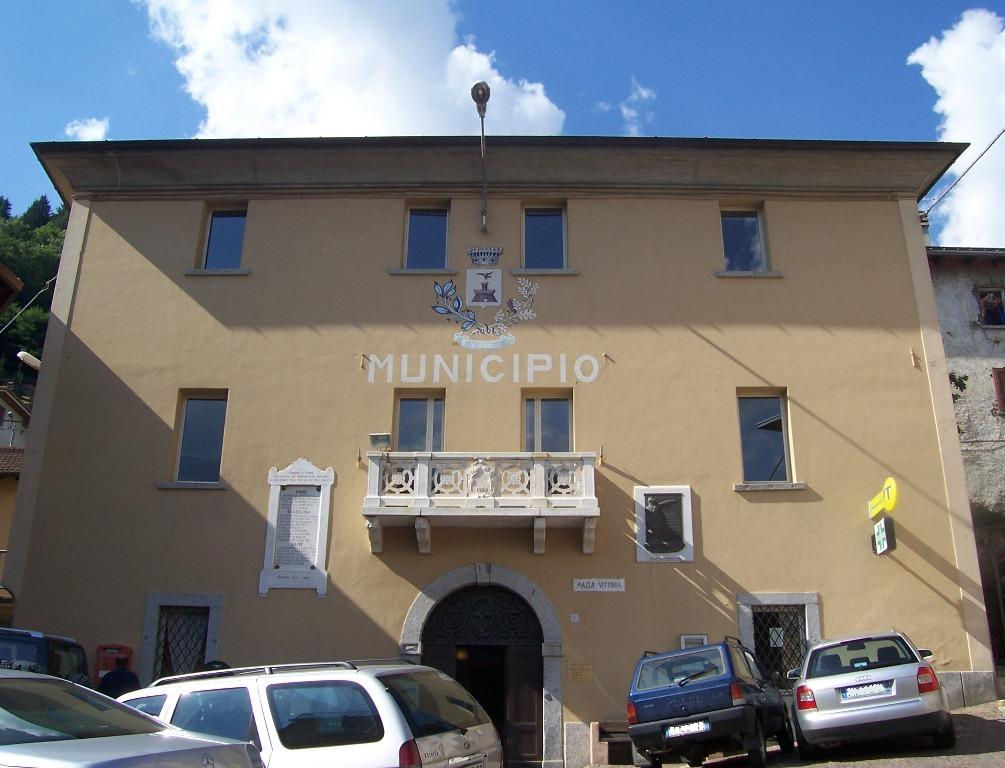
- Town hall

- Location within Italy Location within Lombardy
- Coordinates: 46°14′57″N 10°26′53″E
- Country: Italy
- Region: Lombardy
- Province: Brescia (BS)
- Frazioni: Canè, Stadolina

Area
  - Total: 36.6 km^{2} (14.1 sq mi)
- Elevation: 1,250 m (4,100 ft)

Population (2011)
  - Total: 723
  - Density: 19.8/km^{2} (51.2/sq mi)
- Demonym: vionesi
- Time zone: UTC+1 (CET)
  - Summer (DST): UTC+2 (CEST)
- Postal code: 25050
- Dialing code: 0364
- Patron saint: San Remigio
- Saint day: 24 August
- Website: Official website

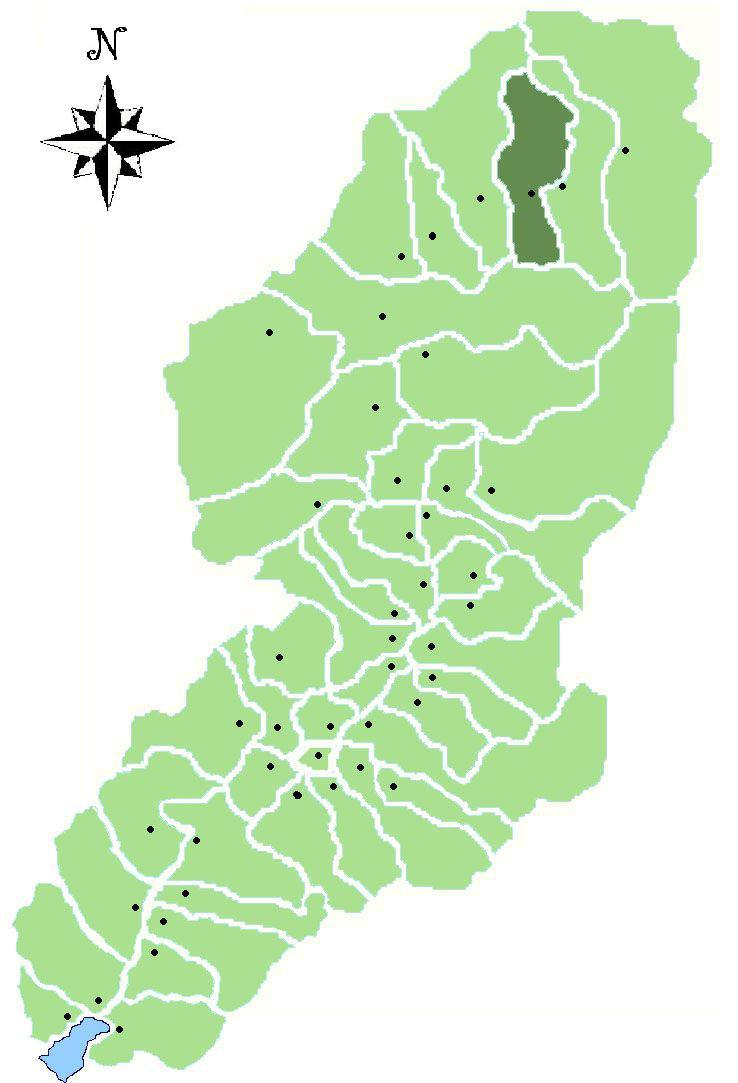
Location of Vione in Val Camonica

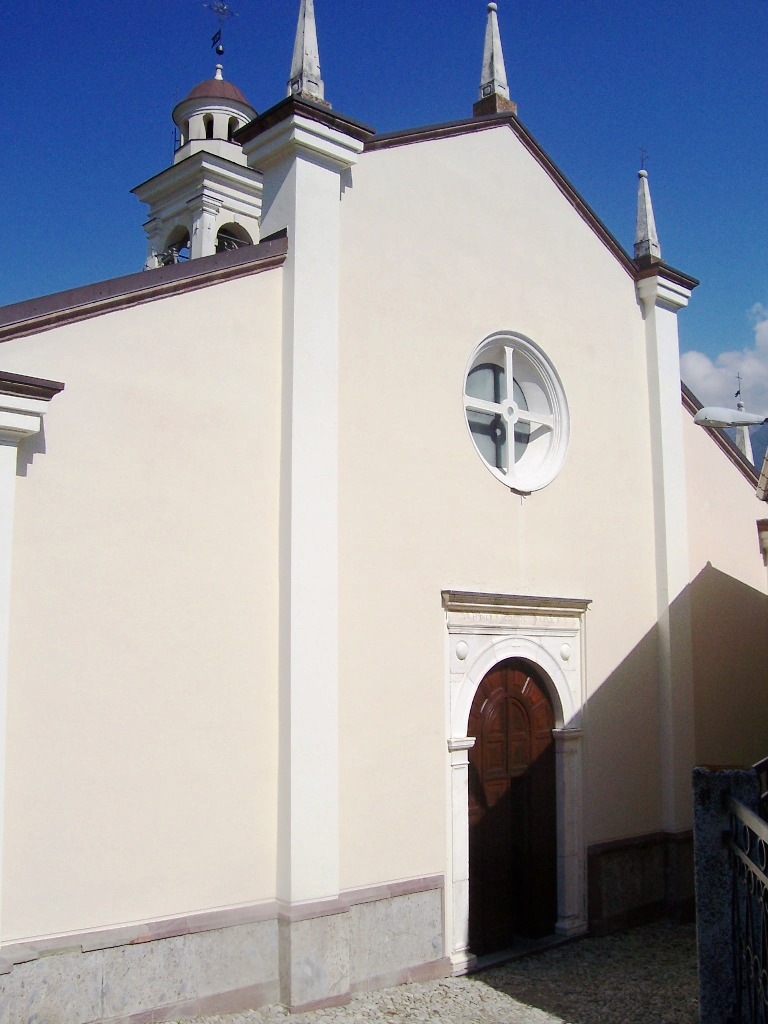
Parish church

Vione (Camunian: Viù) is a comune in the province of Brescia, in Lombardy. It is situated above the right bank of the river Oglio, in upper Val Camonica. Neighbouring communes are Edolo, Ponte di Legno, Temù and Vezza d'Oglio. Its coat of arms shows a castle with an eagle over it.
