= Valdisotto =

Valdisotto Val de Sota (Lombard)
- Comune
- Comune di Valdisotto
- Coat of arms

- Location within Italy Location within Lombardy
- Coordinates: 46°25′N 10°21′E
- Country: Italy
- Region: Lombardy
- Province: Sondrio (SO)
- Frazioni: Aquilone, Capitania, Cepina, Oga, Piatta, Piazza, San Pietro, Santa Lucia, Santa Maria, Sant'Antonio Morignone, Tola

Government
  - Mayor: Alessandro Pedrini

Area
  - Total: 88.4 km^{2} (34.1 sq mi)

Population (Dec. 2004)
  - Total: 3,363
  - Density: 38.0/km^{2} (98.5/sq mi)
- Time zone: UTC+1 (CET)
  - Summer (DST): UTC+2 (CEST)
- Postal code: 23030
- Dialing code: 0342
- Website: Official website

Valdisotto (Lombard: Val de Sota) is a comune (municipality) in the Province of Sondrio in the Italian region of Lombardy, located about 140 kilometres (87 mi) northeast of Milan and about 45 kilometres (28 mi) northeast of Sondrio.

Valdisotto borders the following municipalities: Bormio, Grosio, Sondalo, Valdidentro, Valfurva.

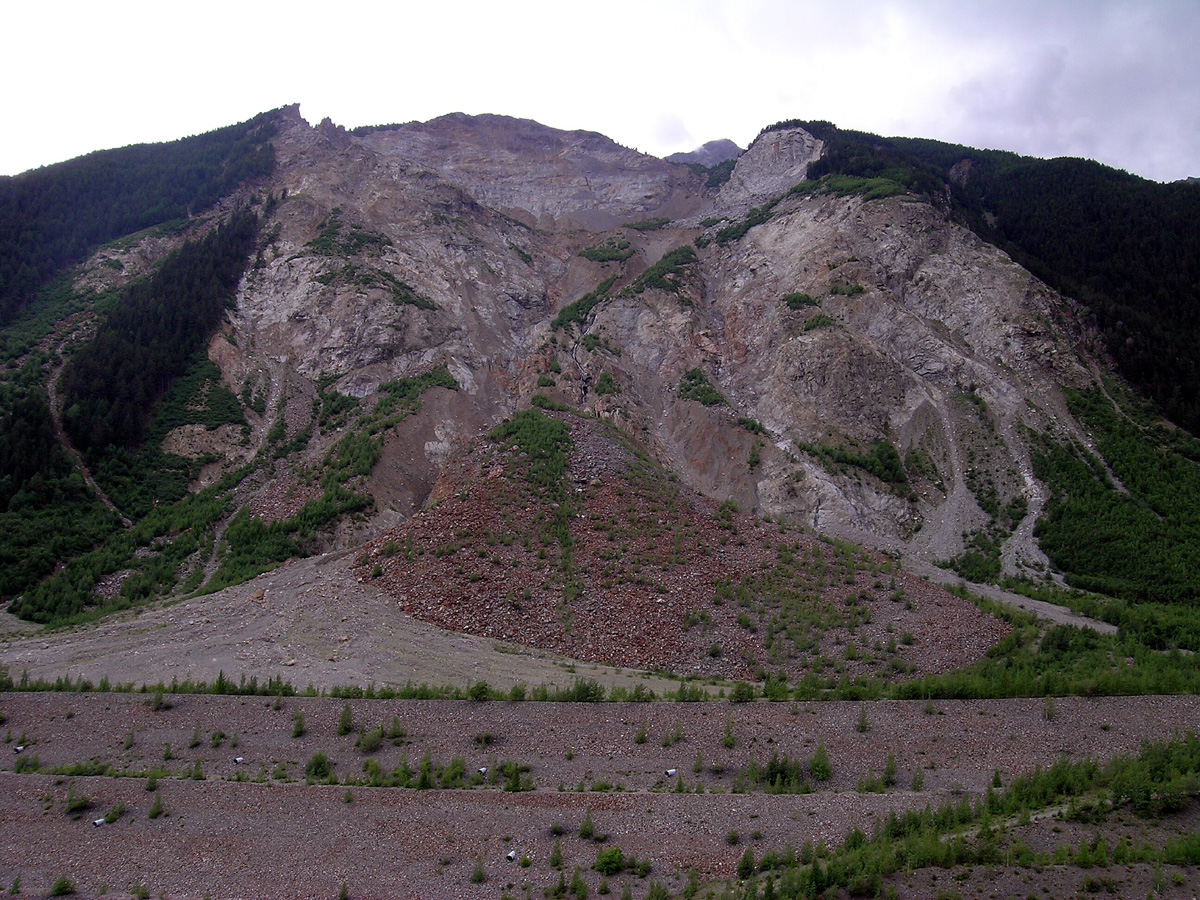
The landslide on 28 July 1987 from Mount Zandila
