= Grosio =

Grosio Gros (Lombard)
- Comune
- Comune di Grosio
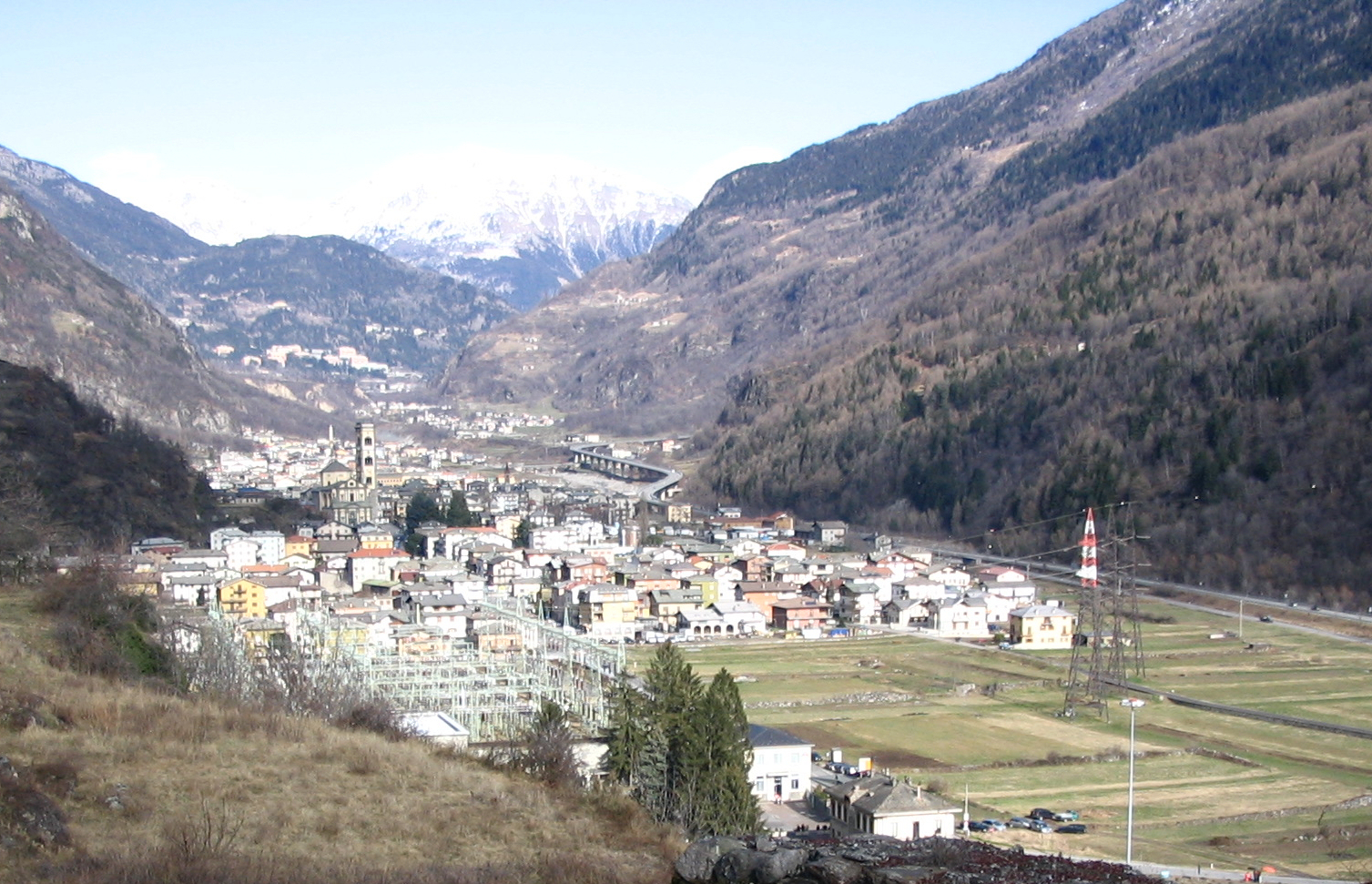

- Coat of arms

- Location within Italy Location within Lombardy
- Coordinates: 46°18′N 10°17′E
- Country: Italy
- Region: Lombardy
- Province: Province of Sondrio (SO)
- Frazioni: Tiolo, Ravoledo

Government
  - Mayor: Antonio Pruneri

Area
  - Total: 127.0 km^{2} (49.0 sq mi)
- Elevation: 656 m (2,152 ft)

Population (31 August 2017)
  - Total: 4,431
  - Density: 34.89/km^{2} (90.36/sq mi)
- Demonym: Grosini
- Time zone: UTC+1 (CET)
  - Summer (DST): UTC+2 (CEST)
- Postal code: 23033
- Dialing code: 0342
- Website: Official website

Grosio (Italian pronunciation: [ˈɡrɔːzjo]; Lombard: Gros) is a comune (municipality) in the Province of Sondrio in the Italian region of Lombardy, located about 130 kilometres (81 mi) northeast of Milan and about 35 kilometres (22 mi) northeast of Sondrio, on the border with Switzerland.

The municipality of Grosio contains the frazioni (subdivisions, mainly villages and hamlets) Tiolo, Vernuga and Ravoledo.

Grosio borders the following municipalities: Grosotto, Monno, Poschiavo (Switzerland), Sondalo, Valdidentro, Valdisotto, Vezza d'Oglio.

== Main sights ==
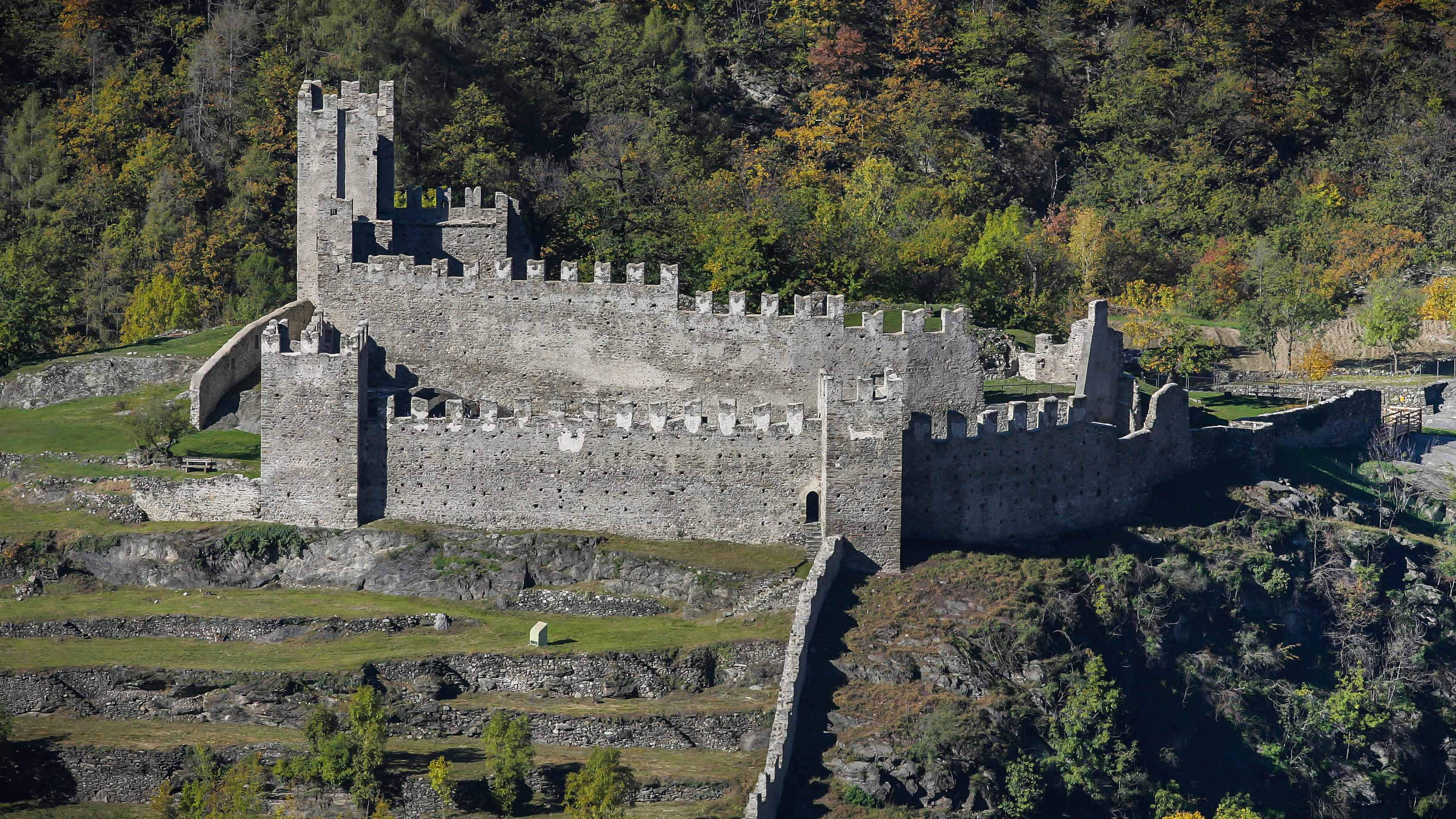
Castello Nuovo

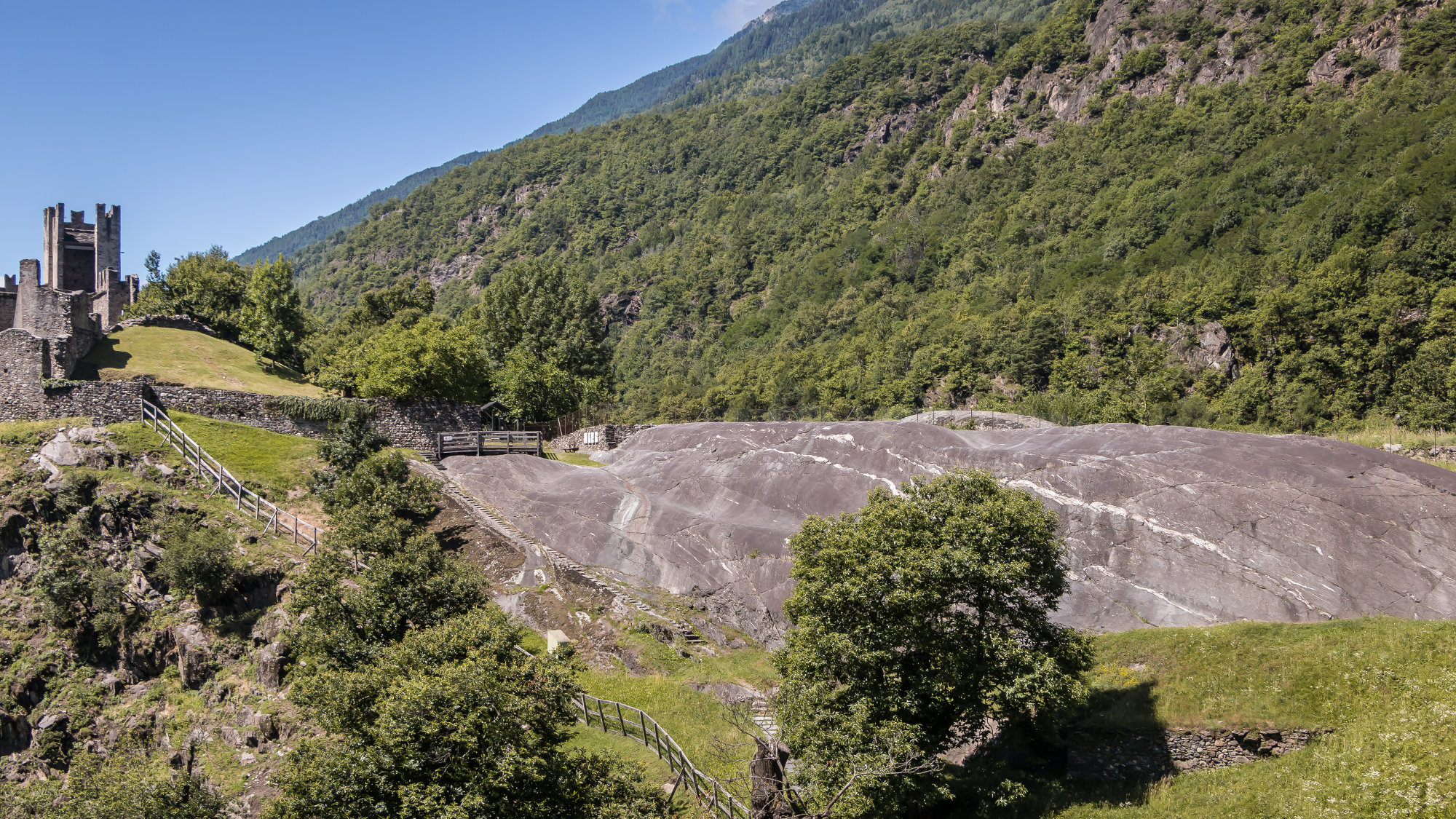
The Rupe Magna

- Rock Engraving Park of Grosio. It houses the Rupe Magna, a large rock which has more than 5.000 engraved figures from the 4th to the 1st millennium BC With a length of 84 m and a width of 35 m, it is one of the largest engraved rocks in the Alpine range. Various themes like human figures, including “orants” or armed men, animals, geometrical shapes and cup-marks are incised on its surface.
- Two castle ruins, at the "Dosso dei Castelli" (Castle Hill). The Castello Nuovo was built in the 14th century by the family of Visconti. The Castello Vecchio (o San Faustino) was constructed in the 11th century by the Bishops of Como.
- In the historic center of Grosio is the church of San Giorgio (16th century). The single-nave church contains frescoes painted by Cipriano Valorsa, the so-called Raphael of Valtellina.
- Parish church of San Giuseppe (17th century)
- Villa Visconti-Venosta, the historic summer residence of the family Visconti-Venosta from about 1600 to 1982. When the marchioness Margherita Pallavicino Mossi, widow of Giovanni Visconti-Venosta died, she donated the villa to the comune of Grosio. Nowadays the library of the comune is situated in the basement areas. Since 2017 it is open again as a museum.

== Twin towns ==
Grosio is twinned town with:

- Lastra a Signa, Italy, since 1989
