= Monno =

Monno Mòn
- Comune
- Comune di Monno
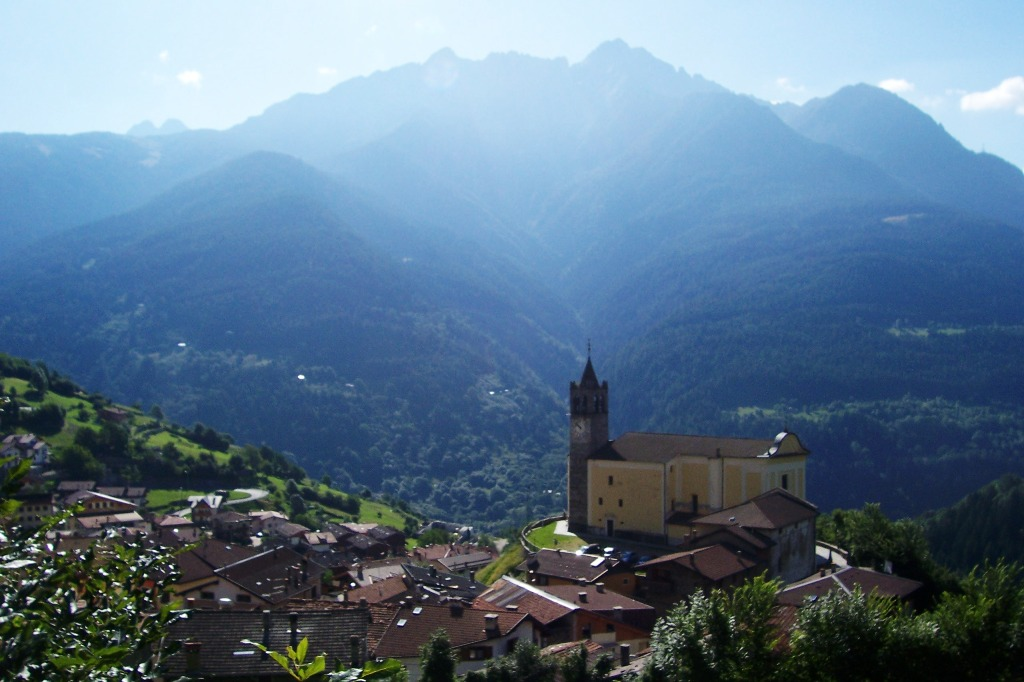
- Monno

- Location within Italy Location within Lombardy
- Coordinates: 46°12′48″N 10°20′26″E
- Country: Italy
- Region: Lombardy
- Province: Brescia (BS)

Area
  - Total: 30.70 km^{2} (11.85 sq mi)
- Elevation: 1,066 m (3,497 ft)

Population (2011)
  - Total: 563
  - Density: 18.3/km^{2} (47.5/sq mi)
- Demonym: Monnesi
- Time zone: UTC+1 (CET)
  - Summer (DST): UTC+2 (CEST)
- Postal code: 25040
- Dialing code: 0364
- Patron saint: San Pietro e San Paolo
- Saint day: 29 giugno
- Website: Official website

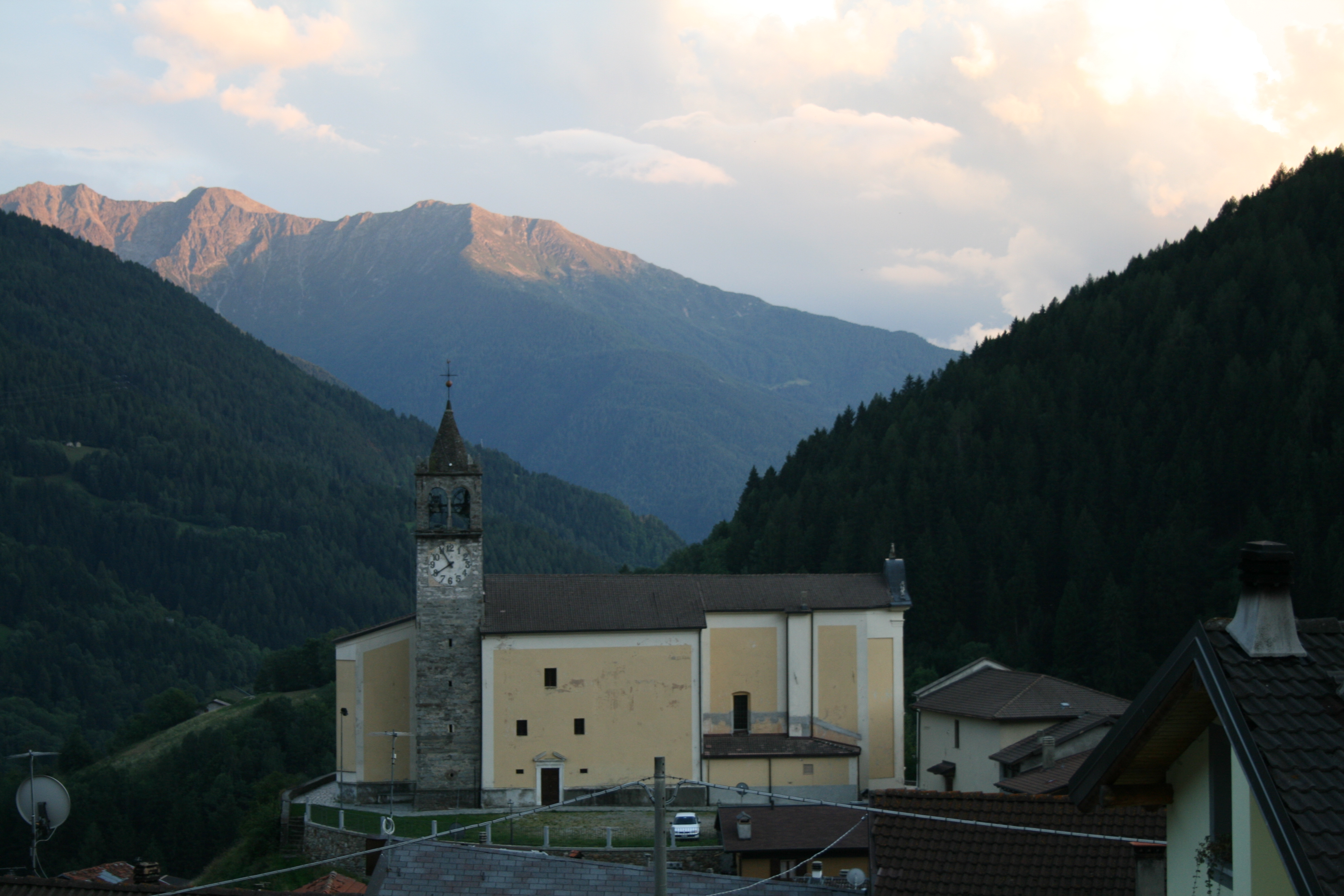
San Pietro e Paolo Church

Monno (Camunian: Mòn) is a village and comune in the province of Brescia, in Lombardy. It is situated above the right bank of the river Oglio, in upper Val Camonica.

== Geography ==
=== Location ===
Monno is located along the road which from Val Camonica goes to Mortirolo Pass.

== Monuments and attractions ==
=== Religious architecture ===
The churches of Monno are:

- San Pietro e Paolo Church, built on the ruins of a 14th-century building. The gate, which dates back to 1629, is made of marble of Vezza. In 1895, Antonio Guadanini painted on the apse the Annunciation with the Evangelists in the hackle.
- San Francesco Oratory – its structure dates back to the 16th century; it was designated as a cinema.
- San Sebastiano e Fabiano Church, built on an older building.
- San Brizio Church

=== Military architecture ===
- Castello di Monno, owned by the Federici family and then the Corata family which disappeared without heirs in 1733. There are no traces, except for the base of San Pietro e Paolo Church.
- WWII cannon on the peak of Monte Pagano.

=== Places of natural interest ===
- Conca of Mortirolo Pass.

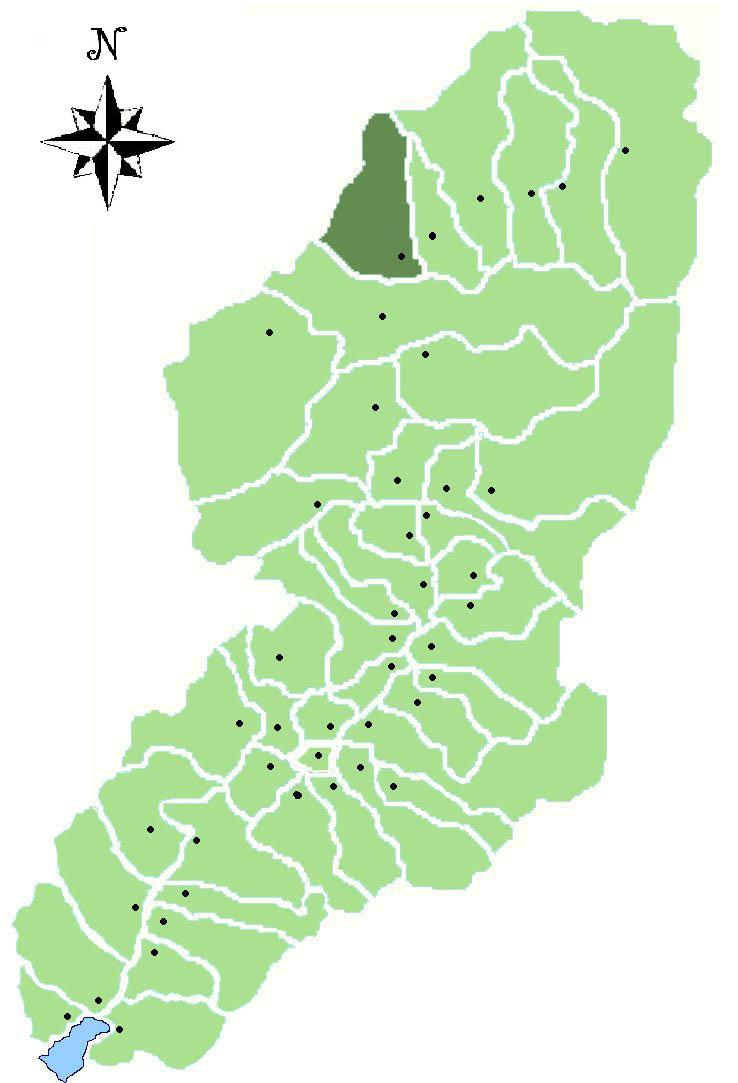
Location of Monno in Val Camonica
