= Sernio =

- Comune
- Comune di Sernio
- Coat of arms

- Location within Italy Location within Lombardy
- Coordinates: 46°13′N 10°12′E
- Country: Italy
- Region: Lombardy
- Province: Sondrio (SO)

Government
  - Mayor: Piero Patroni

Area
  - Total: 9.6 km^{2} (3.7 sq mi)
- Elevation: 632 m (2,073 ft)

Population (Dec. 2004)
  - Total: 470
  - Density: 49/km^{2} (130/sq mi)
- Time zone: UTC+1 (CET)
  - Summer (DST): UTC+2 (CEST)
- Postal code: 23030
- Dialing code: 0342

Sernio is a comune (municipality) in the Province of Sondrio in the Italian region Lombardy, located about 120 kilometres (75 mi) northeast of Milan and about 25 kilometres (16 mi) east of Sondrio.
