= San Giovanni Battista, Morbegno =

Church in Lombardy, Italy

Coordinates: 46°07′57.6″N 9°34′11.6″E

Chiesa di San Giovanni Battista
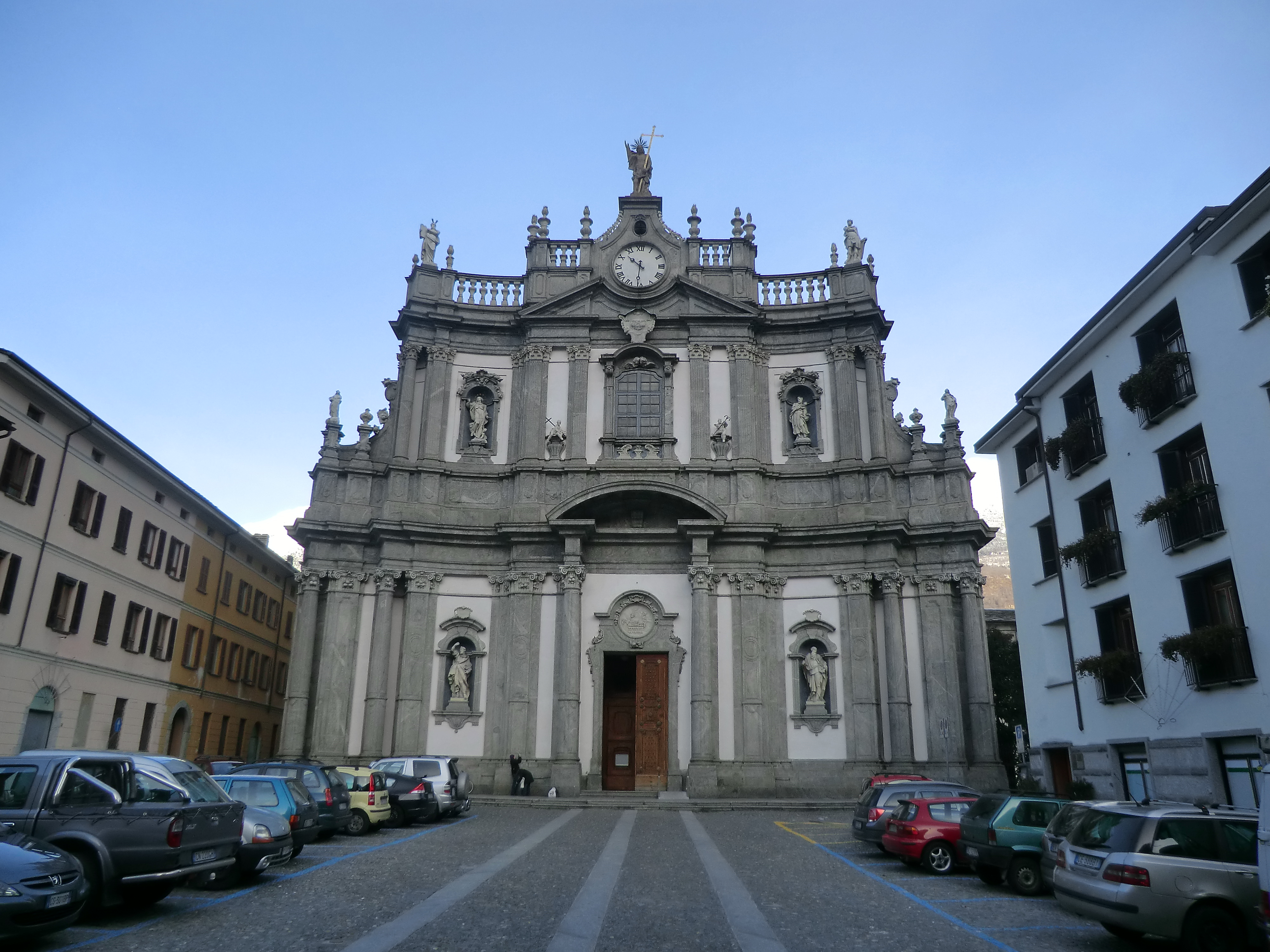
- Chiesa di San Giovanni Battista
- Location: Lombardy
- Country: Italy

History
- Dedication: St. John Baptist
- Consecrated: 1714

The Chiesa di San Giovanni Battista (Church of San Giovanni Battista) is a Roman Catholic collegiate church dating back to the 17th and 18th centuries, located in Morbegno in the Valtellina in region of Lombardy, and consecrated to St. John the Baptist.

== History ==
The facade has an elaborate Baroque style. The church houses a number of paintings, including:

- Madonna and Child and St Filippo Neri by the Venetian Giovanni Battista Pittoni
- 36 oval paintings, some by Giuseppe Antonio Petrini of Carona
- Death of St Joseph by the Milanese Andrea Lanzani
- many works by the Valtelline artists Pietro Legari and Cesare Ligari

In 1993, the church experienced a theft of 37 paintings. Among the sculptures are the statues of the facade of Stefano Salterio and the angels ringing on the sides of the altar major work of Elia Vincenzo Buzzi active also in the Duomo of Milan. The church is also home to the statue of the newly discovered Virgin of Giovanni Angelo Del Maino: the sculpture was part of a filing commissioned by Del Maria by Maria Maria Rusca in 1518 and later lost.

The parish hall since 1560, has a relic of the Holy Spine (of the crown of Christ) and the remains of Blessed Andrea Grego da Peschiera.

The Collegiate also holds important relics: The Holy Spina, donated by the Morgid bishop Feliciano Ninguarda, the earthly remains of Blessed Andrea da Peschiera known as the apostle of Valtellina and the body of Santa Costanza. During the Holy Week, particular traditions are perpetuated by grace even in the presence of two historic confraternities (the Blessed Sacrament and the Assumption of the Battuti), which erect a large baroque wooden chapel on the center of the large hall on which to lay the deposed urn of Christ.

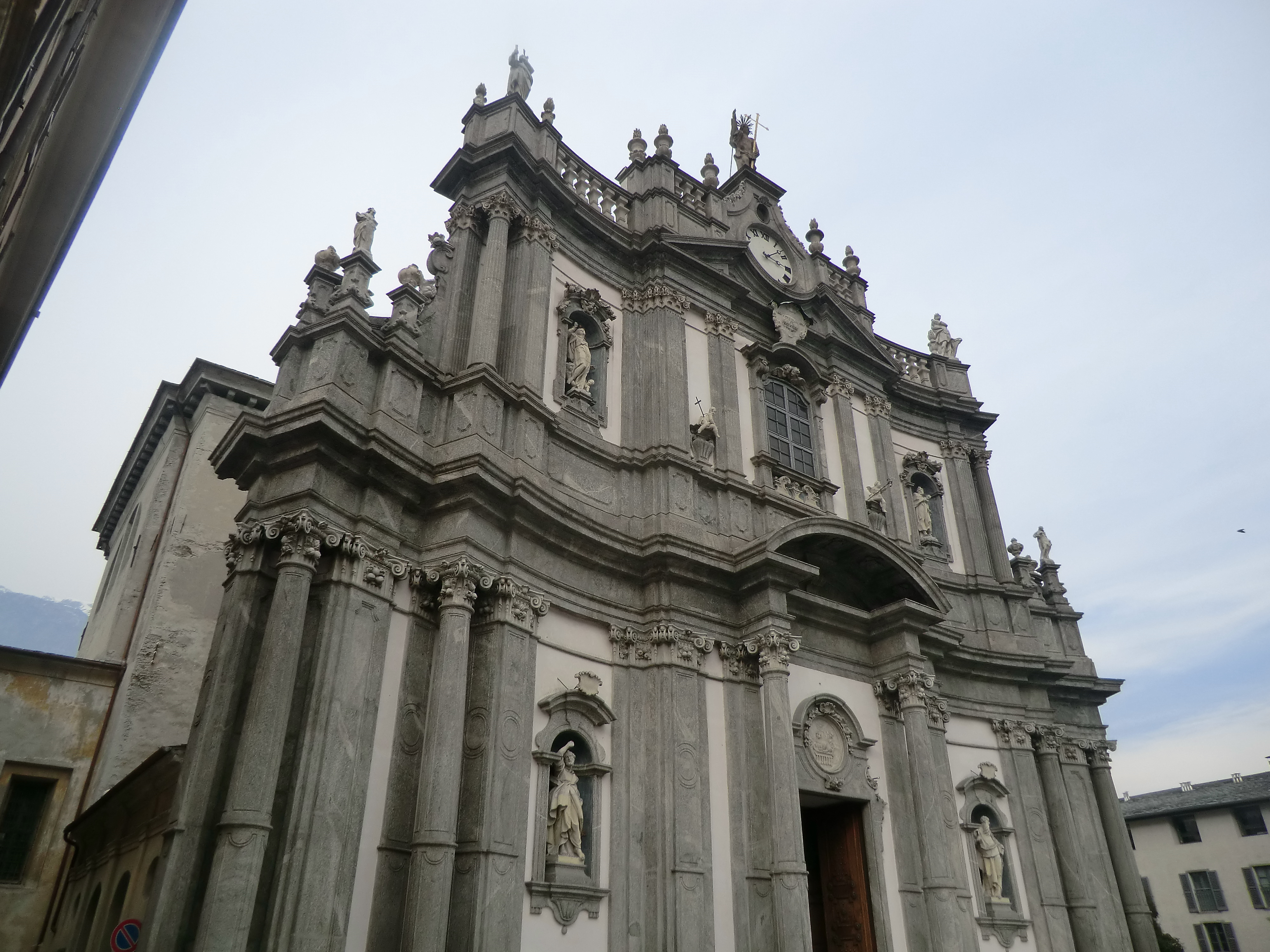
The sailing facade

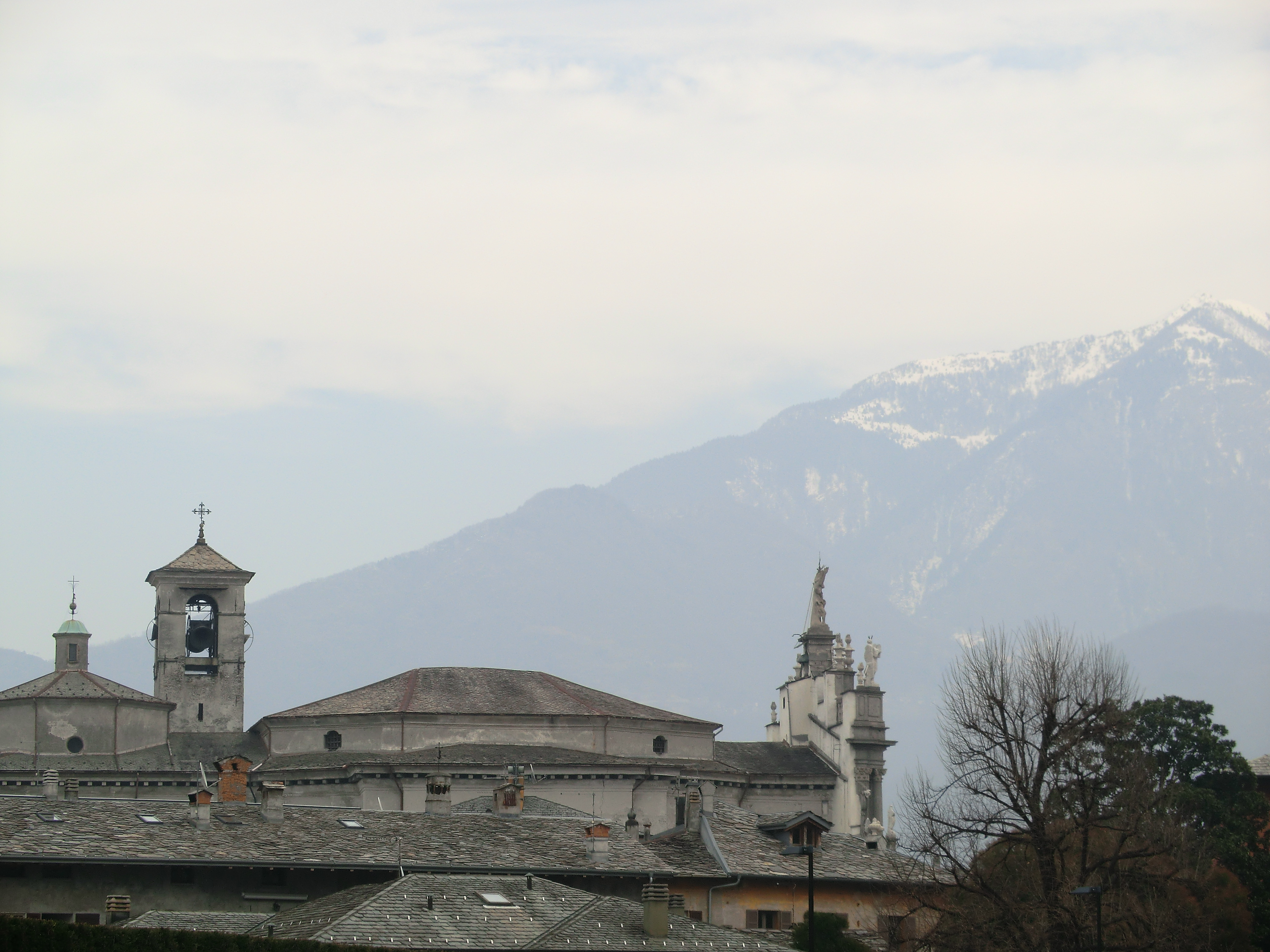
San Giovanni seen from the torrent Bitto

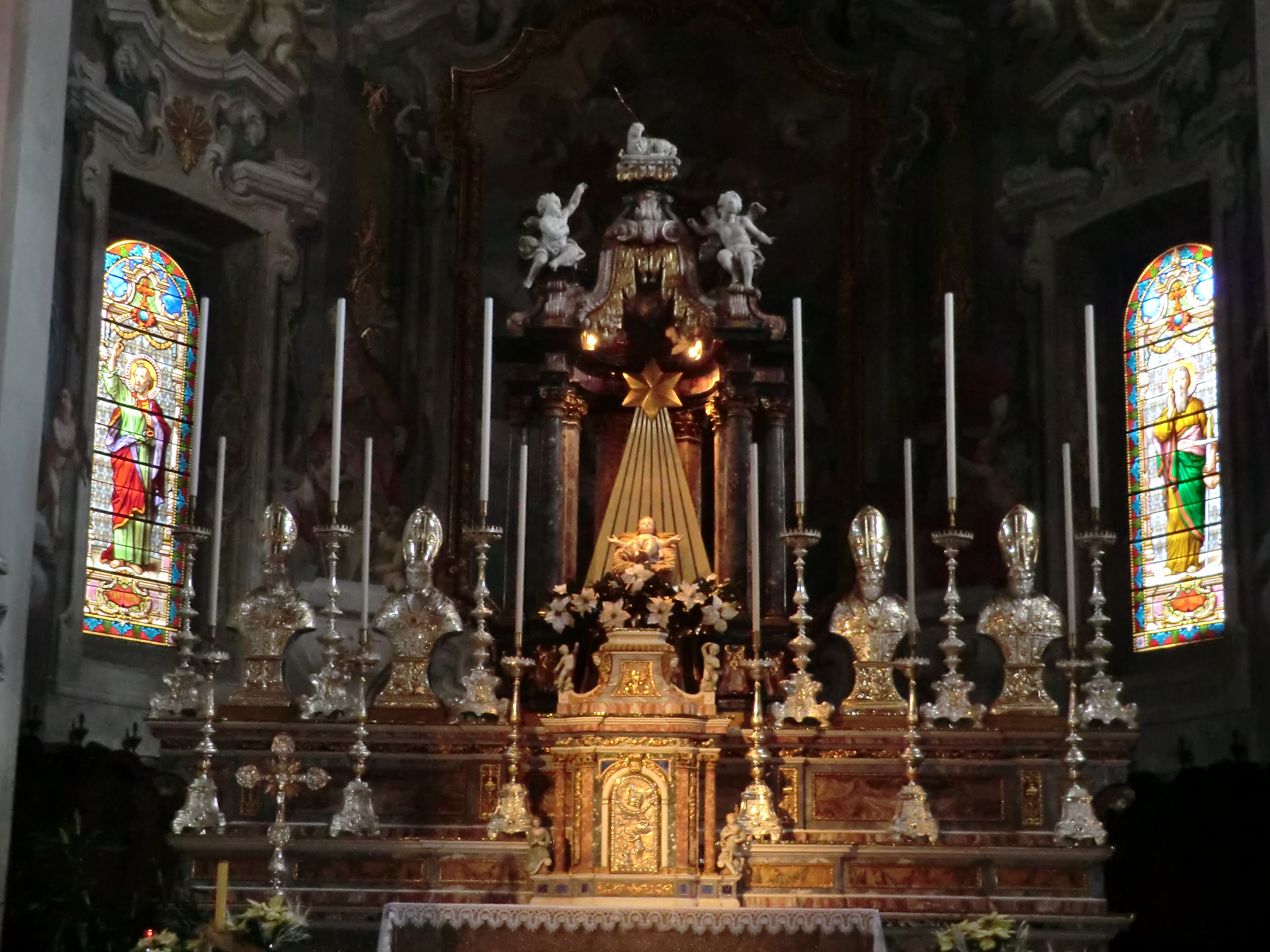
The main altar at Christmas

Archbishop Giovanni Battista Castelli of Sannazzaro decided that a larger temple was to be built to satisfy the new needs, and the canonists Luigi Castelli of Sannazzaro, Cesare Parravicini and Giocondo Parravicini purchased the lands north of the first church of San Giovanni. In that land, which cost 5,013 lire imperial.
