= Hans Ardüser =

Hans Ardüser may refer to:

- Hans Ardüser (politician) (1521–1580), politician, Landammann of Davos
- Hans Ardüser (painter) (1557 – after 1614), painter and chronicler
