= Peter Guler =

Grisons politician (1534–1609)

- Born: 1534
- Died: 6 March 1609 (aged 74–75); Davos, Three Leagues
- Occupation: Politician
- Spouse: Barbara Sprecher von Bernegg

Peter Guler (1534 – 6 March 1609) was a politician from Davos. Between 1568 and 1588 he was Landammann (chief magistrate) of Davos and of the League of the Ten Jurisdictions for several terms, and in 1569 he was vicari (judge) in the Valtellina.

== Biography ==
Peter Guler was a member of the Guler von Wyneck family. He was the son of Hans Guler and Barbara Thöny, and a half-brother of Johannes. He married Barbara Sprecher von Bernegg. In 1550 he and his brother Hans received a new grant of the title of nobility from Archduke Ferdinand of Austria.

He was treasurer (Seckelmeister) and judge of the marriage court (Eherichter) in Davos, and in 1561 podestà in Traona. In 1568, 1571, 1575–1578 and 1585–1588 he was Landammann of Davos, and thus Landammann of the League of the Ten Jurisdictions (Bundslandammann). In 1568 he was one of the envoys to Cardinal Charles Borromeo, and in 1569 he was vicari in the Valtellina. Peter Guler and his wife died as a result of an avalanche that destroyed their house.

== Bibliography ==
- A. Mooser, "Die Guler von Wyneck", in Bündnerisches Monatsblatt, 1934, 129, 161
