= Ligario =

Ligario is a surname. Notable people with the surname include:

- Cesare Ligario (1716–after 1755), Italian painter
- Giovanni Pietro Ligario (1686–1748), Italian painter and architect
- Quintus Ligarius (fl. 1st century BC), Roman general
