= Corno Campascio =

Mountain in Switzerland

- Corno delle Ruzze
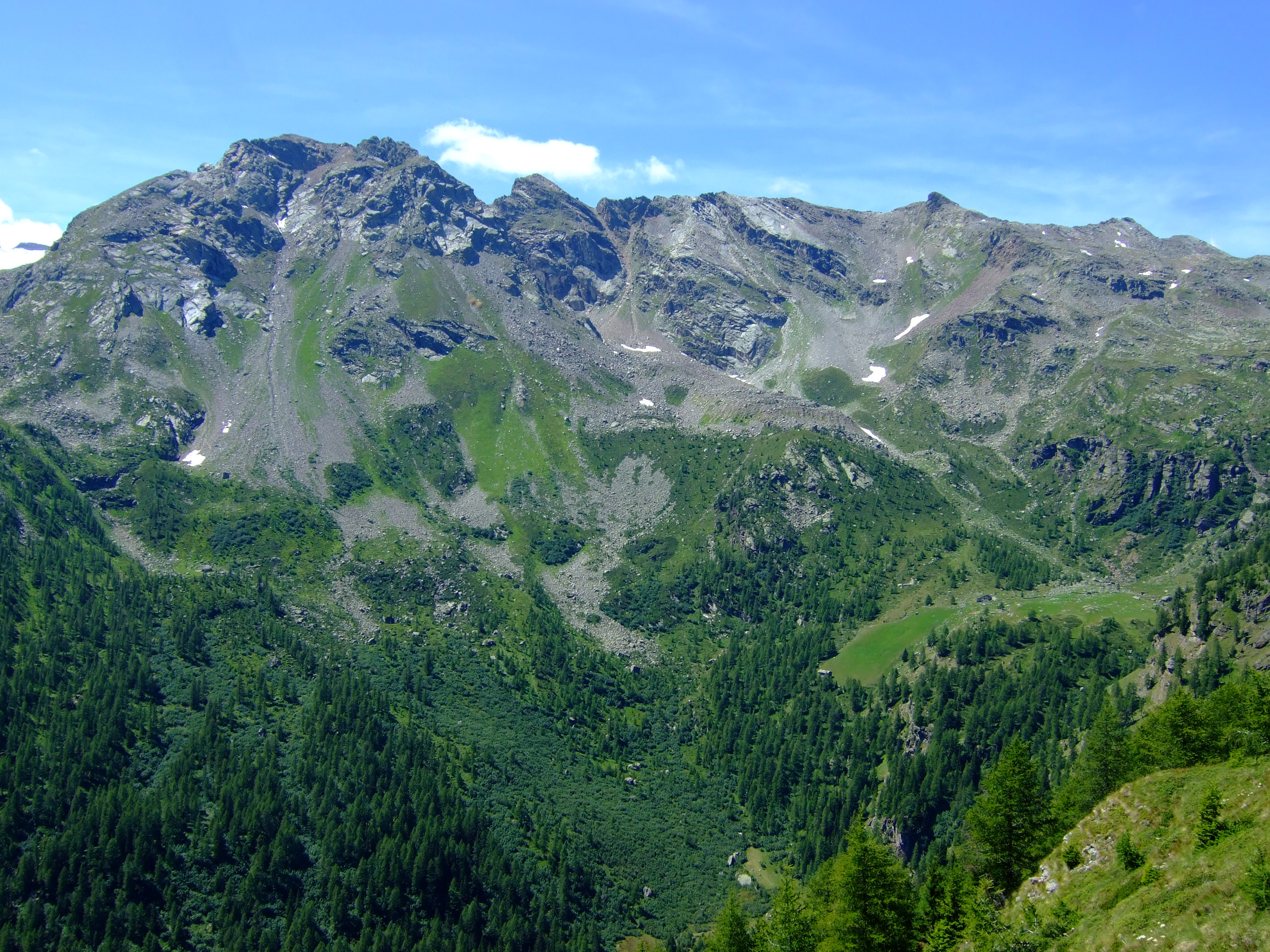
- The Corno Campascio from the north-east

Highest point
- Elevation: 2,808 m (9,213 ft)
- Prominence: 108 m (354 ft)
- Parent peak: Piz Canfinal
- Coordinates: 46°18′47″N 10°00′00″E

Geography
- Location within Alps
- Location: Graubünden, Switzerland / Lombardy, Italy
- Parent range: Bernina Range

The Corno Campascio (also known as Corno delle Ruzze) is a mountain of the Bernina Range (Alps), located on the border between Italy and Switzerland. It lies between the Val Malenco and the Val Poschiavo. The closest locality is Poschiavo on the east side.
