= Dazio =

- Comune
- Comune di Dazio
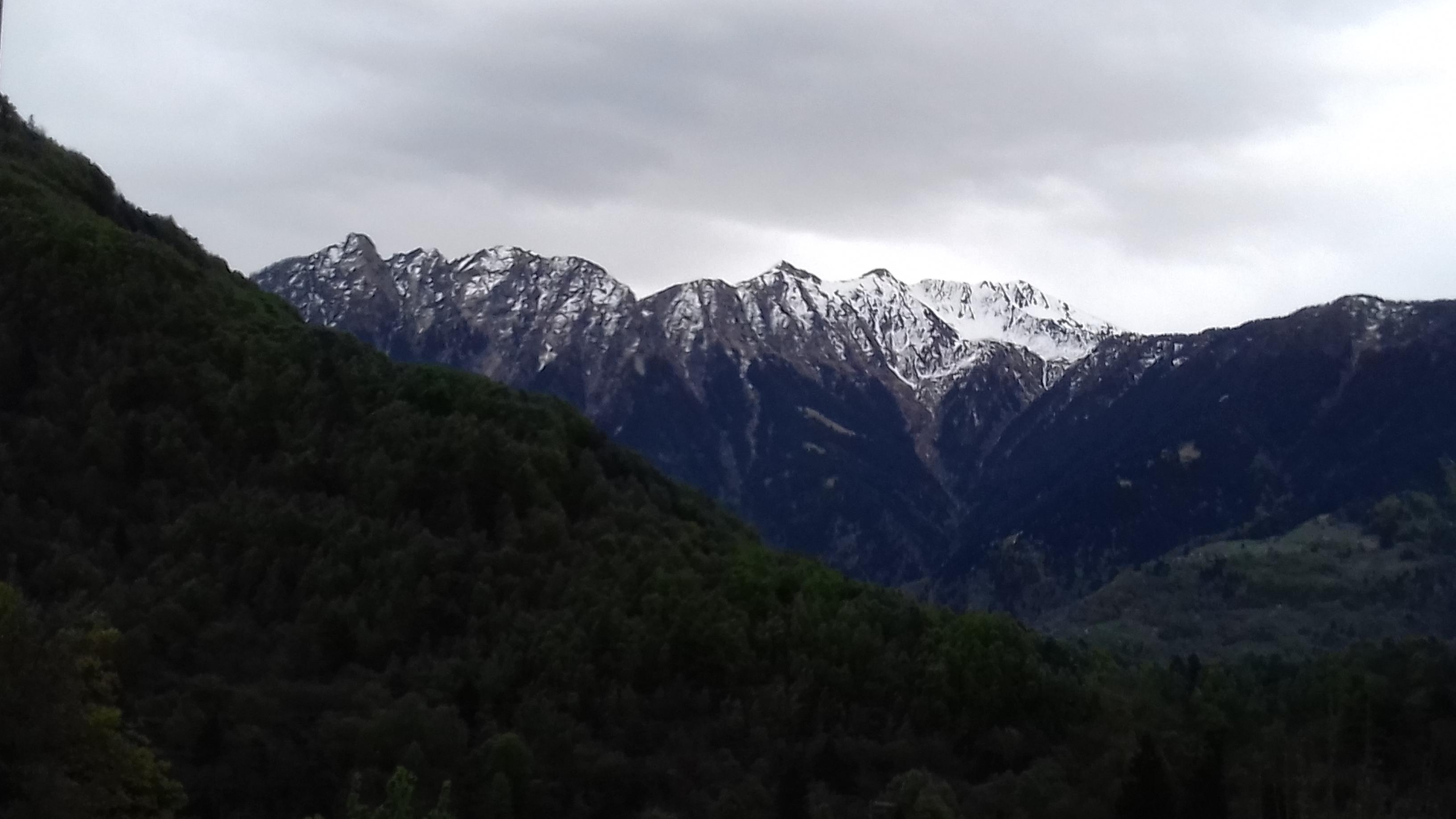
- Colmen of Dazio

- Coat of arms

- Location within Italy Location within Lombardy
- Coordinates: 46°10′N 9°35′E
- Country: Italy
- Region: Lombardy
- Province: Province of Sondrio (SO)

Area
  - Total: 3.7 km^{2} (1.4 sq mi)

Population (Dec. 2004)
  - Total: 380
  - Density: 100/km^{2} (270/sq mi)
- Time zone: UTC+1 (CET)
  - Summer (DST): UTC+2 (CEST)
- Postal code: 23010
- Dialing code: 0342

Dazio is a comune (municipality) in the Province of Sondrio in the Italian region Lombardy, located about 80 kilometres (50 mi) northeast of Milan and about 20 kilometres (12 mi) west of Sondrio. As of 31 December 2004, it had a population of 380 and an area of 3.7 square kilometres (1.4 mi^{2}).

Dazio borders the following municipalities: Ardenno, Civo, Morbegno, Talamona.

== Demographic evolution ==
Historical population

Year	Pop.	±%
1861	413	—
1871	412	−0.2%
1881	434	+5.3%
1901	432	−0.5%
1911	459	+6.2%

Year	Pop.	±%
1921	527	+14.8%
1931	504	−4.4%
1936	360	−28.6%
1951	374	+3.9%
1961	351	−6.1%

Year	Pop.	±%
1971	297	−15.4%
1981	323	+8.8%
1991	319	−1.2%
2001	347	+8.8%

Source: Data from ISTAT
