= Johannes Guler von Wyneck =

Statesman and chronicler (1562–1637)

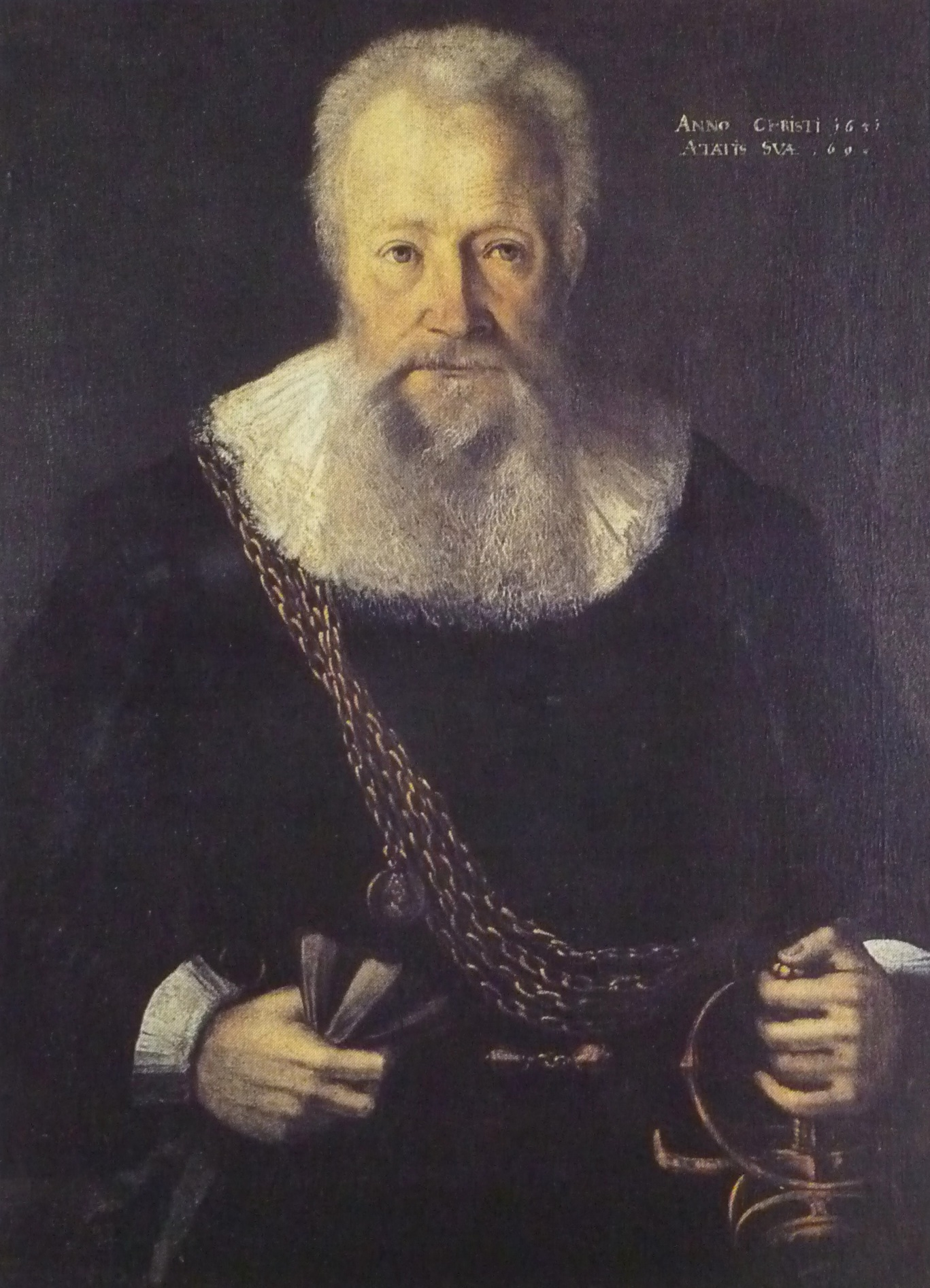
- Guler von Wyneck in his 69th year; oil on canvas by an unknown artist, 1631 (Rätisches Museum, Chur)
- Born: 31 October 1562; Davos, Three Leagues
- Died: 24 January 1637 (aged 74); Chur, Three Leagues
- Occupations: Statesman; military officer; historian; cartographer
- Notable work: Raetia (1616)
- Spouses: Barbla von Perini (m. 1583; died 1588) Elisabeth von Salis (m. 1591)

Johannes Guler von Wyneck (31 October 1562 – 24 January 1637) was a statesman, officer, historian and cartographer from Davos. He was Landammann (chief magistrate) of Davos and of the League of the Ten Jurisdictions from 1592 to 1604 and took part in many diplomatic missions. His Raetia (1616) contains a history of the Grisons and an unfinished description of the country and its subject lands.

== Biography ==
Johannes Guler von Wyneck was a member of the Guler von Wyneck family. He was the son of Hans Guler and Anna Buol. In 1583 he married Barbla von Perini (died 1588), and in 1591 Elisabeth von Salis, daughter of the vicari Andreas. Through this marriage he came into possession of the small castle of Wynegg above Malans in 1602; he made it his residence and from then on named himself after it.

In 1569 he accompanied his half-brother Peter, who had been elected vicari (judge), to the Valtellina for two years. After attending the Latin school in Chur, he studied in Zurich from 1574, in Geneva from 1580 and in Basel in 1582. He could not complete his studies, because in 1582 the people of Davos elected him district clerk (Landschreiber) and somewhat later also standard-bearer (Landesfähnrich). As early as 1587 he was given the office of governor (Landeshauptmann) of the Valtellina. From 1592 to 1604 he was Landammann of Davos, and thus at the same time Landammann of the League of the Ten Jurisdictions (Bundslandammann).

He was often entrusted with embassies: from 1600 to 1604 alone he took part in nine diplomatic missions to the Swiss Confederacy, Paris, Venice and Milan. He vehemently promoted the conclusion of an alliance with Venice, and in 1603 he became a knight of the Order of Saint Mark. In 1607 he commanded a Grisons regiment to secure the border with Milan. In the same year a criminal court (Strafgericht) in Chur dominated by partisans of Spain sentenced him to death. He was rehabilitated in 1607 by a court that was now pro-Venetian, and then withdrew from public politics for ten years. In 1618, during an embassy to the French court, he was knighted again.

To escape the Bündner Wirren, he moved with his family to Zurich, which granted him citizenship in 1619. In 1620, as colonel, he commanded the Grisons troops that twice tried in vain to reconquer the lost subject lands. In 1622 he supported the resistance of the people of the Prättigau against Austria. He then returned to his private affairs and took part in embassies only occasionally. In 1623 he acquired the small castle of Susenberg near Zurich by exchange, and in 1627 he moved to his seat of St. Margarethen in Chur. In 1607 he owned eight houses and 78 head of cattle in Davos, and he also had vineyards in the Bündner Herrschaft and in Chur.

Guler von Wyneck also did notable work as a historian and cartographer. His Raetia, dedicated to Louis XIII and printed in 1616, is an extensive compilation of works by chroniclers of the Grisons and of the Swiss Confederacy. Its first part describes the history of the Grisons, and its unfinished second part is a description of the Grisons and its subject lands, with five maps (Landtafeln). In 1622 he published Pündtnerischer Handlungen widerholte und vermehrte Deduction, which served above all to justify the Prättigau uprising.

== Works ==
Title page of the first edition of Raetia, printed by Johann Rudolf Wolf in Zurich in 1616. The head vignette shows Augsburg as the capital of Raetia Prima; Chur, the capital of Raetia Secunda, appears in the foot vignette, framed by allegories of the Rhine (left) and the Inn (right).

- Raetia, 1616
- Pündtnerischer Handlungen widerholte und vermehrte Deduction, 1622

== Bibliography ==
- J. Robbi, Ritter Johannes Guler von Wyneck, 1918
- J. Ferdmann, "Der Chronist und Staatsmann Johannes Guler von Wyneck als Mensch und Dichter", in Davoser Revue, 1937, 27–33, 84–90
- R. Feller, E. Bonjour, Geschichtsschreibung der Schweiz vom Spätmittelalter zur Neuzeit, 2nd ed., 1979, 332–334 (with sources and literature)
