= Talamona =

Talamona Talamuna (Lombard)
- Comune
- Comune di Talamona; Città di Talamona
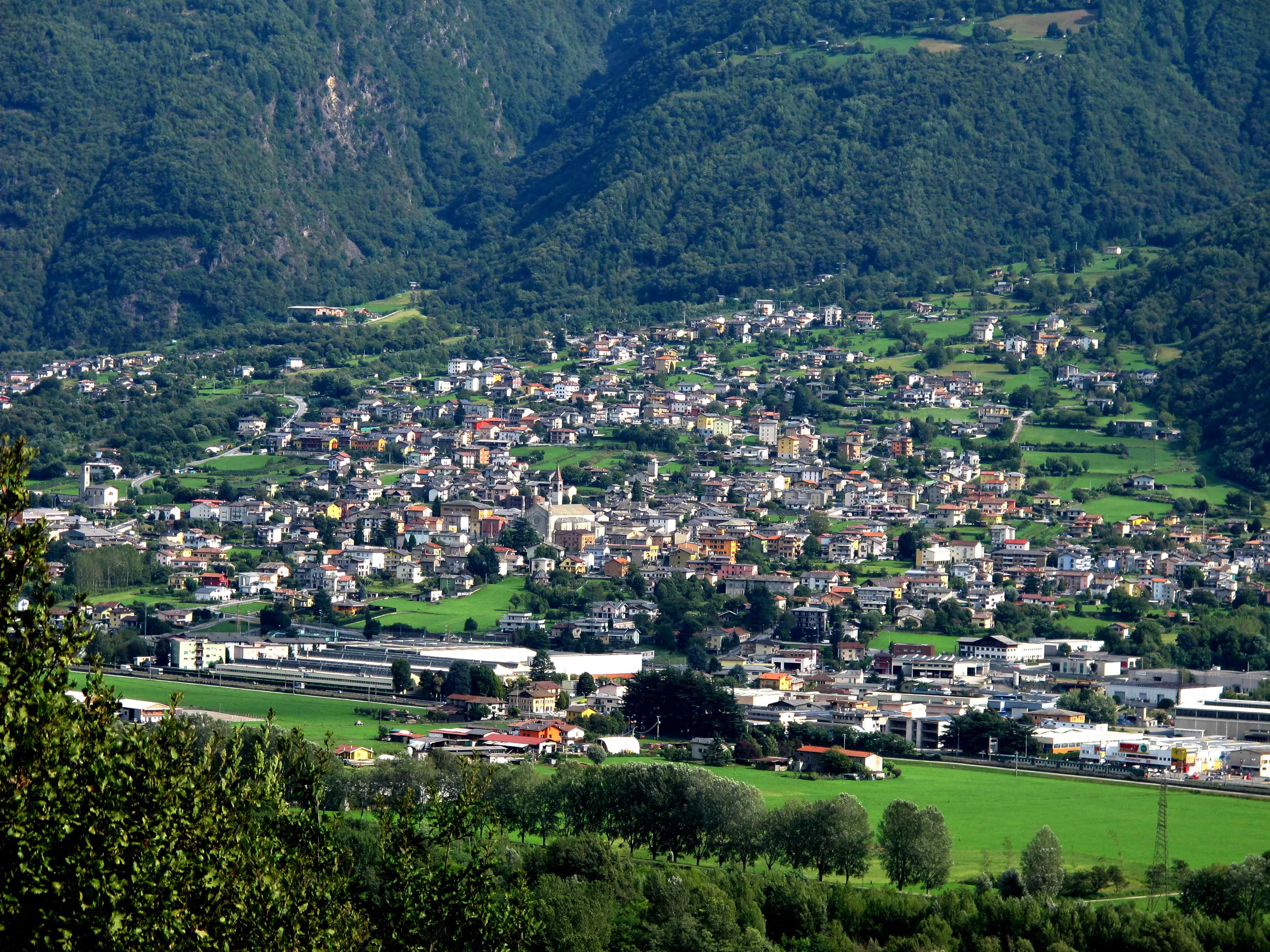
- Talamona

- Coat of arms

- Location within Italy Location within Lombardy
- Coordinates: 46°8′N 9°37′E
- Country: Italy
- Region: Lombardy
- Province: Province of Sondrio (SO)

Area
  - Total: 21.2 km^{2} (8.2 sq mi)
- Elevation: 285 m (935 ft)

Population (Dec. 2004)
  - Total: 4,623
  - Density: 218/km^{2} (565/sq mi)
- Demonym: Talamonesi
- Time zone: UTC+1 (CET)
  - Summer (DST): UTC+2 (CEST)
- Postal code: 23018
- Dialing code: 0342
- Website: Official website

Talamona (Lombard: Talamuna) is a comune (municipality) in the Province of Sondrio in the Italian region of Lombardy, located about 80 kilometres (50 mi) northeast of Milan and about 20 kilometres (12 mi) west of Sondrio. As of 31 December 2004, it had a population of 4,623 and an area of 21.2 square kilometres (8.2 mi^{2}).

Talamona borders the following municipalities: Albaredo per San Marco, Ardenno, Dazio, Forcola, Morbegno, Tartano.

== Demographic evolution ==
Historical population

Year	Pop.	±%
1861	2,504	—
1871	2,517	+0.5%
1881	2,619	+4.1%
1901	2,723	+4.0%
1911	2,792	+2.5%

Year	Pop.	±%
1921	3,052	+9.3%
1931	3,038	−0.5%
1936	2,931	−3.5%
1951	3,150	+7.5%
1961	3,578	+13.6%

Year	Pop.	±%
1971	3,789	+5.9%
1981	4,057	+7.1%
1991	4,261	+5.0%
2001	4,506	+5.7%

Source: Data from ISTAT
