= Piz Canfinal =

Mountain in Switzerland

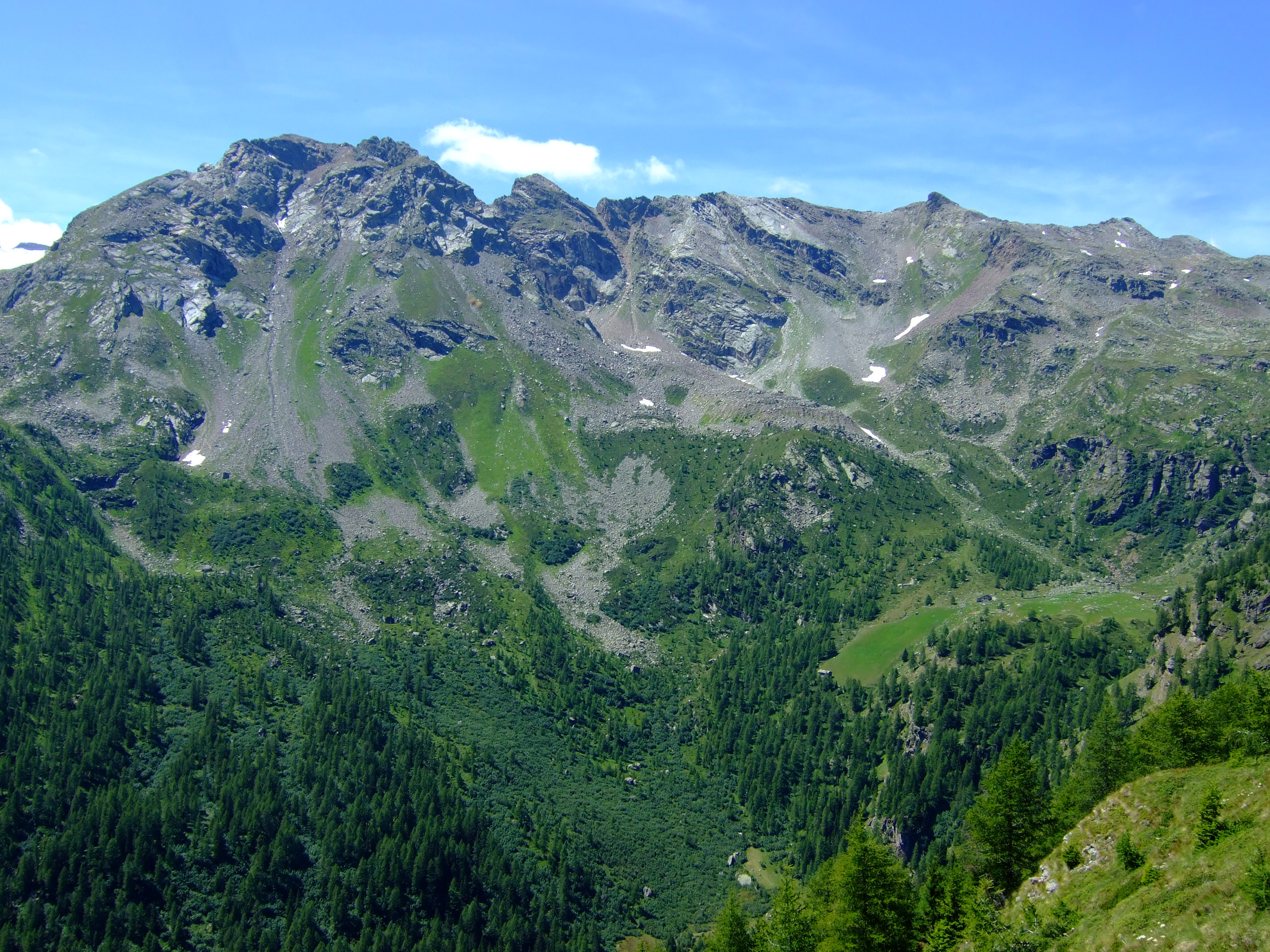
- Corno Campascio and Piz Canfinal (right summit) from the Val Poschiavo

Highest point
- Elevation: 2,812 m (9,226 ft)
- Prominence: 184 m (604 ft)
- Parent peak: Piz Bernina
- Coordinates: 46°19′13.5″N 9°59′8.5″E

Geography
- Location within Alps
- Location: Graubünden, Switzerland; Lombardy, Italy
- Parent range: Bernina Range

Piz Canfinal is a mountain of the Bernina Range (Alps), located on the border between Italy and Switzerland. It lies between the Val Malenco and the Val Poschiavo, north of the Corno Campascio.
