= Johann Peter Guler von Wyneck =

Grisons military officer (1594–1656)

- Born: 1594
- Died: 8/18 January 1656; Chur, Three Leagues
- Occupations: Military officer; politician
- Spouse: Margreth von Hartmannis

Johann Peter Guler von Wyneck (1594 – 8/18 January 1656) was a military officer and politician from the Grisons. He was Landammann (chief magistrate) of Davos and of the League of the Ten Jurisdictions in 1620 and 1621, a colonel in French and Grisons service, and a fierce opponent of the Spanish-Austrian party.

== Biography ==
Johann Peter Guler von Wyneck was a member of the Guler von Wyneck family. He was the son of Johannes Guler von Wyneck and Elisabeth von Salis. He married Margreth von Hartmannis, daughter of Hartmann von Hartmannis. He lived in Davos, Malans and Chur.

In 1620 and 1621 he was Landammann of Davos, and thus Landammann of the League of the Ten Jurisdictions (Bundslandammann). He was a colonel in French and Grisons service, and in 1635 he had his own regiment. As a fierce opponent of the Spanish-Austrian party, he took part in the Prättigau uprising of 1622 and in the campaigns in the Valtellina of 1620, 1621, 1624–1627 and 1635–1637. From 1637 to 1639 he commanded the Rhine fortification (Rheinschanze) near Malans. At first a comrade-in-arms of Jörg Jenatsch, he later became his vehement opponent. In 1642 he led the opponents of Davos in the dispute over its traditional predominance in the League of the Ten Jurisdictions. He promoted the buying out of Austrian rights in the League.

Guler von Wyneck died during an adventurous attempt to storm the bishop's residence (Hof) in Chur. It is unclear whether his reasons were mainly confessional (secularization, and taking the side of Zurich in the First War of Villmergen) or party-political (the overthrow of the Spanish party).

== Bibliography ==
- A. Mooser, "Die Guler von Wyneck", in Bündnerisches Monatsblatt, 1934, 129, 161
- F. Maissen, Die drei Bünde in der zweiten Hälfte des 17. Jahrhunderts in politischer, kirchengeschichtlicher und volkskundlicher Schau, 1, 1966
- A. Pfister, Jörg Jenatsch, 4th ed., 1984
