= Civo =

- Comune
- Comune di Civo
- Coat of arms

- Location within Italy Location within Lombardy
- Coordinates: 46°9′N 9°34′E
- Country: Italy
- Region: Lombardy
- Province: Province of Sondrio (SO)
- Frazioni: Pontediganda, San Bello, San Biagio, Santa Croce, Rebustella, Marsellenico, Regolido, Chempo, Vallate, Serone, Roncaglia di Sopra, Roncaglia di Sotto, Poira, Caspano, Naguarido, Ca'Busnarda, Ca'della Ceva, Ca'Bertolda, Ventrino, Scalotta, Ca' della Linda, Cadelpicco, Cadelsasso, Ponte del Baffo, Cevo, Bedoglio, San Bernardo Ledino, Carècc, Pedruscià, Pràsucc, Pèsc and Civo Center

Area
  - Total: 25.2 km^{2} (9.7 sq mi)

Population (Dec. 2020)
  - Total: 1,111
  - Density: 44.1/km^{2} (114/sq mi)
- Time zone: UTC+1 (CET)
  - Summer (DST): UTC+2 (CEST)
- Postal code: 23010
- Dialing code: 0342

Civo is a comune (municipality) in the Province of Sondrio in the Italian region Lombardy, located about 60 Miles(95 km) northeast of Milan and about 15 Miles (24 km)west of Sondrio. As of 31 December 2004, it had a population of 1,052 and an area of 25.2 km^{2} (9.7 sq mi).

The municipality is famous for its Cincètt (little chapel on the pedestrian woodroads), wine terrasses, its Nebbiolo red wine, dry stonewalls(Unesco) as well as the typical rustical stonehouses on the border of the chestnut woods often with very old colourful fresks.

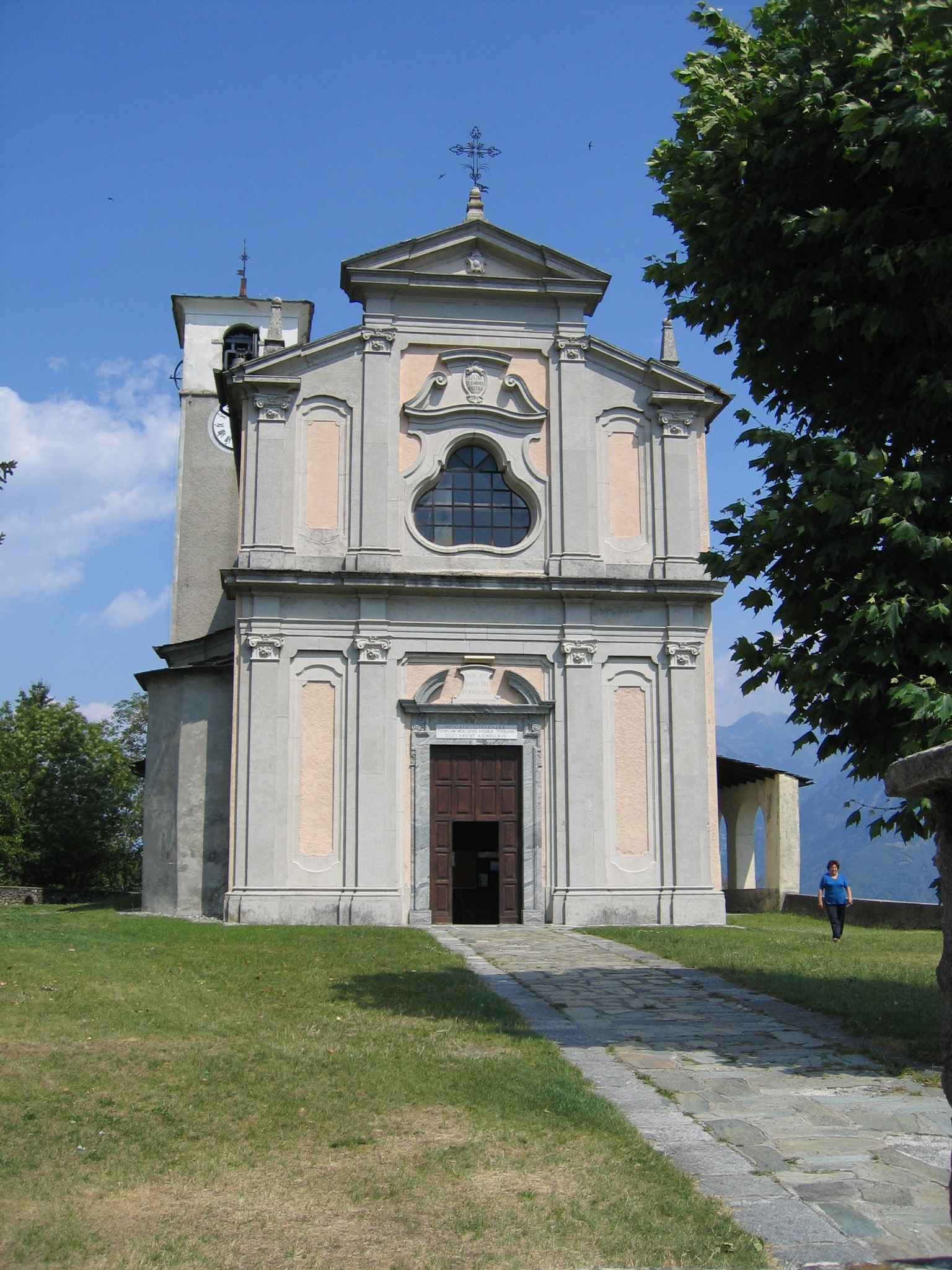
Parish Church

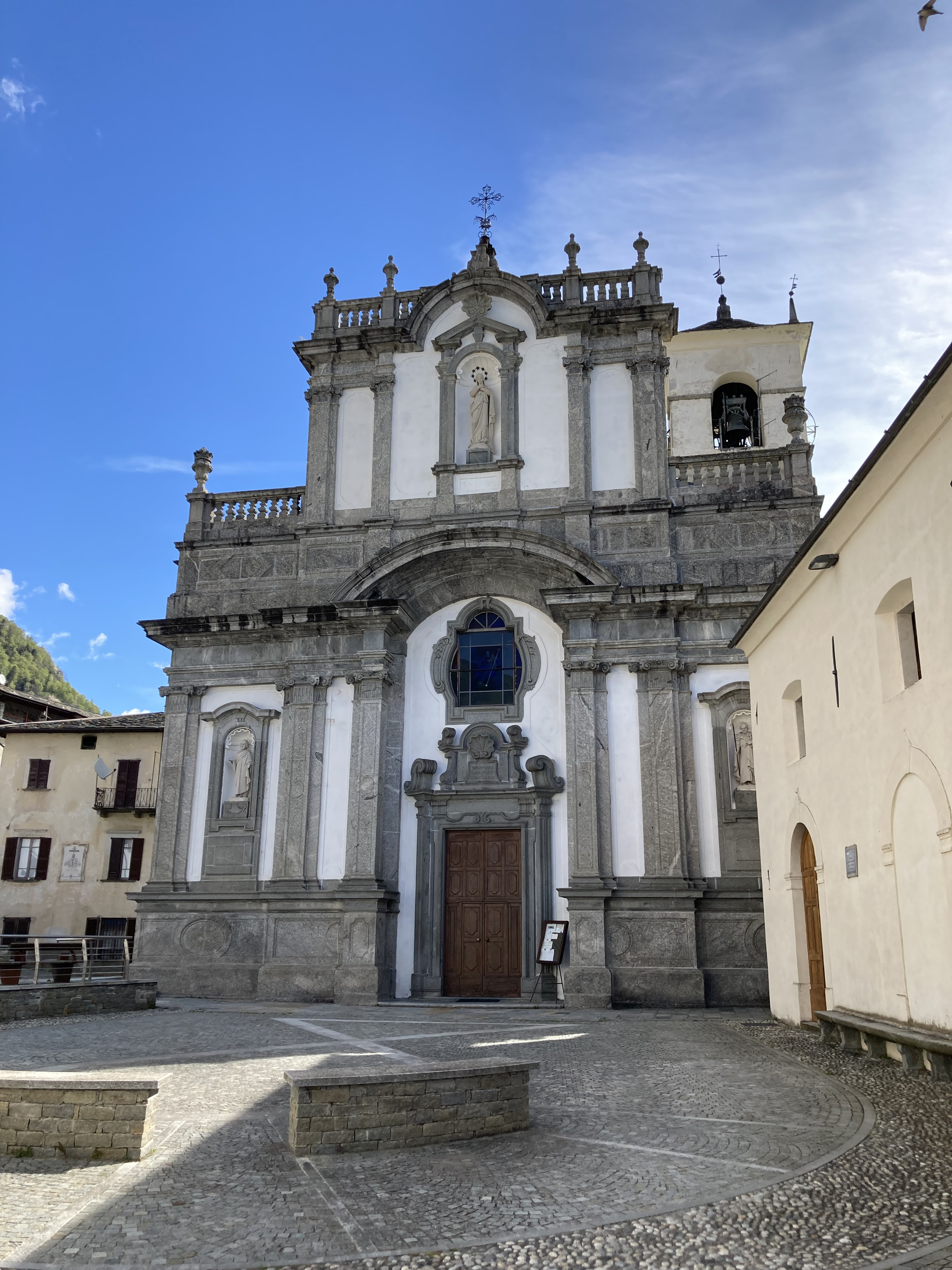
Church of San Bartolomeo, Caspano

Civo borders the following municipalities: Ardenno, Dazio, Mello, Morbegno, Novate Mezzola, Traona, Val Masino.

== Demographic evolution ==
Historical population

Year	Pop.	±%
1861	1,926	—
1871	2,102	+9.1%
1881	2,155	+2.5%
1901	2,226	+3.3%
1911	1,990	−10.6%

Year	Pop.	±%
1921	2,368	+19.0%
1931	2,048	−13.5%
1936	1,817	−11.3%
1951	1,649	−9.2%
1961	1,519	−7.9%

Year	Pop.	±%
1971	1,240	−18.4%
1981	1,096	−11.6%
1991	1,011	−7.8%
2001	1,026	+1.5%

Source: Data from ISTAT
