= Guler von Wyneck family =

Noble family of Davos, Grisons

The Guler von Wyneck family (also Guler) is a noble family of officeholders from Davos, later also resident in Malans and Chur. From 1536 until 1621 members of the family repeatedly held the office of Landammann (chief magistrate) of Davos, and with it that of Landammann of the League of the Ten Jurisdictions. In 1550 the family received a title of nobility from the Austrian court. It reached its political and socio-economic peak with the statesman, officer and chronicler Johannes Guler von Wyneck, who named himself after the small castle of Wynegg above Malans, the family's residence until the second half of the 18th century.

== History ==
Coat of arms of the Guler von Wyneck family in the first edition of Raetia, the chronicle written by Johannes Guler von Wyneck and printed by Johann Rudolf Wolf in Zurich in 1616 (ETH Library, Zurich, Rar 9305)

It is not known when or from where the family came to Davos. According to the Rhetische Cronica by Fortunat Sprecher von Bernegg, a Lucas Guler was captain (Hauptmann) of the people of Davos in 1322, and in that role he is said to have fought on the side of the Vaz family in a feud against the bishop of Chur. However, the name Guler is missing from a record of the family names of Davos from the middle of the 15th century. The family's continuous genealogy begins with Peter Guler, who according to Hans Ardüser was one of the leaders of the troops of the League of the Ten Jurisdictions at the Battle of Calven in 1499.

His son Hans Guler became the first member of the family to be Landammann of Davos in 1536, and thus at the same time Landammann of the League of the Ten Jurisdictions (Bundslandammann). Until 1621 the Gulers held this office for at least 28 further years, among them Peter Guler and Johann Peter Guler von Wyneck. After that they disappear from the lists of the League's Landammänner. Nor is any Guler found among the Landammänner of Davos known by name after the arbitral award of 1644 by Johann Heinrich Waser, which ended this combination of offices.

Hans Guler was also the first member of the family to hold an office in the Valtellina, in 1531. The Gulers held such offices four more times in the rest of the 16th century, the last time in 1569. In 1550 the family received a title of nobility from the Austrian court. In the 16th and 17th centuries several Gulers held officer posts, mainly in Venetian and French mercenary service. The family reached its political and socio-economic peak with the statesman, officer and chronicler Johannes Guler von Wyneck, who named himself after the small castle (Schlösschen) of Wynegg (Wyneck, Weineck) above Malans, which he had acquired through marriage. Wynegg remained the family's residence until the second half of the 18th century.

From the 16th to the 17th century the Gulers intermarried several times with the Buol, Gugelberg von Moos, Salis and Sprecher families. Single marriages linked them with, among others, the von Castelmur, Hartmannis and Menhardt families, the Meyer, a family of councilors (Ratsgeschlecht) of Chur, the von Ott, von Planta and Schmid von Grüneck families, and the Rahn of Zurich.

== Bibliography ==
- A. Mooser, "Die Guler von Wyneck", in Bündnerisches Monatsblatt, 1934, no. 5, 129–152
- A. Mooser, "Die Guler von Wyneck (Fortsetzung und Schluss)", in Bündnerisches Monatsblatt, 1934, no. 6, 161–184
