= Vittoria Ligari =

Italian painter (1713–1783)

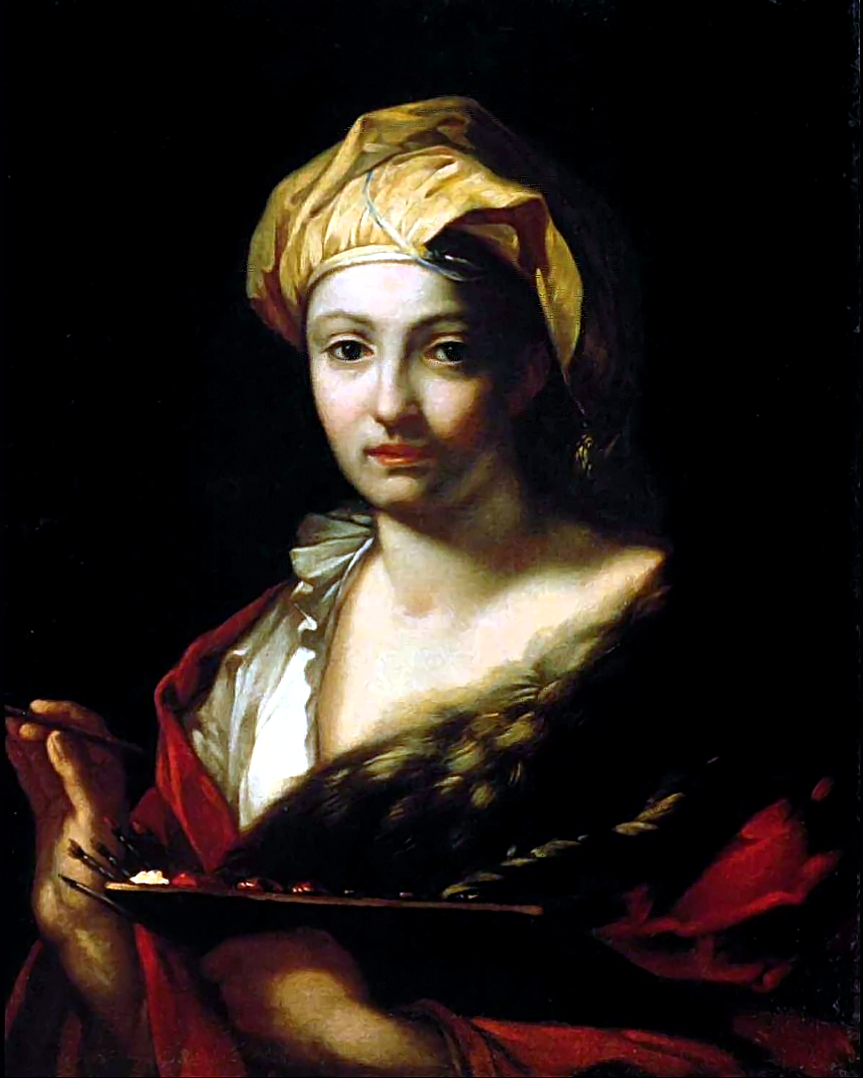
- "Portrait of His Daughter Vittoria", by Pietro Ligari
- Born: 14 February 1713; Milan, Holy Roman Empire
- Died: 9 October 1783 (aged 70)
- Known for: Painting
- Style: Christian art

Vittoria Ligari (14 February 1713 - 9 October 1783) was an Italian painter.

== Life and work ==
Vittoria Ligari was born in Milan, near San Babila, in February 1713. Her mother was Nunziata Steiningher and her father was Pietro Ligari. She died in December 1783.

== Notable works ==
- San Giuseppe con Bambino (Saint Joseph with Child), between 1730 and 1783, Ligari Foundation, Valtellina Museum of History and Art

== Gallery ==
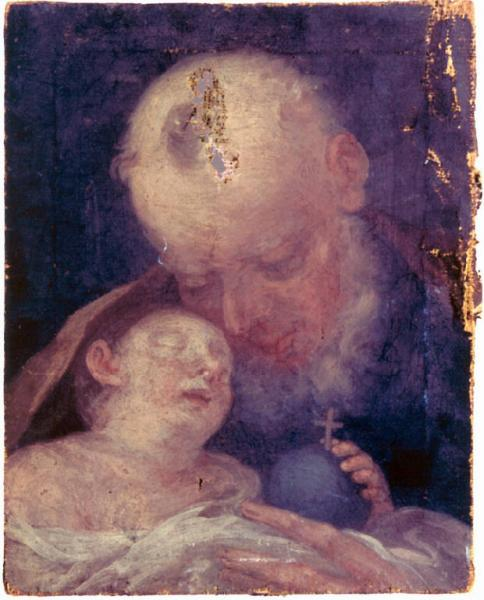
Saint Joseph with Child, after 1730 - before 1783
