= Buglio in Monte =

- Comune
- Comune di Buglio in Monte
- Location within Italy Location within Lombardy
- Coordinates: 46°11′N 9°41′E
- Country: Italy
- Region: Lombardy
- Province: Province of Sondrio (SO)

Area
  - Total: 27.8 km^{2} (10.7 sq mi)

Population (Dec. 2004)
  - Total: 2,066
  - Density: 74.3/km^{2} (192/sq mi)
- Time zone: UTC+1 (CET)
  - Summer (DST): UTC+2 (CEST)
- Postal code: 23010
- Dialing code: 0342

Buglio in Monte is a comune (municipality) in the Province of Sondrio in the Italian region Lombardy, located about 90 kilometres (56 mi) northeast of Milan and about 14 kilometres (9 mi) west of Sondrio. As of 31 December 2004, it had a population of 2,066 and an area of 27.8 square kilometres (10.7 mi^{2}).

Buglio in Monte borders the following municipalities: Ardenno, Berbenno di Valtellina, Chiesa in Valmalenco, Colorina, Forcola, Torre di Santa Maria, Val Masino.

== Demographic evolution ==
Historical population

Year	Pop.	±%
1861	893	—
1871	1,121	+25.5%
1881	1,162	+3.7%
1901	1,312	+12.9%
1911	1,496	+14.0%

Year	Pop.	±%
1921	1,566	+4.7%
1931	1,574	+0.5%
1936	1,483	−5.8%
1951	1,792	+20.8%
1961	1,822	+1.7%

Year	Pop.	±%
1971	1,986	+9.0%
1981	2,046	+3.0%
1991	2,094	+2.3%
2001	2,038	−2.7%

Source: Data from ISTAT
