= Val Masino =

Val Masino Val Màsen
- Comune
- Comune di Val Masino
- Location within Italy Location within Lombardy
- Coordinates: 46°13′N 9°38′E
- Country: Italy
- Region: Lombardy
- Province: Province of Sondrio (SO)
- Frazioni: Bagni del Masino, Case Sparse, Cataeggio, Filorera, Piana, San Martino, Visido di Fuori

Area
  - Total: 116.0 km^{2} (44.8 sq mi)
- Elevation: 787 m (2,582 ft)

Population (30/11/2018)
  - Total: 883
  - Density: 7.61/km^{2} (19.7/sq mi)
- Time zone: UTC+1 (CET)
  - Summer (DST): UTC+2 (CEST)
- Postal code: 23010
- Dialing code: 0342
- ISTAT code: 014074
- Website: Official website

Val Masino (Western Lombard: Val Màsen) is a comune (municipality) in the Province of Sondrio in the Italian region Lombardy, located about 90 kilometres (56 mi) northeast of Milan and about 20 kilometres (12 mi) northwest of Sondrio, on the border with Switzerland. As of 31 December 2004, it had a population of 962 and an area of 116.0 square kilometres (44.8 mi^{2}).

Val Masino and Val Di Mello are one of the most renowned areas for all climbing disciplines (sport climbing, trad multipitching, bouldering and alpinism). It has become famous internationally through the Melloblocco bouldering festival, which brings together thousands of climbers from all over the world.

The municipality of Val Masino contains the frazioni (subdivisions, mainly villages and hamlets) Bagni del Masino, Case Sparse, Cataeggio, Filorera, Piana, San Martino, Visido di Fuori.

Val Masino borders the following municipalities: Ardenno, Bondo (Switzerland), Buglio in Monte, Chiesa in Valmalenco, Civo, Novate Mezzola, Stampa (Switzerland), Vicosoprano (Switzerland).

== Demographic evolution ==
Historical population

Year	Pop.	±%
1861	768	—
1871	865	+12.6%
1881	933	+7.9%
1901	994	+6.5%
1911	1,098	+10.5%

Year	Pop.	±%
1921	1,116	+1.6%
1931	1,106	−0.9%
1936	1,077	−2.6%
1951	1,176	+9.2%
1961	1,131	−3.8%

Year	Pop.	±%
1971	1,061	−6.2%
1981	989	−6.8%
1991	931	−5.9%
2001	963	+3.4%

Source: Data from ISTAT

== Free-Climbing ==
With its tall granite cliffs and boulders, Val di Mello is often called “Little Yosemite”. It has historic and ecological similarities with the famous Californian park. In the Valley it is possibile to practice the disciplines: Sportsclimbing, trad multipitching, bouldering and alpinism.

The valley of Val Masino/Val di Mello had become famous due to the MelloBlocco event, the biggest bouldering festival all over the world.

There are more than 2000 bouldering routes (grade from 5a to 8c) and more than 200 Sportclimbing routes (grade from 5a to 9a grade).

The most iconic Sportclimbing area is "Sasso Remenno", with the largest and biggest glacial rock deposit in Europe. Its walls offer a variety of styles from overhangs to crack, and especially slabs.

The main routes bolter is Simone Pedeferri (the local climber legend) who has promoted the entire area from 90's til now.
