= Hans Guler =

Grisons politician (1500–1563)

- Born: 1500
- Died: 1 March 1563 (aged 62–63)
- Occupation: Politician
- Spouses: Barbara Thöny; Anna Buol (m. 1562)

Hans Guler (1500 – 1 March 1563) was a politician from Davos. He was several times Landammann (chief magistrate) of Davos and of the League of the Ten Jurisdictions, was repeatedly an envoy of the Three Leagues, and promoted the Reformation in Davos.

== Biography ==
Hans Guler was a member of the Guler von Wyneck family. He was the son of Peter. According to Hans Ardüser, his father was one of the leaders of the troops of the League of the Ten Jurisdictions at the Battle of Calven in 1499. Hans Guler first married Barbara Thöny (died 1560), and in 1562 Anna Buol (born 1544), daughter of Paul, Landammann of Davos. He was the brother-in-law of Martin Beeli von Belfort, Landammann of Davos.

He spent most of his youth abroad, above all in Tyrol, and owned several estates in Davos. In the First Musso War (1525) he was colonel (Oberst) of the League of the Ten Jurisdictions. In 1531 he was podestà in Traona, and in 1537 in Tirano. He is recorded as Landammann of Davos, and thus Landammann of the League of the Ten Jurisdictions (Bundslandammann), in 1535, 1540, 1544, 1557 and 1561–1563. He was several times an envoy of the Three Leagues. He promoted the Reformation in Davos. In 1550 a criminal court (Strafgericht) convicted him, among other things, of accepting French pensions; he was rehabilitated in 1551.

== Bibliography ==
- A. Mooser, "Die Guler von Wyneck", in Bündnerisches Monatsblatt, 1934, 129, 161
