= Hartmann von Hartmannis =

Grisons politician (died 1603)

- Died: 3 March 1603
- Occupations: Politician; officer

Hartmann von Hartmannis (first mentioned 1569; died 3 March 1603) was a politician and officer of the Three Leagues. He was governor (Landeshauptmann) of the Valtellina in 1581 and 1593 and Landammann of the jurisdiction of Churwalden in 1584 and 1598, and he rose to the rank of colonel in French service. He was the main initiator of the Reforma of 1603, an attempt to combat corruption in the Grisons that failed.

== Biography ==
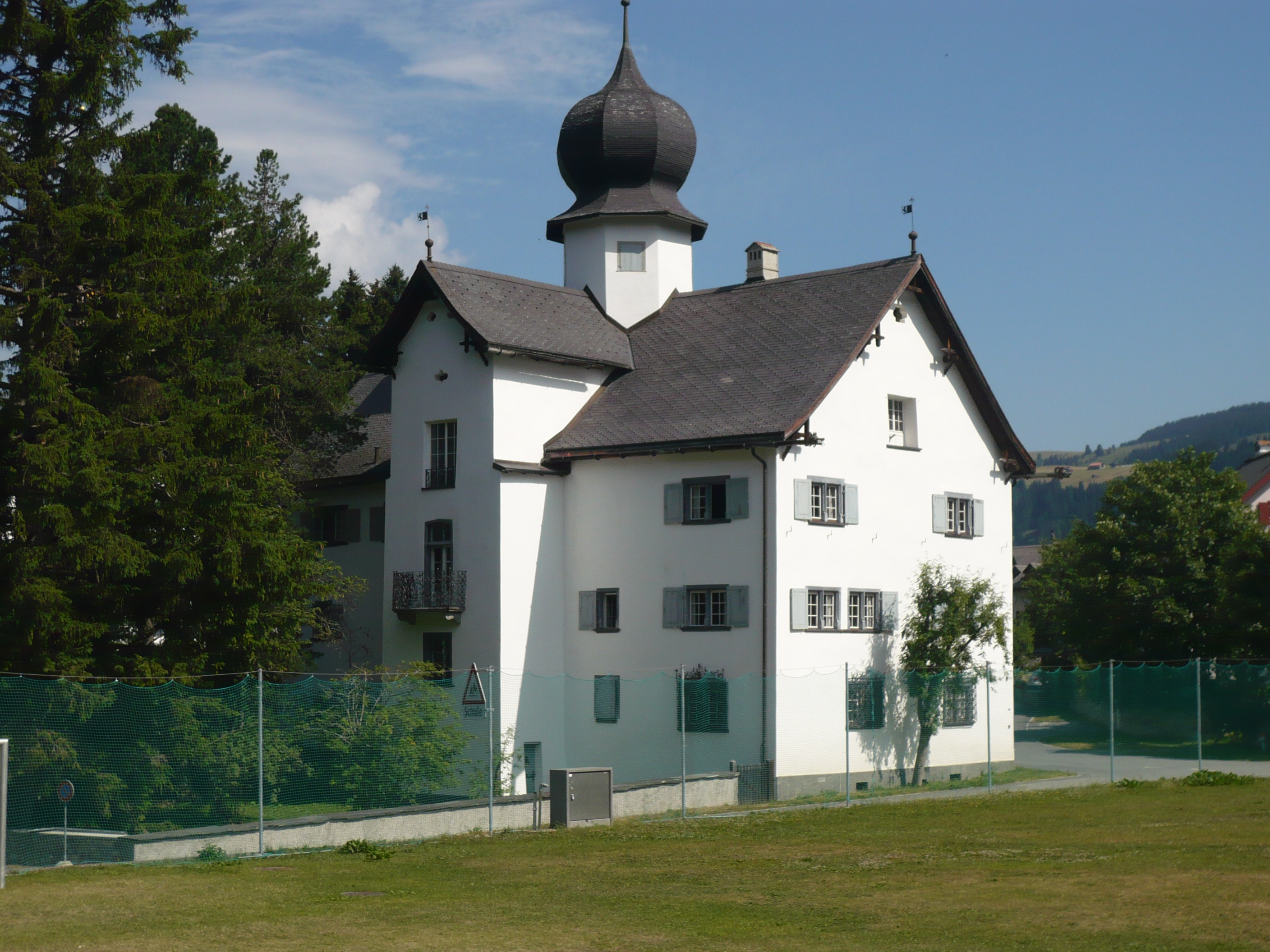
The Schlössli in Parpan

Hartmann von Hartmannis is first mentioned in 1569. He was married four times. His daughter Margreth married Johann Peter Guler von Wyneck. His daughter Anna, the widow of Rudolf Salis, married Ambrosius von Planta.

In 1569–1571 he was podestà of Piuro (Plurs). In the Valtellina he was vicari (judge) in 1575 and governor in 1581 and 1593. In 1584 and 1598 he was Landammann (chief magistrate) of the jurisdiction (Gerichtsgemeinde) of Churwalden. He often acted as advocate (Fürsprecher), judge and envoy. In French service he rose to the rank of colonel, led a Grisons regiment in 1589 and was ennobled.

Hartmannis was among the most respected men of the Grisons in his time. He was a loyal partisan of France, and at the same time he sought to remedy the political abuses in the state of the Three Leagues. In 1598–1599 he rejected Venetian attempts to bribe him. He was the main initiator of the Reforma of 1603, which ultimately failed. It was meant to combat corruption in the Grisons, in particular the practices in the award of offices in the subject territories. He built the Schlössli in Parpan.

== Bibliography ==
- P. E. Grimm, Die Anfänge der Bündner Aristokratie im 15. und 16. Jahrhundert, 1981, 225–226
