= Colorina =

- Comune
- Comune di Colorina
- Location within Italy Location within Lombardy
- Coordinates: 46°9′N 9°44′E
- Country: Italy
- Region: Lombardy
- Province: Province of Sondrio (SO)
- Frazioni: Valle, Piona, Selvetta

Area
  - Total: 18.0 km^{2} (6.9 sq mi)
- Elevation: 385 m (1,263 ft)

Population (Dec. 2004)
  - Total: 1,468
  - Density: 81.6/km^{2} (211/sq mi)
- Time zone: UTC+1 (CET)
  - Summer (DST): UTC+2 (CEST)
- Postal code: 23010
- Dialing code: 0342
- Website: Official website

Colorina is a comune (municipality) in the Province of Sondrio in the Italian region Lombardy, located about 90 kilometres (56 mi) northeast of Milan and about 10 kilometres (6 mi) west of Sondrio. As of 31 December 2004, it had a population of 1,468 and an area of 18.0 square kilometres (6.9 mi^{2}).

The municipality of Colorina contains the frazioni (subdivisions, mainly villages and hamlets) Valle, Piona, and Selvetta.

Colorina borders the following municipalities: Berbenno di Valtellina, Buglio in Monte, Forcola, Fusine.

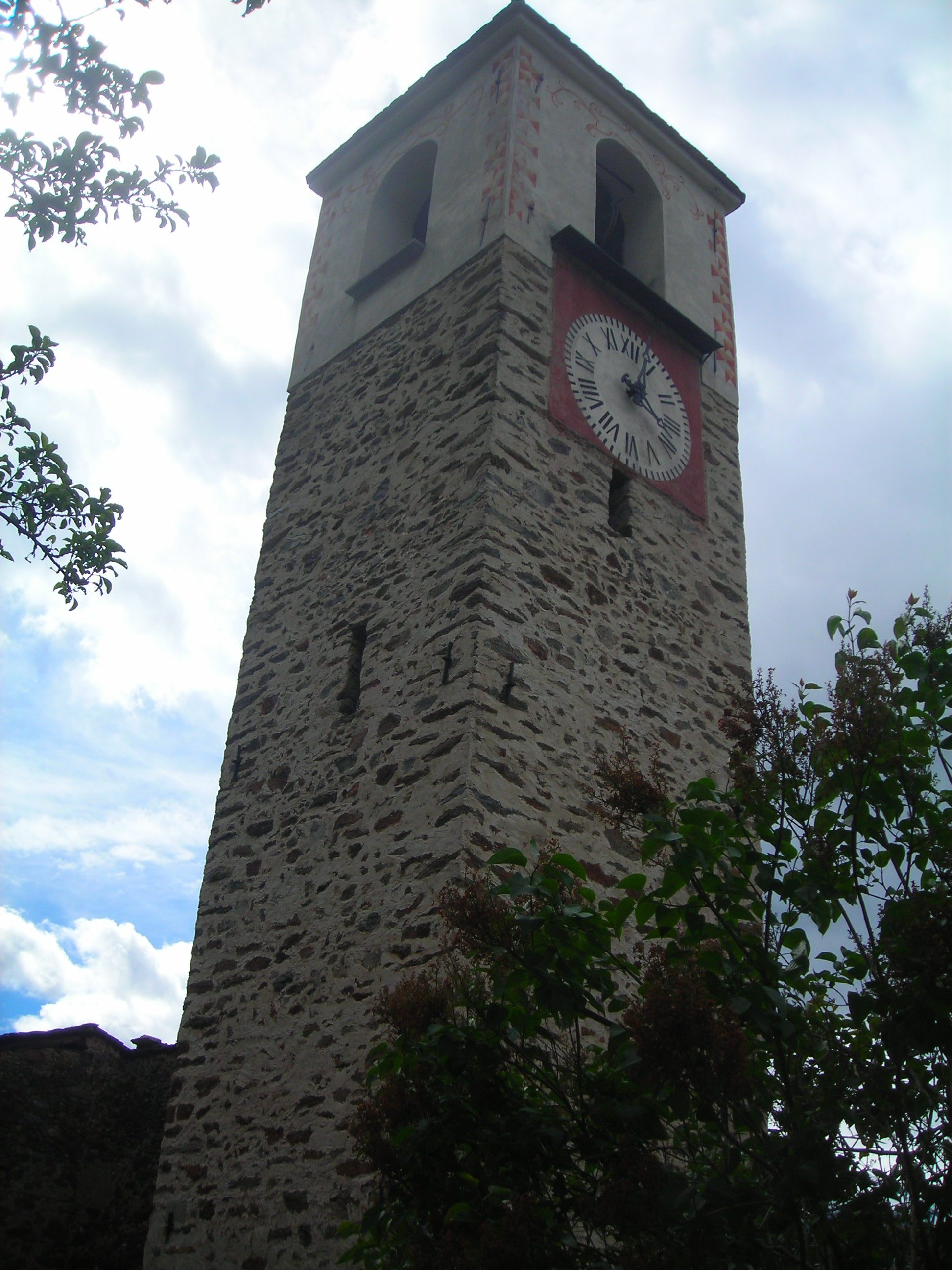
medieval tower

== Demographic evolution ==
Historical population

Year	Pop.	±%
1861	822	—
1871	939	+14.2%
1881	1,005	+7.0%
1901	1,258	+25.2%
1911	1,537	+22.2%

Year	Pop.	±%
1921	1,543	+0.4%
1931	1,553	+0.6%
1936	1,433	−7.7%
1951	1,521	+6.1%
1961	1,514	−0.5%

Year	Pop.	±%
1971	1,590	+5.0%
1981	1,557	−2.1%
1991	1,480	−4.9%
2001	1,453	−1.8%

Source: Data from ISTAT
