= Andrea Grego =

Blessed Andrea Gago OP
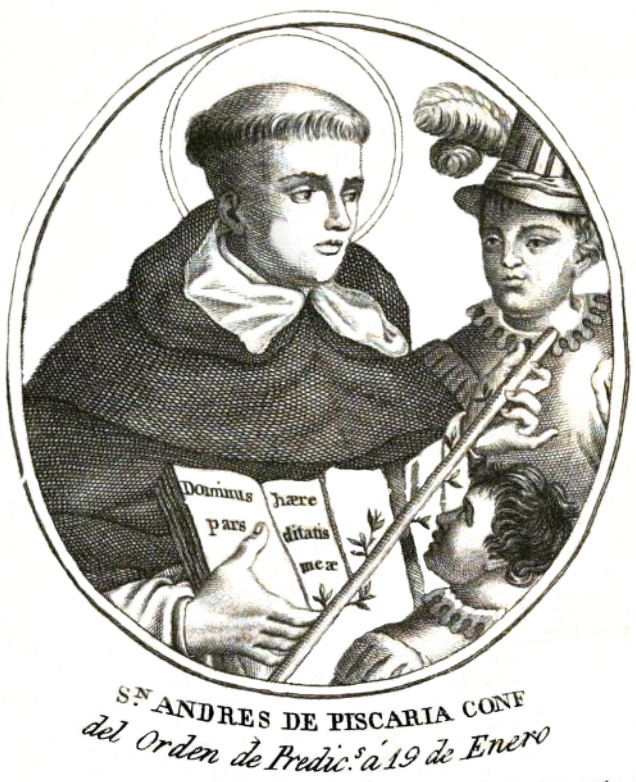
- Born: 1400; Peschiera del Garda, Verona, Italy
- Died: 18 January 1485 (aged 84–85); Morbegno, Sondrio, Italy
- Venerated in: Roman Catholic Church
- Beatified: 26 September 1820, Saint Peter's Basilica, Papal States by Pope Pius VII
- Major shrine: Church of the Dominicans of Morbegno
- Attributes: Dominican habit

Andrea Grego (1400 in Peschiera del Garda – 18 January 1485 in Morbegno) was a Dominican friar and preacher. He is venerated as a Blessed in the Roman Catholic church.

== Biography ==
He was a typical life of a friar preacher, devoted to the evangelisation of villages. He was appointed at the Convento di Brescia and from there he moved to St. Mark's Square in Florence, where he completed his formation as a disciple of Anthony of Padua. Mandated in the Valtellina, he worked for 45 years for his ministry, preaching his beliefs. He installed new parishes and created monasteries, consolidated in 1475 the convent of St. Peter Martyr of Morbegno.

He died on 18 January 1485 in Morbegno and was buried at the church of the Dominicans of Morbegno, dedicated to SS. Antonio Abate and Martha.

== Veneration ==
Pope Pius VII on 26 September 1820 confirmed Grego's veneration. His feast day is on 19 January, and in the Roman Martyrology at that date it is remembered: "At Morbegno on the Alps in Lombardy, Blessed Andrea da Peschiera Grego, priest of the Order of Preachers, who for a long time walked all over the region, living soberly among the poor and fraternally conciliating the minds of all.''<(Roman martyrology)

After the Napoleonic Wars, the relics of Andrea Grego were solemnly translated into the Chapel of St. Joseph to the Collegiate of St. John the Baptist of Morbegno. In 1933, it was created to accommodate the remains of an urn in Baroque style and in the sixties, the wax mask that still covers his face.

In the 1990s, the Morbegnese Collegiate donated to the parish of San Martino in Peschiera del Garda, the hometown of the saint, a relic of the Blessed in an eighteenth-century relic, now placed in the new church dedicated to the Blessed and built in 1988 in Peschiera.

Another relic remained in the church of St. Martin, while in the sanctuary of the Madonna del Frassino, always in Peschiera, are the rock on which Andrea was sleeping when they quarreled with his brothers for his faith, and a sixteenth-century painting by Paolo Farinati that depicts the Blessed together with Mary, Saint Francis and Saint Sebastian.

== Sources ==
- Blessed Andrea Grego from Peschiera, in Saints, Blessed and Witnesses - Encyclopedia of Saints, santiebeati.it.
