= Forcola =

- Comune
- Comune di Forcola
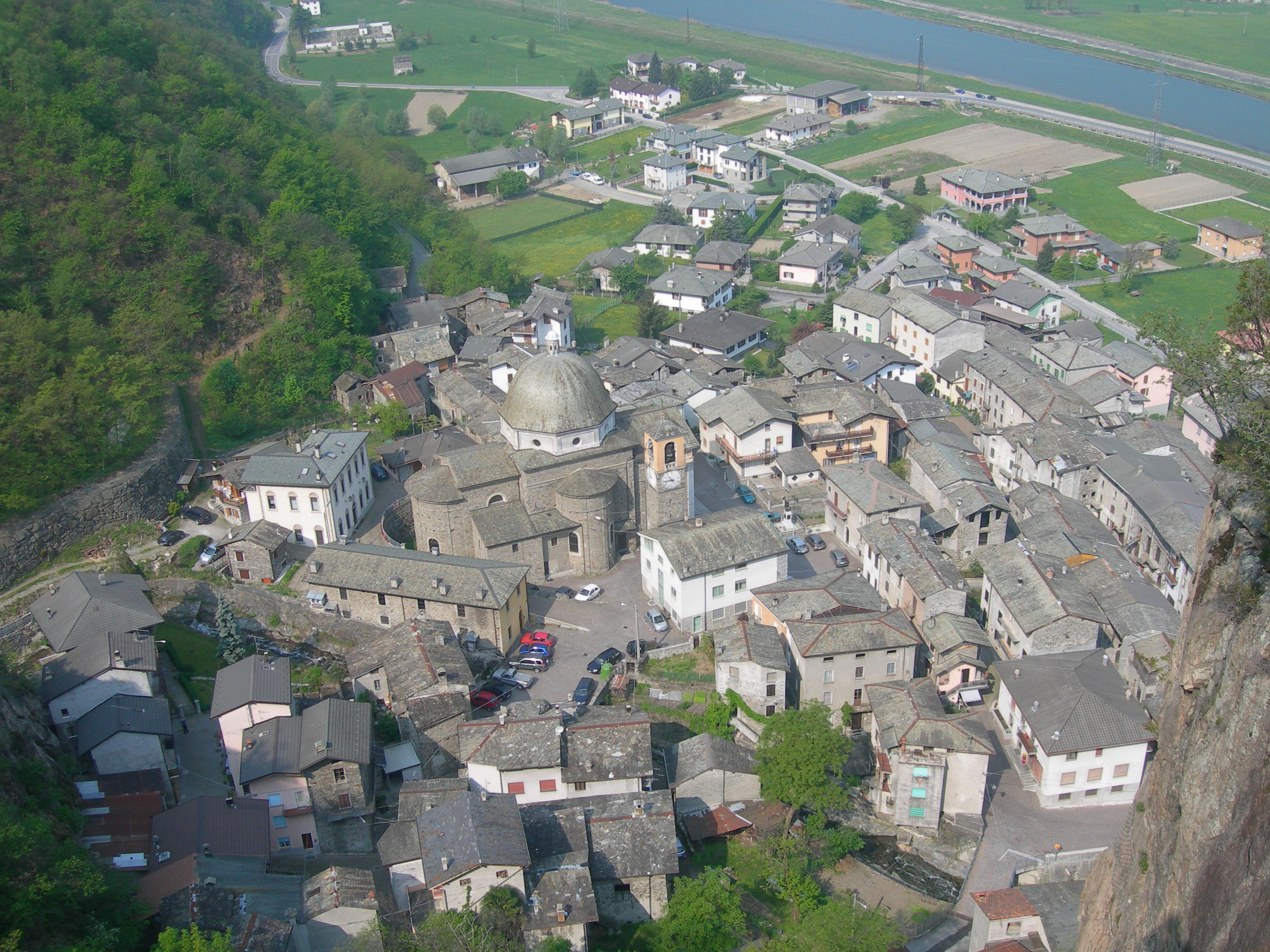

- Location within Italy Location within Lombardy
- Coordinates: 46°9′N 9°40′E
- Country: Italy
- Region: Lombardy
- Province: Province of Sondrio (SO)

Area
  - Total: 15.7 km^{2} (6.1 sq mi)

Population (Dec. 2004)
  - Total: 870
  - Density: 55/km^{2} (140/sq mi)
- Time zone: UTC+1 (CET)
  - Summer (DST): UTC+2 (CEST)
- Postal code: 23010
- Dialing code: 0342

Forcola is a comune (municipality) in the Province of Sondrio in the Italian region Lombardy, located about 90 kilometres (56 mi) northeast of Milan and about 15 kilometres (9 mi) west of Sondrio. As of 31 December 2004, it had a population of 870 and an area of 15.7 square kilometres (6.1 mi^{2}).

Forcola borders the following municipalities: Ardenno, Buglio in Monte, Colorina, Fusine, Talamona, Tartano, Sirta.

== Demographic evolution ==
Historical population

Year	Pop.	±%
1861	744	—
1871	795	+6.9%
1881	914	+15.0%
1901	965	+5.6%
1911	1,169	+21.1%

Year	Pop.	±%
1921	1,208	+3.3%
1931	1,295	+7.2%
1936	1,247	−3.7%
1951	1,273	+2.1%
1961	1,252	−1.6%

Year	Pop.	±%
1971	1,112	−11.2%
1981	1,037	−6.7%
1991	953	−8.1%
2001	874	−8.3%

Source: Data from ISTAT
