= Giovanni Pietro Ligario =

Italian painter

Self-portrait (between 1710 and 1727)

Giovanni Pietro Ligario (1686–1748) was an Italian painter and architect of the late-Baroque.

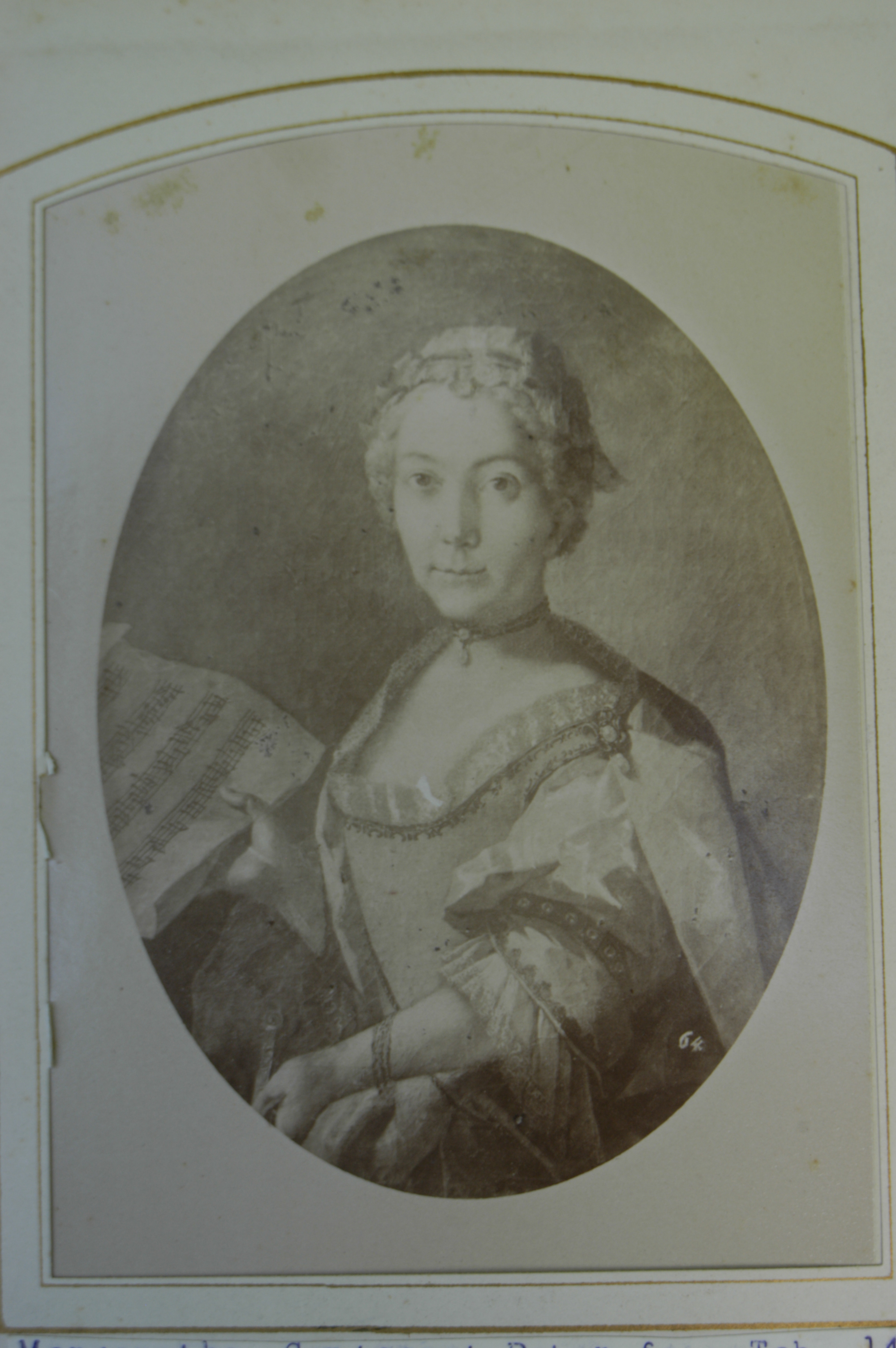
1880s photograph of a portrait by Ligario of Margaretha (1704–1765), wife of Anton de Salis-Soglio (Casa Battista) (1702–1765), Grisons Bundespraesident and Chur Stadrichter, and sister of Jerome, 2nd Count de Salis.

He was born at Ardenno province of Sondrio in the Valtelline valley, and after early training there, moved to Rome, where he frequented the studio of Lazzaro Baldi, and afterwards visited Venice. On his return to his native town in 1727, he was employed in painting historical pictures for churches and private collections. He died at Sondrio. He has left a St. Benedict in the church of the convent at Sondrio, and a Descent of the Holy Spirit in the church of San Giovanni Battista, Morbegno.

His children, Angelo, Cesare, and Vittoria were also painters.
