= Traona =

- Comune
- Comune di Traona
- Location within Italy Location within Lombardy
- Coordinates: 46°9′N 9°31′E
- Country: Italy
- Region: Lombardy
- Province: Province of Sondrio (SO)

Area
  - Total: 6.2 km^{2} (2.4 sq mi)
- Elevation: 252 m (827 ft)

Population (Dec. 2004)
  - Total: 2,314
  - Density: 370/km^{2} (970/sq mi)
- Time zone: UTC+1 (CET)
  - Summer (DST): UTC+2 (CEST)
- Postal code: 23019
- Dialing code: 0342

Traona is a comune (municipality) in the Province of Sondrio in the Italian region Lombardy, located about 80 kilometres (50 mi) northeast of Milan and about 25 kilometres (16 mi) west of Sondrio. As of 31 December 2004, it had a population of 2,314 and an area of 6.2 square kilometres (2.4 mi^{2}).

Traona borders the following municipalities: Cercino, Civo, Cosio Valtellino, Mello, Morbegno, Novate Mezzola.

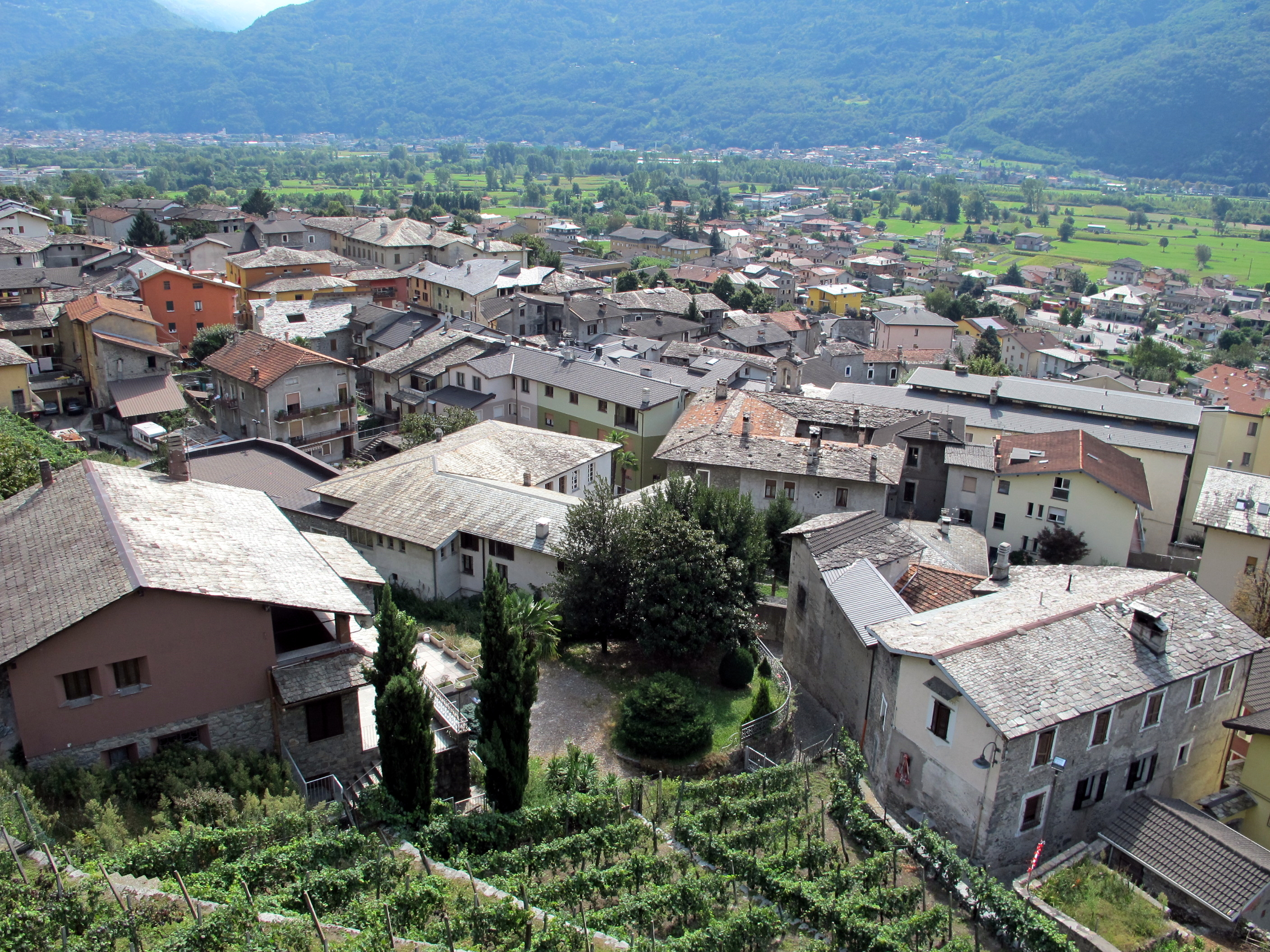
the town

== Demographic evolution ==
Historical population

Year	Pop.	±%
1861	1,164	—
1871	1,218	+4.6%
1881	1,188	−2.5%
1901	1,272	+7.1%
1911	1,239	−2.6%

Year	Pop.	±%
1921	1,341	+8.2%
1931	1,274	−5.0%
1936	1,297	+1.8%
1951	1,353	+4.3%
1961	1,422	+5.1%

Year	Pop.	±%
1971	1,578	+11.0%
1981	1,725	+9.3%
1991	1,922	+11.4%
2001	2,187	+13.8%

Source: Data from ISTAT
