= Stefano Salterio =

Italian sculptor

Stefano Salterio (1730 in Laglio – 1806) was an Italian sculptor.

== Biography ==
He worked mainly in Northern Italy and his works are on the Sacred Mountain of Domodossola, in the Church of San Lorenzo in Brescia, in St John's Collegiate in Morbegno, in the Church of San Giorgio in Laglio, in the Church of Santo Stefano in Dongo, in the church of San Giorgio martyr in Breda Cisoni di Sabbioneta. He was also the architect of the Neptune Fountain in Trento.

Facade of the Montichiari Cathedral - The statues are all by Stefano Salterio

== Notes ==
- Churches
- St. Stephen Parish - Saint Stephen
