= Cesare Ligario =

Italian painter

Cesare Ligario (1716- after 1755) was an Italian painter. He was born in Milan, the son of Giovanni Pietro Ligario. He studied at Venice under Giovanni Battista Pittoni, and afterwards with his father. His grandson, Angelo Ligari, was also a painter, who restored a painting by Pietro at the Collegiata of Sondrio.
