= Hans Ardüser (politician) =

Grisons politician (1521–1580)

- Born: 1521; Davos, Three Leagues
- Died: 16 August 1580 (aged 58–59); Davos, Three Leagues
- Occupation: Politician
- Children: Hans Ardüser

Hans Ardüser (1521 – 16 August 1580) was a politician from Davos. In 1567–1570 he was Landammann (chief magistrate) of Davos and of the League of the Ten Jurisdictions, and he was the builder of the Davos town hall, completed in 1564.

== Biography ==
Hans Ardüser was probably the son of Christen. He was the father of the painter and chronicler Hans Ardüser.

In 1556 and in 1561–1564 Ardüser was Landschreiber (clerk). In 1559 he was chief field clerk (Oberster Feldschreiber) in French service outside Calais. In 1565–1567 he was bailiff (Landvogt) in Maienfeld, and in 1567–1570 Landammann of Davos and of the League of the Ten Jurisdictions. He worked for a common inheritance law for the League and for an alliance with the cantons of the Swiss Confederacy, and he fought the purchase of offices (the Kesselbrief of 1570).

Among other buildings, Ardüser was the builder (Baumeister) of the Davos town hall (Rathaus), which was completed in 1564. Its Grosse Stube (great hall) is an early monument of the Renaissance in Switzerland.

== Bibliography ==
- M. Pfister, "Hans Ardüser, der Erbauer des Davoser Rathauses", in Davoser Revue, 68, no. 3, 1992, 11–17
