= Wynegg Castle =

Castle in Malans, Switzerland

- Burg Wynegg
- Malans
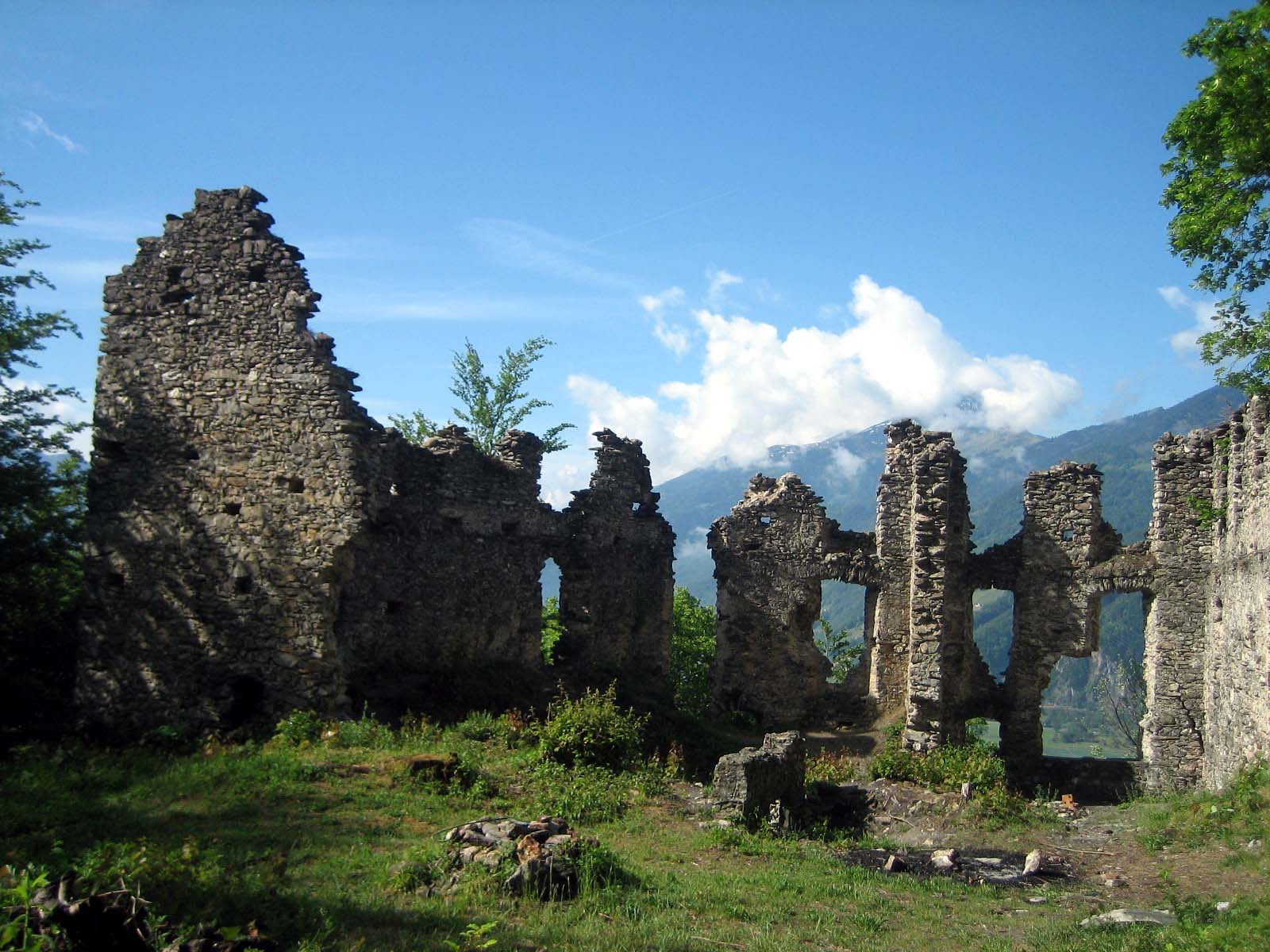

Site information
- Type: hill castle, spur castle
- Code: CH-GR
- Condition: ruin

Location
- Location within Canton of Graubünden Location within Switzerland
- Coordinates: 46°59′40″N 09°34′12″E

Site history
- Built: About 1200
- Materials: rubble stone

Wynegg Castle is a ruined castle in the municipality of Malans of the Canton of Graubünden in Switzerland.

== History ==
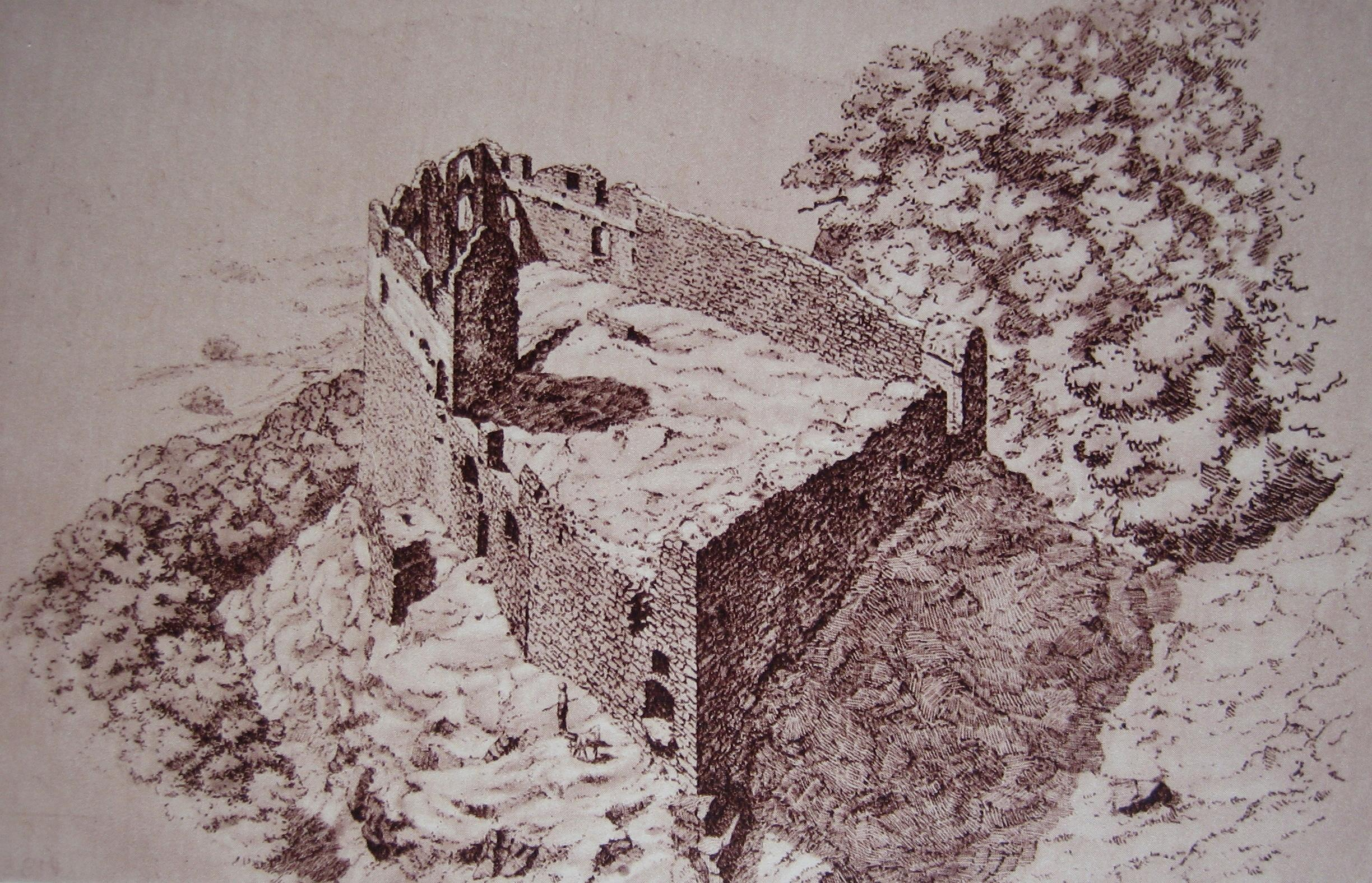
Sketch of Wynegg Castle

Wynegg castle was built in the 13th century for the Wynegg family. The first known member of the family, Ludwig von Wynegg, appears in a record in 1254. The family last appears in 1270 when Ulrich von Wynegg was mentioned. The family probably served the Bishop of Chur or the Freiherr von Vaz. After the family died out, the castle and lands were inherited by Vaz family, though the Bishop also claimed that he owned the castle. At first Johann von Vaz appeared to accept the bishop's claim, but in 1299 he went to court to prove that it was legally his fief.

Even after the extinction of the Vaz family in 1337/38 the ownership of the castle remained murky. On 6 December 1338 Count Ulrich von Montfort swore that he would return the castle to his uncle Friedrich V von Toggenburg. It is unclear why this was necessary since Friedrich should have inherited the castle through his wife, Kunigunde von Vaz. Then, on 11 December 1338 Friedrich received the castle as a fief under the authority of the Bishop of Chur. Over the following decades the Toggenburg counts held the castle, along with Schanfigg and Davos, for the bishops. In 1421 Frederick VII and the bishop quarreled and the bishop withdrew the fief. However, following arbitration through the city of Zurich, Wynegg was returned to the count. In 1436 the last Count of Toggenburg died and the estate reverted to the bishop. In 1441, it was granted to the Junker Heinrich Amsler after which it disappears from the records until 1548 when it was described as a ruin.

Around 1600 the ruin was acquired by Andreas von Salis, who built a new three-story patrician style home in the ruins. In 1602 it was inherited by the Guler von Davos family through the marriage of his daughter Margaretha. They expanded the house and by 1624 were calling themselves Guler von Wynegg. For nearly two centuries it was a country estate for the family, but around the end of the 18th century it was abandoned and allowed to decay. In 1793 the municipality of Malans purchased the abandoned castle for 2,200 gulden.

== Castle site ==
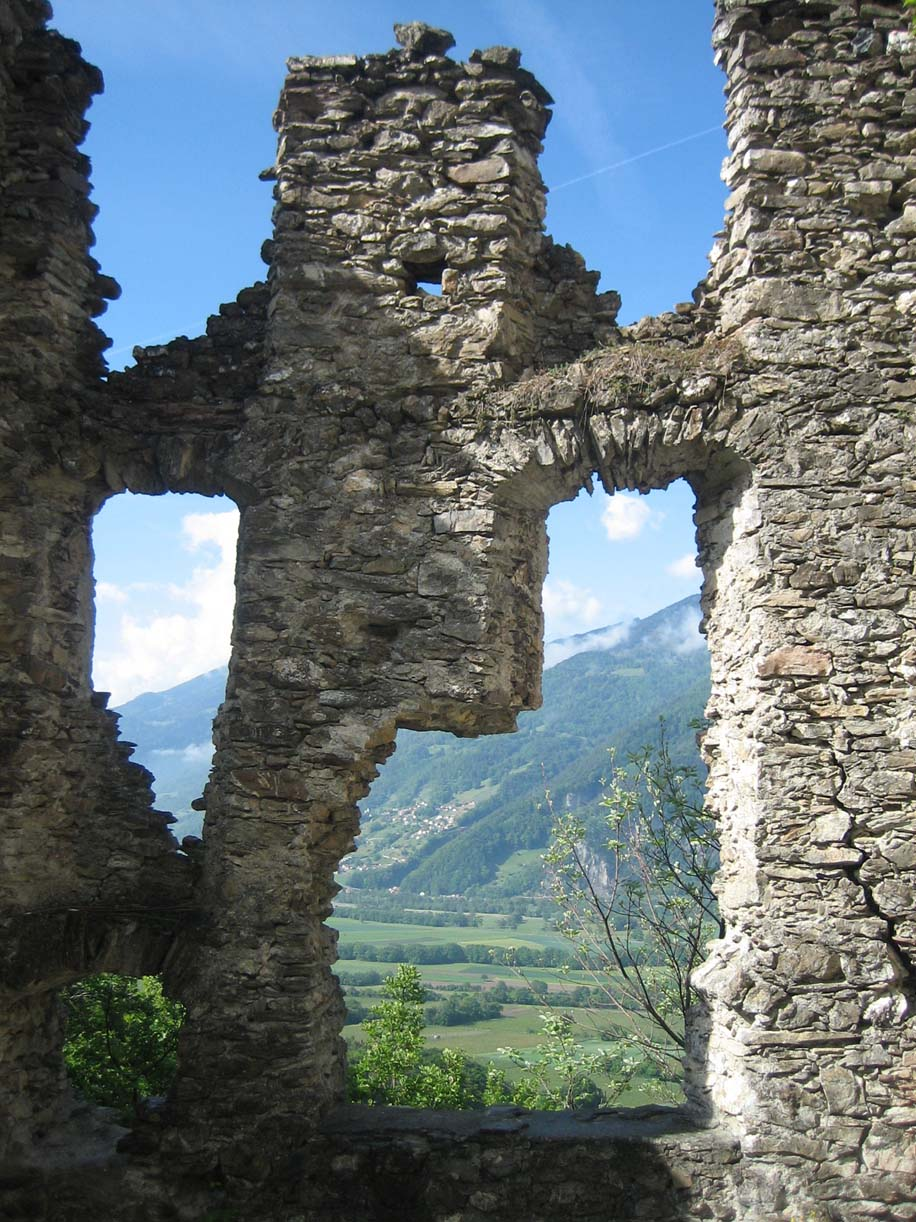
Window at Wynegg Castle

The ruins of Wynegg castle stand on a rocky outcropping north of Malans. Due to the 17th century construction, very little of the original castle still remains. Part of the old ring wall, which was up to 2.5 meters (8.2 ft), and traces of the three-story palas can still be seen. On the east side, toward the mountain, a natural depression was deepened into a defensive ditch.

== See also ==
- List of castles in Switzerland
