= Ardenno =

- Comune
- Comune di Ardenno
- Location within Italy Location within Lombardy
- Coordinates: 46°10′N 9°39′E
- Country: Italy
- Region: Lombardy
- Province: Sondrio (SO)
- Frazioni: Pioda, Biolo, Gaggio, Scheneno, Piazzalunga, Pilasco

Government
  - Mayor: Laura Bonat

Area
  - Total: 17.0 km^{2} (6.6 sq mi)
- Elevation: 266 m (873 ft)

Population (31 December 2011)
  - Total: 3,270
  - Density: 192/km^{2} (498/sq mi)
- Demonym: Ardennesi
- Time zone: UTC+1 (CET)
  - Summer (DST): UTC+2 (CEST)
- Postal code: 23011
- Dialing code: 0342
- Website: Official website

Ardenno is a comune (municipality) in the Province of Sondrio in the Italian region Lombardy, located about 90 kilometres (56 mi) northeast of Milan and about 15 kilometres (9 mi) west of Sondrio.

The municipality of Ardenno contains the frazioni (subdivisions, mainly villages and hamlets) Pioda, Biolo, Gaggio, Scheneno, Piazzalunga and Pilasco .

Ardenno borders the following municipalities: Buglio in Monte, Civo, Dazio, Forcola, Talamona, Val Masino.

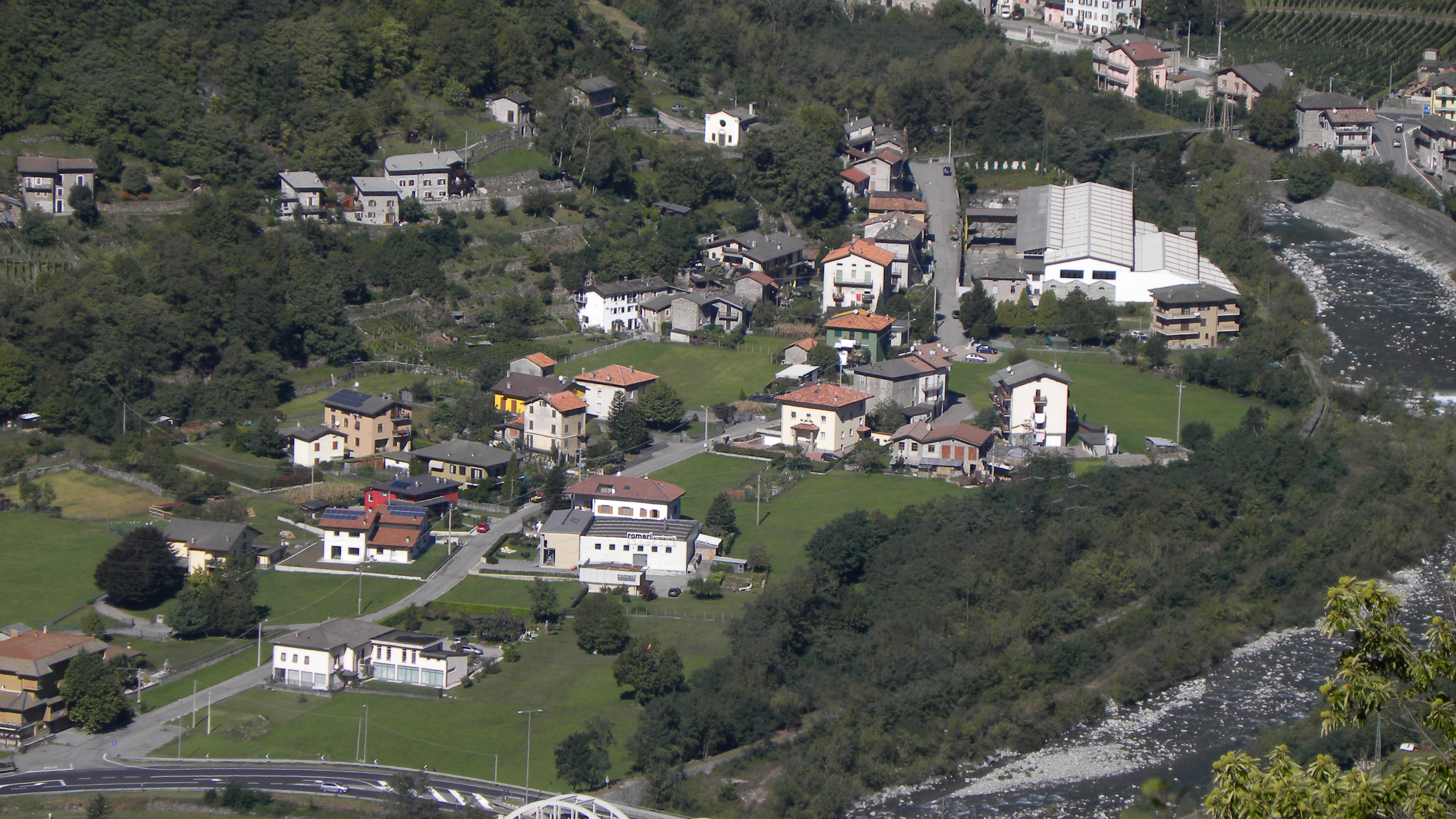
Partial view of the town

== Notable people ==
- Riccardo Innocenti (born 1943), footballer
