= Chiesa in Valmalenco =

- Comune
- Comune di Chiesa in Valmalenco
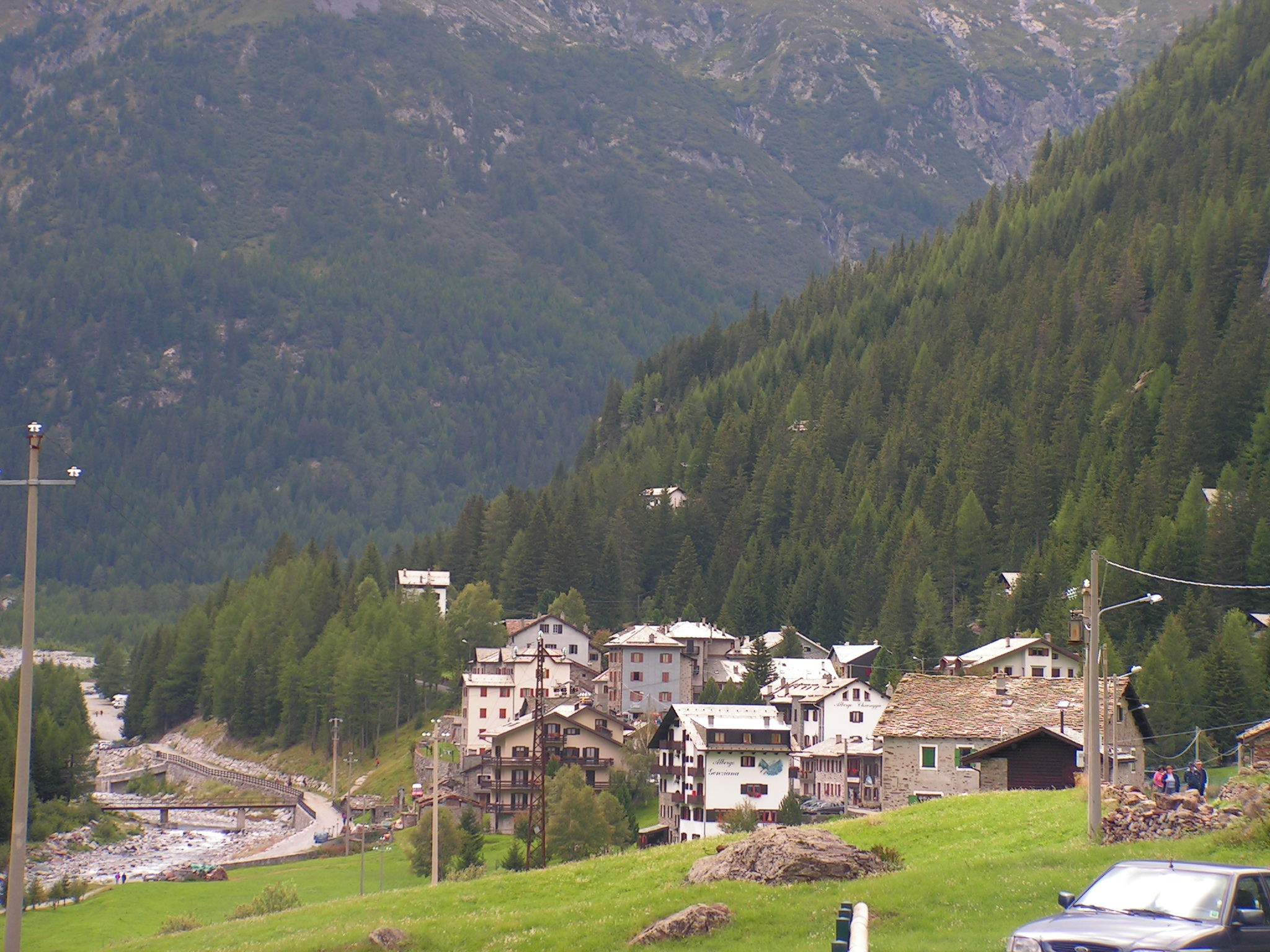
- Chiareggio in Valmalenco

- Location within Italy Location within Lombardy
- Coordinates: 46°16′N 9°51′E
- Country: Italy
- Region: Lombardy
- Province: Province of Sondrio (SO)

Area
  - Total: 114.8 km^{2} (44.3 sq mi)
- Elevation: 800 m (2,600 ft)

Population (Dec. 2004)
  - Total: 2,714
  - Density: 23.64/km^{2} (61.23/sq mi)
- Time zone: UTC+1 (CET)
  - Summer (DST): UTC+2 (CEST)
- Postal code: 23023
- Dialing code: 0342
- Website: Official website

Chiesa in Valmalenco is a comune (municipality) in the Province of Sondrio in the Italian region Lombardy, located about 100 kilometres (62 mi) northeast of Milan and about 11 kilometres (7 mi) north of Sondrio, on the border with Switzerland. The English for "Chiesa in Valmalenco" is "Church in Valmalenco": it is the most important village of the Valmalenco valley (a lateral valley of Valtellina). "Valmalenco" is a name of unsure origin. Local culture believes it originates from Celtic and Pre-Roman civilisations which share similar meanings: Celtic "Mal en ga", meaning “head pressed by water” and Pre-Roman "Mall-anko" which translates to Mountain river. The area near Chiesa in Valmalenco is famous for alpine skiing and the particular geology of the surrounding mountains. As of 31 December 2004, it had a population of 2,714 and an area of 114.8 square kilometres (44.3 mi^{2}).

Chiesa in Valmalenco borders the following municipalities: Buglio in Monte, Caspoggio, Lanzada, Sils im Engadin/Segl (Switzerland), Stampa (Switzerland), Torre di Santa Maria, Val Masino.

== Demographic evolution ==
Historical population

Year	Pop.	±%
1861	1,276	—
1871	1,453	+13.9%
1881	1,564	+7.6%
1901	1,714	+9.6%
1911	1,972	+15.1%

Year	Pop.	±%
1921	2,020	+2.4%
1931	2,198	+8.8%
1936	2,204	+0.3%
1951	2,464	+11.8%
1961	2,685	+9.0%

Year	Pop.	±%
1971	2,794	+4.1%
1981	2,836	+1.5%
1991	2,807	−1.0%
2001	2,755	−1.9%

Source: Data from ISTAT

== Images ==
The following web sites collect free photos of Chiesa in Valmalenco and other municipalities of the Valtellina area and Province of Sondrio.

The town of Chiesa in Valmalenco:

- http://www.paesidivaltellina.it/galleria_chiesa/index.htm

The mountains of Valmalenco valley surrounding Chiesa in Valmalenco:

- https://web.archive.org/web/20150623135426/http://www.paesidivaltellina.it/index2.htm#valmalenco
