= Hans Ardüser (painter) =

Painter and chronicler (1557–after 1614)

- Born: 1557; Davos, Three Leagues
- Died: after 1614 probably Thusis
- Occupations: Painter; schoolteacher; poet; chronicler
- Spouse: Menga Malet

Hans Ardüser (1557 – after 1614) was a painter, schoolteacher, poet and chronicler from Davos. He worked as an itinerant painter in summer and as a schoolteacher in winter. Of the more than one hundred murals that he mentions, about 20 survive in the Grisons.

== Biography ==
Hans Ardüser was the son of Hans Ardüser. He married Menga Malet. He attended the Latin school in Chur, began training as a preacher (Prädikant) in Zurich, and spent short periods with the painters Moritz and Jörg (Frosch) in Feldkirch and with the Chur painter Franz Appenzäller. He was self-taught as a teacher, poet and painter.

He wrote two chronicles covering the period from 1572 to 1614, biographies (printed in 1598) and spiritual songs. His life as an itinerant painter in summer and a schoolteacher in winter can be traced from his autobiography, which runs to 1605. He died after 1614, probably in Thusis.

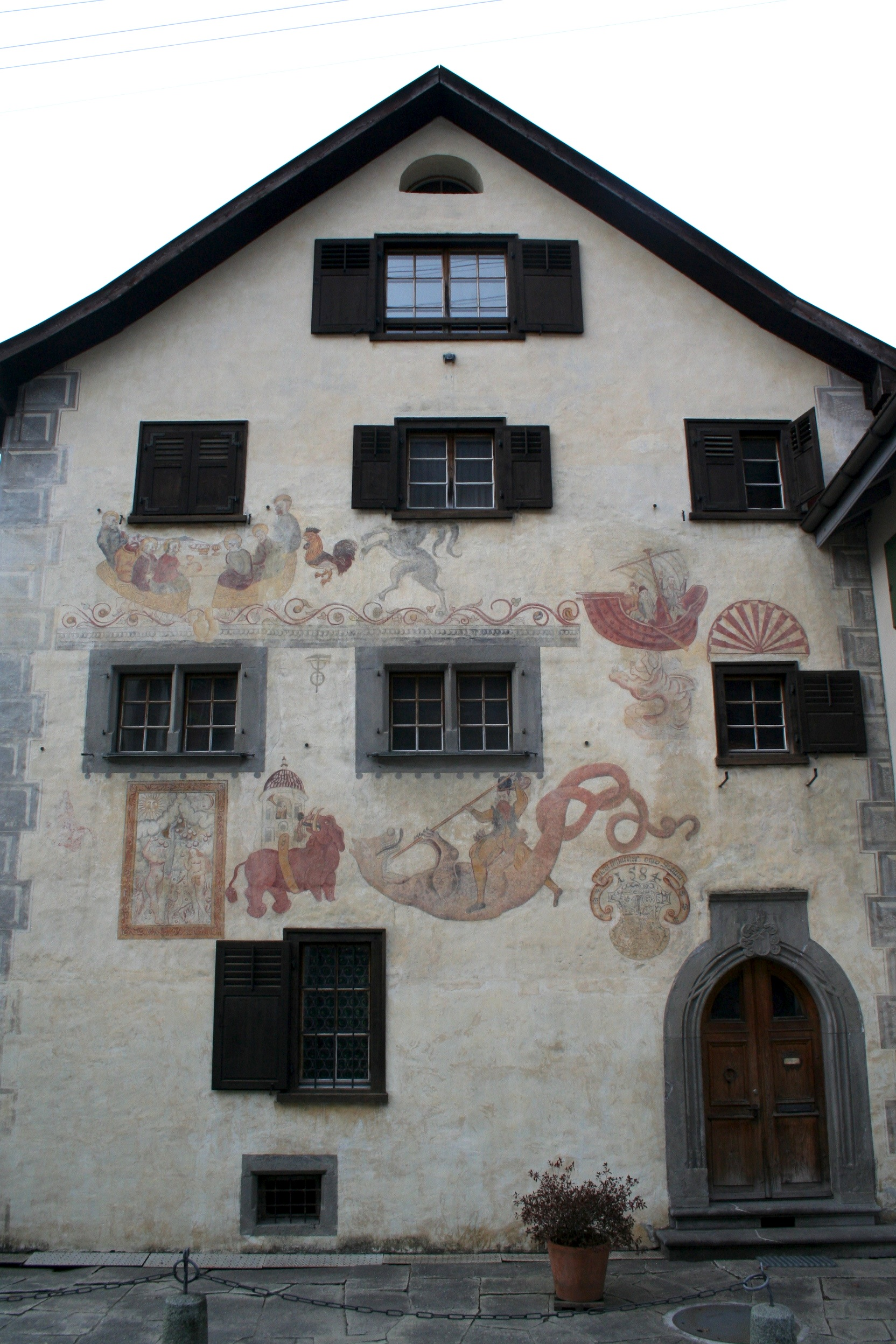
Haus Tscharner in Rothenbrunnen, painted by Ardüser in 1584

Of the more than one hundred murals that he mentions, about 20 survive in the Grisons. They are naive, popular paintings of biblical and allegorical scenes with rich architectural decoration, compiled from books and models and skillfully composed. Among them are those on the Haus Tscharner (1584) in Rothenbrunnen, the Schlössli in Parpan (1588–1591), the Catholic church of Tomils (1597), the Haus Gees (1605) in Scharans and the Haus Capol (1614) in Andeer.

== Bibliography ==
- R. Feller, E. Bonjour, Geschichtsschreibung der Schweiz vom Spätmittelalter zur Neuzeit, 1, 2nd ed., 1979, 236–237
- P. Zinsli, Der Malerpoet Hans Ardüser, 1986
- Biografisches Lexikon der Schweizer Kunst, 1998, 39–41 (with bibliography)
