= Morbegno =

Morbegno Morbegn / Murbegn (Lombard)
- Comune
- Città di Morbegno
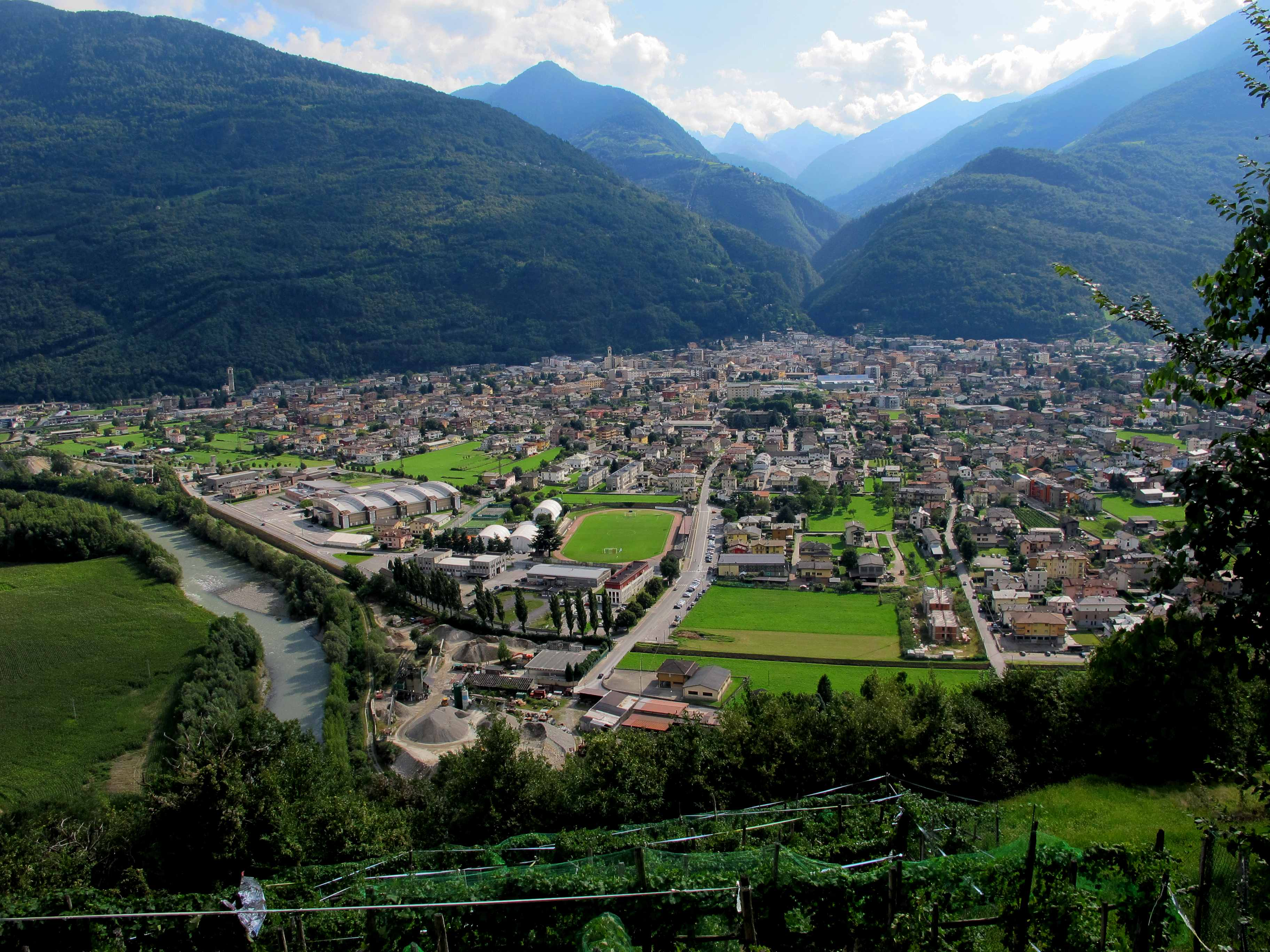

- Flag Coat of arms

- Location within Italy Location within Lombardy
- Coordinates: 46°08′N 9°34′E
- Country: Italy
- Region: Lombardy
- Province: Sondrio (SO)
- Frazioni: Campo Erbolo, Campovico, Desco, Paniga, Valle, Categno, Cermeledo, Arzo, Cerido. Localities: La Corte, Campione.

Government
  - Mayor: Andrea Ruggeri (CambiaMorbegno (civic list))

Area
  - Total: 14.82 km^{2} (5.72 sq mi)
- Elevation: 262 m (860 ft)

Population (Mar. 31, 2016)
  - Total: 12,214
  - Density: 824.2/km^{2} (2,135/sq mi)
- Demonym: Morbegnesi
- Time zone: UTC+1 (CET)
  - Summer (DST): UTC+2 (CEST)
- Postal code: 23017
- Dialing code: 0342
- Patron saint: Saints Peter and Paul
- Saint day: June 29
- Website: Official website

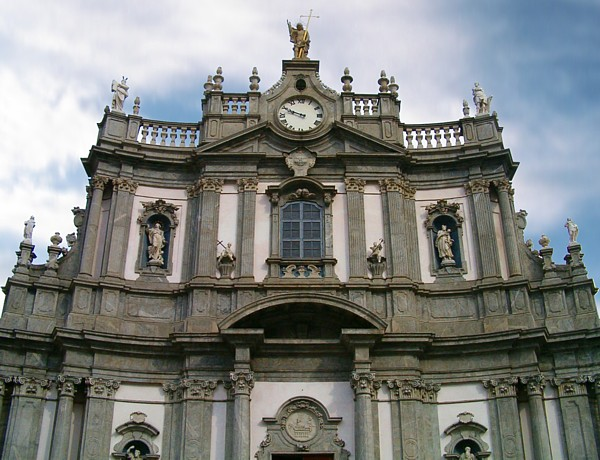
Façade of the church of San Giovanni Battista.

Morbegno (Italian: [morˈbeɲɲo]; Lombard: Morbegn [murˈbɛɲ] or Murbegn [myrˈbɛɲ]; German: Morbend) is a little town in the low Valtellina Valley in Italy, on the left side of the Adda river. It is part of the province of Sondrio of Lombardy.

Given its proximity to the San Marco Pass, which connects the Valtellina with the Val Brembana, it played an important role in the past as a passage for trade and transport to and from northern Europe.

In 2007, it started a project to become a leader in sustainability, by involving the population in a participatory design process, presently labelled "Morbegno 2020". Morbegno is partnering with the international non-profit organization The Natural Step to design a vision of what the people living in Morbegno want to create in the long term, and choose the strategic path to move towards the vision from the present reality.

Morbegno has also been selected as a pilot city in the Di.Mo.Stra. project, by the Association of Italian Municipalities for the diffusion of Strategic Planning models. Finally, on November 21, 1966, it received the honorary title of town with a presidential decree.

== Twin cities ==
- Llanberis, Wales
