= Lago di Mezzola =

Lake in Lombardy, Italy

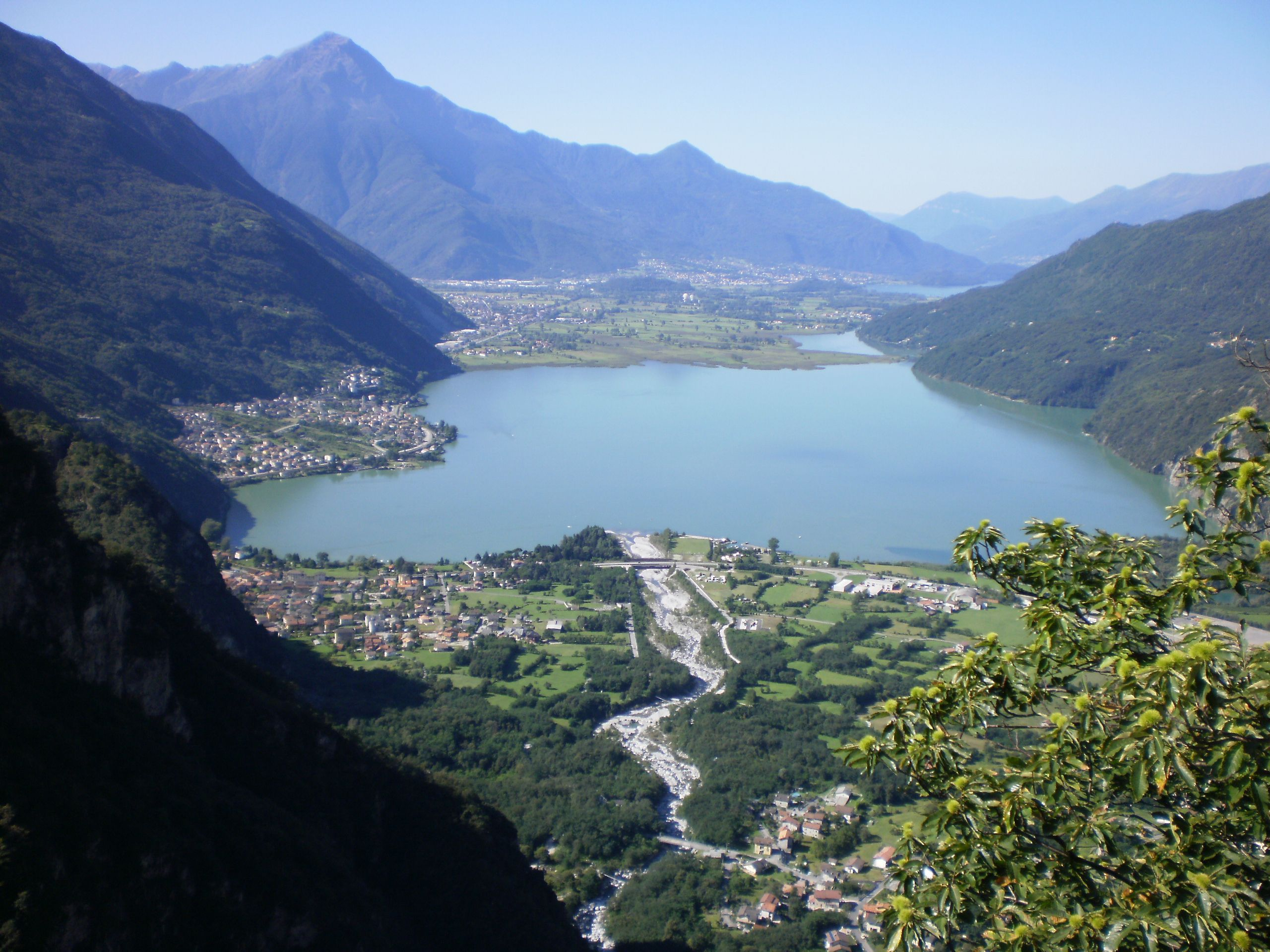

- Location within Lombardy
- Location: Provinces of Como and Sondrio, Lombardy, Italy
- Coordinates: 46°12′1.83″N 9°26′27.72″E
- Primary inflows: Mera, Codera, Ratti
- Primary outflows: Mera
- Basin countries: Italy, Switzerland
- Surface area: 5.9 km^{2} (2.3 sq mi)
- Max. depth: 69 m (226 ft)
- Shore length^{1}: 13.6 km (8.5 mi)
- Surface elevation: 200 m (660 ft)
- Settlements: Novate Mezzola (SO), Verceia (SO), Sorico (CO)

Ramsar Wetland
- Official name: Pian di Spagna - Lago di Mezzola
- Designated: 14 December 1976
- Reference no.: 117
- ^{1} Shore length is not a well-defined measure.

The Lago di Mezzola is a small lake in the Italian region of Lombardy, measuring 5.9 km^{2} (2.3 sq mi).

== Geography ==
It lies between the Pian di Spagna to the south, which divides it from Lake Como and is an ecologically important wetland habitat, and the Piano di Chiavenna to the north, which leads up to Chiavenna. Both are crossed by the river Mera which is Lago di Mezzola's most important inflow, as well as its sole outflow, and which connects it to Lake Como. The lake has two further inflows, the Codera, which runs through the Val Codera before entering the lake at Novate Mezzola, and the Ratti which runs through the Valle dei Ratti and enters the lake a little to the south at Verceia. The Lago di Mezzola and the Pian di Spagna together make up the Riserva Naturale Pian di Spagna e Lago di Mezzola.

Formerly this area was part of the northern branch of Lake Como, which extended as far north as Samolaco, known in antiquity as Summus Lacus (Latin for "Head of the Lake"). Subsequently, the frequent flooding of the Adda deposited alluvium and formed the Pian di Spagna, thus separating the two lakes.

The lakeside settlements include Novate Mezzola to the north, Verceia, San Fedele and Bocca d'Adda (once the mouth of the Adda) on the eastern shore, and Dascio and Albonico, (both frazioni of the commune of Sorico) to the west. The 10th-century lakeside Tempietto di San Fedelino, is near the northern shore.

== Fauna ==
The many fish in the lake include pike, perch, tench, carp and rudd.
