= Fort Fuentes =

- Forte di Fuentes
- Trivio di Fuentes; Near Colico in Lombardy, Italy
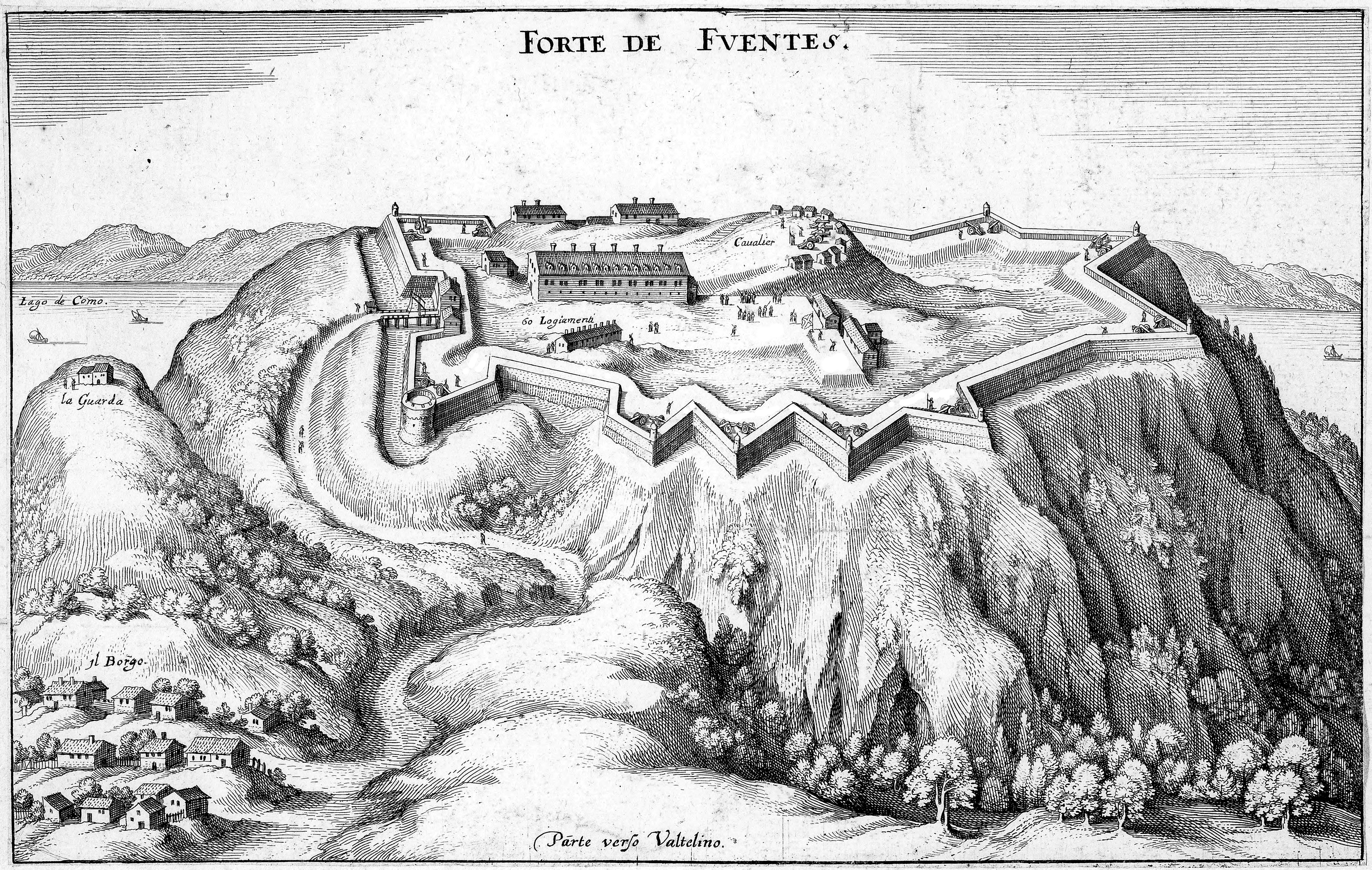
- Seventeenth-century print of the fort seen from the Valtellina, with Lake Como behind

Site information
- Type: Fortress
- Owner: Province of Lecco
- Operator: Museo della Guerra Bianca in Adamello
- Open to the public: yes
- Condition: ruined
- Website: fortedifuentes.it

Location
- Coordinates: 46.1479°N 9.404°E

Site history
- Built: circa 1603
- In use: 1782
- Fate: mostly demolished

Fort Fuentes (Italian: Forte di Fuentes) is a former military fort on the hill of Montecchio or Monteggiolo near Colico, in the province of Lecco, Lombardy, northern Italy.

It was built by the Spanish governor of Milan, Don Pedro Enríquez de Acevedo, Count of Fuentes, to command the Pian di Spagna and the strategic Trivio di Fuentes, the crossroads between the Valtellina, the Valchiavenna and the Alto Lario, in order to defend the northern border of the Spanish domain against the Grisons to the north. Construction was begun in 1603 or October 1609 under military architect Gabrio Brusca, and was substantially complete within three years. Ancillary fortified structures were the tower of Sorico, the Torretta del Passo, the Fortino d'Adda, the Torrino di Borgofrancone, the Torretta di Curcio and the tower of Fontanedo. Like the city of Milan, the fort of Fuentes yielded in 1706 to Prince Eugène of Savoy, ending Spanish control of the area. It is thought that the Samolaco horse derives in part from Spanish stock abandoned by the garrisons of these fortifications.

The fort was visited in 1769 by the Emperor Joseph II (r. 1765–1790), who declared it militarily useless. It was decommissioned in 1782, and the hill auctioned to a private buyer. The fortress was largely demolished in 1796 by general François Rambeaud on the orders of Napoleon and at the request of the Grisons. During the 19th century the ruins became the refuge of groups of bandits which the Austrian gendarmerie was unable to dislodge.

From 1911 until 1913 the Fort Montecchio-Lusardi with eight gun emplacements were constructed on the site, and the circular Spanish tower on the western side demolished at this time. The fort saw no action during the First World War.

In 1987 the entire hill, with the ruins of the fort, was acquired by the province of Como, and later passed to the province of Lecco. The Associazione Forte di Fuentes, an association for the protection of the historic site, was formed in 1998.
