= Samolaco horse =

Italian breed of horse

Samolaco
- Other names: Samolaco Horse; Chiavennese
- Country of origin: Italy
- Distribution: Province of Sondrio
- Standard: not recognised

The Samolaco is a rare breed of horse originating from the Valchiavenna and Valtellina, in Lombardy, northern Italy. It takes its name from the town of Samolaco in the province of Sondrio. Gravely endangered, it is not among the fifteen indigenous horse "breeds of limited distribution" recognised by the AIA, the Italian breeders' association. The population was listed in DAD-IS as over 12 in 1994, and under 100 in 1998; one further example of the breed may have been identified during a television broadcast.

== History ==
The Samolaco is thought to have originated from inter-breeding between indigenous animals and Spanish horses abandoned in about the seventeenth century by the garrisons of Spanish fortifications in the areas known as Trivio di Fuentes and Pian di Spagna, which were surrendered to Prince Eugène of Savoy in 1706. The FAO describes the breed as a composite of Andalusian and local populations. The horses were usually stabled during the winter and transhumed to higher alpine pasture in summer. Powerful Bruna Alpina oxen were preferred for agricultural and forestry work in the area, and the Samolaco was never widely distributed. Production of horsemeat was not economically attractive, and raising of the breed was largely abandoned. The few horses seen in the 1980s were gravely degenerated, with poorly conformed legs and heavy heads; their pale chestnut colouring may be attributed to the systematic introduction of Avelignese blood, which was at first a programme of improvement but effectively became one of outright substitution. The Samolaco is discussed in detail by Fogliata (1910):

Clivio writes: "In the province of Sondrio may be found the so-called Chiavennese breed of horse; the horses are sober, rustic, highly resistant to fatigue, hunger and bad weather. They are descended from horses abandoned by invading armies, probably the Spaniards, and are of Asiatic type. They are of medium height and size, with a rounded croup, a broad chest, a good neck and a light head. They are excellent light draught and trotting horses, and are also used for farm work. The most suitable stallion for the mares of this region is the Oriental, as the mares originally descend from this breed. The foals generally leave much to be desired, remaining small and thin-bodied because of insufficient food and being put to work early. From 1850, under the Austrian government, a number of stallions stood in the city of Sondrio, and later some were sent by the Italian government also; from all of these, but especially from the former, good horses were obtained, which were admired for their beauty and for their resistance. Before 1887 there were some private studs; in that year the state breeding stations were established, and the private ones disappeared. Not many years ago the Valtellina was an active exporter of horses, but this gradually reduced, and is now exceeded by [imports]". From this report we may understand that there is in the Valtellina a breed of oriental type, with production centred on Chiavenna, which was prosperous when it was left to itself, so that it was an important export; and that after the establishment of the state stud organisation, the situation was reversed. In fact, while director Clivio suggests that the stallion that should be sent to that station is an Oriental, the stallion that was sent there was an English Hackney. So that, assuming that that small Chiavennese breed really had notable merits, especially their outstanding suitability for hill work, they wanted to destroy those qualities with an unsuitable cross, for the Hackney is not, and can never be, a suitable sire for the horses needed on hills and on mountains. So, in contrast to the Hungarian government, which created the Fogaras breed at 700 metres above sea level in order have stallions suitable to cover the mares of the mountains, we send to the Alpine slopes the same stallion that we use in the low lush meadows of the plains of Lombardy! But perhaps more attention should be paid to what was said by Prof. Lemoigne in the conferences he held in the Valtellina, which is that this province is not, and cannot be, horse country. If this is true, however, one wonders for what purpose a government horse breeding station was established there.

— Giacinto Fogliata, Tipi e razze equine in Rapporto con la produzione equina in Italia, con l'aggiunta della produzione del mulo. Seconda edizione, migliorata e notevolmente accresciuta.
