= Tempietto di San Fedelino sul Lago Mezzola =

Church in Sorico, Italy

Coordinates: 46°12′53″N 9°26′23″E

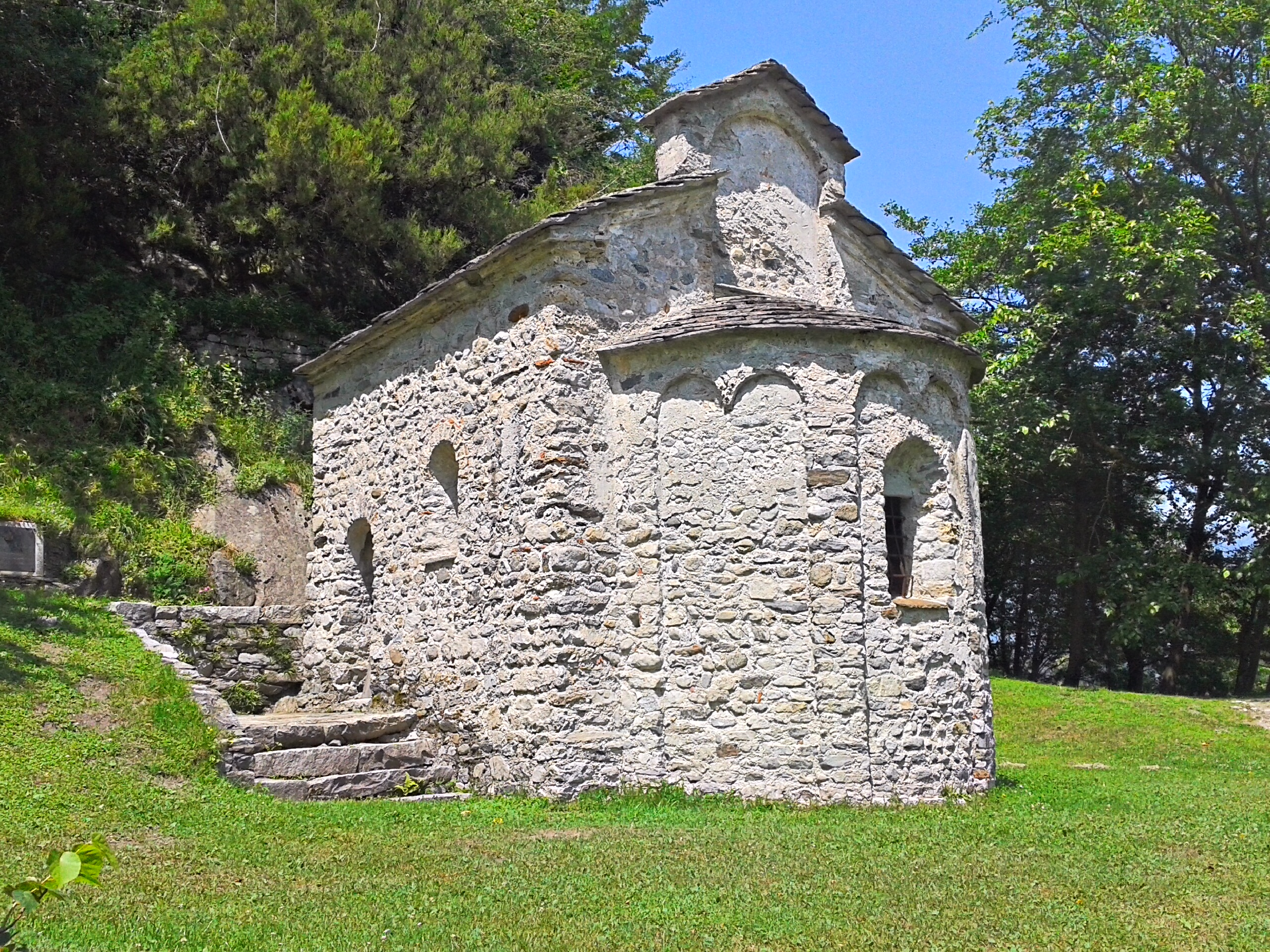
Romanesque Oratory of San Fedelino, Sorico, Como, Italy. Southeast side.

The Tempietto di San Fedelino', also known as the Oratorio di San Fedele, is a 10th to 11th-century small, Roman Catholic sanctuary or church, located in a remote rural site Via San Fedelino near Novate Mezzola, at the south shore of the River Mera where it feeds Lake Mezzola, province of Sondrio, region of Lombardy, Italy. The small church is made of local stone and has a rounded apse. It still retains some 11th-century frescoes. The frescoes resemble those from the apse of the church of San Vincenzo in Galliano (circa 1004–1007).
