= Vercana =

- Comune
- Comune di Vercana
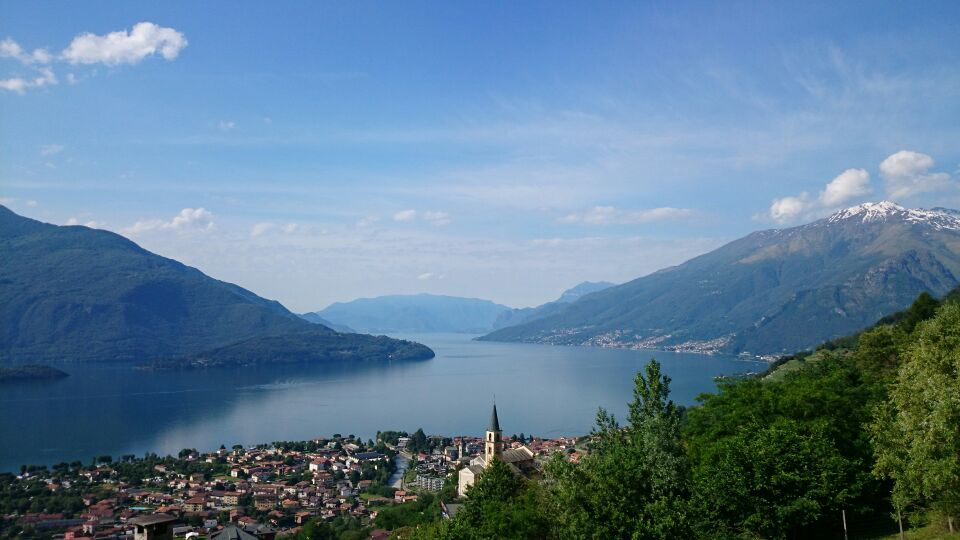
- Vercana

- Location within Italy Location within Lombardy
- Coordinates: 46°10′N 9°20′E
- Country: Italy
- Region: Lombardy
- Province: Province of Como (CO)

Area
  - Total: 14.6 km^{2} (5.6 sq mi)

Population (Dec. 2004)
  - Total: 729
  - Density: 49.9/km^{2} (129/sq mi)
- Time zone: UTC+1 (CET)
  - Summer (DST): UTC+2 (CEST)
- Postal code: 22013
- Dialing code: 0344

Vercana is a comune (municipality) in the Province of Como in the Italian region Lombardy, located about 80 kilometres (50 mi) north of Milan and about 45 kilometres (28 mi) northeast of Como. As of 31 December 2004, it had a population of 729 and an area of 14.6 square kilometres (5.6 mi^{2}).

Vercana borders the following municipalities: Colico, Domaso, Gera Lario, Livo, Montemezzo, Samolaco, Trezzone.

== Demographic evolution ==
Historical population

Year	Pop.	±%
1861	1,033	—
1871	1,003	−2.9%
1881	988	−1.5%
1901	788	−20.2%
1911	1,017	+29.1%

Year	Pop.	±%
1921	788	−22.5%
1931	740	−6.1%
1936	756	+2.2%
1951	709	−6.2%
1961	710	+0.1%

Year	Pop.	±%
1971	717	+1.0%
1981	676	−5.7%
1991	689	+1.9%
2001	730	+6.0%

Source: Data from ISTAT
