= Fiorenzo Bongiasca =

Italian politician (born 1960)

President of the Province of Como
- Incumbent
- Assumed office 2 November 2018
- Preceded by: Maria Rita Livio

Mayor of Trezzone
- Incumbent
- Assumed office 4 October 2021

Mayor of Gravedona ed Uniti
- In office 16 May 2011 – 4 October 2021

Mayor of Gravedona
- In office 14 May 2001 – 10 February 2011

Personal details
- Born: 23 July 1960 (age 66) Gravedona, Province of Como, Italy
- Occupation: Entrepreneur

Fiorenzo Bongiasca (born 23 July 1960) is an Italian politician serving as president of the Province of Como since 2018. He has served as mayor of Trezzone since 2021.

== Career ==
Bongiasca was elected to the municipal council of Gravedona in 1988 with the Christian Democracy and subsequently served as a municipal assessor. He served as mayor of Gravedona from 2001 to 2011, overseeing its merger into the newly established municipality of Gravedona ed Uniti, of which he served as mayor until 2021. In 2021, he was elected mayor of Trezzone.

In October 2018, Bongiasca, supported by the centre-left coalition, was elected president of the Province of Como with 33,740 weighted votes (50.05%), narrowly defeating centre-right candidate Pierluigi Mascetti. He was re-elected in 2022, with the support of a broad cross-party coalition.
