= Olgiasca =

- Frazione
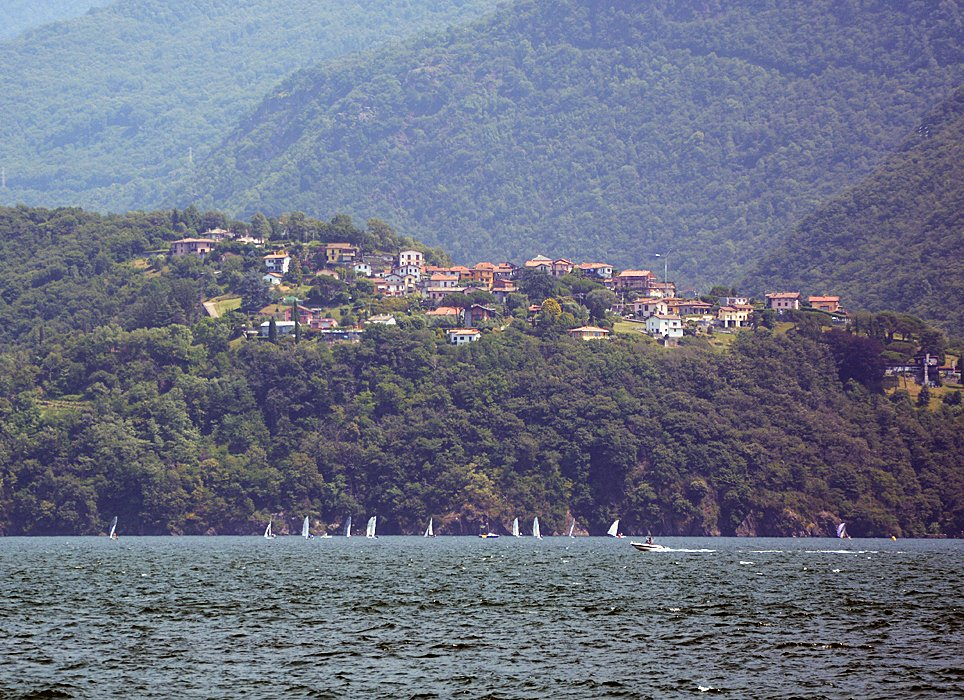
- Olgiasca

- Location of Olgiasca in Italy
- Country: Italy
- Region: Lombardy
- Province: Province of Lecco
- Comune: Colico
- Time zone: UTC+1 (CET)
  - Summer (DST): UTC+2 (CEST)
- Postal code: 23823
- Dialing code: 0341
- Patron saint: Saint Philip

Olgiasca is a frazione of the comune of Colico (Province of Lecco), northern Italy. It is located in the eponymous peninsula on the northern eastern shore of the Lake Como.

A manse, consisting of the hill of Olgiasca in 1241 was leased from the church of St. Vincent by Gravedona to Piona Abbey. There was an intense agricultural activity.

In the 14th century was built the "Castel Mirabei", while in 17th century Olgiasca lost its autonomy and became part of Colico.

== Sources ==
- Del Tredici, Giovanni; Elena Fattarelli (2007). Colico e il Monte Legnone – Sentieri e Storia. CAI Colico.

== See also ==
- Colico
- Villatico
- Curcio
- Laghetto
