= Riserva Naturale Pian di Spagna e Lago di Mezzola =

Nature reserve in Lombardy, Italy

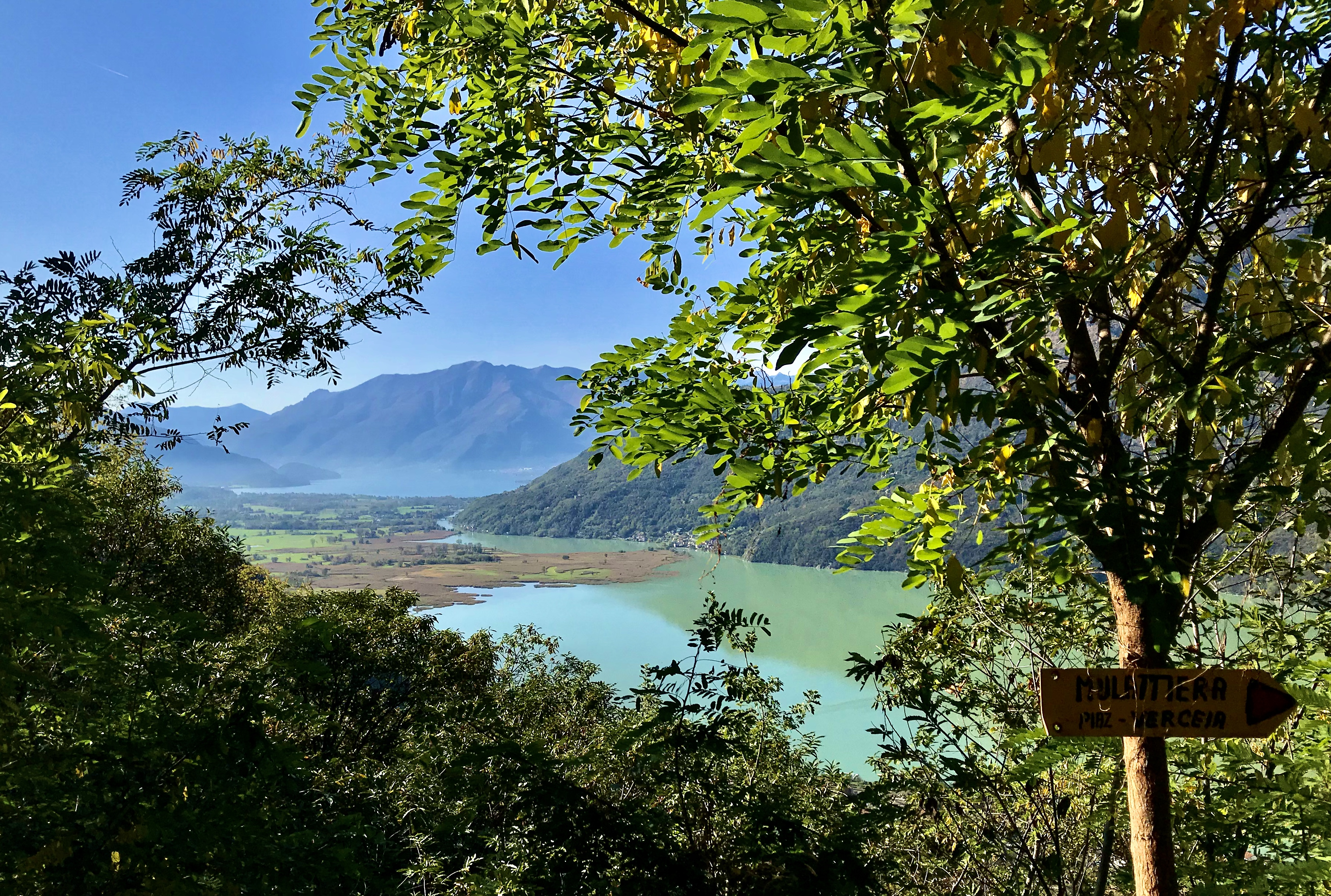
- Interactive map of Riserva Naturale Pian di Spagna e Lago di Mezzola
- Coordinates: 46°11′N 9°26′E
- Area: 1,586.40 ha (6.1251 sq mi)
- Established: 1985

The Riserva Naturale Pian di Spagna e Lago di Mezzola is a nature reserve in Lombardy, in northern Italy. The reserve consists of the Lago di Mezzola and the Pian di Spagna, the wetland area which separates it from Lake Como. It includes parts of the comuni of Sorico and Gera Lario in the province of Como, and of the comuni of Dubino, Verceia and Novate Mezzola in the province of Sondrio. It was established by Deliberazione del Consiglio Regionale III/1913, dated 6 February 1985, and has the EUAP reference code EUAP0326.

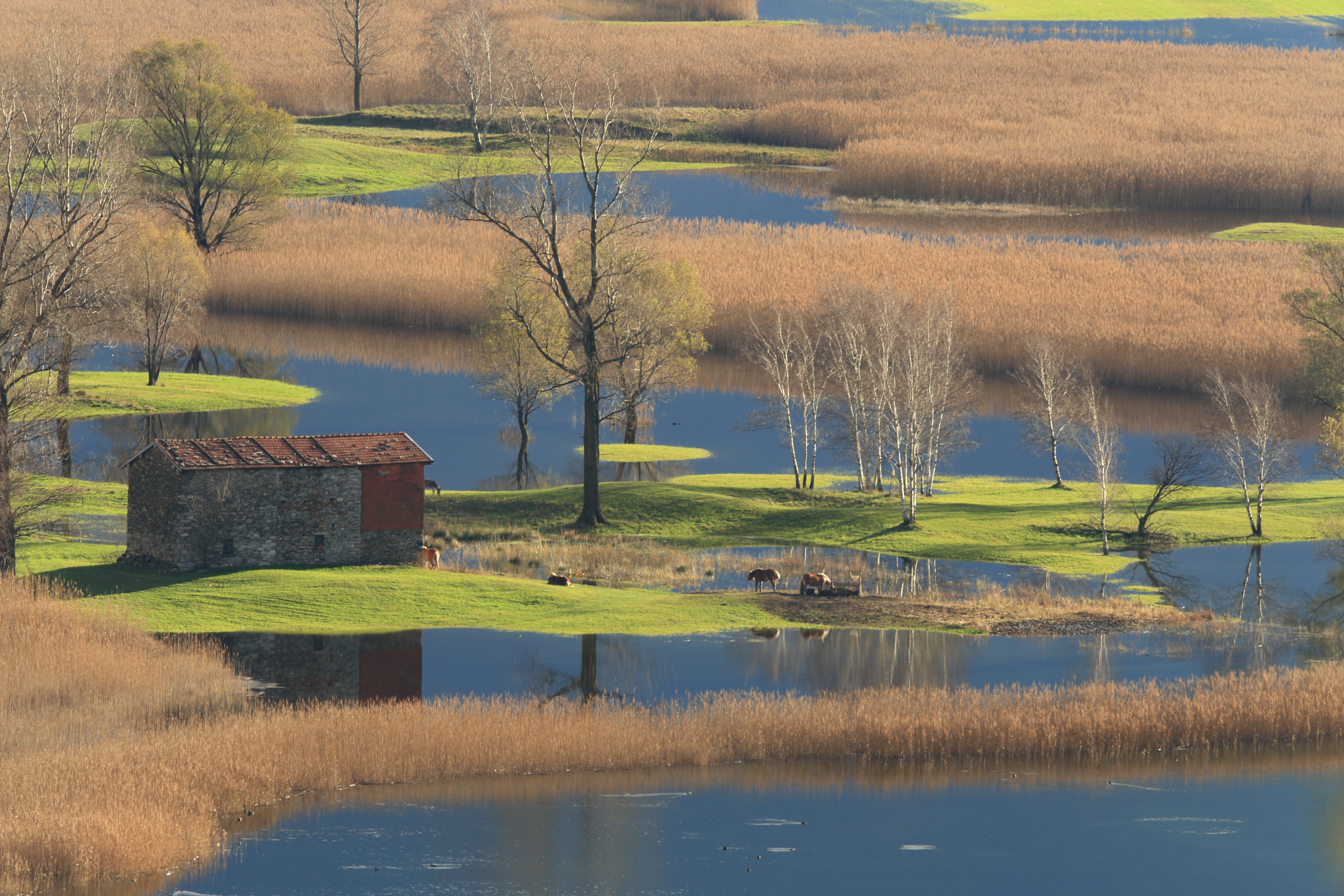
High water in the Pian di Spagna

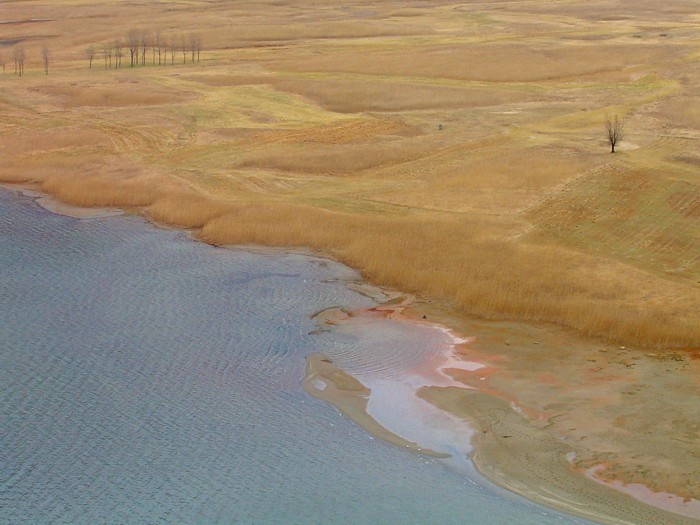
Aerial view of the Pian di Spagna and Lake Como

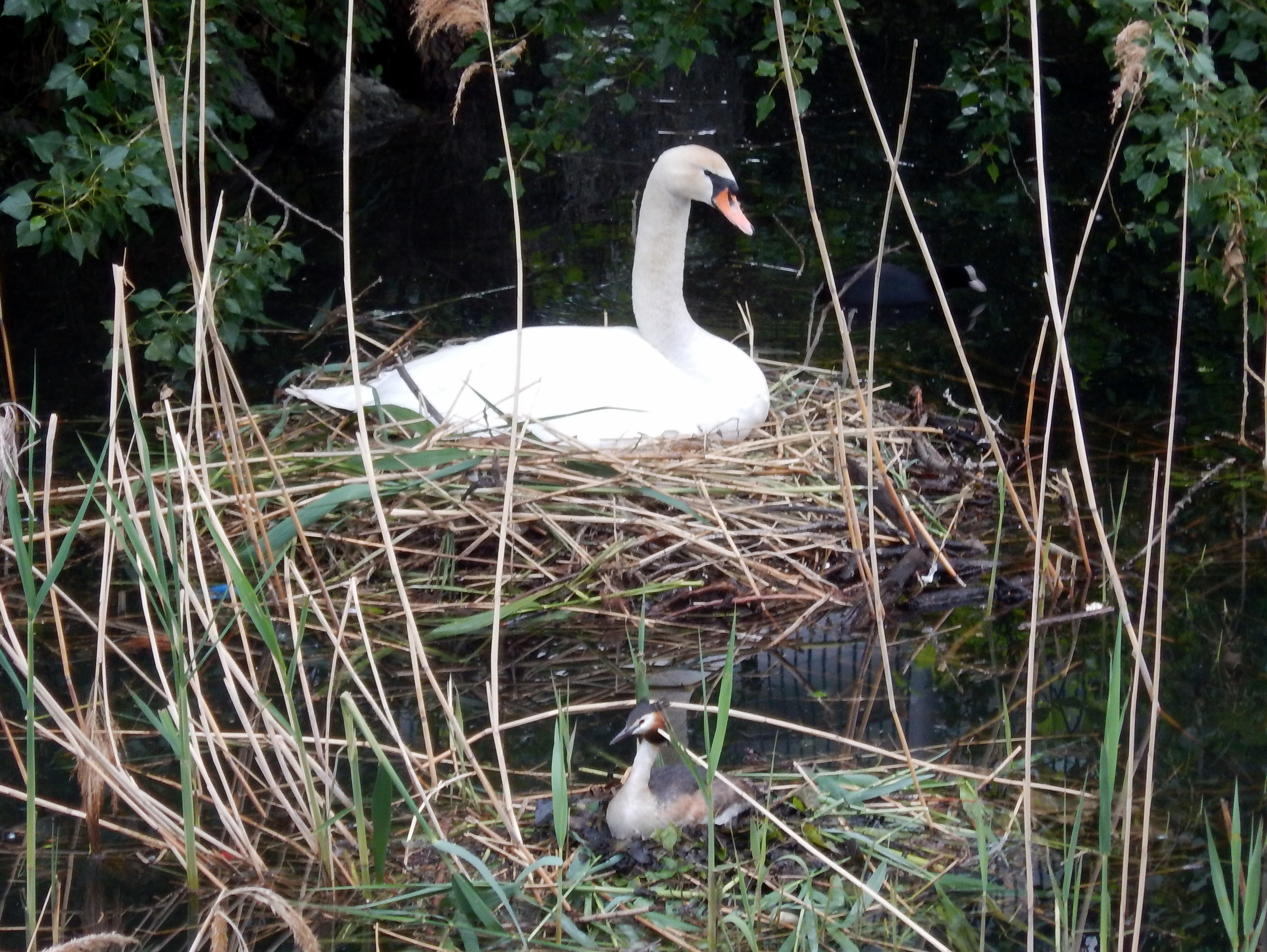
