= Montemezzo =

Montemezzo Montemezz (Lombard)
- Comune
- Comune di Montemezzo
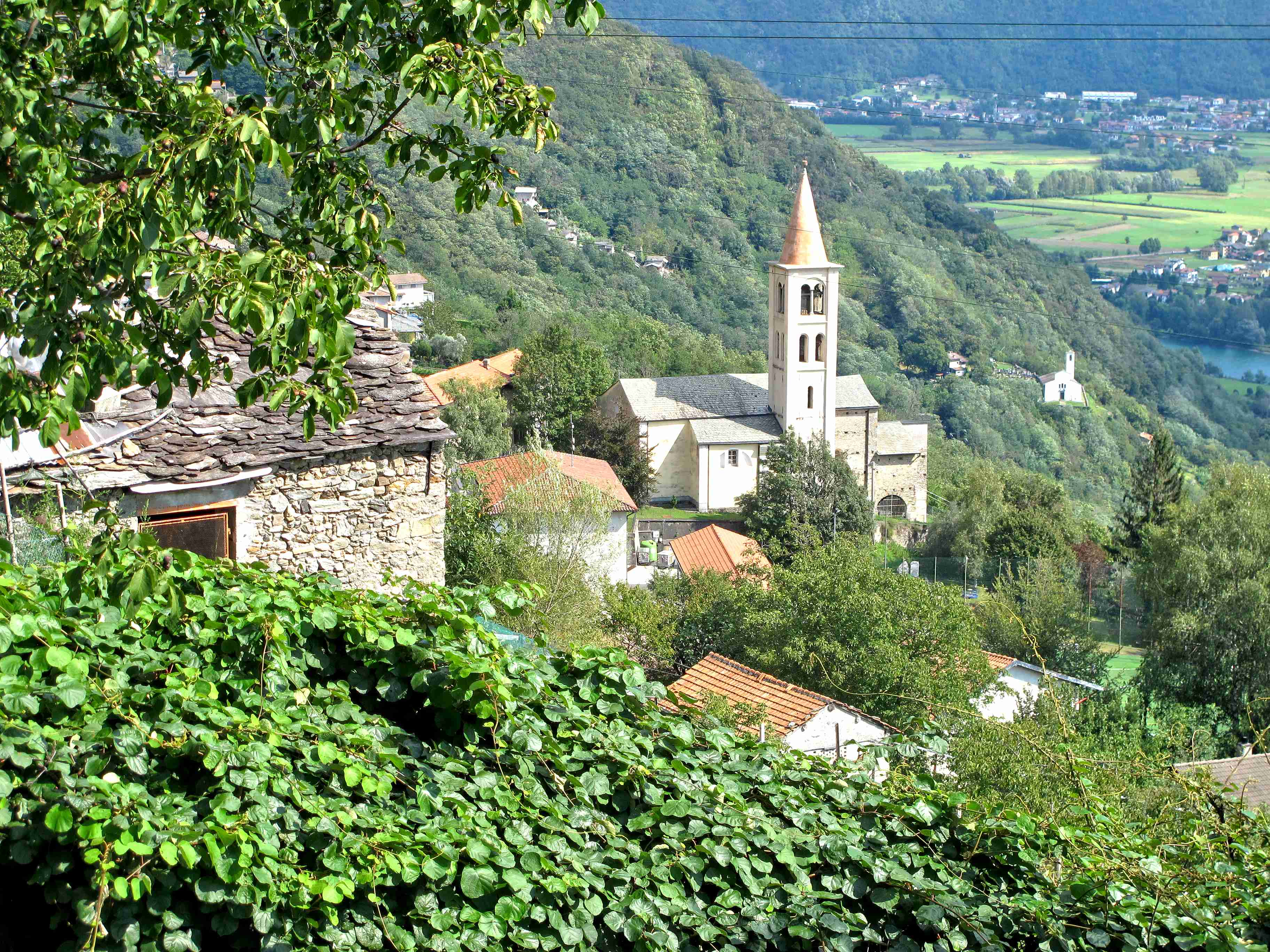

- Location within Italy Location within Lombardy
- Coordinates: 46°11′N 9°23′E
- Country: Italy
- Region: Lombardy
- Province: Province of Como (CO)

Area
  - Total: 9.1 km^{2} (3.5 sq mi)

Population (Dec. 2004)
  - Total: 270
  - Density: 30/km^{2} (77/sq mi)
- Time zone: UTC+1 (CET)
  - Summer (DST): UTC+2 (CEST)
- Postal code: 22010
- Dialing code: 0344

Montemezzo (Comasco: Montemezz [mũteˈmɛts]) is a comune (municipality) in the Province of Como in the Italian region Lombardy, located about 80 kilometres (50 mi) north of Milan and about 45 kilometres (28 mi) northeast of Como. As of 31 December 2004, it had a population of 270 and an area of 9.1 km^{2} (3.5 sq mi).

Montemezzo borders the following municipalities: Gera Lario, Samolaco, Sorico, Trezzone, Vercana.

== Demographic evolution ==
Historical population

Year	Pop.	±%
1861	471	—
1871	476	+1.1%
1881	466	−2.1%
1901	323	−30.7%
1911	357	+10.5%

Year	Pop.	±%
1921	368	+3.1%
1931	359	−2.4%
1936	354	−1.4%
1951	362	+2.3%
1961	338	−6.6%

Year	Pop.	±%
1971	317	−6.2%
1981	302	−4.7%
1991	324	+7.3%
2001	287	−11.4%

Source: Data from ISTAT
