= Fort Montecchio-Lusardi =

Coordinates: 46°08′37″N 9°22′54″E

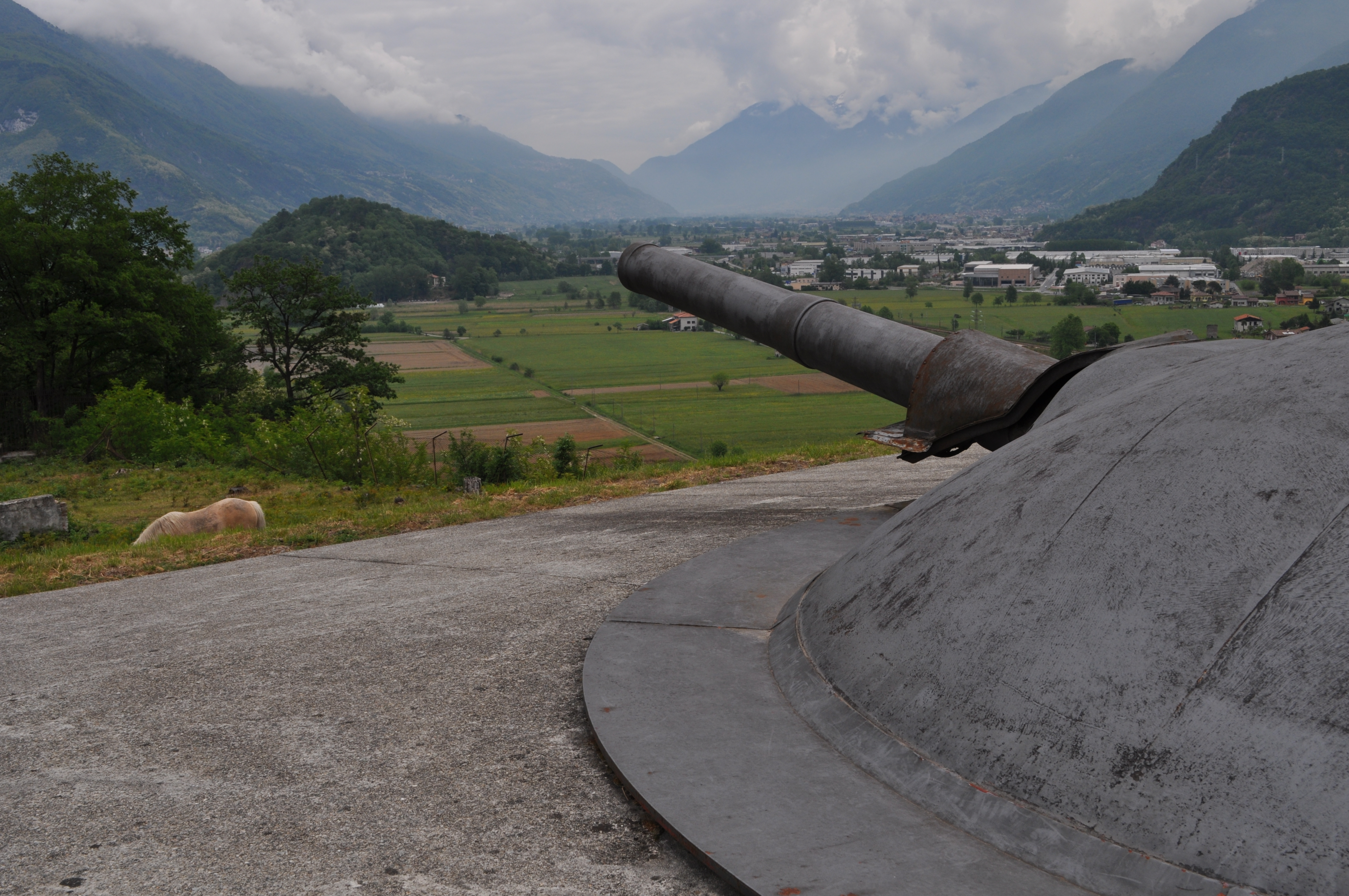
One of the French 149 mm guns in the fort.

Fort Montecchio-Lusardi is a military fort situated in Colico, in the province of Lecco, northern Italy. It was built between 1911 and 1914.

It is the only Italian fort from World War I which has been preserved intact with its original weapons. The main function of the fort was to control the roads of Spluga, Maloja and Stelvio, in case the Central Powers decided to invade northern Italy, violating the neutrality of Switzerland.

The fort was one of the strongholds in a complex barrier system which extended up to Monte Legnone, though it remained inactive throughout the World War. During World War II the fort also never entered a major action: the only gunshots were fired after the fort was occupied by the partisans, at a German column that marched along the opposite bank of the lake. However, in 1944/1945, the fort figured in the Italian fascist regime’s planning for a Ridotto Alpino Repubblicano, or Alpine redoubt in the Valtellina, to make a last stand against the Allied advance.

The fort was later used as a weapons depot.

Attractions in the fort include four French 149 mm guns, with a range of 14 km, each rotating inside a cast-iron dome. The fort is divided into two parts: the lower area contains housing and powder magazines, and the upper part contains guns. The two areas are linked by a curved gallery.

== See also ==
- Fort Fuentes
- Colico
