= Maria Rita Livio =

Italian politician (born 1950)

President of the Province of Como
- In office 13 October 2014 – 2 November 2018
- Preceded by: Leonardo Carioni
- Succeeded by: Fiorenzo Bongiasca

Mayor of Olgiate Comasco
- In office 16 May 2011 – 6 June 2016
- In office 14 May 2001 – 30 May 2006

Personal details
- Born: 12 November 1950 (age 75) Como, Italy
- Party: Democratic Party
- Occupation: Teacher

Maria Rita Livio (born 12 November 1950) is an Italian politician who served as president of the Province of Como from 2014 to 2018.

== Life and career ==
Livio was born in Como in 1950 and worked as a secondary school teacher in the province of Como.

In 2001, she was elected mayor of Olgiate Comasco as a centre-left candidate, but was defeated by Roberto Bovi in the 2006 municipal election. In June 2007, she was elected to the Provincial Council of Como as a candidate of the Olive Tree coalition. She ran again for mayor of Olgiate Comasco in 2011 and was elected.

In the 2014 provincial election, Livio, supported by the Democratic Party, was elected president of the Province of Como, narrowly (50.7%) defeating Andrea Maspero, the centre-right candidate supported by Forza Italia and Lega Nord.

Livio served as municipal assessor for urban planning in Olgiate Comasco from 2016 to 2021.
