= Gera Lario =

Gera Lario Gera (Lombard)
- Comune
- Comune di Gera Lario
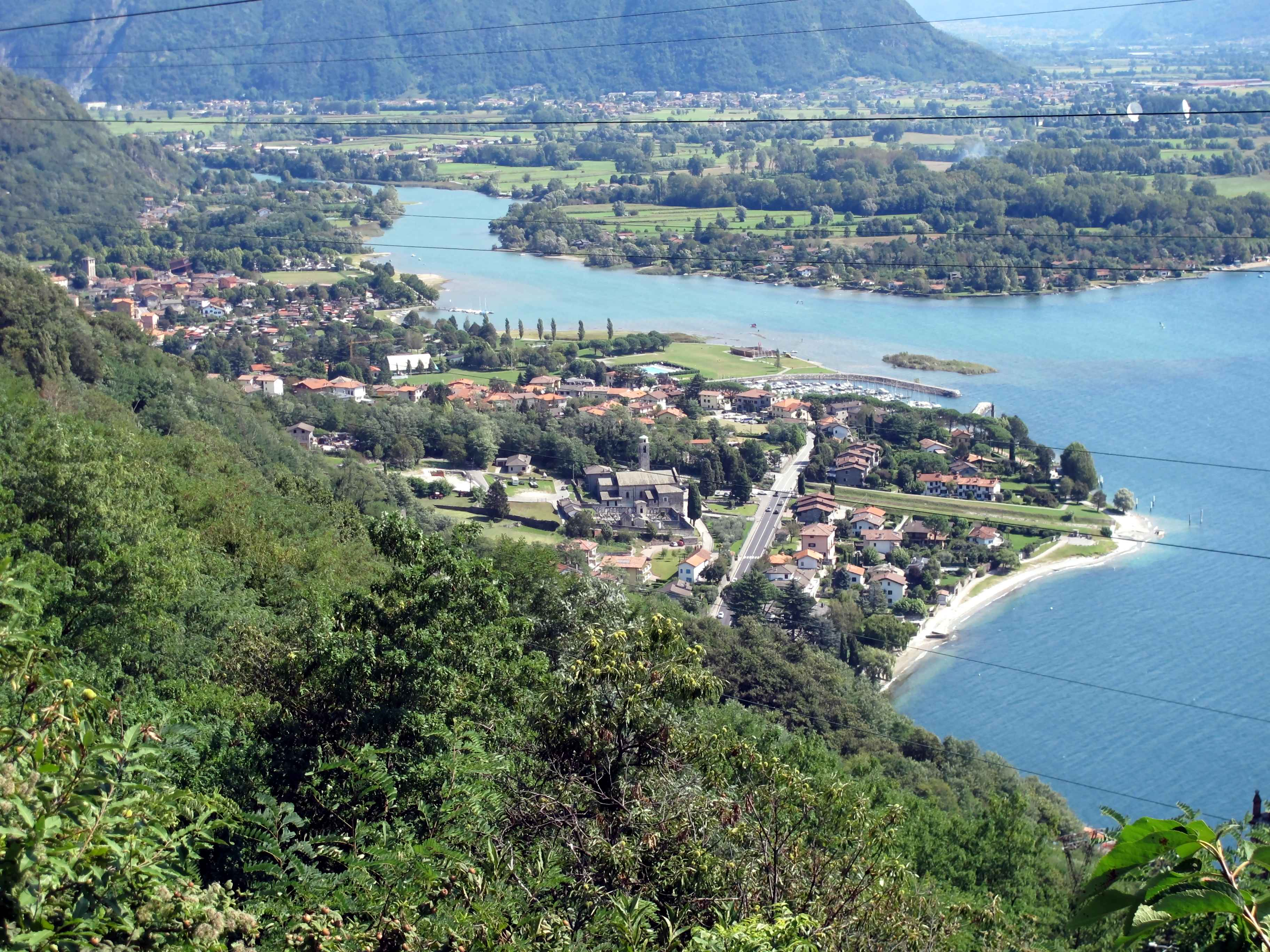
- View of Gera Lario from above

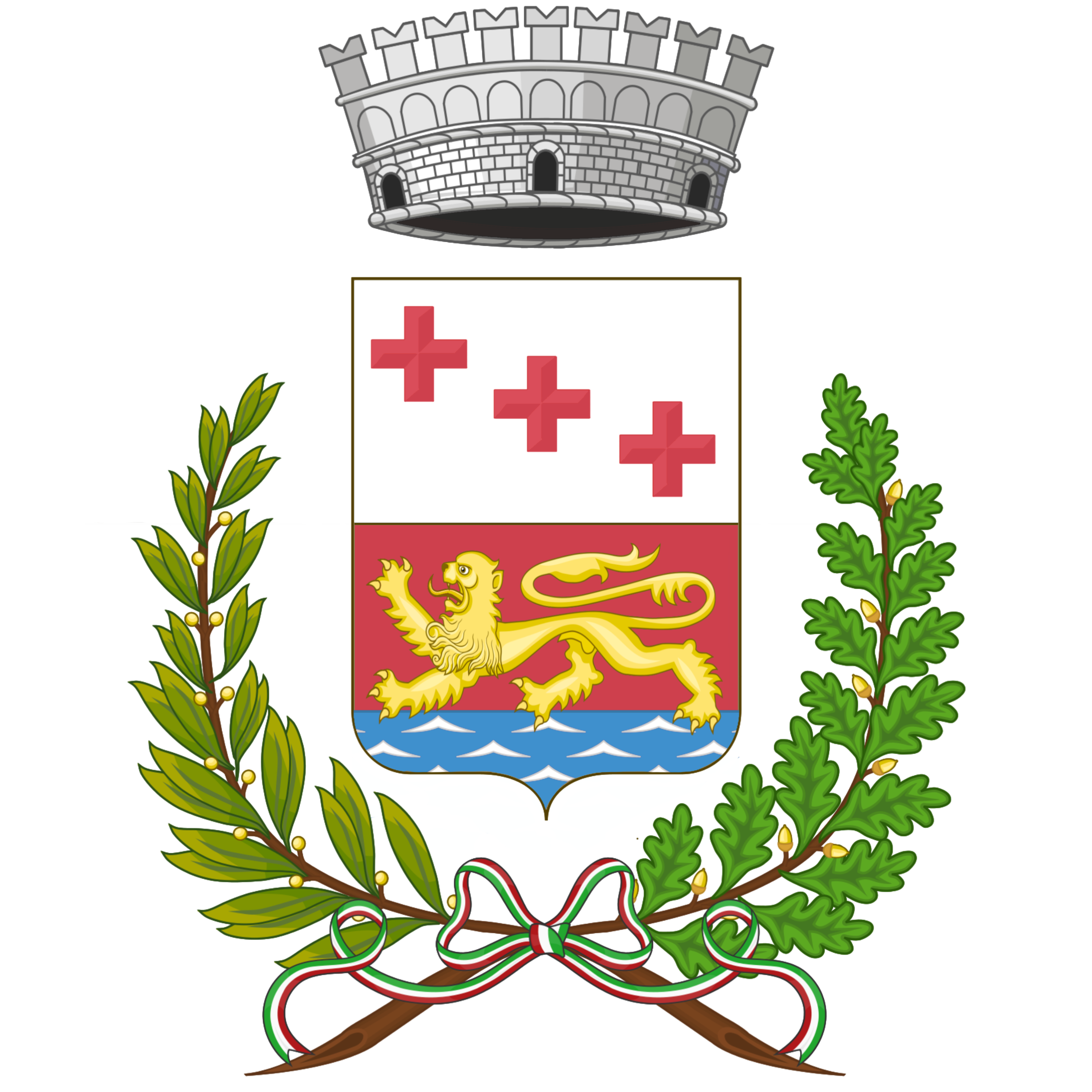
- Coat of arms

- Location within Italy Location within Lombardy
- Coordinates: 46°10′N 9°22′E
- Country: Italy
- Region: Lombardy
- Province: Province of Como (CO)

Area
  - Total: 6.7 km^{2} (2.6 sq mi)

Population (Dec. 2004)
  - Total: 942
  - Density: 140/km^{2} (360/sq mi)
- Time zone: UTC+1 (CET)
  - Summer (DST): UTC+2 (CEST)
- Postal code: 22010
- Dialing code: 0344

Gera Lario (Ticinese: Gera) is a comune (municipality) in the Province of Como in the Italian region of Lombardy, located about 80 kilometres (50 mi) north of Milan and about 45 kilometres (28 mi) northeast of Como. As of 31 December 2004, it had a population of 942 and an area of 6.7 km^{2} (2.6 sq mi).

Gera Lario borders the following municipalities: Colico, Dubino, Montemezzo, Piantedo, Sorico, Trezzone, Vercana.

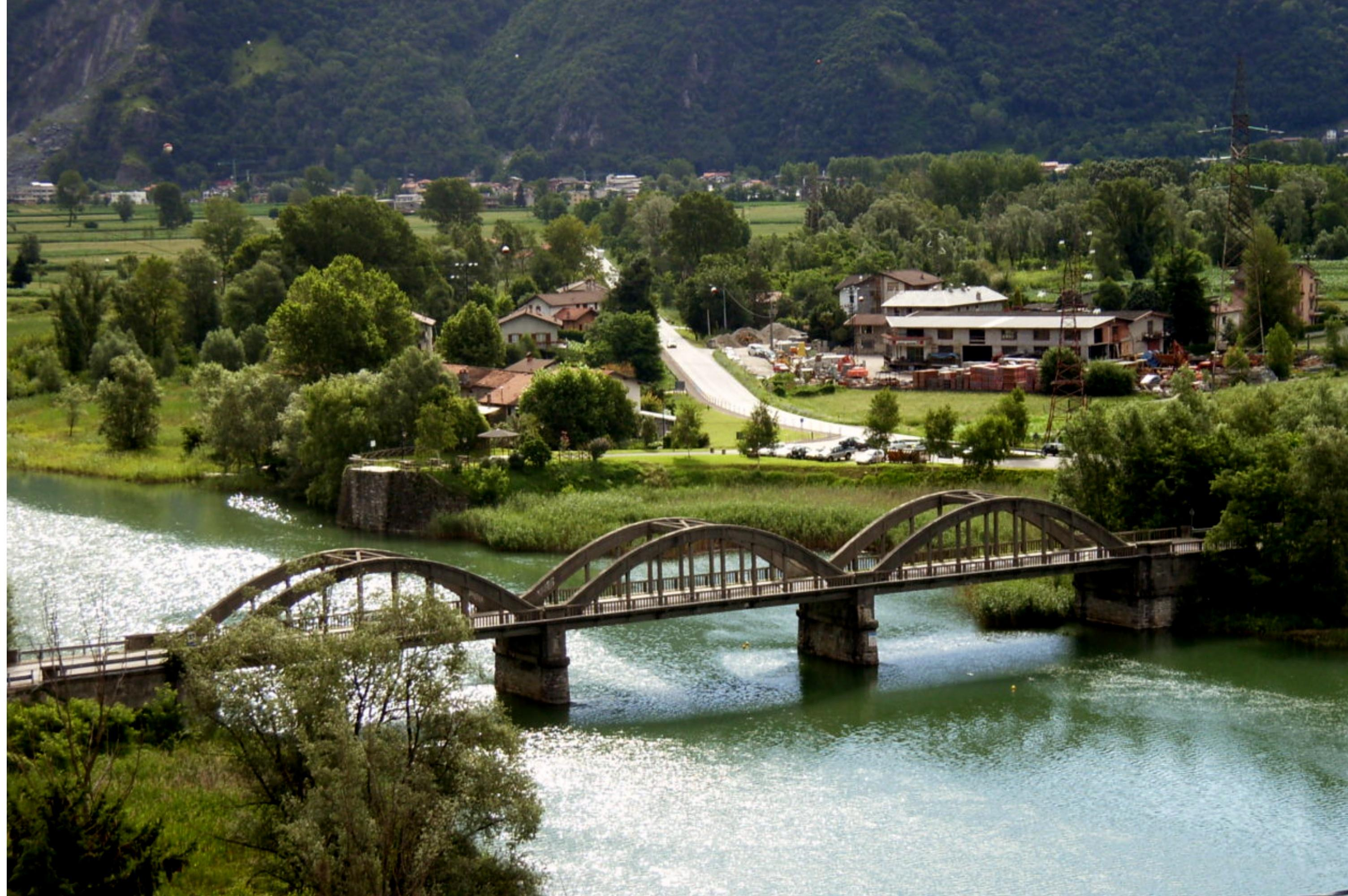
The town with the bridge

== Demographic evolution ==
Historical population

Year	Pop.	±%
1861	628	—
1871	645	+2.7%
1881	582	−9.8%
1901	646	+11.0%
1911	677	+4.8%

Year	Pop.	±%
1921	689	+1.8%
1931	693	+0.6%
1936	713	+2.9%
1951	773	+8.4%
1961	854	+10.5%

Year	Pop.	±%
1971	919	+7.6%
1981	943	+2.6%
1991	926	−1.8%
2001	882	−4.8%

Source: Data from ISTAT
