= Monte Legnone =

Mountain in Italy

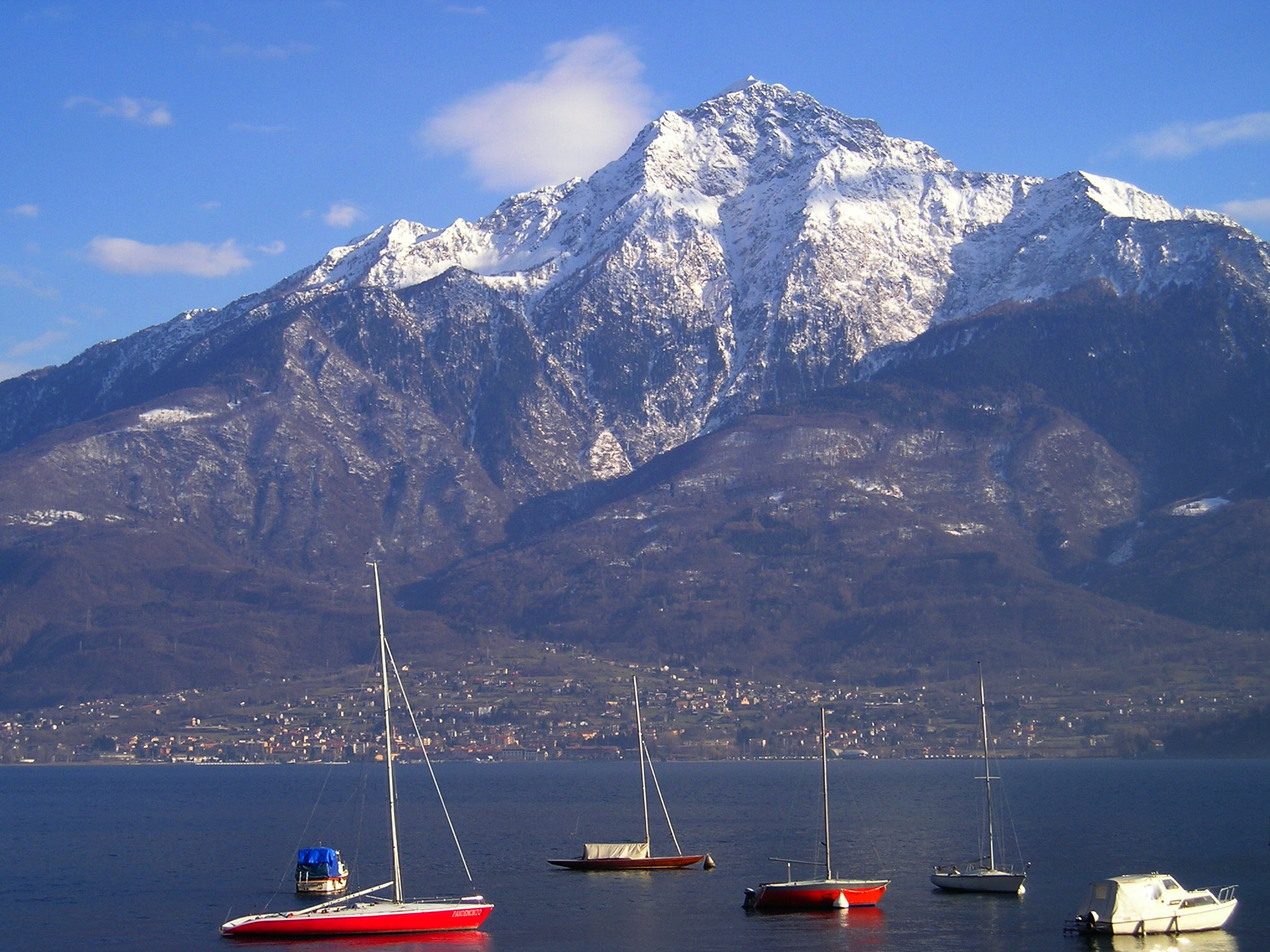
- Monte Legnone from Lake Como

Highest point
- Elevation: 2,609 m (8,560 ft)
- Prominence: 624 m (2,047 ft)
- Coordinates: 46°5′N 9°24′E

Geography
- Location within Alps
- Location: Lombardy, Italy
- Parent range: Bergamo Alps

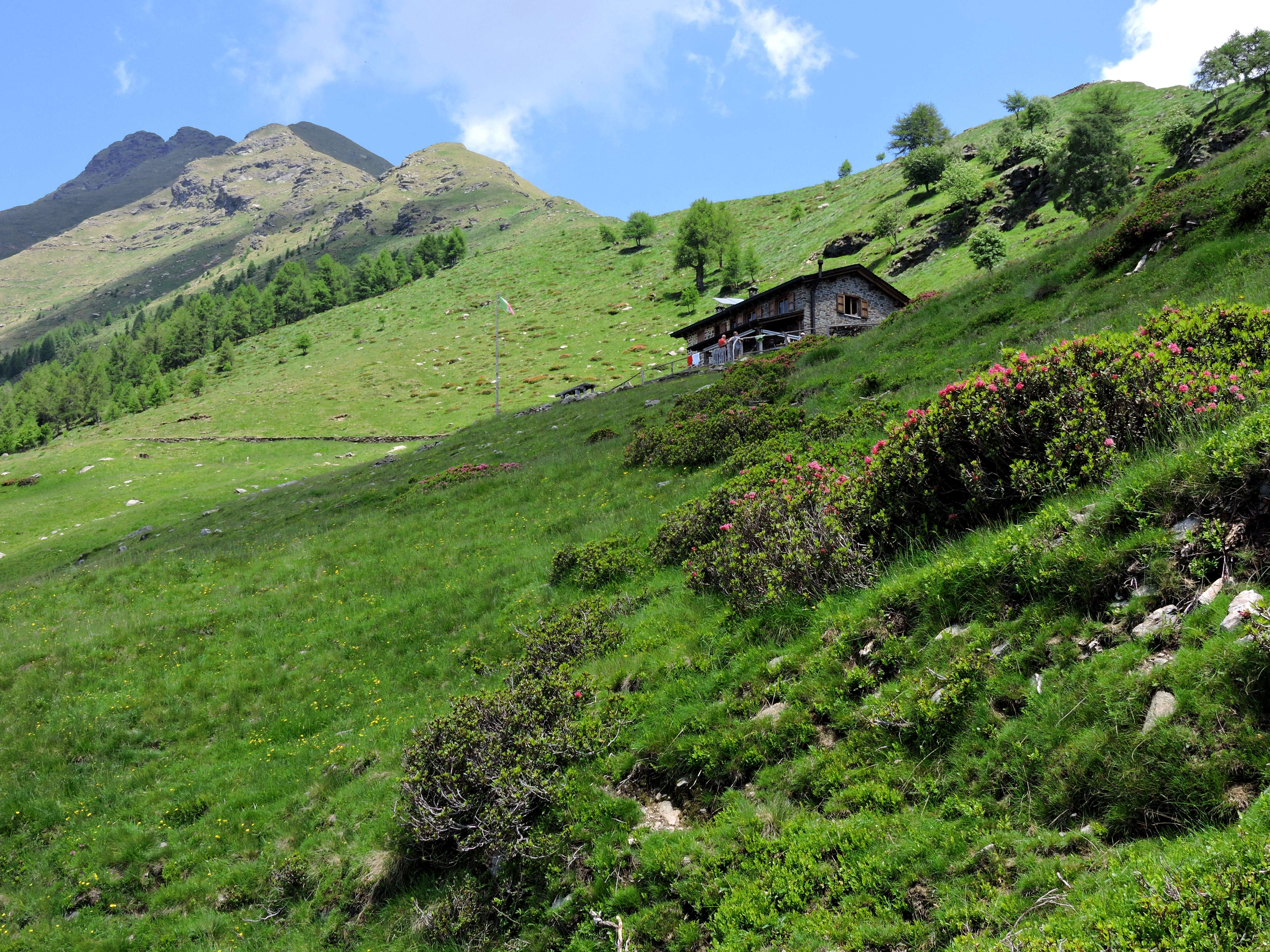
Rifugio Griera, at Monte Legnone

Monte Legnone is a mountain of the Bergamo Alps in Lombardy, northern Italy. It is located between the valleys of Valsassina and Valtellina near Lake Como and Colico. With a height of 2,609 meters, it is the highest mountain in the Province of Lecco and one of the highest in the western Orobic Alps.
