= Villatico =

- Frazione
- Location of Villatico in Italy
- Country: Italy
- Region: Lombardy
- Province: Province of Lecco
- Comune: Colico
- Time zone: UTC+1 (CET)
  - Summer (DST): UTC+2 (CEST)
- Postal code: 23823
- Dialing code: 0341
- Patron saint: Bernardino of Siena
- Saint day: 2 October

Villatico is a frazione of the comune of Colico, Lombardy, northern Italy.

== History ==
Documents dating from 1239 prove the existence of a mill located in Villatico. After a flood in 1496 destroyed the town of St. George (now Colico Piano), Villatico became the largest town in the Colico area. Meanwhile, devotion for St. Bernardino of Siena, known for curing the plague victims. In the 18th century, after the plague ended, the first harbor built in the town and Colico Piano became increasingly important.

== Monuments and places of interest ==
Sights include the church of San Bernardino of Siena, the parish church built in the second half of the 15th century.

== Notable people ==
- Maria Laura Mainetti: Roman Catholic nun and victim of a satanic human sacrifice, who was declared a martyr and subsequently beatified.

== Bibliography ==
- Giovanni Del Tredici; Elena Fattarelli (2007). Colico e il Monte Legnone – Sentieri e Storia (in Italian). Colico: CAI of Colico.

== See also ==
- Colico
- Curcio
- Laghetto
- Olgiasca
