= Laghetto =

- Frazione
- Location of Laghetto in Italy
- Country: Italy
- Region: Lombardy
- Province: Province of Lecco
- Comune: Colico
- Time zone: UTC+1 (CET)
  - Summer (DST): UTC+2 (CEST)
- Postal code: 23823
- Dialing code: 0341
- Patron saint: Saint Fidelis of Como

Laghetto is a frazione of the comune of Colico, Lombardy, northern Italy.

Laghetto is a new name designed to combine many places, such as Borgonuovo, Fiumarga, La Cà and Corte, in a single village, the name officially appearing in 1770. In 1760 began the migration of some families who lived in Olgiasca following a tax dispute with the Austrian.

Sights include the church of Saint Fidelis of Como.

== See also ==
- Villatico
- Curcio
- Olgiasca

== Sources ==
- Giovanni Del Tredici, Elena Fattarelli, Colico e il Monte Legnone – Sentieri e Storia, CAI Colico, 2007
