= Leonardo Carioni =

Italian politician (born 1952)

President of the Province of Como
- In office 28 May 2002 – 2 June 2012
- Preceded by: Armando Selva
- Succeeded by: Maria Rita Livio

Mayor of Turate
- In office 14 June 1999 – 29 March 2010

Personal details
- Born: Leonardo Ambrogio Carioni; 13 December 1952 (age 73) Turate, Province of Como, Italy
- Party: Lega Nord; Northern People's Party
- Occupation: Textile entrepreneur

Leonardo Ambrogio Carioni (born 13 December 1952) is an Italian politician and entrepreneur who served as president of the Province of Como from 2002 to 2012.

== Life and career ==
Carioni was born in Turate, province of Como, in 1952 and worked as a textile entrepreneur. He joined the Lega Nord in 1999 and was elected mayor of Turate that year. He was re-elected in 2005.

In the 2002 provincial election, Carioni was elected president of the Province of Como, receiving 59.3% of the vote as the candidate of a centre-right coalition comprising the Lega Nord, Forza Italia, National Alliance and the UDC.

Carioni was re-elected in 2007, winning 67.8% of the vote in the first round against Mauro Guerra, who received 28.6%. He also served as president of UPI Lombardy. At the end of his term in 2012, due to the transition to the new provincial system, Carioni was appointed extraordinary commissioner of the province, serving until October 2014.

He subsequently served on the boards of Expo 2015 and Pedemontana Lombarda Highway.

In January 2026, Carioni joined the Northern People's Party, the political movement founded by Roberto Castelli.
