= List of presidents of the Province of Como =

President of the Province of Como
- Presidente della Provincia di Como
- Incumbent; Fiorenzo Bongiasca since 2 November 2018
- Term length: 4 years
- Inaugural holder: Giuseppe Gatti
- Formation: 1889

The president of the Province of Como is the head of the provincial government in Como, Lombardy, Italy. The president oversees the administration of the province, coordinates the activities of the municipalities, and represents the province in regional and national matters.

Since November 2018, the office has been held by Fiorenzo Bongiasca of the centre-left coalition.

== List ==
=== Presidents of the Provincial Deputation (1889–1927) ===
No.	Portrait	Name	Term of office		Party
No.	Portrait	Name	Start	End	Party
1		Giuseppe Gatti	1889	1899	?
2		Carlo Scacchi	1900	1905	?
3		Bruno Brunati	1905	1910	?
4		Giuseppe Longhi	1910	1913	?
5		Filippo Andina	1913	?	?

=== Presidents of the Province (1951–present) ===
No.	Portrait	Name	Term of office		Party
No.	Portrait	Name	Start	End	Party
		?	?	?	?
		Giovanni Orsenigo	?	2 August 1990	Christian Democracy
		Anna Maria Bassi	2 August 1990	3 January 1994	Italian Socialist Party
		Luciano Bettiga	2 March 1994	8 May 1995	Italian Socialist Party
		Giuseppe Livio	8 May 1995	19 March 1997	Federation of the Greens
		Alberto Ardia (Prefectural commissioner)	19 March 1997	1 December 1997	—
		Armando Selva	1 December 1997	28 May 2002	Lega Nord
		Leonardo Carioni	28 May 2002	29 May 2007	Lega Nord
		Leonardo Carioni	29 May 2007	2 June 2012	Lega Nord
		Leonardo Carioni	2 June 2012	13 October 2014	Lega Nord
		Maria Rita Livio	13 October 2014	2 November 2018	Democratic Party
		Fiorenzo Bongiasca	2 November 2018	27 November 2022	Independent (centre-left)
		Fiorenzo Bongiasca	27 November 2022	Incumbent	Independent (centre-left)

== Sources ==
- "Storia amministrativa dell'ente". Ministero dell'Interno.
- Menichini, Piera (2005). "I presidenti delle Province dall'Unità alla Grande guerra: repertorio analitico". Storia Amministrazione Costituzione (13): 243–244.
