= Piona Abbey =

Building complex in Colico, Italy

Piona Abbey, Saint Nicholas (Abbazia di Piona)
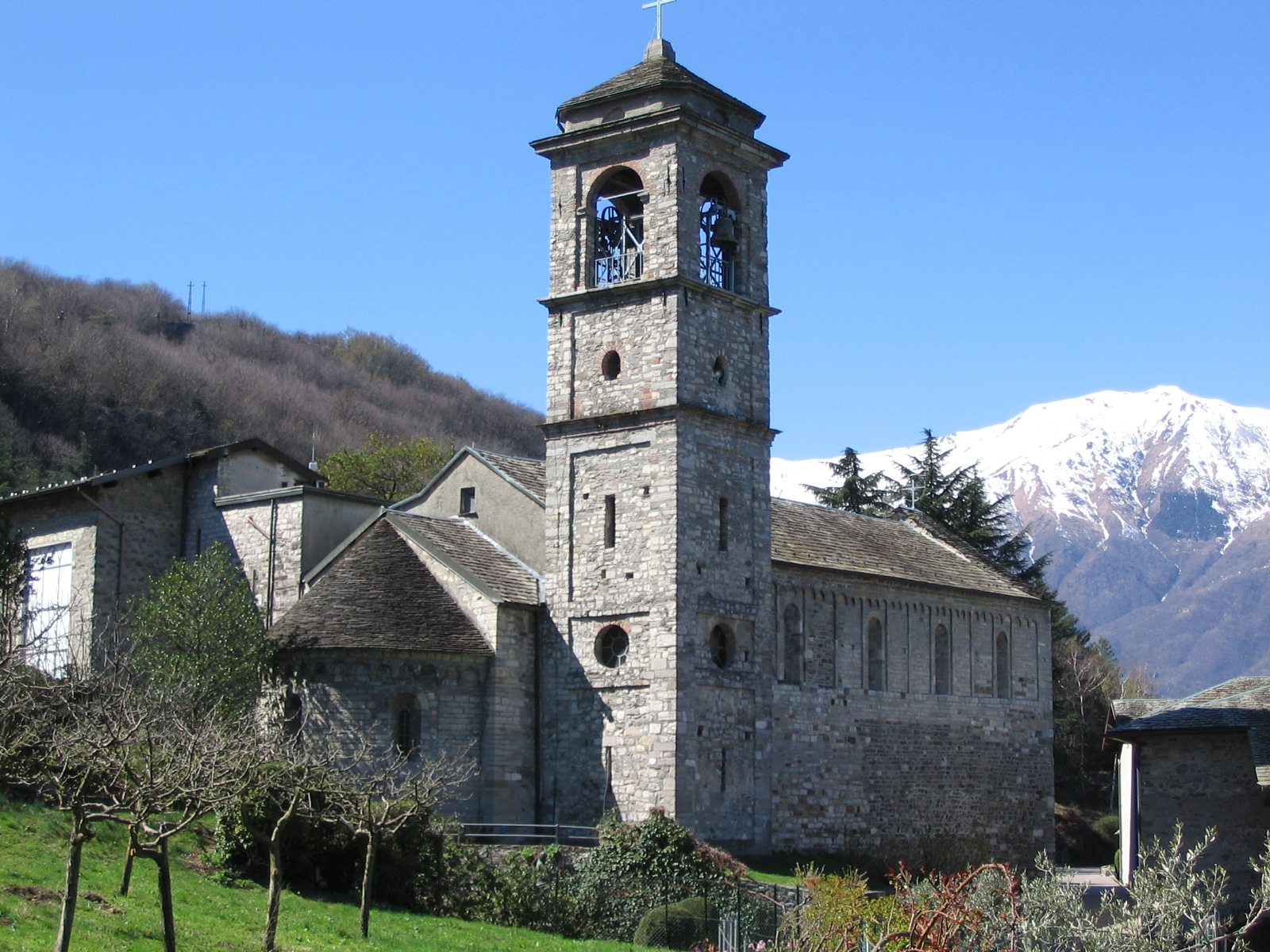
- Piona Abbey

Religion
- Affiliation: Catholic
- Province: Lecco
- Ecclesiastical or organisational status: National monument
- Status: Active

Location
- Location: Colico, Italy
- Interactive map of Piona Abbey, Saint Nicholas (Abbazia di Piona)
- Coordinates: 46.123755°N 9.331581°E

Architecture
- Type: Church
- Style: Romanesque

The Piona Priory or Piona Abbey, is a religious complex on the Lecco bank of Lake Como in the territory of the comune of Colico, northern Italy.

The abbey is set at the top of a small peninsula, the Olgiasca, which – like a crooked finger – points into the lake, creating an inlet.

== The scenery ==
The original church of Saint Justina was founded in the 7th century; the ruins of an apse behind the current church of San Nicola belong to this original edifice. A new church was added some centuries later, though before 1138, as testified by an inscription reporting its reconsecration in that date. This was followed some centuries afterwards by a priory, with its monastery complex, part of the political-religious network which was led by Cluny and its reform movement.

The location, although away from the main town, was on a military route of critical importance in the wars of the times.

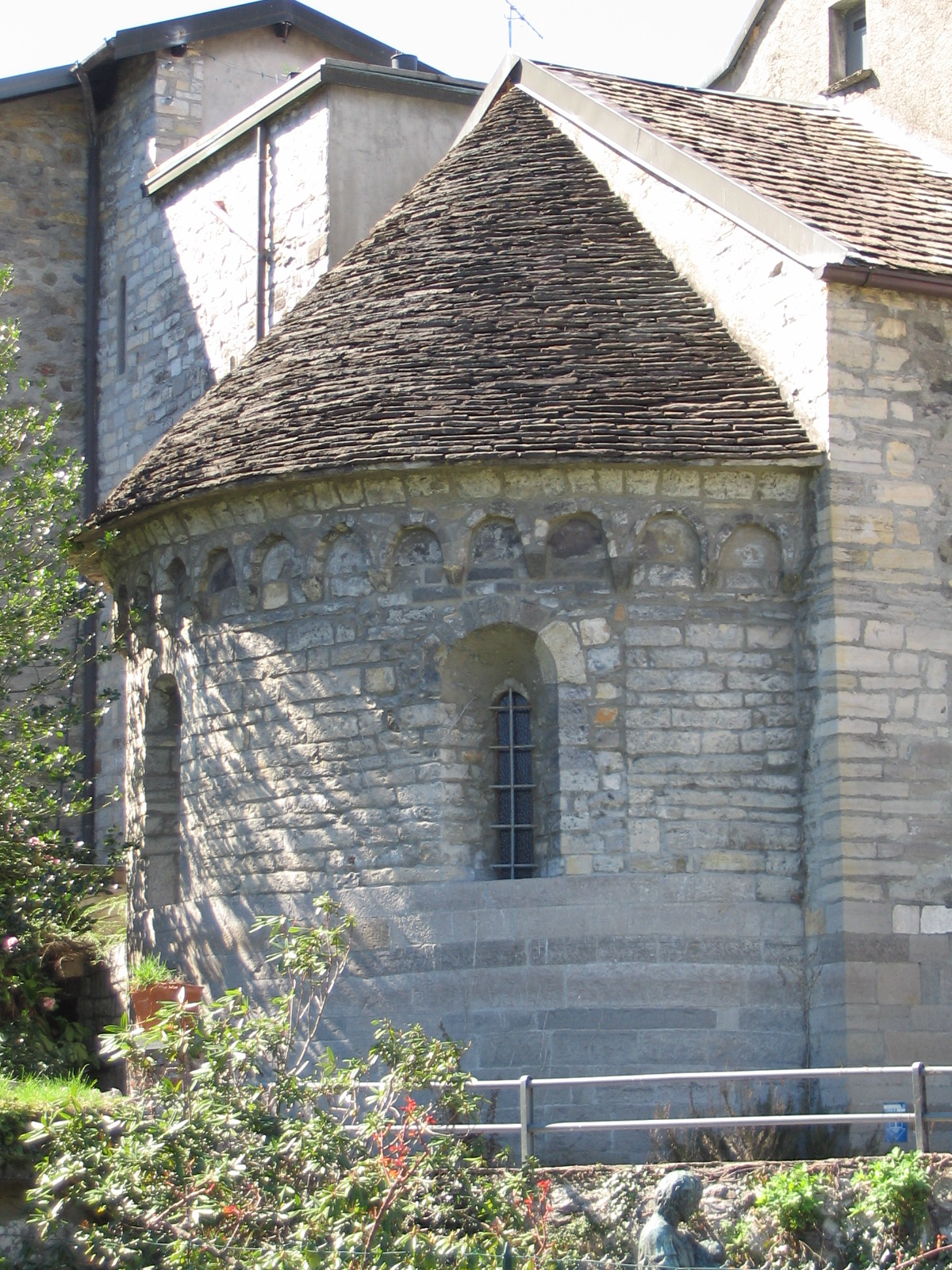
Apse of Saint Nicholas's church

The complex was later put in commendam. It was acquired by the Cistercian order in 1938.

== Description ==
The abbey is in Lombard Gothic style, with French influences. The church has a single nave, measuring 20 x c. 8 m; the current edifice dates mostly from the 12th century reconstruction. The bell tower dates from the 18th century. A previous one, with an octagonal plan, was located on the other side of the church.

The apse has internally some depleted frescoes, dating from the 12th-13th centuries, with Apostles of Byzantine style. The cloister has an irregularly quadrangular plan, and has round arches supported by columns with different type capitals. The northern wall of the portico has a fresco with a symbolic calendar, depicting the months and the different works associated to them.
