= Agustín Codera =

Spanish water polo player (born 1949)

Personal information
- Full name: Agustín Codera Vistuer
- Nationality: Spanish
- Born: 9 August 1949 (age 75); Barcelona, Spain
- Height: 175 cm (5 ft 9 in)
- Weight: 72 kg (159 lb)

Sport
- Sport: Water polo

Agustín Codera Vistuer (Note: In this Spanish name, the first or paternal surname is Codera and the second or maternal family name is Vistuer.) (born 9 August 1949) is a Spanish water polo player. He competed in the men's tournament at the 1968 Summer Olympics.
