= Samolaco =

- Comune
- Comune di Samolaco, Cittadina di Samolaco
- Location within Italy Location within Lombardy
- Coordinates: 46°16′N 9°23′E
- Country: Italy
- Region: Lombardy
- Province: Province of Sondrio (SO)

Area
  - Total: 44.5 km^{2} (17.2 sq mi)
- Elevation: 236 m (774 ft)

Population (31 December 2005)
  - Total: 2,913
  - Density: 65.5/km^{2} (170/sq mi)
- Time zone: UTC+1 (CET)
  - Summer (DST): UTC+2 (CEST)
- Postal code: 23027
- Dialing code: 0343

Samolaco (Lombard: Samolegh or Samolagh) is a comune (municipality) in the Province of Sondrio in the Italian region Lombardy, located about 90 kilometres (56 mi) north of the regional capital Milan and about 40 kilometres (25 mi) northwest of Sondrio. As of 31 December 2005, it had a population of 2,913 and an area of 44.5 square kilometres (17.2 mi^{2}).

The territory of the comune, mostly mountainous, includes of a number of small centres of population, notably Casenda, Era, Giumello, San Pietro and Somaggia. All of these lie in the valley known as the Piano di Chiavenna, just to the north of the small lake Lago di Mezzola, which itself lies to the north of Lake Como. There is no centre called Samolaco, although the community centre, a grocery store, a bank, two bars, a farm supply store and an artisan honey producer lie in the Samolaco area.

Samolaco borders the following municipalities: Gordona, Livo, Montemezzo, Novate Mezzola, Prata Camportaccio, Sorico, Vercana.

== Demographic evolution ==
Historical population

Year	Pop.	±%
1861	1,305	—
1871	1,582	+21.2%
1881	1,876	+18.6%
1901	1,920	+2.3%
1911	1,952	+1.7%

Year	Pop.	±%
1921	2,344	+20.1%
1931	2,128	−9.2%
1936	2,206	+3.7%
1951	2,312	+4.8%
1961	2,355	+1.9%

Year	Pop.	±%
1971	2,497	+6.0%
1981	2,639	+5.7%
1991	2,780	+5.3%
2001	2,829	+1.8%

Source: Data from ISTAT
