= Curcio =

Coordinates: 46.1340°N 9.3998°E

- Frazione
- Location of Curcio in Italy
- Country: Italy
- Region: Lombardy
- Province: Province of Lecco
- Comune: Colico
- Time zone: UTC+1 (CET)
  - Summer (DST): UTC+2 (CEST)
- Postal code: 23823
- Dialing code: 0341
- Patron saint: Holy Guardian Angels
- Saint day: 2 October

Curcio is a part of the mainland of Colico, Lombardy, northern Italy.

The name Curcio is first mentioned in a slab dated 1585, which can still be seen as a part of the public washing fountain of the town. The first church was built in 1842 and dedicated to Holy Guardian Angels; a new church was built in 1946-1957.

== Sources ==
- Giovanni Del Tredici, Elena Fattarelli, Colico e il Monte Legnone – Sentieri e Storia, CAI Colico, 2007

== See also ==
- Colico
- Villatico
- Laghetto
- Olgiasca
