= Trezzone =

Trezzone Trezzon (Lombard)
- Comune
- Comune di Trezzone
- Location within Italy Location within Lombardy
- Coordinates: 46°10′N 9°21′E
- Country: Italy
- Region: Lombardy
- Province: Province of Como (CO)

Area
  - Total: 4.0 km^{2} (1.5 sq mi)
- Elevation: 430 m (1,410 ft)

Population (Dec. 2004)
  - Total: 212
  - Density: 53/km^{2} (140/sq mi)
- Time zone: UTC+1 (CET)
  - Summer (DST): UTC+2 (CEST)
- Postal code: 22010
- Dialing code: 0344

Trezzone (Lombard: Trezzon [tretsũː] or [treˈtsõː]) is a comune (municipality) in the Province of Como in the Italian region Lombardy, located about 80 kilometres (50 mi) north of Milan and about 45 kilometres (28 mi) northeast of Como. As of 31 December 2004, it had a population of 212 and an area of 4.0 square kilometres (1.5 mi^{2}).

Trezzone borders the following municipalities: Gera Lario, Montemezzo, Vercana.

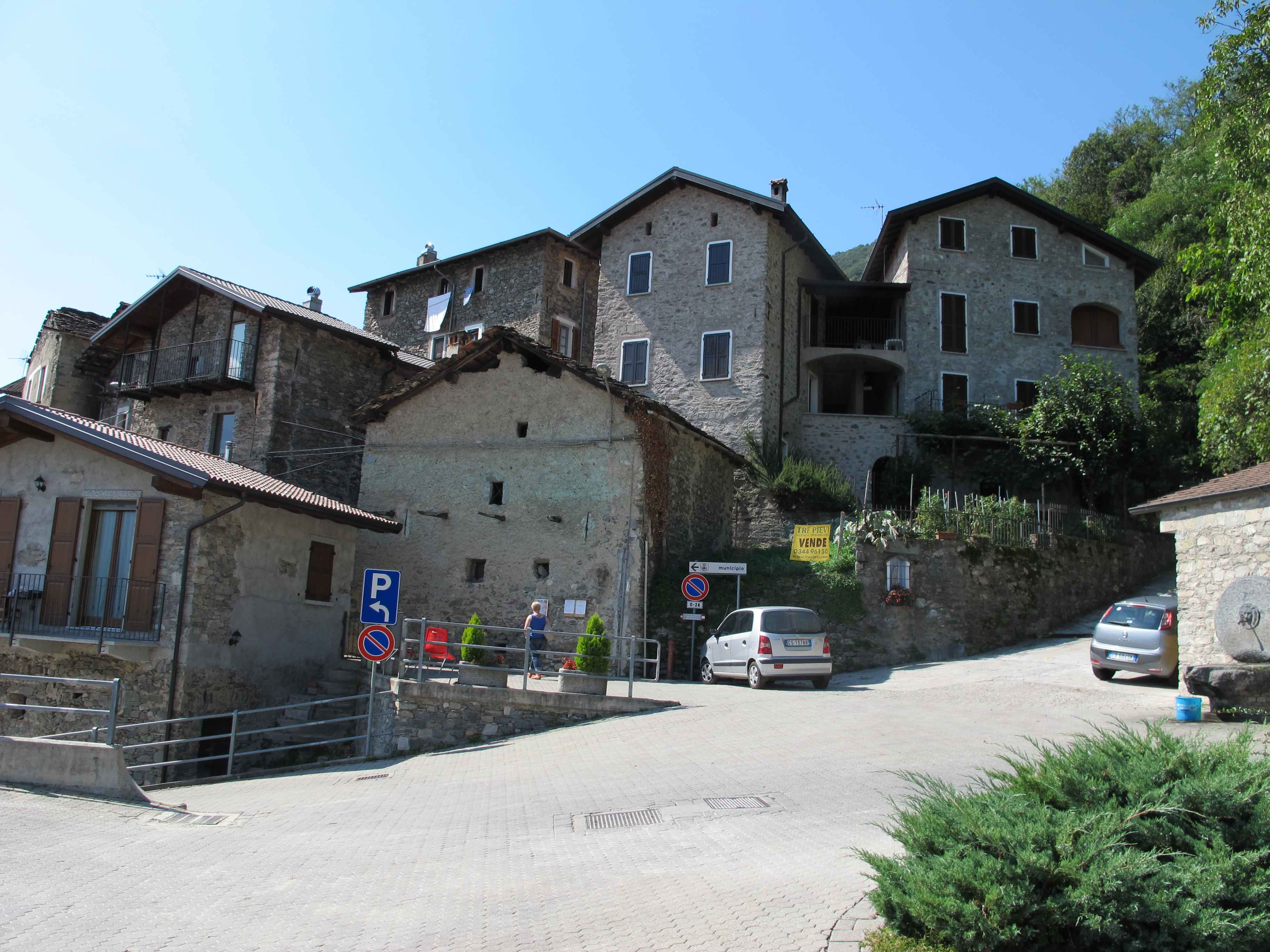
Trezzone, Lombardy

== Population history ==
Historical population

Year	Pop.	±%
1861	359	—
1871	336	−6.4%
1881	339	+0.9%
1901	284	−16.2%
1911	275	−3.2%

Year	Pop.	±%
1921	221	−19.6%
1931	235	+6.3%
1936	233	−0.9%
1951	226	−3.0%
1961	193	−14.6%

Year	Pop.	±%
1971	155	−19.7%
1981	179	+15.5%
1991	183	+2.2%
2001	202	+10.4%

Source: Data from ISTAT
