= Colico =

Comune in the province of Lecco

Colico Còlich, Còlegh (Lombard)
- Comune
- Comune di Colico
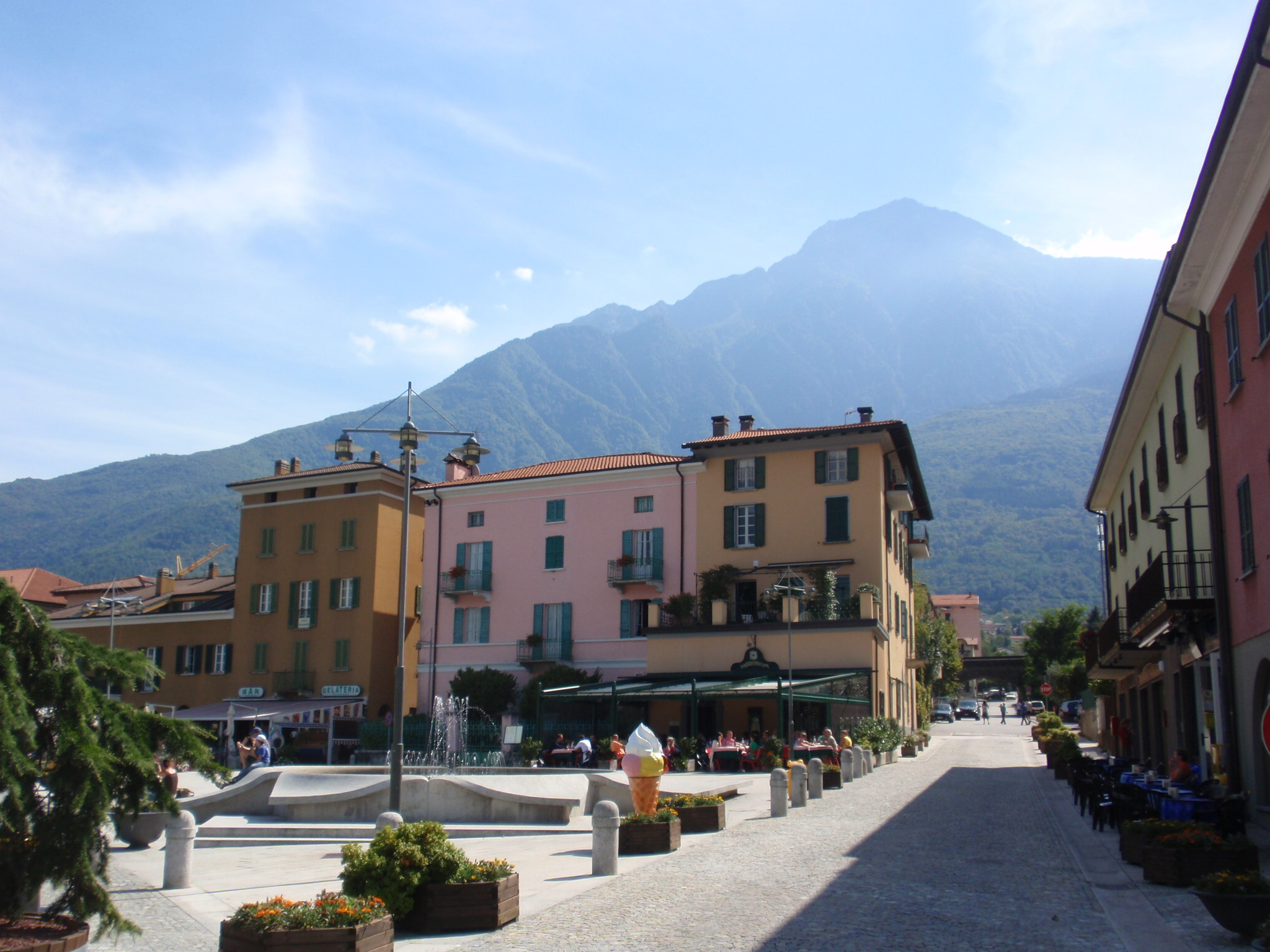

- Coat of arms

- Location within Italy Location within Lombardy
- Coordinates: 46°08′09″N 9°22′18″E
- Country: Italy
- Region: Lombardy
- Province: Lecco
- Frazioni: Curcio (and Palerma locality), Laghetto (Corte, Borgonuovo, Piona, La Cà, Fumiarga), Olgiasca, Villatico, Posallo, Fontanedo, San Rocco

Government
  - Mayor: Monica Gilardi

Area
  - Total: 35.3 km^{2} (13.6 sq mi)
- Elevation: 218 m (715 ft)

Population (31/12/2023)
  - Total: 8,100 (approx.)
  - Density: 230/km^{2} (590/sq mi)
- Demonym: Colichesi
- Time zone: UTC+1 (CET)
  - Summer (DST): UTC+2 (CEST)
- Postal code: 23823
- Dialing code: 0341
- Patron saint: Saint George
- Saint day: 23 April
- Website: www.comune.colico.lc.it

Colico (Comasque: Còlich [ˈkɔlik] or Còlegh [ˈkɔlek]; Latin: Colicum) is a town and comune in the province of Lecco, in Lombardy in northern Italy. It is situated on the northern arm of Lake Como, where the river Adda enters the lake. Colico is the largest town in the northern part of Lake Como, which is often identified as its Colico branch.

Colico is a local transport hub, with boats to Como and Lecco, as well as trains and roads to Milan (via the eastern shore of the lake, Lecco and Brianza), to Chiavenna, and eastwards to Bolzano, via Passo dello Stelvio.

The Abbey of Piona on the Olgiasca peninsula lies within the comune.

== Geography ==
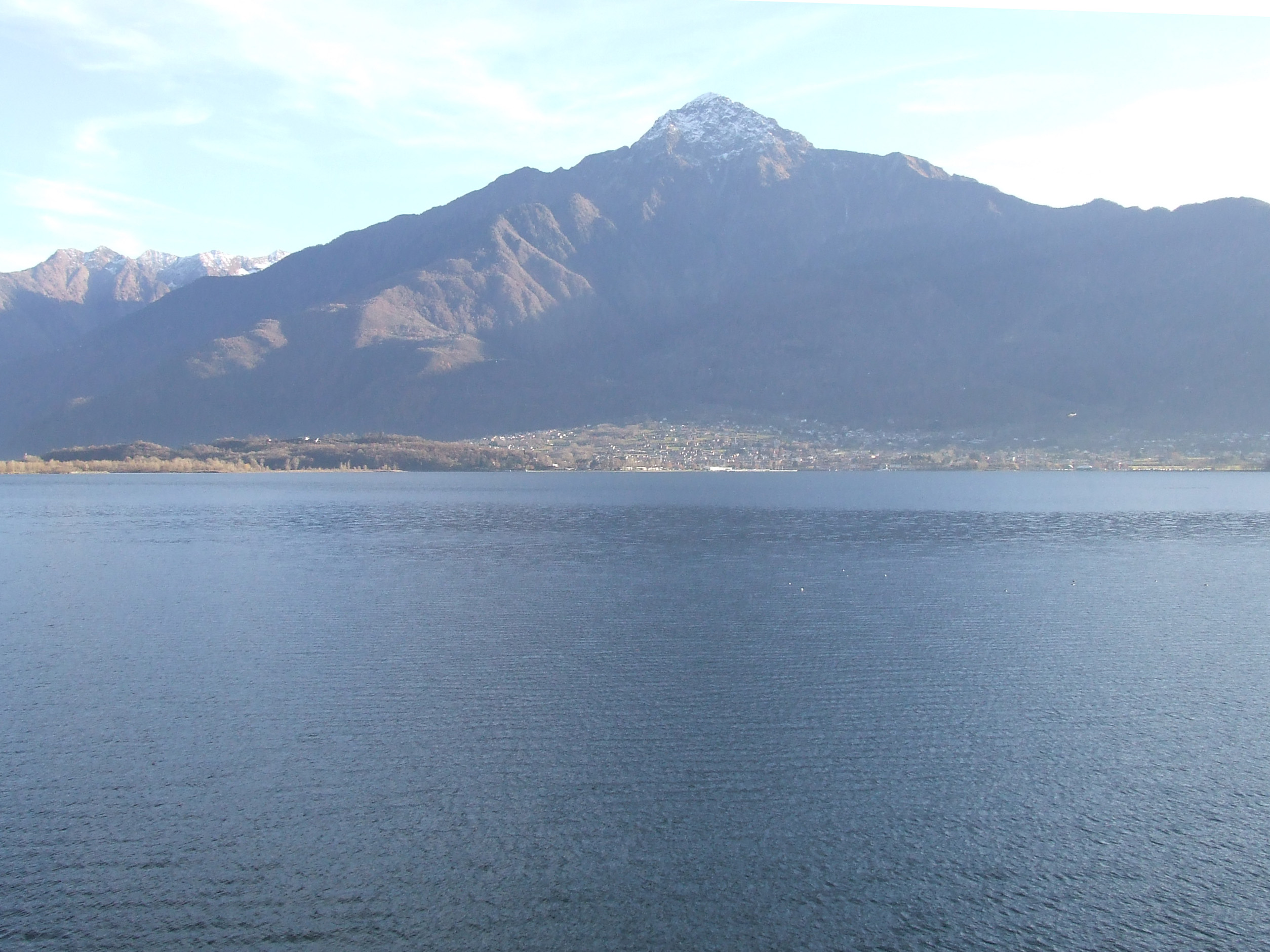
Colico with the Lake

Colico is dominated by Monte Legnone, at 2,609 metres (8,560 ft) above sea level, and high foothills. Near Colico is an important natural reserve, the migration corridor of the Pian di Spagna (in the province of Como). The two main waterways of Colico are Inganna and Perlino; the river Adda is a natural boundary between the provinces of Como and Lecco.

== Main sights ==
=== Forts ===
- Fort Montecchio, a fort built during World War I
- Fort Fuentes, a fort built by the Spanish governor of Milan in the early 17th century

=== Towers ===
The whole area was fortified during the Middle Ages, before the construction of the Fort Fuentes. On the northern Montecchio hill are still visible two guard towers, which formed the so-called Castle Colico, built in the Medieval commune period to control the road from Valtellina. The most important from a strategic point of view was Fontanedo Tower, part of a more complex work of fortification built during the 14th century by Visconti. From the tower it was possible to dominate the Upper Lake, the hinterland of Colico and the area of the Lake Mezzola. In defense of the ancient road linking Lake Como with Valtellina, within the territory of Curcio, there is another lookout tower, now transformed into a farm house and called the Curcio tower.

Another part of the defense system is Fortino d'Adda, or Stallone, located out of the border municipalities in the territory of Gera Lario. Its unique structure has slots for the shot of a firearm and a brick bridge that connects the main entrance to the plain. It is currently used for storage. Another fort is placed in the territory of Olgiasca. It is a casaforte ("stronghouse", or fortified house), which from the top of the hill controls the town below. It is known as the Castle of Mirabello and it is thought to have been built in the first half of the 16th century.

=== Roccoli ===
Roccoli, or bird snares, are tree architectures, equipped with nets placed vertically, which surround a sort of stone tower from which the hunting was run. They have long been formidable weapons to catch birds which, at the approaching of winter, migrate southwards. This activity was economically important for Colico, placed on the route of the flocks. Of the many bird snares active until about forty years ago, are still well preserved those located near Piona and along the road that goes up to the Fort Fuentes.

=== Religious buildings ===
- Piona Abbey, located in the Olgiasca peninsula, and home to a Romanesque church built in the mid-11th century, and later enlarged.
- The small Romanesque church of San Rocco, originally dedicated to the Saints Fabian and Sebastian, located outside the town on the slopes of Monte Legnone, almost midway between the streams of Inganna and Perlino, at a height of five hundred meters.

Traces of painting, particularly in the apse, are due to an unknown painter from the early 15th century. They include the Christ Pantocrator, flanked by the prophets Jeremiah and Isaiah. A restoration campaign held in recent years discovered an interesting fresco depicting the Last Supper.

=== Villas ===
- Villa Malpensata, located in an isolated position on the lake shore, facing the lake near Olgiasca. It is a nineteenth-century building, which incorporates an older structure.
- Villa Osio, located at the end of Via Lungolario Polti and forms the boundary to the shore. It is currently privately owned.

== Culture ==
=== Media ===
The main newspapers are the provincial ones: La Gazzetta di Lecco or La Provincia di Lecco; "Teleunica" is the main local TV of the province.

=== Events ===
The most important event taking place in Colico is the Italian stage of the World Cup of kitesurfing. A classical music festival, Musica sull'Acqua (Water Music), takes place in Piazza Garibaldi and at the Abbey of Piona. The feast of San Rocco is celebrated on 16 August in the homonymous church.

== Human geography ==
Colico is formed by a centre and several frazioni.

=== Centre ===
The centre is situated between Piazza Garibaldi, Via Vitali, Largo San Giorgio and Via Pontile. This district contains the main services of Colico. Between Via Municipio and Piazza Alpini are the City Hall, the library, the church of Saint George and the main schools. The post office is in Via Villatico.

This district has a long beach, a field of soccer, tennis courts and a school of sailing. There are a parking lot for motor vehicles, a beach and a school of surfing and kite flying. Near the centre is the industrial zone, home to several factories and the town's landfill.

=== Frazioni ===
The main frazioni are Colico Piano, Villatico, Curcio (and Palerma locality), Laghetto (composed of Borgonuovo, Corte, La Cà, Fumiarga, Piona localities), Posallo, Fontanedo, San Rocco. They rise around the parochial churches, whose origins go back to various periods. The most ancient is the parish of Nicola of Bari (celebrated on 6 December) in Olgiasca; traces of its building go back to 1252. A document dated 7 November 1593 speaks of the "Parish priory, or Piona Abbey", in charge of Cistercian monks.

=== Economy ===
The economy is mainly based on tourism, but industry holds a strong second place, as the expanding industrial zone shows, and there is also a large presence of banks. The tourism is mainly focused on the many campsites. The industry boasts leading brands of construction trucks (Iveco) and yachts (Cranchi).

== Transportation ==
Colico is served by a railway station on the Tirano–Lecco railway, which was once electrified with three phase - 3000 V by the Hungarian firm Ganz in 1901. Between 1885 and 1886 Colico was connected with Sondrio and Chiavenna, although a link with Lecco was active only from 1894. The line was then operated by the Adriatic Network, one of three major companies that remained in effect until 1905, year of birth of the Ferrovie dello Stato.

Piona has also a railway station.

== Twin cities ==
- Wolfegg, Germany
