= Sorico =

Sorico Suregh (Lombard)
- Comune
- Comune di Sorico
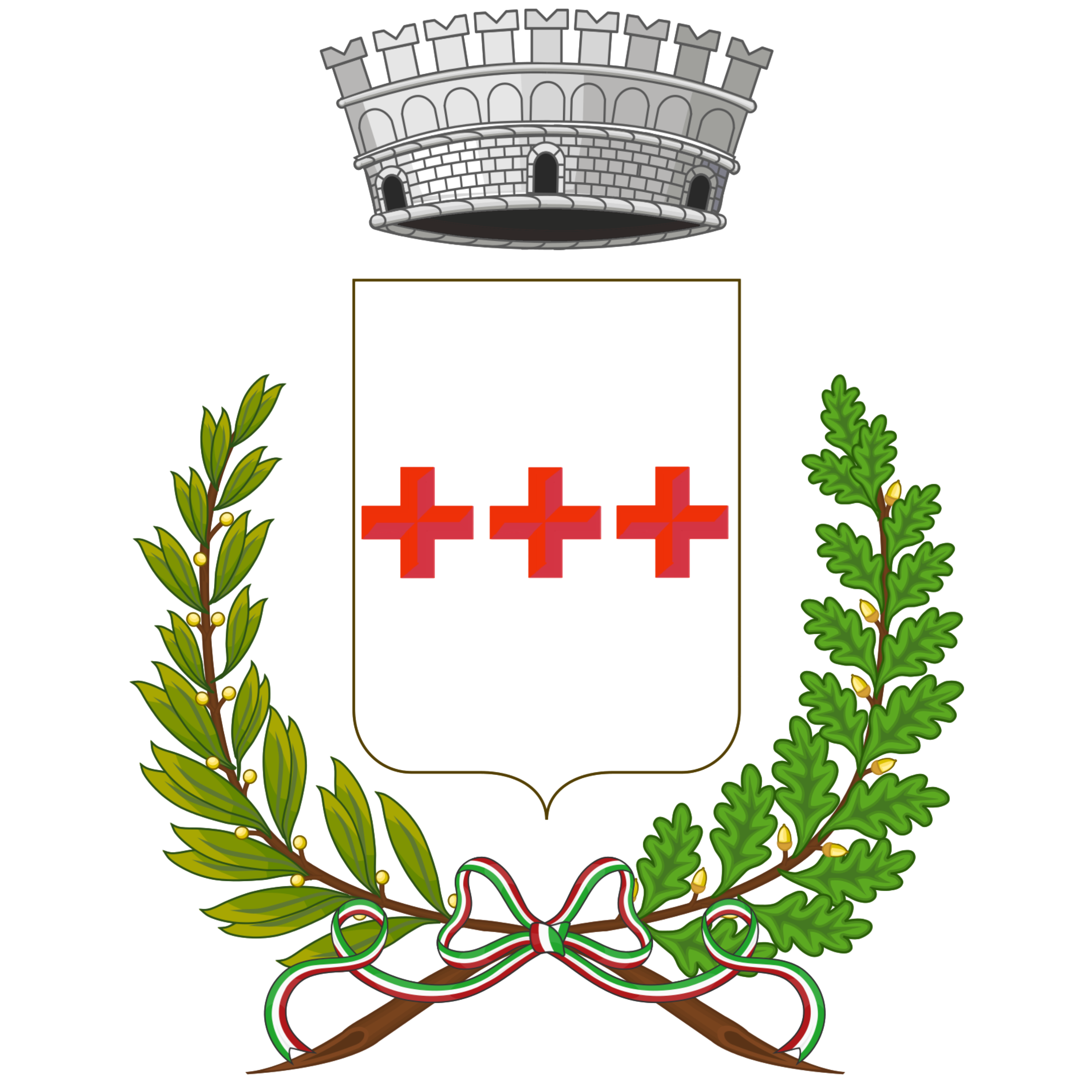
- Coat of arms

- Location within Italy Location within Lombardy
- Coordinates: 46°10′N 9°23′E
- Country: Italy
- Region: Lombardy
- Province: Province of Como (CO)
- Frazioni: Albonico, Bugiallo, Dascio

Area
  - Total: 23.3 km^{2} (9.0 sq mi)

Population (Dec. 2004)
  - Total: 1,188
  - Density: 51.0/km^{2} (132/sq mi)
- Time zone: UTC+1 (CET)
  - Summer (DST): UTC+2 (CEST)
- Postal code: 22010
- Dialing code: 0344
- Website: Official website

Sorico (Comasco: Suregh [ˈsuːrek]) is a comune (municipality) in the Province of Como in the Italian region Lombardy, located about 80 kilometres (50 mi) north of Milan and about 45 kilometres (28 mi) northeast of Como. As of 31 December 2004, it had a population of 1,188 and an area of 23.3 square kilometres (9.0 mi^{2}).

The municipality of Sorico contains the frazioni (subdivisions, mainly villages and hamlets) Albonico, Bugiallo, and Dascio.

Sorico borders the following municipalities: Dubino, Gera Lario, Montemezzo, Novate Mezzola, Samolaco, Verceia.

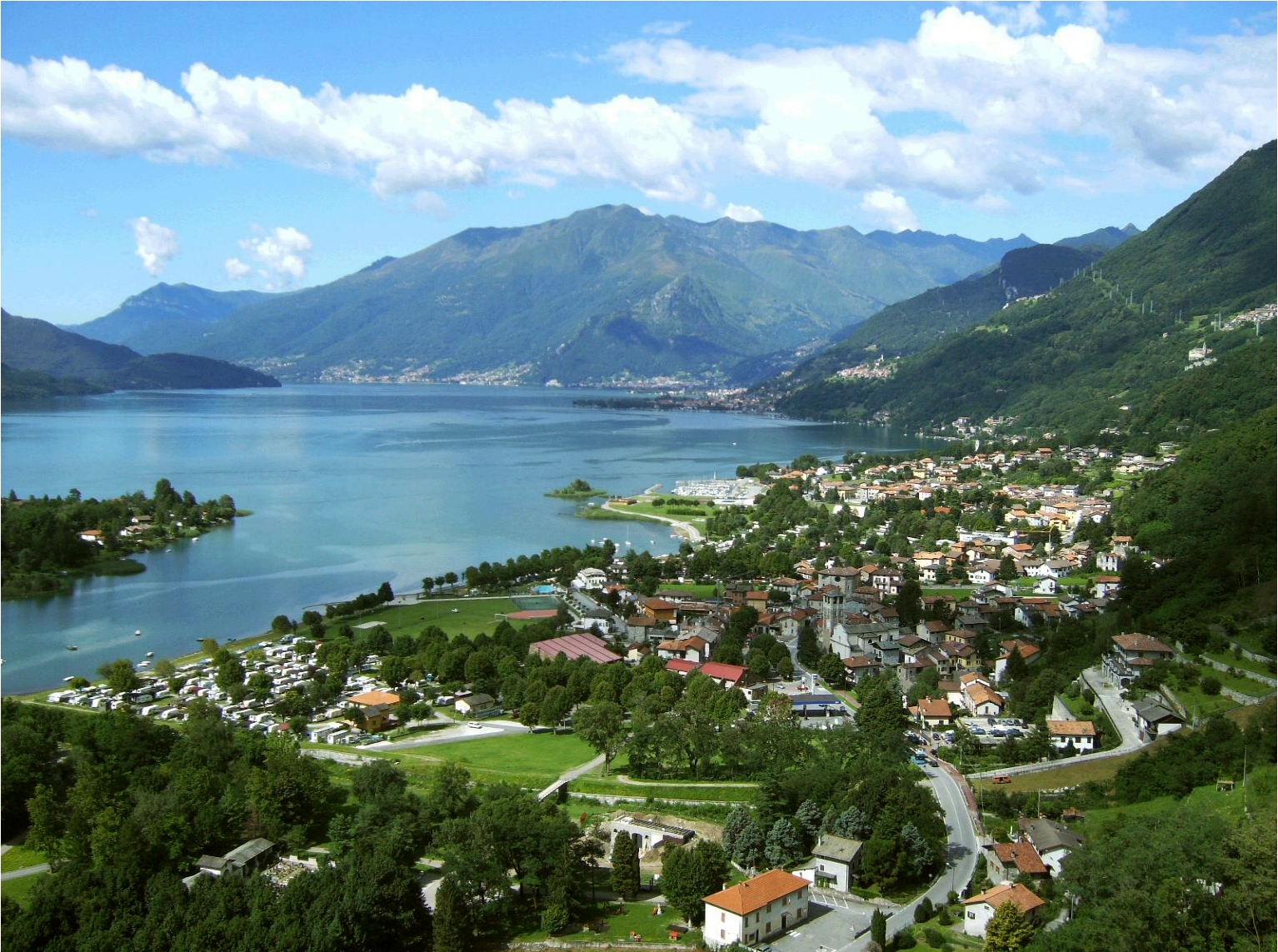
the town with the lake

== Demographic evolution ==
Historical population

Year	Pop.	±%
1861	1,210	—
1871	1,308	+8.1%
1881	1,239	−5.3%
1901	1,127	−9.0%
1911	1,291	+14.6%

Year	Pop.	±%
1921	1,196	−7.4%
1931	1,166	−2.5%
1936	1,284	+10.1%
1951	1,344	+4.7%
1961	1,340	−0.3%

Year	Pop.	±%
1971	1,283	−4.3%
1981	1,209	−5.8%
1991	1,193	−1.3%
2001	1,204	+0.9%

Source: Data from ISTAT

== Transport and Tourism ==
Sorico is a stopping point on the bus service that links Como to Colico via the west side of Lake Como. It is the northern endpoint of the long-distance footpath, La Via dei Monti Lariani.
