= Verceia =

Verceia (verscei)
- Comune
- comune di Verceia
- Location within Italy Location within Lombardy
- Coordinates: 46°12′N 9°27′E
- Country: Italy
- Region: Lombardy
- Province: Province of Sondrio (SO)

Area
  - Total: 11.2 km^{2} (4.3 sq mi)

Population (Dec. 2004)
  - Total: 1,101
  - Density: 98.3/km^{2} (255/sq mi)
- Time zone: UTC+1 (CET)
  - Summer (DST): UTC+2 (CEST)
- Postal code: 23020
- Dialing code: 0343

Verceia is a comune (municipality) in the Province of Sondrio in the Italian region Lombardy, located about 80 kilometres (50 mi) northeast of Milan and about 30 kilometres (19 mi) west of Sondrio. As of 31 December 2004, it had a population of 1,101 and an area of 11.2 square kilometres (4.3 mi^{2}).

Verceia borders the following municipalities: Dubino, Novate Mezzola, Sorico.

== Demographic evolution ==
Historical population

Year	Pop.	±%
1861	744	—
1871	790	+6.2%
1881	819	+3.7%
1901	893	+9.0%
1911	961	+7.6%

Year	Pop.	±%
1921	951	−1.0%
1931	884	−7.0%
1936	1,010	+14.3%
1951	940	−6.9%
1961	1,009	+7.3%

Year	Pop.	±%
1971	1,130	+12.0%
1981	1,244	+10.1%
1991	1,166	−6.3%
2001	1,116	−4.3%

Source: Data from ISTAT
