= Novate Mezzola =

- Comune
- Comune di Novate Mezzola
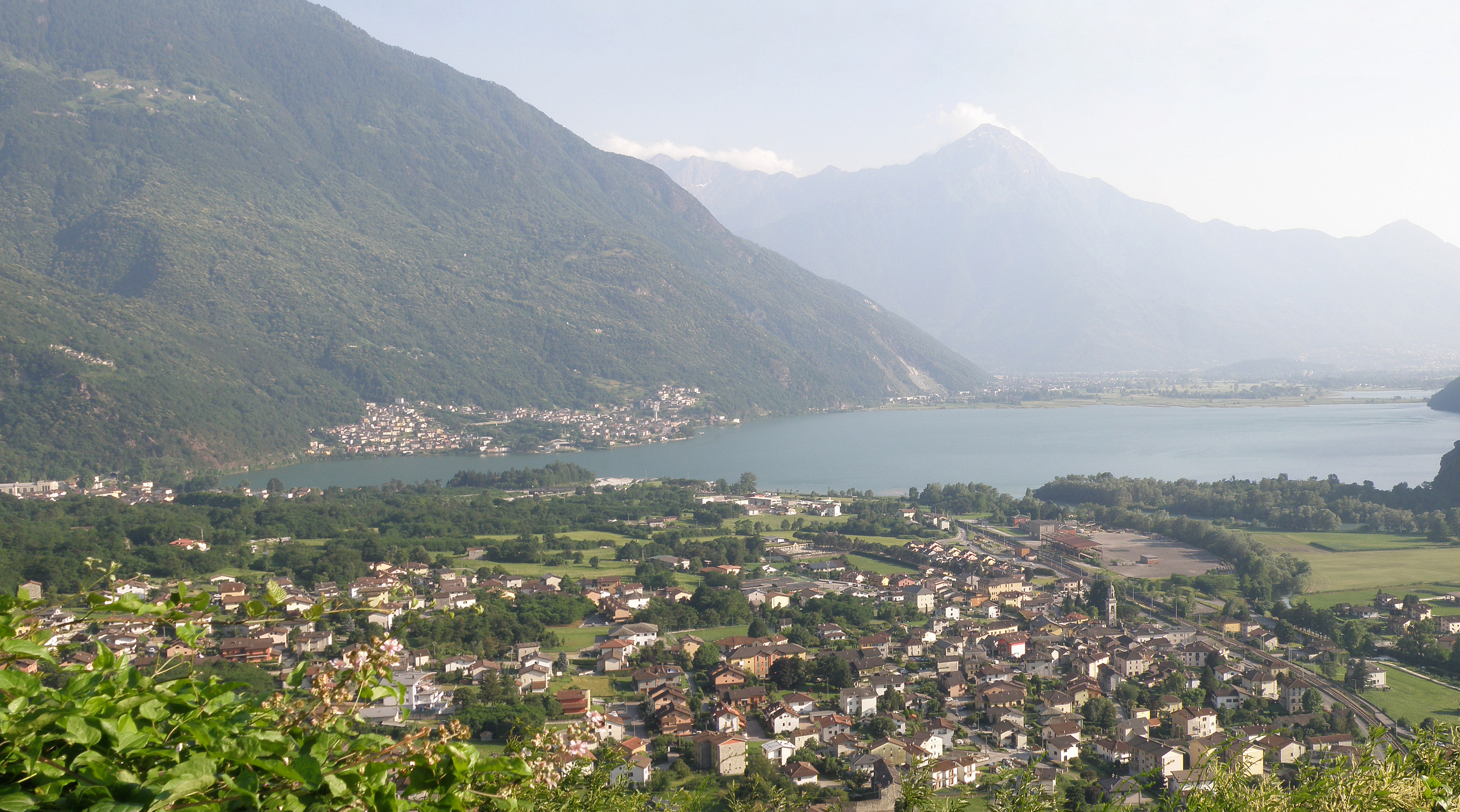

- Location within Italy Location within Lombardy
- Coordinates: 46°13′N 9°27′E
- Country: Italy
- Region: Lombardy
- Province: Province of Sondrio (SO)

Area
  - Total: 99.7 km^{2} (38.5 sq mi)

Population (Dec. 2004)
  - Total: 1,713
  - Density: 17.2/km^{2} (44.5/sq mi)
- Time zone: UTC+1 (CET)
  - Summer (DST): UTC+2 (CEST)
- Postal code: 23025
- Dialing code: 0343
- Website: Official website

Novate Mezzola is a comune (municipality) in the Province of Sondrio in the Italian region Lombardy, located about 90 kilometres (56 mi) north of Milan and about 35 kilometres (22 mi) west of Sondrio, on the border with Switzerland. As of 31 December 2004, it had a population of 1,713 and an area of 99.7 square kilometres (38.5 mi^{2}).

Novate Mezzola borders the following municipalities: Bondo (Switzerland), Cercino, Cino, Civo, Dubino, Mello, Piuro, Prata Camportaccio, Samolaco, Sorico, Traona, Val Masino, Verceia, Villa di Chiavenna.

== Demographic evolution ==
Historical population

Year	Pop.	±%
1861	1,132	—
1871	1,171	+3.4%
1881	1,168	−0.3%
1901	1,120	−4.1%
1911	1,393	+24.4%

Year	Pop.	±%
1921	1,390	−0.2%
1931	1,471	+5.8%
1936	1,777	+20.8%
1951	1,636	−7.9%
1961	1,724	+5.4%

Year	Pop.	±%
1971	1,864	+8.1%
1981	1,617	−13.3%
1991	1,677	+3.7%
2001	1,645	−1.9%

Source: Data from ISTAT
