= List of municipalities of the province of Mantua =

The following is a list of the 64 municipalities (comuni) of the Province of Mantua in the region of Lombardy in Italy.

== List ==
Municipality	Population (2026)	Area (km²)	Density
Acquanegra sul Chiese	2,722	28.01	97.2
Asola	9,870	73.48	134.3
Bagnolo San Vito	5,855	49.20	119.0
Borgo Mantovano	5,379	41.17	130.7
Borgo Virgilio	15,052	69.99	215.1
Borgocarbonara	1,872	30.50	61.4
Bozzolo	4,081	18.82	216.8
Canneto sull'Oglio	4,445	25.87	171.8
Casalmoro	2,216	13.70	161.8
Casaloldo	2,624	16.85	155.7
Casalromano	1,498	12.03	124.5
Castel d'Ario	4,663	22.58	206.5
Castel Goffredo	12,732	42.40	300.3
Castelbelforte	3,381	22.34	151.3
Castellucchio	5,161	46.34	111.4
Castiglione delle Stiviere	23,950	42.02	570.0
Cavriana	3,654	36.91	99.0
Ceresara	2,465	37.31	66.1
Commessaggio	1,022	11.65	87.7
Curtatone	14,691	67.47	217.7
Dosolo	3,155	25.54	123.5
Gazoldo degli Ippoliti	3,046	13.03	233.8
Gazzuolo	2,035	22.49	90.5
Goito	10,135	79.22	127.9
Gonzaga	8,574	49.89	171.9
Guidizzolo	6,045	22.38	270.1
Magnacavallo	1,399	28.20	49.6
Mantua	50,215	63.81	786.9
Marcaria	6,338	89.79	70.6
Mariana Mantovana	794	8.91	89.1
Marmirolo	7,653	42.02	182.1
Medole	4,243	25.73	164.9
Moglia	5,394	31.85	169.4
Monzambano	4,805	30.02	160.1
Motteggiana	2,408	24.79	97.1
Ostiglia	6,849	39.84	171.9
Pegognaga	6,972	46.57	149.7
Piubega	1,747	16.59	105.3
Poggio Rusco	6,255	42.29	147.9
Pomponesco	1,757	12.56	139.9
Ponti sul Mincio	2,277	11.72	194.3
Porto Mantovano	16,715	37.44	446.4
Quingentole	1,016	14.38	70.7
Quistello	5,281	45.44	116.2
Redondesco	1,188	19.04	62.4
Rivarolo Mantovano	2,302	25.55	90.1
Rodigo	5,174	41.61	124.3
Roncoferraro	6,935	63.43	109.3
Roverbella	8,714	62.99	138.3
Sabbioneta	4,076	37.27	109.4
San Benedetto Po	6,792	69.94	97.1
San Giacomo delle Segnate	1,508	15.98	94.4
San Giorgio Bigarello	11,958	51.53	232.1
San Giovanni del Dosso	1,244	15.40	80.8
San Martino dall'Argine	1,604	16.94	94.7
Schivenoglia	1,135	12.96	87.6
Sermide e Felonica	7,040	79.83	88.2
Serravalle a Po	1,474	26.20	56.3
Solferino	2,639	13.08	201.8
Sustinente	1,986	26.27	75.6
Suzzara	21,318	61.10	348.9
Viadana	19,787	103.84	190.6
Villimpenta	2,152	14.85	144.9
Volta Mantovana	7,248	50.49	143.6

== See also ==
- List of municipalities of Lombardy
- List of municipalities of Italy
