= Gazzo Veronese =

- Comune
- Comune di Gazzo Veronese
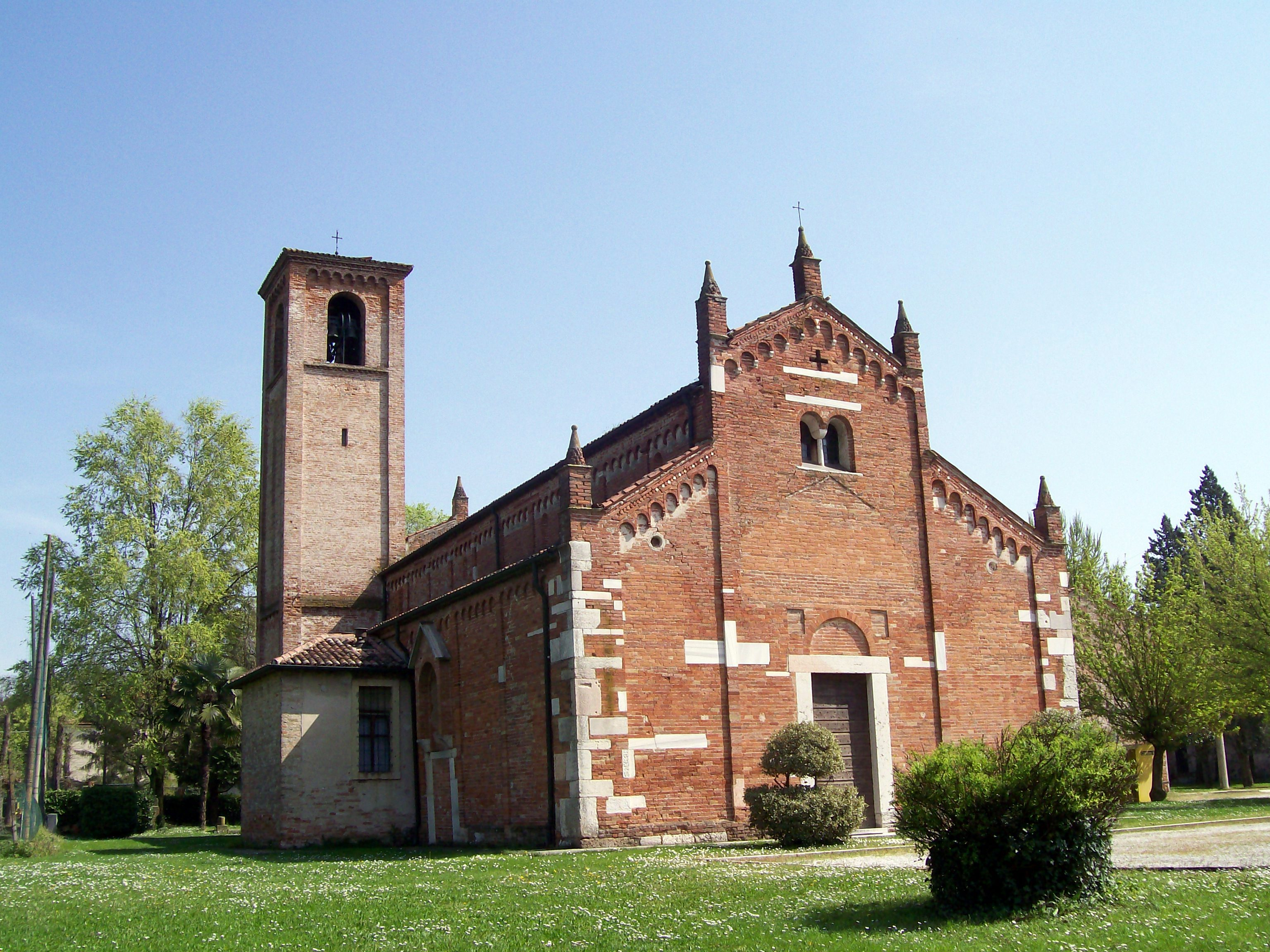
- Santa Maria Maggiore parish church

- Coat of arms

- Location within Italy Location within Veneto
- Coordinates: 45°9′N 11°5′E
- Country: Italy
- Region: Veneto
- Province: Verona (VR)
- Frazioni: Gazzo, Maccacari, Correzzo, Paglia, San Pietro in Valle, Pradelle, Roncanova

Government
  - Mayor: Stefano Negrini

Area
  - Total: 56.66 km^{2} (21.88 sq mi)
- Elevation: 16 m (52 ft)

Population (31 August 2017)
  - Total: 5,325
  - Density: 93.98/km^{2} (243.4/sq mi)
- Demonym: Gazzesi
- Time zone: UTC+1 (CET)
  - Summer (DST): UTC+2 (CEST)
- Postal code: 37060
- Dialing code: 0442
- Saint day: 5 August
- Website: Official website

Gazzo Veronese is a comune (municipality) in the Province of Verona in the Italian region Veneto, located about 100 km (62 mi) southwest of Venice and about 30 km (19 mi) south of Verona.

The position of the comune in the province of Verona.

Gazzo Veronese borders the following municipalities: Casaleone, Nogara, Ostiglia, Sanguinetto, Serravalle a Po, Sorgà, Sustinente and Villimpenta.

The economy is mostly based on agriculture.

== History ==
Gazzo's area was inhabited since the 4th millennium BC, but the modern settlement has Lombard origin. Its name derives in fact from the Lombard gahagi, meaning "wood". In Roman times it should be already populated, but the inhabitants fled with the fall of the Western Roman Empire. In the 9th century Benedictine monks of the Veronese church of Santa Maria in Organo dried the area. The fief was sold to Federico della Scala in 1307.

The current comune was created in 1929 by the merger of Gazzo and Correzzo, the municipal set being moved to the frazione of Roncanova in the occasion.

== Main sights ==
Main sights include

- the Romanesque 12th-century church of Santa Maria Maggiore, on the Tartaro river.

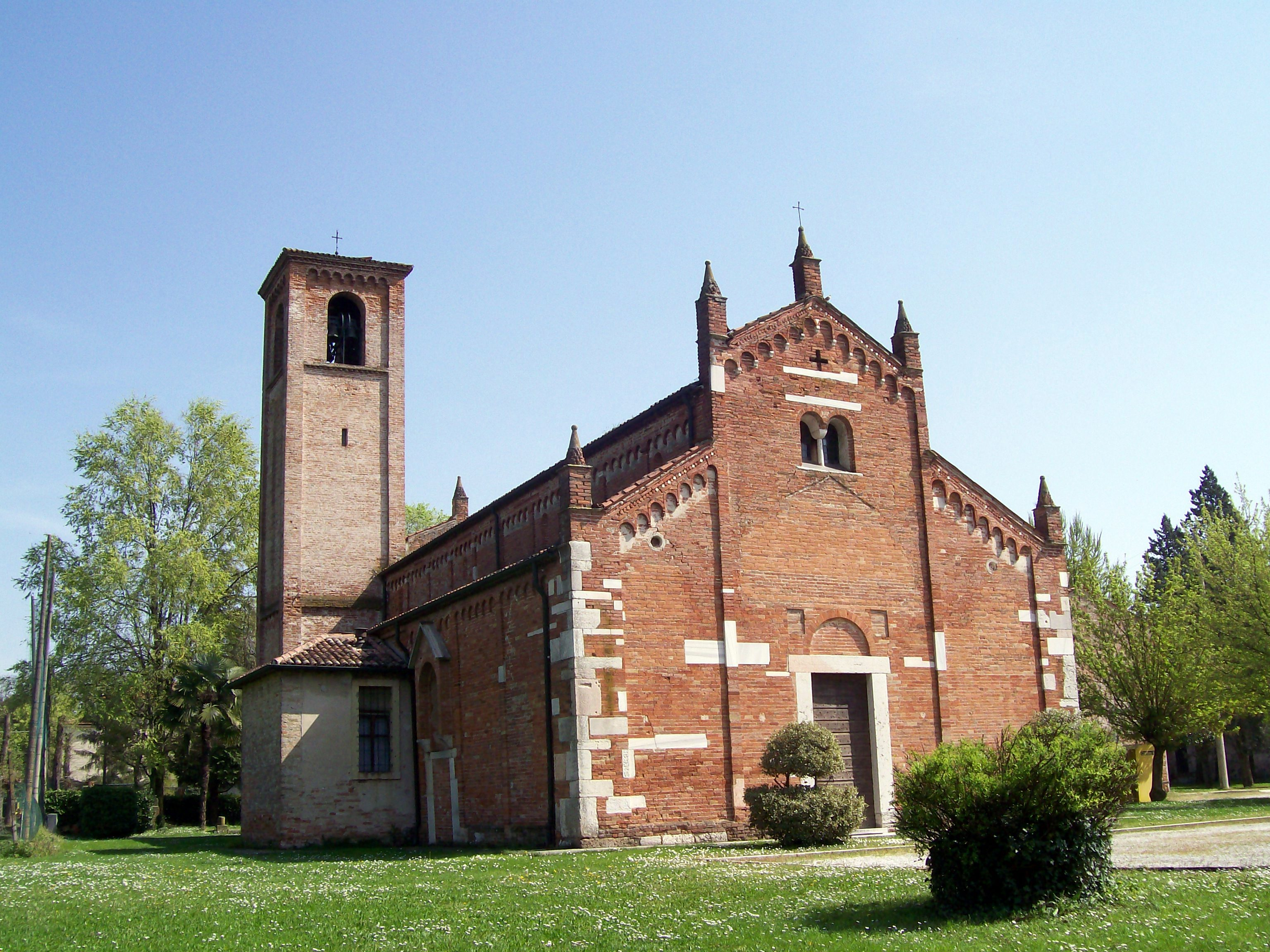
Santa Maria Maggiore in Gazzo

- The ruins of Gazzo Castle.
- Roman Tower (4th century AD).
- The church of San Pietro in Valle (commonly called Ceson, Venetian for Big Church), built around the 10th-11th century, in San Pietro in Valle.

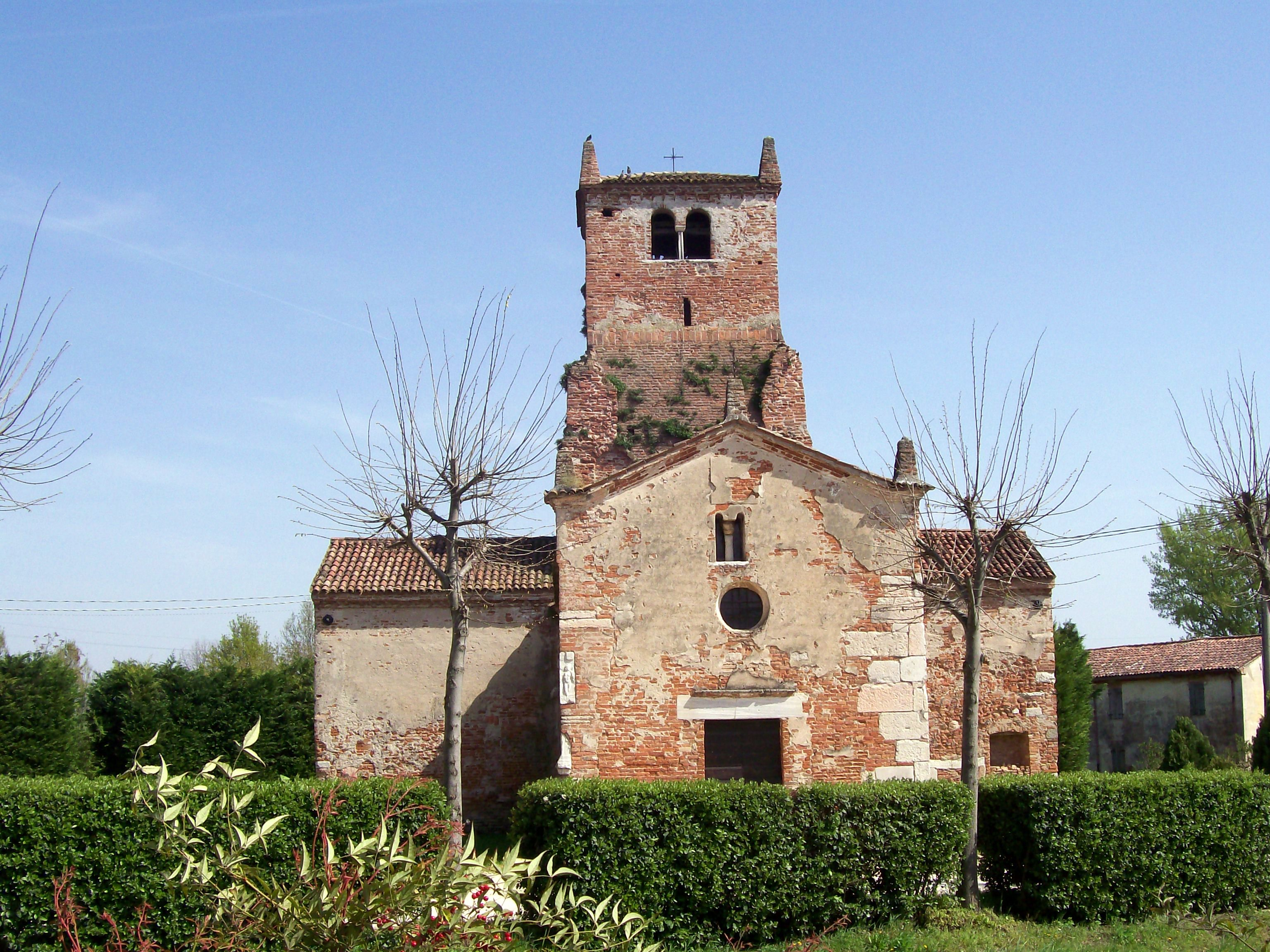
The Ceson in the countryside of San Pietro

- Church of San Prosdocimo, dating from the 15th century, in Pradelle.

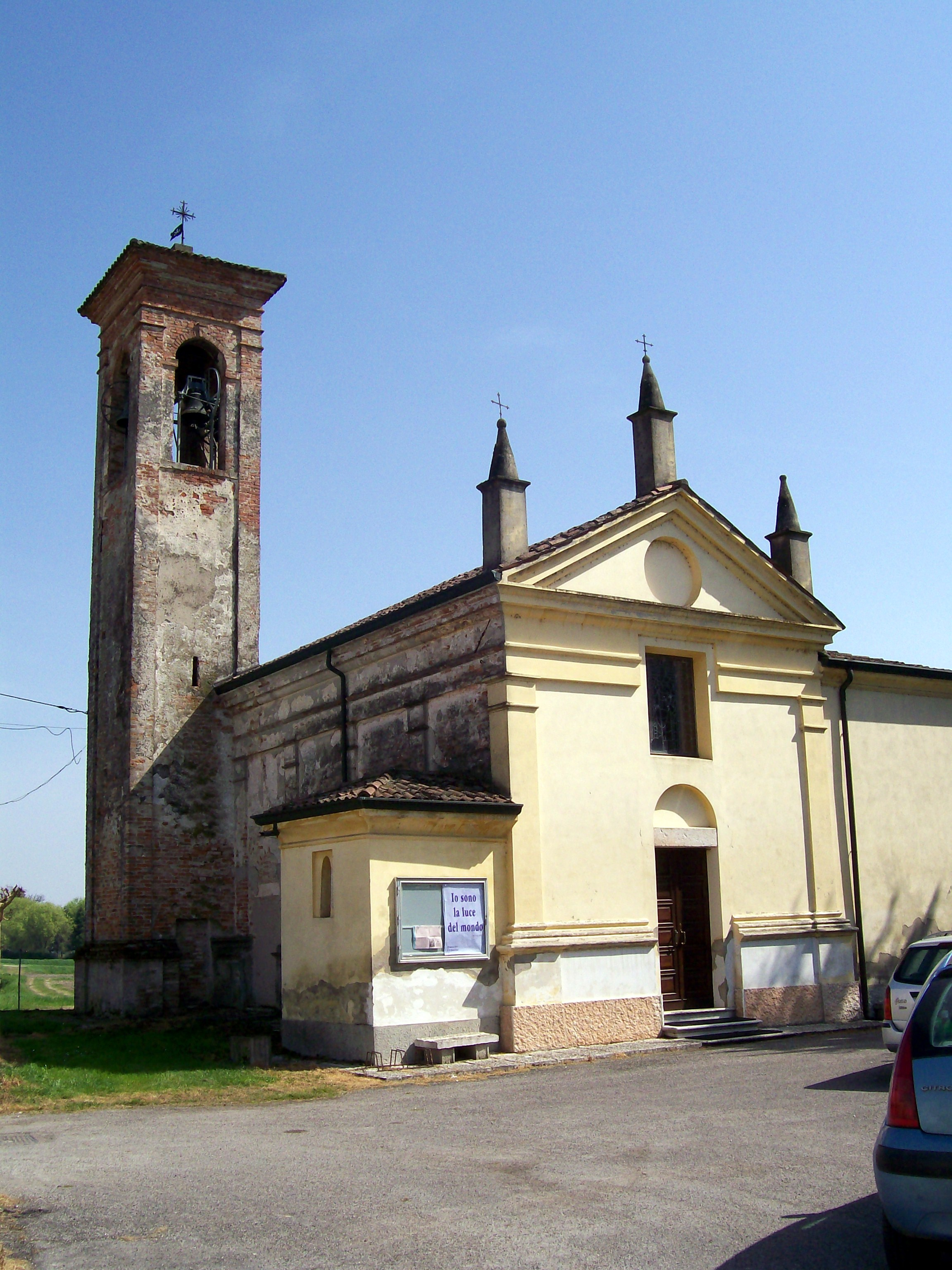
The Church of Pradelle

- Former church of San Giovanni Battista, in Correzzo. The church was built on a Roman cemetery, initially of Aryan worship, has been remodeled over the centuries. The last major renovation took place in 1685. It is currently abandoned.

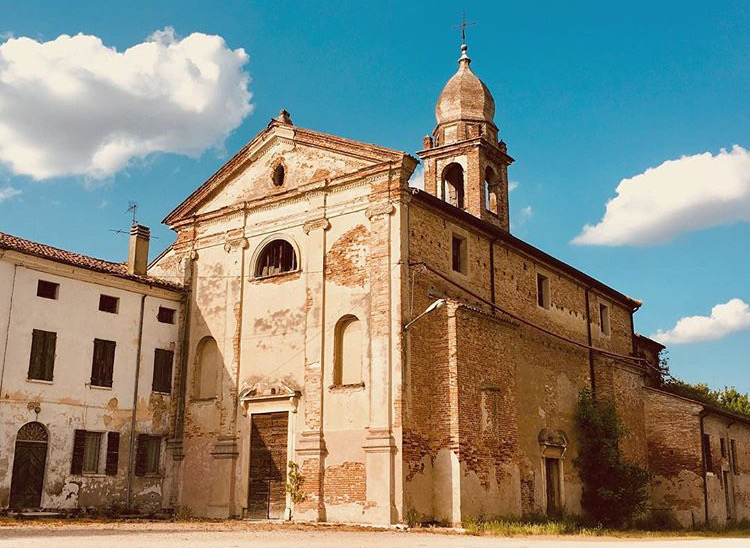
Former Church of San Giovanni Battista
