= Castel d'Ario =

Castel d'Ario Castlar (Emilian)
- Comune
- Comune di Castel d'Ario
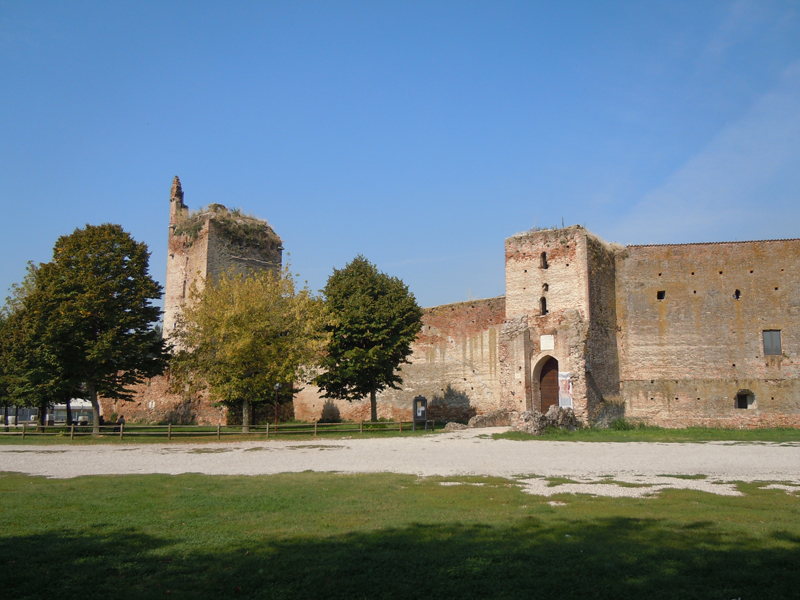
- Castle of Castel d'Ario

- Coat of arms

- Location within Italy Location within Lombardy
- Coordinates: 45°11′N 10°59′E
- Country: Italy
- Region: Lombardy
- Province: Mantua (MN)
- Frazioni: Gazzuolo I, Gazzuolo II, Madonnina, Roppi, Susano, Villa, Villagrossa

Government
  - Mayor: Daniela Castro

Area
  - Total: 22.58 km^{2} (8.72 sq mi)
- Elevation: 24 m (79 ft)

Population (31 May 2017)
  - Total: 4,635
  - Density: 205.3/km^{2} (531.6/sq mi)
- Demonym: Casteldariesi
- Time zone: UTC+1 (CET)
  - Summer (DST): UTC+2 (CEST)
- Postal code: 46033
- Dialing code: 0376
- Website: Official website

Castel d'Ario (Mantovano: Castlar) is a comune (municipality) in the Province of Mantua in the Italian region Lombardy, located about 150 kilometres (93 mi) east of Milan and about 15 kilometres (9 mi) east of Mantua. It was the birthplace of race car driver Tazio Nuvolari.

Castel d'Ario borders the following municipalities: Bigarello, Roncoferraro, Sorgà, Villimpenta.
