= Sustinente =

Sustinente Süstinént (Emilian)
- Comune
- Comune di Sustinente
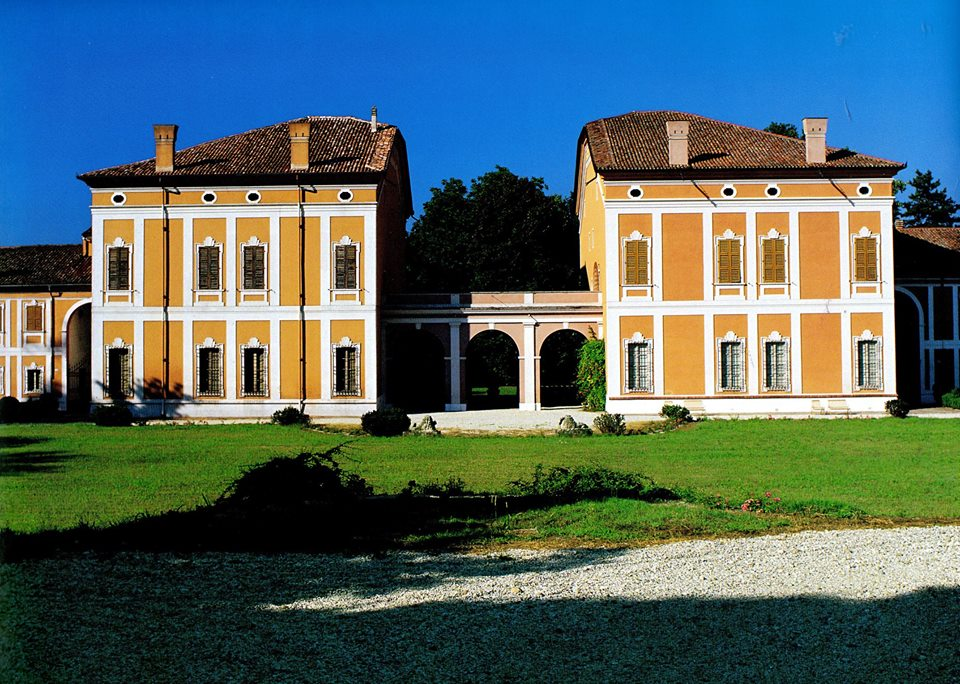

- Coat of arms

- Location within Italy Location within Lombardy
- Coordinates: 45°5′N 10°53′E
- Country: Italy
- Region: Lombardy
- Province: Mantua (MN)
- Frazioni: Cà Vecchia, Sacchetta, Bastia, Caselle di Poletto

Government
  - Mayor: Michele Bertolini

Area
  - Total: 26.3 km^{2} (10.2 sq mi)
- Elevation: 17 m (56 ft)

Population (31 December 2015)
  - Total: 2,109
  - Density: 80.2/km^{2} (208/sq mi)
- Demonym: Sustinentesi
- Time zone: UTC+1 (CET)
  - Summer (DST): UTC+2 (CEST)
- Postal code: 46030
- Dialing code: 0386
- Website: Official website

Sustinente (Mantovano: Süstinént) is a comune (municipality) in the Province of Mantua in the Italian region Lombardy, located about 140 kilometres (87 mi) southeast of Milan and about 11 kilometres (7 mi) southeast of Mantua.

Sustinente borders the following municipalities: Bagnolo San Vito, Gazzo Veronese, Quingentole, Quistello, Roncoferraro, San Benedetto Po, Serravalle a Po, Villimpenta.
