= Santa Maria Maggiore, Gazzo Veronese =

Coordinates: 45°8′23″N 11°4′34″E

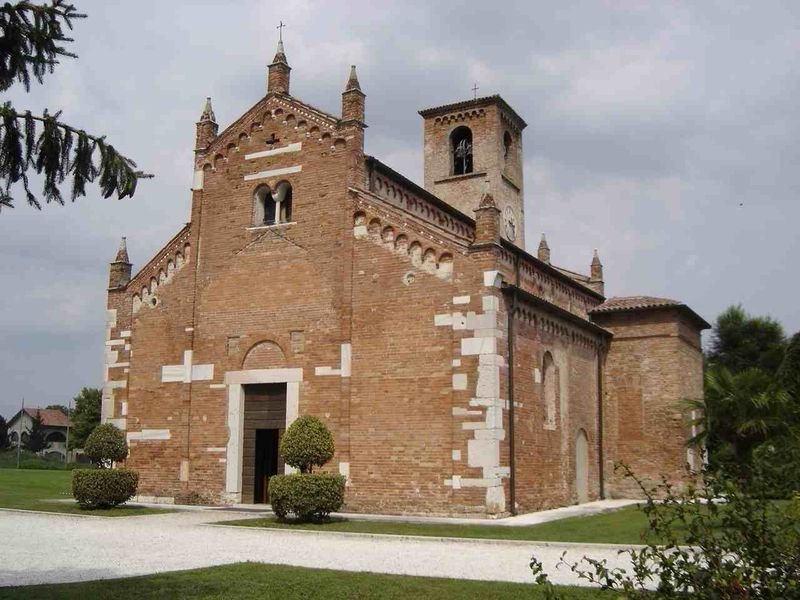
- Santa Maria Maggiore church exterior
- Santa Maria Maggiore, Gazzo Veronese
- Address: Piazza Gazzo 13, 37060 Gazzo Veronese
- Country: Italy
- Denomination: Roman Catholic

History
- Consecrated: 846

Administration
- Diocese: Verona

Santa Maria Maggiore is a church in Gazzo Veronese, a village near Verona, in the Veneto region of northern Italy.

== History ==
The church is first mentioned in the 9th century; an inscription on the exterior dates its consecration to August 20, 846. In 1117, an earthquake destroyed the first church, which was rebuilt in Romanesque style. During restorations in 1938-1940, 9th century mosaics were discovered under the current pavement. Another extensive restoration was carried on in the 15th century. The exterior pinnacles date from this period.
