= Castelbelforte =

- Comune
- Comune di Castelbelforte
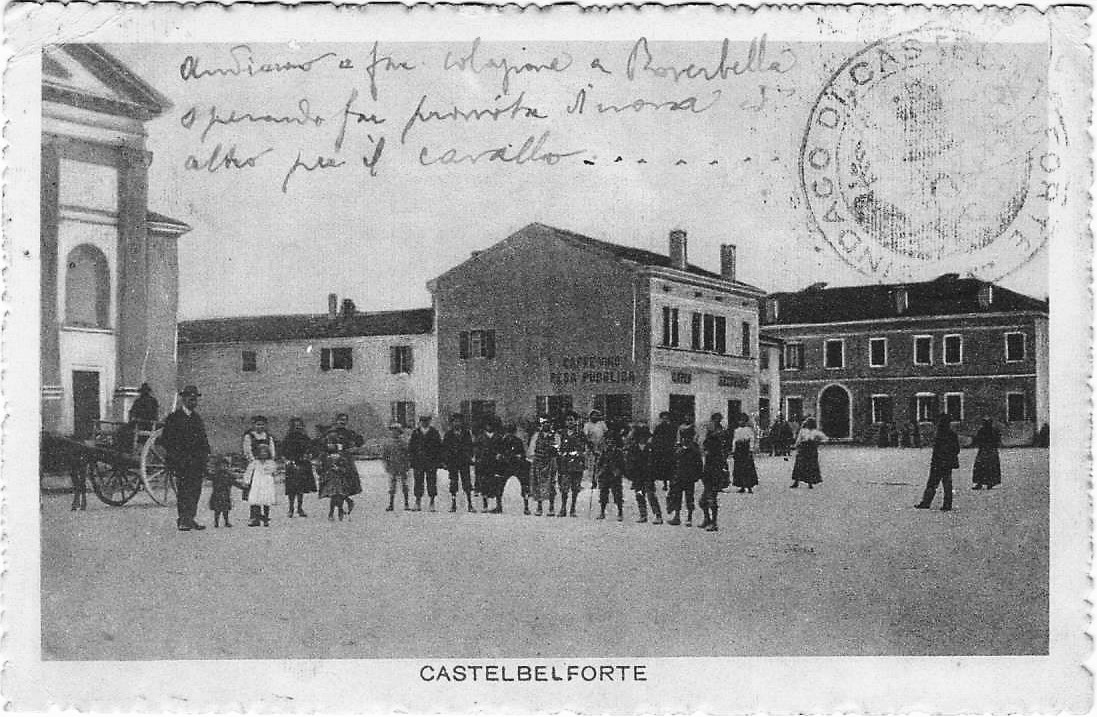

- Location within Italy Location within Lombardy
- Coordinates: 45°13′N 10°53′E
- Country: Italy
- Region: Lombardy
- Province: Province of Mantua (MN)

Area
  - Total: 22.3 km^{2} (8.6 sq mi)

Population (Dec. 2004)
  - Total: 2,636
  - Density: 118/km^{2} (306/sq mi)
- Time zone: UTC+1 (CET)
  - Summer (DST): UTC+2 (CEST)
- Postal code: 46032
- Dialing code: 0376

Castelbelforte (Mantovano: I Castei) is a comune (municipality) located in the Province of Mantua in the Italian region Lombardy. It is about 140 kilometres (87 mi) east of Milan and about 9 kilometres (6 mi) northeast of Mantua. As of 31 December 2004, it had a population of 2,636 and an area of 22.3 square kilometres (8.6 mi^{2}).

Castelbelforte borders the following municipalities: Bigarello, Erbè, Roverbella, San Giorgio di Mantova, Sorgà, Trevenzuolo.

== Demographic evolution ==
Historical population

Year	Pop.	±%
1861	?	—
1871	2,507	—
1881	2,737	+9.2%
1901	2,722	−0.5%
1911	2,874	+5.6%

Year	Pop.	±%
1921	3,089	+7.5%
1931	3,382	+9.5%
1936	3,526	+4.3%
1951	3,661	+3.8%
1961	2,964	−19.0%

Year	Pop.	±%
1971	2,519	−15.0%
1981	2,478	−1.6%
1991	2,542	+2.6%
2001	2,609	+2.6%

Source: Data from ISTAT
