= Villimpenta =

Villimpenta Vilimpénta (Emilian)
- Comune
- Comune di Villimpenta
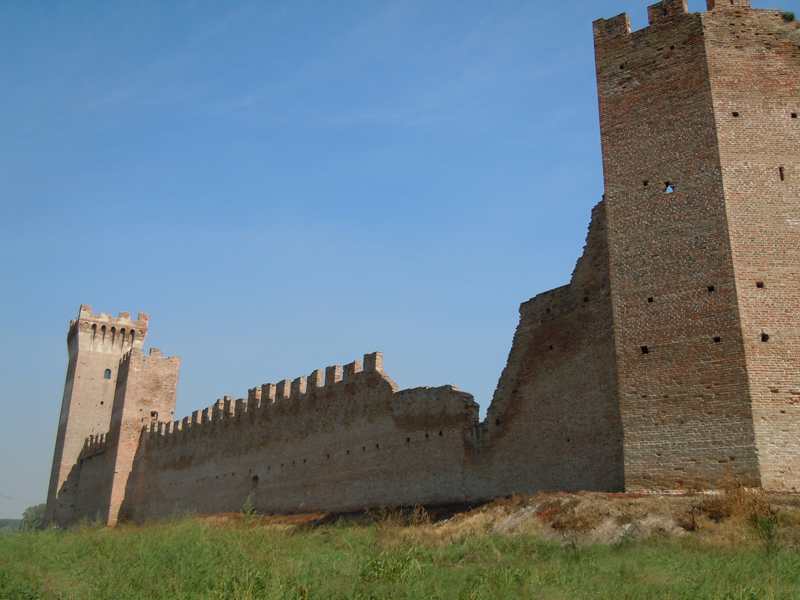
- Castle of Villimpenta.

- Coat of arms

- Location within Italy Location within Lombardy
- Coordinates: 45°9′N 11°2′E
- Country: Italy
- Region: Lombardy
- Province: Mantua (MN)
- Frazioni: Pradello

Government
  - Mayor: Fabrizio Avanzini

Area
  - Total: 14.85 km^{2} (5.73 sq mi)
- Elevation: 18 m (59 ft)

Population (31 December 2015)
  - Total: 2,186
  - Density: 147.2/km^{2} (381.3/sq mi)
- Demonym: Villimpentesi
- Time zone: UTC+1 (CET)
  - Summer (DST): UTC+2 (CEST)
- Postal code: 46039
- Dialing code: 0376
- Website: Official website

Villimpenta (Mantovano: Vilimpénta) is a comune (municipality) in the Province of Mantua in the Italian region Lombardy, located about 150 kilometres (93 mi) east of Milan and about 20 kilometres (12 mi) east of Mantua.

Villimpenta borders the municipalities of Castel d'Ario, Gazzo Veronese, Roncoferraro, Sorgà and Sustinente.

== Origins of the Name ==
The name may derive from Latin villapicta - which is a compound of villa (rural building surrounded by other houses and decorated) and the Latin adjective pictus, -a, -um (painted) through the form impincta.

== History ==
The town has remote origins and numerous archaeological findings which date back the settlement to the Neolithic and Bronze Age. The oldest mention dates back to 1047 and tells of a castellum in Villapicta owned by the Abbey of St Zeno of Verona, given by Emperor Henry III. Villimpenta was under the control of the Veronese house until 1243, when the Mantuans regained possession of the area, imprisoning the supporters of Ezzelino as well. During the 14th century, it passed under control of the Scaliger, the Visconti and on 23 January 1391, it definitively passed under the control of the Gonzaga with Francesco I Gonzaga, lord of Mantua, who purchased the area including the village and the ancient castle from Gian Galeazzo Visconti. The Gonzaga family ruled until 1708, the year of their fall. The village was plundered in 1618 and then 1796 by both French and Austrian troops.

== Sights and Tourist Attractions ==
- Scaliger Castle, 11th century
- Villa Gonzaga-Zani, 16th century, designed by Giulio Romano
- Parish church of San Michele Arcangelo, 18th century

== Culture ==
=== Museums ===
- Francioli Nuvolari Museum

=== Traditional events ===
In the town the so-called "Festa del Risotto" (Risotto Festival) takes place, twinned with ‘Sagra de la Volìa Cazzata’ (Fair of the pressed olive) of Martano (Lecce).
