= Schivenoglia =

Schivenoglia Schivnòia (Emilian)
- Comune
- Comune di Schivenoglia
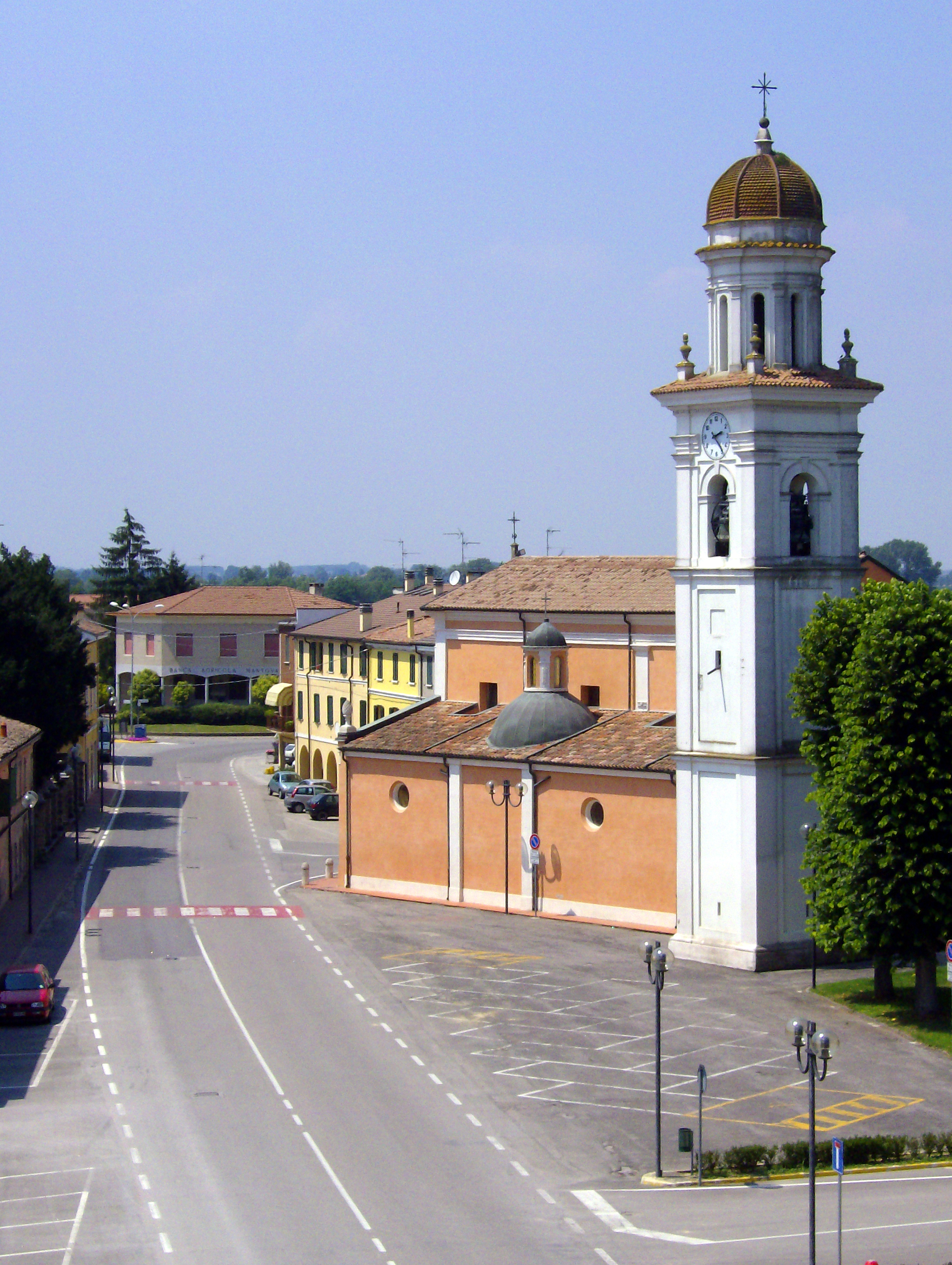

- Coat of arms

- Location within Italy Location within Lombardy
- Coordinates: 45°0′N 11°4′E
- Country: Italy
- Region: Lombardy
- Province: Mantua (MN)

Government
  - Mayor: Federica Stolfinati

Area
  - Total: 12.96 km^{2} (5.00 sq mi)
- Elevation: 12 m (39 ft)

Population (31 December 2015)
  - Total: 1,203
  - Density: 92.82/km^{2} (240.4/sq mi)
- Demonym: Schivenogliesi
- Time zone: UTC+1 (CET)
  - Summer (DST): UTC+2 (CEST)
- Postal code: 46020
- Dialing code: 0386

Schivenoglia (Lower Mantovano: Schivnòia) is a comune (municipality) in the Province of Mantua in the Italian region Lombardy, located about 160 kilometres (99 mi) southeast of Milan and about 30 kilometres (19 mi) southeast of Mantua.

Schivenoglia borders the following municipalities: Borgo Mantovano, Quingentole, Quistello, San Giovanni del Dosso.
