= San Giovanni del Dosso =

San Giovanni del Dosso San Giuàn dal Dòs (Emilian)
- Comune
- Comune di San Giovanni del Dosso
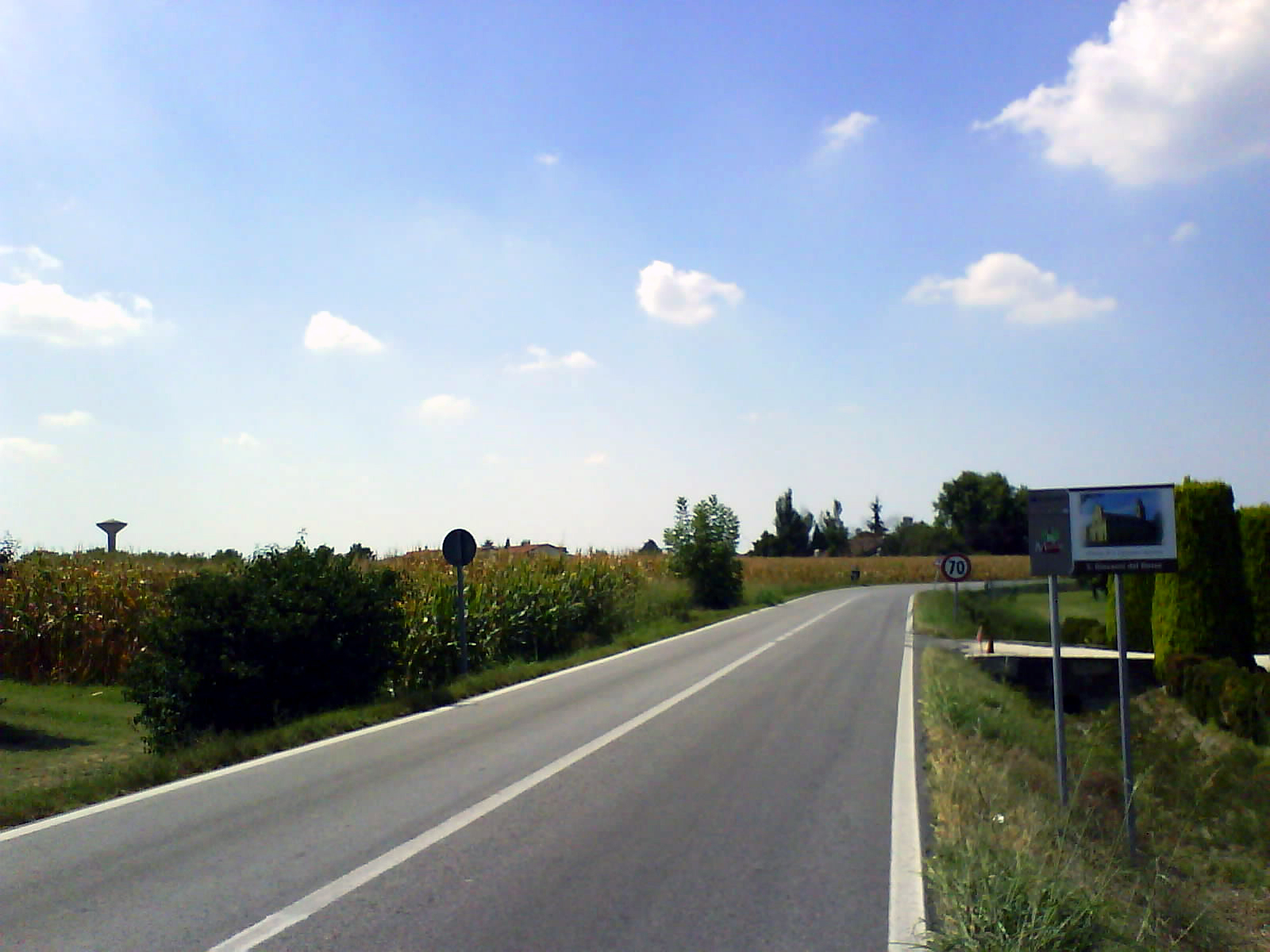
- Road near San Giovanni.

- Coat of arms

- Location within Italy Location within Lombardy
- Coordinates: 44°58′N 11°5′E
- Country: Italy
- Region: Lombardy
- Province: Mantua (MN)

Government
  - Mayor: Angela Zibordi

Area
  - Total: 15.4 km^{2} (5.9 sq mi)
- Elevation: 13 m (43 ft)

Population (30 November 2016)
  - Total: 1,261
  - Density: 81.9/km^{2} (212/sq mi)
- Demonym: Dossesi
- Time zone: UTC+1 (CET)
  - Summer (DST): UTC+2 (CEST)
- Postal code: 46020
- Dialing code: 0386
- Website: Official website

San Giovanni del Dosso (Lower Mantovano: San Giuàn dal Dòs) is a comune (municipality) in the Province of Mantua in the Italian region Lombardy, located about 160 kilometres (99 mi) southeast of Milan and about 30 kilometres (19 mi) southeast of Mantua.

San Giovanni del Dosso borders the following municipalities: Concordia sulla Secchia, Mirandola, Poggio Rusco, Quistello, San Giacomo delle Segnate, Schivenoglia, Borgo Mantovano.

The painter Dosso Dossi was a native of San Giovanni del Dosso.
