= Commessaggio =

Commessaggio Cumsas (Emilian)
- Comune
- Comune di Commessaggio
- Coat of arms

- Location within Italy Location within Lombardy
- Coordinates: 45°2′N 10°33′E
- Country: Italy
- Region: Lombardy
- Province: Mantua (MN)
- Frazioni: Bocca Chiavica

Government
  - Mayor: Alessandro Sarasini

Area
  - Total: 11.6 km^{2} (4.5 sq mi)

Population (2018-01-01)
  - Total: 1,160
  - Density: 100/km^{2} (259/sq mi)
- Time zone: UTC+1 (CET)
  - Summer (DST): UTC+2 (CEST)
- Postal code: 46010
- Dialing code: 0376

Commessaggio (Mantovano: Cumsas) is a comune (municipality) in the Province of Mantua in the Italian region Lombardy, located about 120 kilometres (75 mi) southeast of Milan and about 25 kilometres (16 mi) southwest of Mantua.

The municipality of Commessaggio contains the frazione (subdivision) Bocca Chiavica.

Commessaggio borders the following municipalities: Gazzuolo, Sabbioneta, Spineda, Viadana.

== Demographic evolution ==
Historical population

| Year | Pop. | ±% |
|---|---|---|
| 1861 | 1,477 | — |
| 1871 | 1,654 | +12.0% |
| 1881 | 1,634 | −1.2% |
| 1901 | 1,670 | +2.2% |
| 1911 | 1,782 | +6.7% |

| Year | Pop. | ±% |
|---|---|---|
| 1921 | 1,754 | −1.6% |
| 1931 | 1,803 | +2.8% |
| 1936 | 1,853 | +2.8% |
| 1951 | 1,753 | −5.4% |
| 1961 | 1,523 | −13.1% |

| Year | Pop. | ±% |
|---|---|---|
| 1971 | 1,299 | −14.7% |
| 1981 | 1,239 | −4.6% |
| 1991 | 1,160 | −6.4% |
| 2001 | 1,160 | +0.0% |

Source: Data from ISTAT
