= Ostiglia =

Ostiglia Ustìlia (Emilian)
- Comune
- Comune di Ostiglia
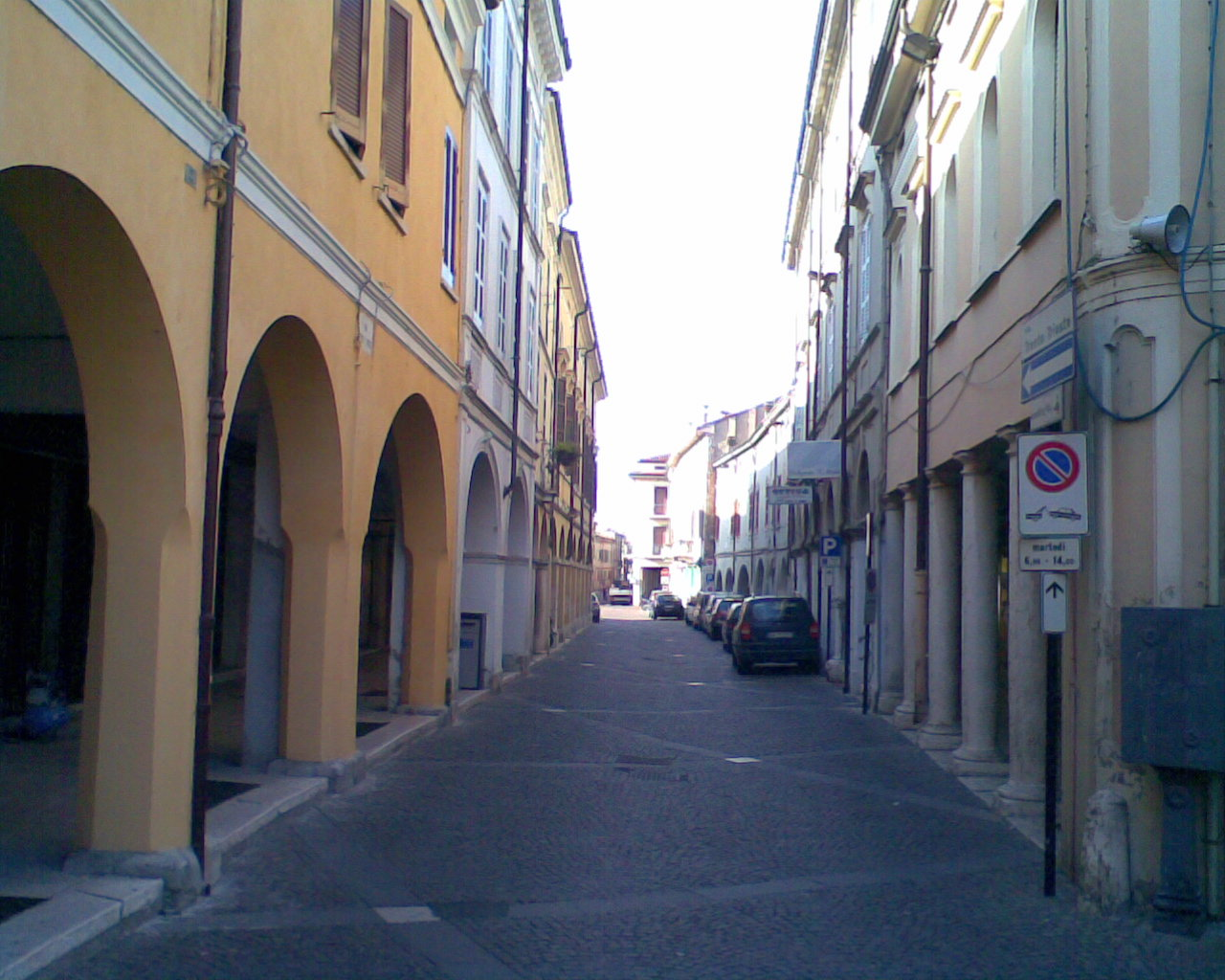

- Coat of arms

- Ostiglia within the Province of Mantua

- Location within Italy Location within Lombardy
- Coordinates: 45°4′N 11°8′E
- Country: Italy
- Region: Lombardy
- Province: Mantua (MN)
- Frazioni: Calandre, Correggioli, Comuna Bellis, Comuna Santuario, Ponte Molino

Government
  - Mayor: Umberto Mazza

Area
  - Total: 39.7 km^{2} (15.3 sq mi)
- Elevation: 13 m (43 ft)

Population (31 October 2010)
  - Total: 7,222
  - Density: 182/km^{2} (471/sq mi)
- Demonym: Ostigliesi
- Time zone: UTC+1 (CET)
  - Summer (DST): UTC+2 (CEST)
- Postal code: 46035
- Dialing code: 0386
- Website: Official website

Ostiglia (Mantovano: Ustìlia) is a comune (municipality) in the Province of Mantua in the Italian region Lombardy, located about 160 km (99 mi) southeast of Milan and about 30 km (19 mi) southeast of Mantua.

== History ==
In Roman times, Hostilia was a trade hub from Emilia to northern Europe, as it was located on the Via Claudia Augusta Padana. In the 1st century BC it was the birthplace of writer Cornelius Nepos. After the fall of the Western Roman Empire, it was ruled by the Ostrogoths, the Byzantines and, from the 6th century, by the Lombards. From 774 onwards it was part of the Frankish Empire.

In the Middle Ages it was a stronghold of Verona, which built here a castle in 1151. In 1308 it was a fief of the Scaliger, who were succeeded by the Visconti in 1381 and the Gonzaga in 1391. Ostiglia's history was subsequently connected with that of Mantua, losing its strategical importance; its castle was demolished by order of emperor Charles VI in 1717.

Arnoldo Mondadori Editore, the largest publisher in Italy, was founded at Ostiglia in 1907. During World War II, it was liberated by the 88th Infantry Division on 25 April 1945.

== Geography ==
Ostiglia borders with the following municipalities of Borgofranco sul Po, Casaleone, Cerea, Gazzo Veronese, Melara, Revere, Borgo Mantovano and Serravalle a Po.
