= Magnacavallo =

Magnacavallo Magnacavàl (Emilian)
- Comune
- Comune di Magnacavallo
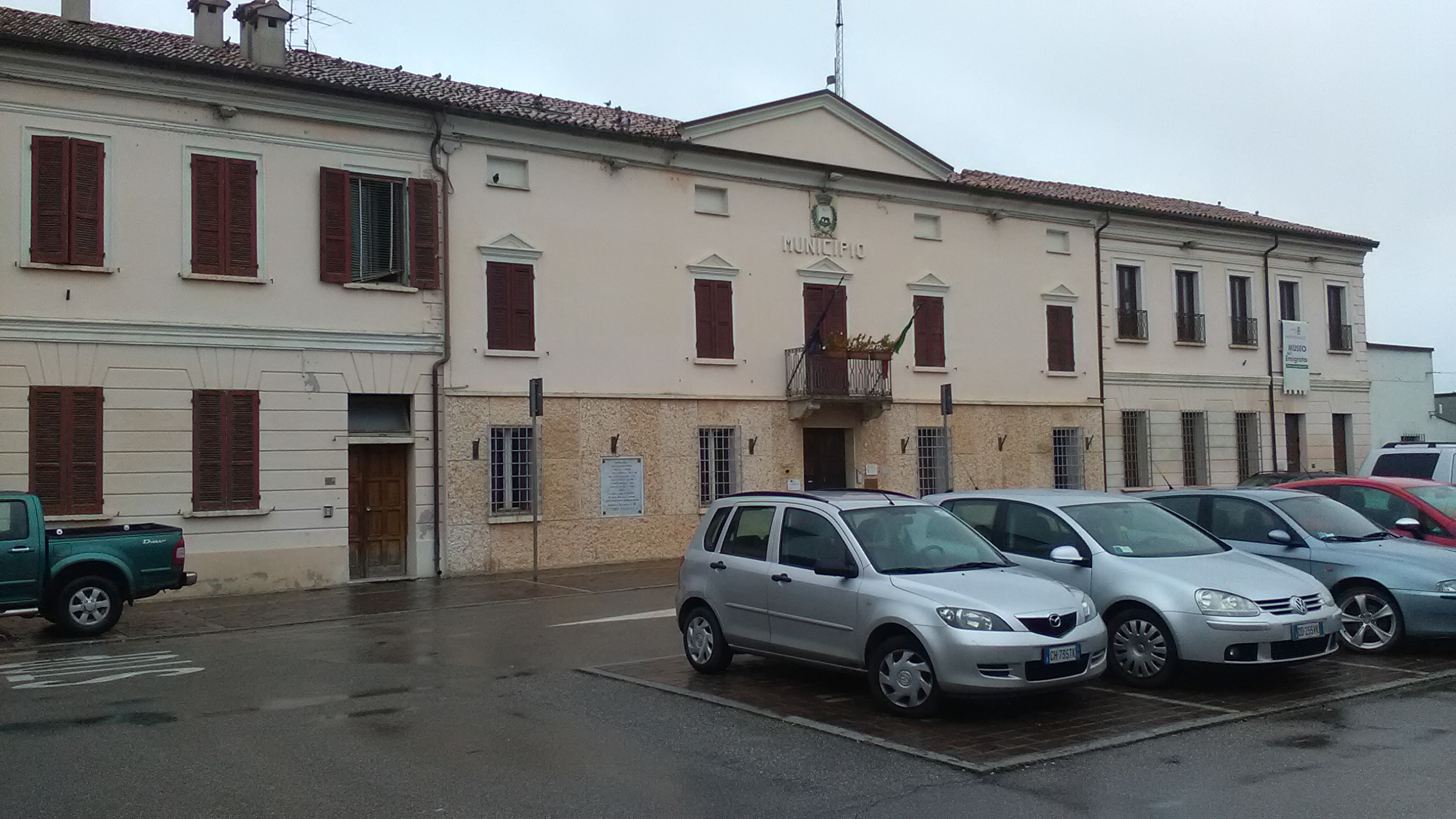
- Town hall.

- Coat of arms

- Location within Italy Location within Lombardy
- Coordinates: 45°0′N 11°11′E
- Country: Italy
- Region: Lombardy
- Province: Mantua (MN)
- Frazioni: Agnolo, Parolare, Vallazza

Government
  - Mayor: Arnaldo Marchetti

Area
  - Total: 28.2 km^{2} (10.9 sq mi)
- Elevation: 11 m (36 ft)

Population (30 September 2017)
  - Total: 1,511
  - Density: 53.6/km^{2} (139/sq mi)
- Demonym: Magnacavallesi
- Time zone: UTC+1 (CET)
  - Summer (DST): UTC+2 (CEST)
- Postal code: 46020
- Dialing code: 0386
- Website: Official website

Magnacavallo (Lower Mantovano: Magnacavàl) is a comune (municipality) in the Province of Mantua in the Italian region Lombardy, located about 170 kilometres (110 mi) southeast of Milan and about 45 kilometres (28 mi) southeast of Mantua.
