= Province of Mantua =

Province of Italy, located in the Lombardy region

Province of Mantua Provincia di Mantova (Italian) Pruvincia ad Mantua (Emilian)
- Province
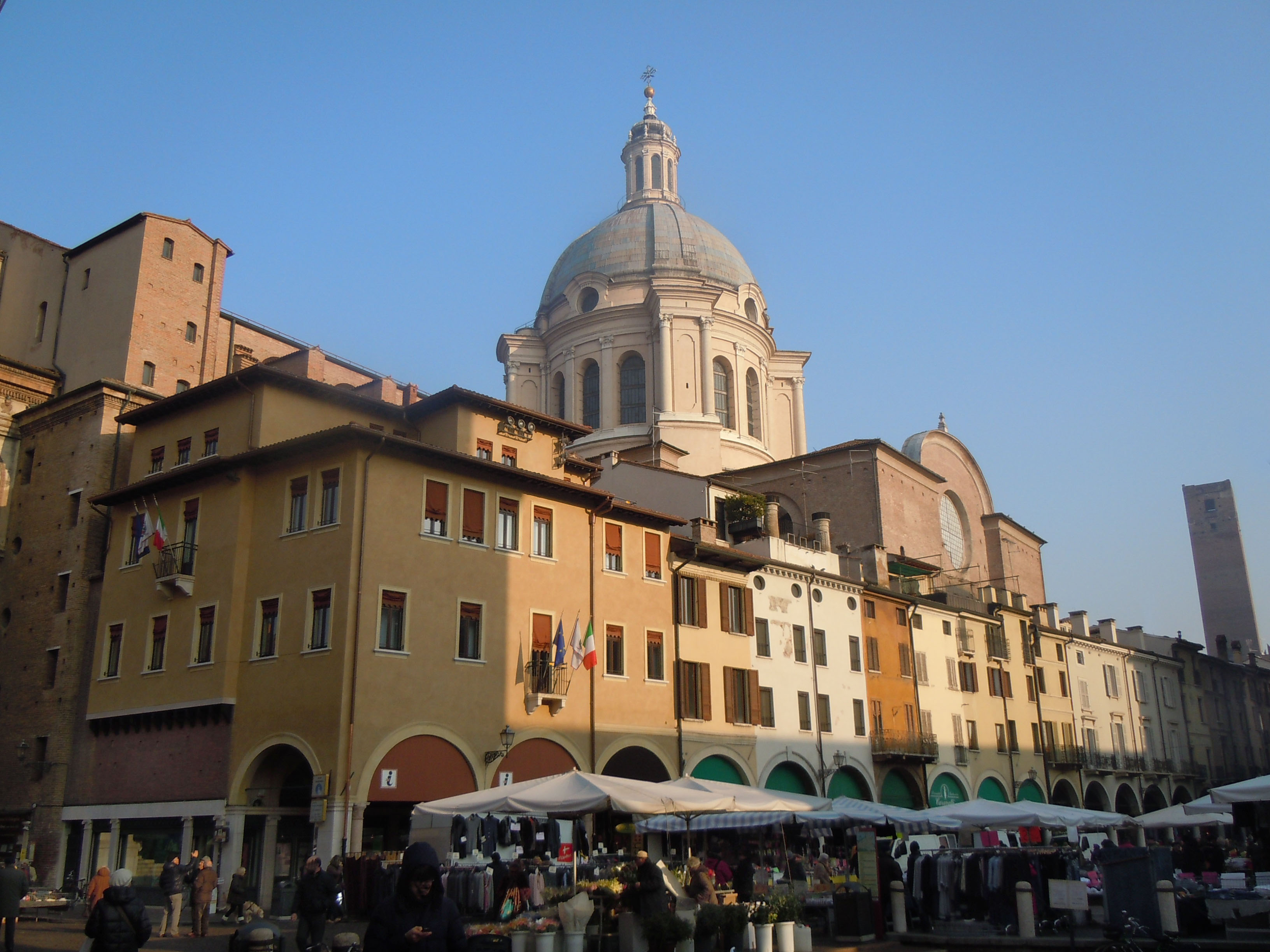
- Palazzo della Cervetta, the provincial seat

- Flag Coat of arms

- Location of the Province of Mantua in Italy
- Coordinates: 44°54′N 12°30′E
- Country: Italy
- Region: Lombardy
- Capital(s): Mantua
- Municipalities: 64

Government
  - President: Carlo Bottani

Area
  - Total: 2,341.44 km^{2} (904.04 sq mi)

Population (2026)
  - Total: 408,715
  - Density: 174.557/km^{2} (452.101/sq mi)

GDP
  - Total: €12.377 billion (2015)
  - Per capita: €29,904 (2015)
- Time zone: UTC+1 (CET)
  - Summer (DST): UTC+2 (CEST)
- ISO 3166 code: IT-MN
- Vehicle registration: MN
- ISTAT code: 020

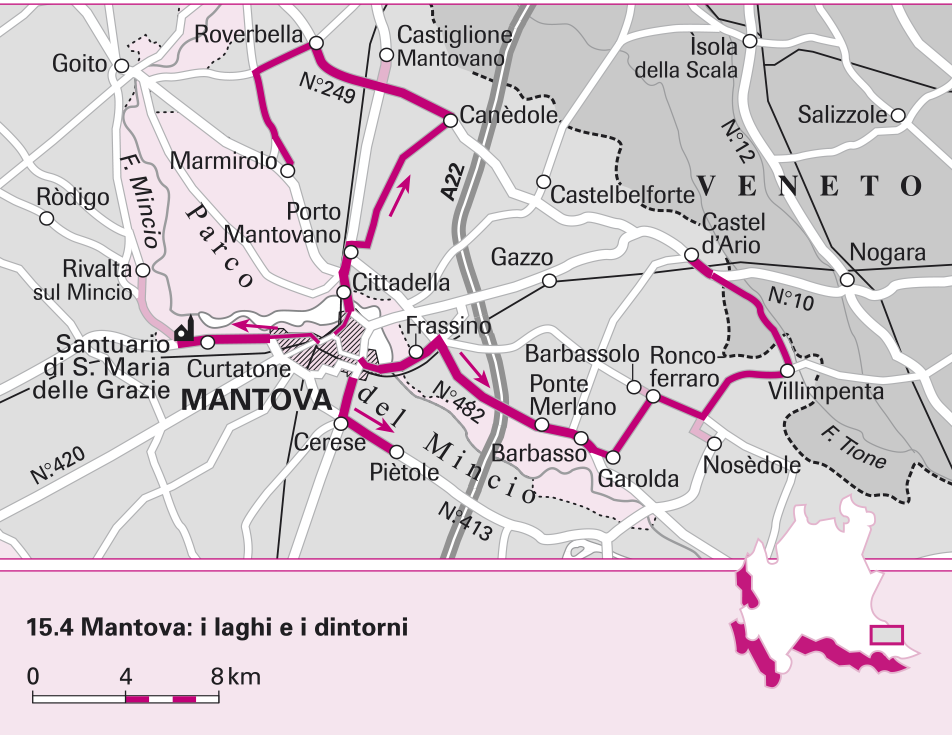
The lakes and surroundings of Mantua

The Province of Mantua (Italian: provincia di Mantova; Mantuan, Lower Mantuan: pruvincia ad Mantua; Upper Mantuan: pruinsa de Mantua) is a province in the region of Lombardy in Italy. Its capital is the city of Mantua.

The province is bordered to the north-east by the province of Verona, to the east by the province of Rovigo, to the south by the province of Ferrara, province of Modena, province of Reggio Emilia, and province of Parma, to the west by the province of Cremona, and to the north-west by the province of Brescia.

It has a population of 408,715 in an area of 2,341.44 square kilometres (904.04 sq mi) across its 64 municipalities.

== History ==
Founded in the tenth century BCE on the plain formed by meanders of the River Mincio, Mantua became an Etruscan town and important trading post for pottery and agricultural products. Despite its defensible position, it was unable to withstand the Celtic invaders in the sixth and fifth centuries BC who overwhelmed it, and the whole area was later conquered by the Romans.

By the fifth century CE, the Western Roman Empire was collapsing. Mantua was overrun by a series of invaders, including the Visigoths, Vandals, and Ostrogoths. After 568 the Lombards seized control of the part of northern Italy which is now known as Lombardy and included Mantua.

The current administrative boundaries of the province have deep historical roots, corresponding largely to the Duchy of Mantua, which was a fief of the Holy Roman Empire. The Napoleonic Department of the Mincio became the Province of Mantua at the birth of the Kingdom of Lombardy–Venetia in 1815. Following the Battle of Solferino on 24 June 1859, Franco-Piedmontese troops conquered Lombardy up to the right bank of the Mincio, and the resulting Armistice of Villafranca of 11 June 1859 between France and Austria called for the new provincial boundaries, splitting in two the part of the previous Province of Mantova that was crossed by the new international border. Following the Third Italian War of Independence all of Mantua passed to the Kingdom of Italy. The new provincial boundaries came into effect after laws enacted in 1868. The coat of arms of the province, containing the symbols of Mantua, Bozzolo and Castiglione delle Stiviere, embodies the union of those three areas and was adopted in place of the previous one.

== Geography ==
The Province of Mantua is bounded by several rivers. To the west, the River Oglio provides the border with the Province of Cremona. To the south it is bounded by the River Po, on the other side of which are the provinces of Ferrara, Modena, Reggio Emilia and Parma. To the east the River Mincio provides the border with the Province of Verona and the Province of Rovigo, and to the northwest lies the Province of Brescia. The total area of the province is 2,340 square kilometres (900 mi^{2}). The River Po is subject to flooding and much of the bank is raised by levees.

=== Nature ===
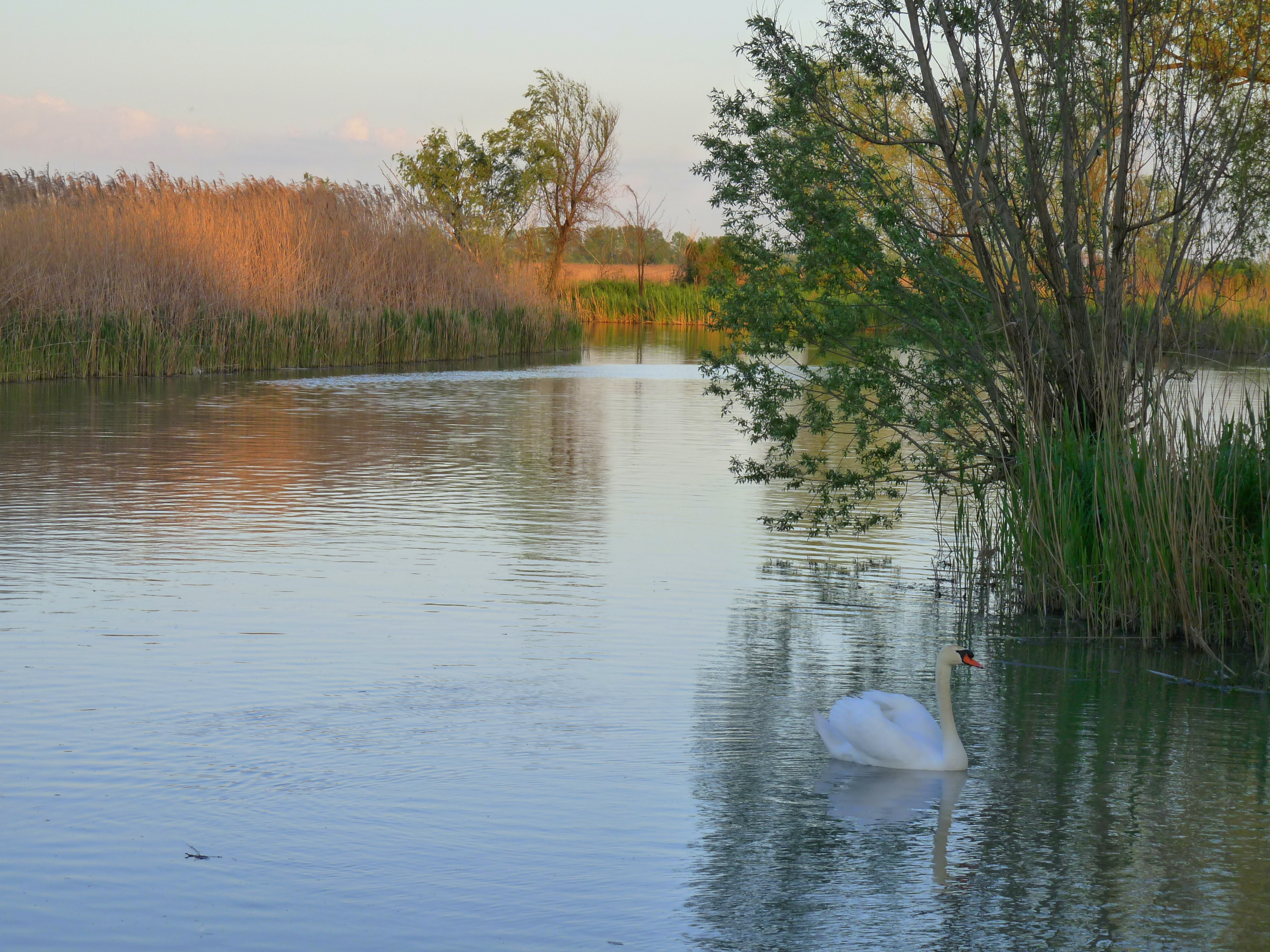
Mincio river in the countryside

There are a number of nature reserves and protected areas in the province. The Parco regionale del Mincio was established on 8 September 1984 with an area of approximately 16,000 hectares. It includes several nature reserves and has a range of habitats including moraines, hills, plains, and the meandering riverbeds in the complex of lakes of Mantua. Birds found in the park include storks, herons, purple herons, egrets, night herons, kingfishers, bee-eaters, coots, moorhens, peregrine falcons, hawks, great crested grebe and black kite.

The Parco dell'Oglio Sud is another regional park that lies on the boundary of the province with the province of Cremona. It was established in 1988 and has an area of about 12,800 hectares. It is a river park that runs along the stretch of the river Oglio which forms the boundary. It lies to the south of Lake Iseo and the administrative centre is at Calvatone. Birds present in this park include great egret, grey heron, Montagu's harrier, Eurasian scops owl, bearded reedling, woodcock, barred warbler, crested lark, sedge warbler, moustached warbler, little egret, Eurasian hobby and ferruginous duck.

The Riserva naturale Bosco Fontana is a state nature reserve with an area of about 23,300 hectares. It is a wooded area that is a remnant of the natural forests that covered the Po valley in ancient times. It is a dense marshy forest composed mainly of Turkey oaks, pedunculate oaks, hornbeams, limes, poplars, elms and alders, which are accompanied by numerous species of shrubby undergrowth. There are glades with abundant wildflowers and fungi flourish among the trees, an important factor being the richness of the groundwater. Among the mammals found in the reserve are the least weasel, beech marten and European polecat, and the birds include the common buzzard, the great spotted woodpecker and the Eurasian wryneck.

== Government ==
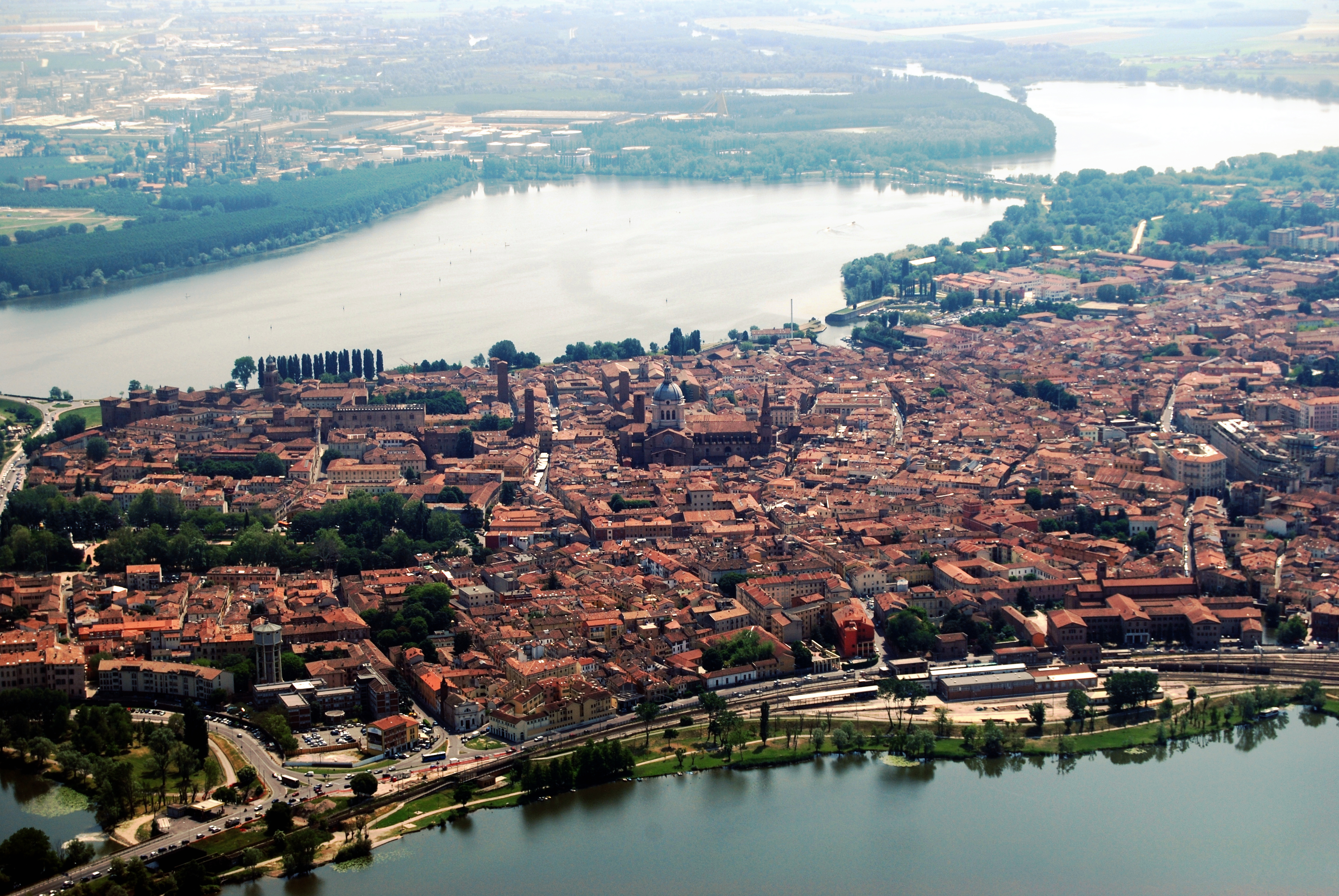

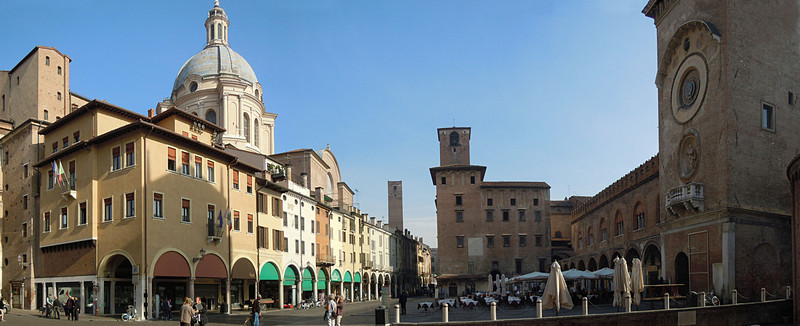
Mantua is the administrative center of the province where all the provincial institutions are seated.

Map of the province of Mantua

Map showing the 70 comuni of the province. The city of Mantua is shown in red.

The Province of Mantua is an administrative body of intermediate level between a municipality (comune) and Lombardy region.

The three main functions devolved to the Province of Mantua are:

- local planning and zoning;
- provision of local police and fire services;
- transportation regulation (car registration, maintenance of local roads, etc.).

As an administrative institution, the Province of Mantua has its own elected bodies. From 1948 to 1993 the President of the Province of Mantua was chosen by the members of the Provincial Council, elected every five years by citizens. From 1993 to 2016, under provisions of the 1993 local administration reform, the President of the Province was chosen by popular election, originally every four, then every five years.

On 3 April 2014, the Italian Chamber of Deputies gave its final approval to the Law n.56/2014 which involves the transformation of the Italian provinces into "institutional bodies of second level". According to the 2014 reform, each province is headed by a President (or Commissioner) assisted by a legislative body, the Provincial Council, and an executive body, the Provincial Executive. President (Commissioner) and members of Council are elected together by mayors and city councilors of each municipality of the province respectively every four and two years. The Executive is chaired by the President (Commissioner) who appoint others members, called assessori. Since 2016, the President (Commissioner) and other members of the Council do not receive a salary.

In each province, there is also a Prefect (prefetto), a representative of the central government who heads an agency called prefettura-ufficio territoriale del governo. The Questor (questore) is the head of State's Police (Polizia di Stato) in the province and his office is called questura. There is also a province's police force depending from local government, called provincial police (polizia provinciale).

=== List of presidents ===
This is a partial list of the Presidents of the Province since 1975:

| President | Term start | Term end | Party |
|---|---|---|---|
| Maurizio Lotti | 1975 | 1983 | PCI |
| Guido Contessa | 1983 | 1985 | PCI |
| Massimo Chiaventi | 1985 | 1993 | PCI |
| Davide Boni | 20 June 1993 | 12 May 1997 | LN |
| Tiziana Gualtieri | 12 May 1997 | 28 May 2001 | PPI |
| Maurizio Fontanili | 28 May 2001 | 30 May 2011 | PD |
| Alessandro Pastacci | 30 May 2011 | 31 August 2016 | PD |
| Beniamino Morselli (Note: Mayor of San Giorgio Bigarello.) | 31 August 2016 | 19 December 2021 | PD |
| Carlo Bottani (Note: Mayor of Curtatone.) | 19 December 2021 | Incumbent | Ind |

=== Municipalities ===
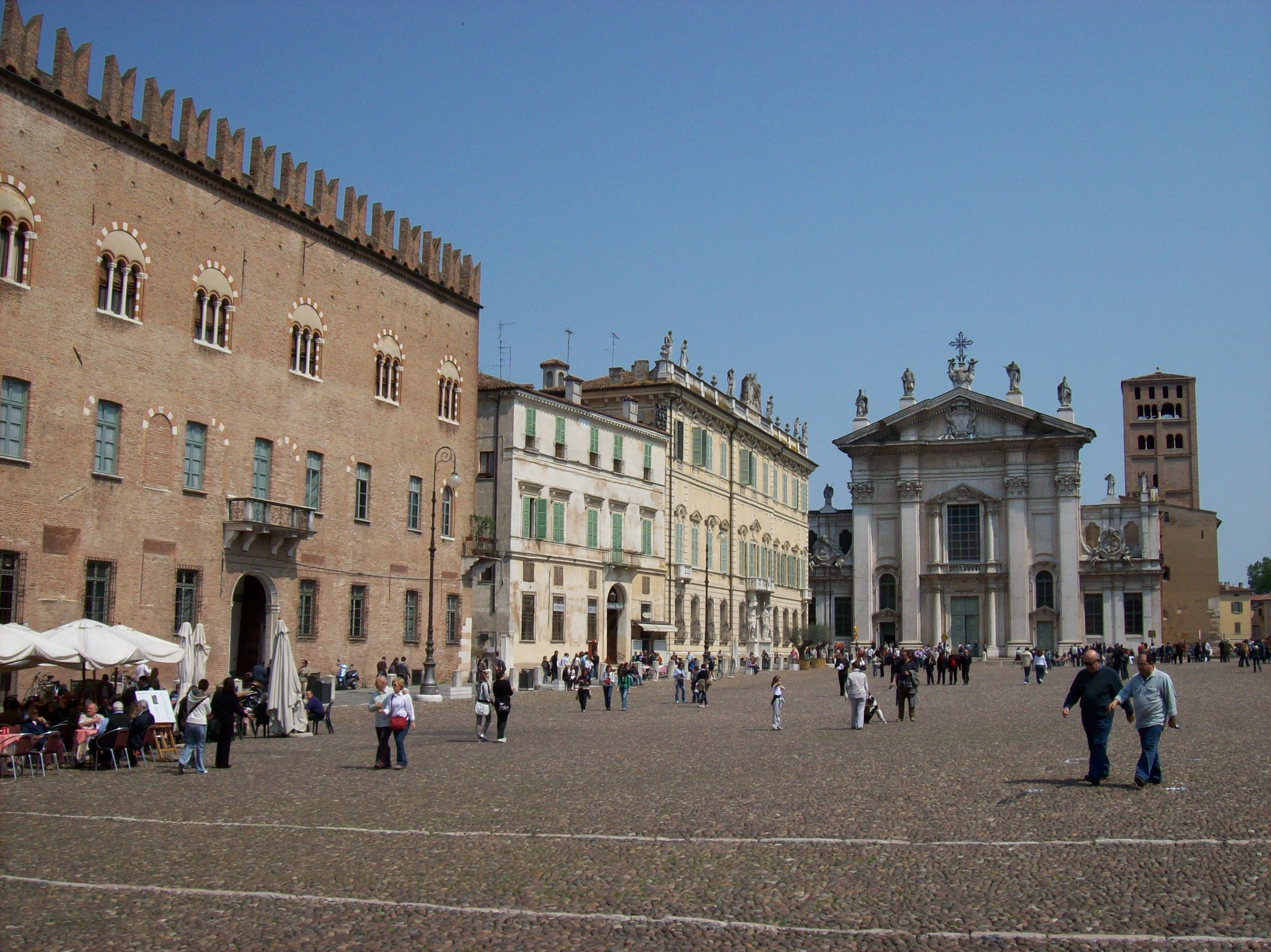
Mantua

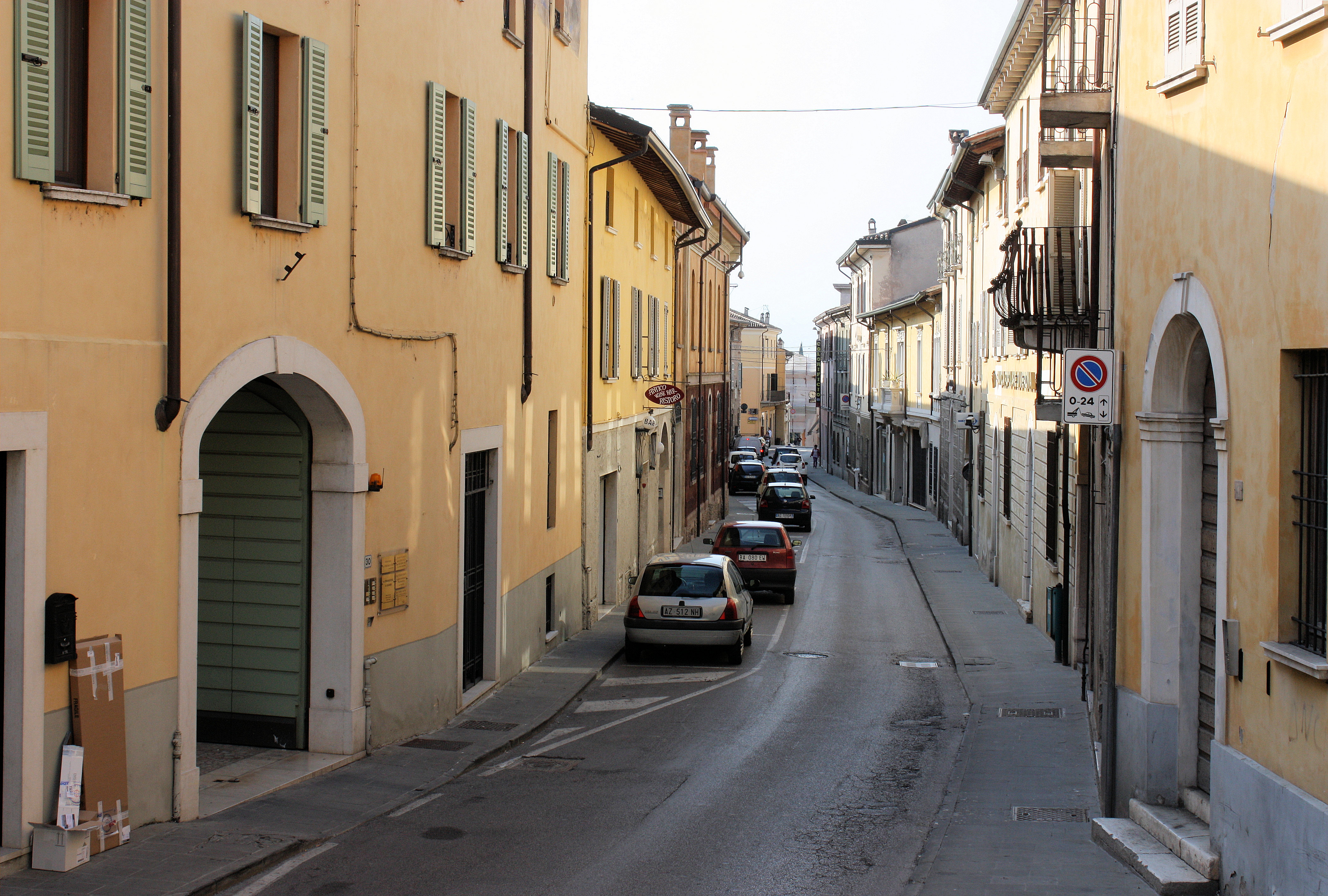
Castiglione delle Stiviere

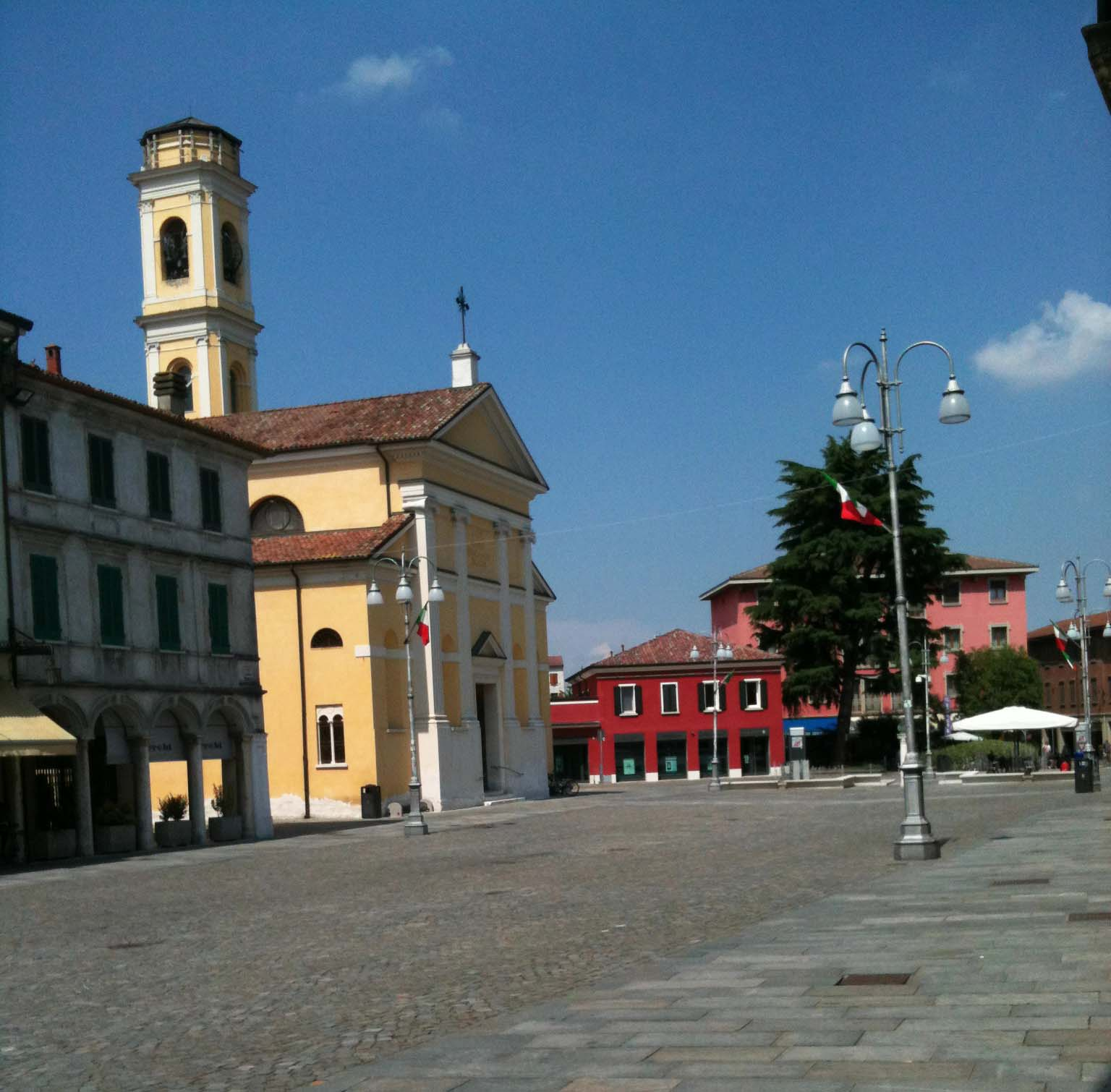
Suzzara

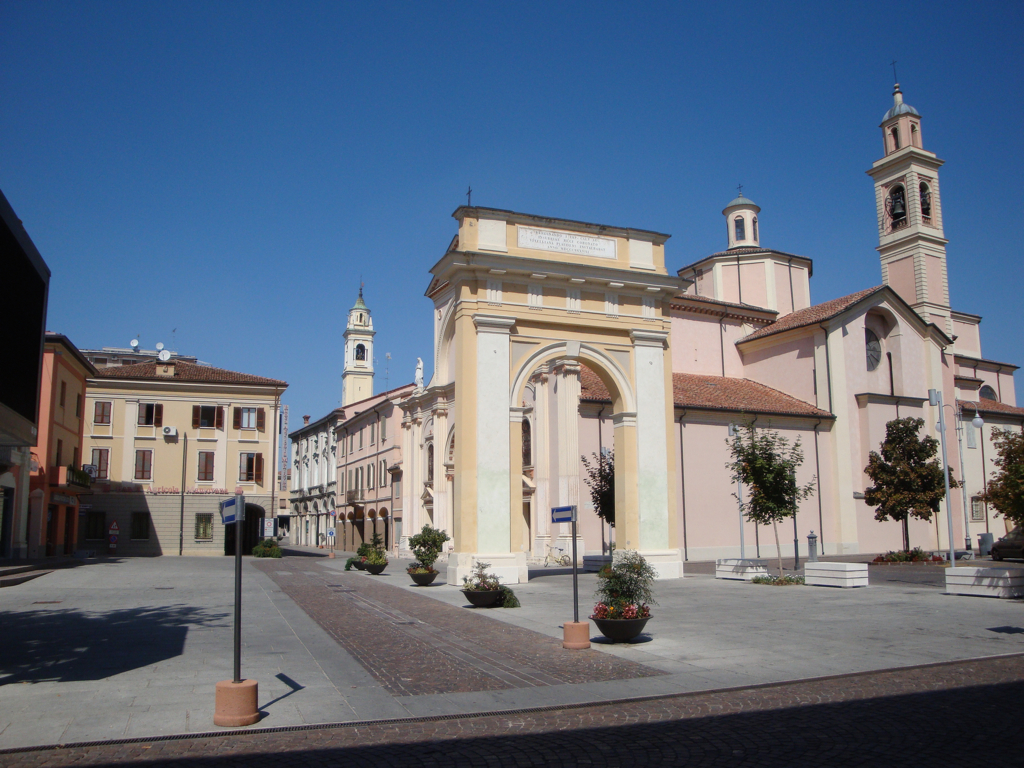
Viadana

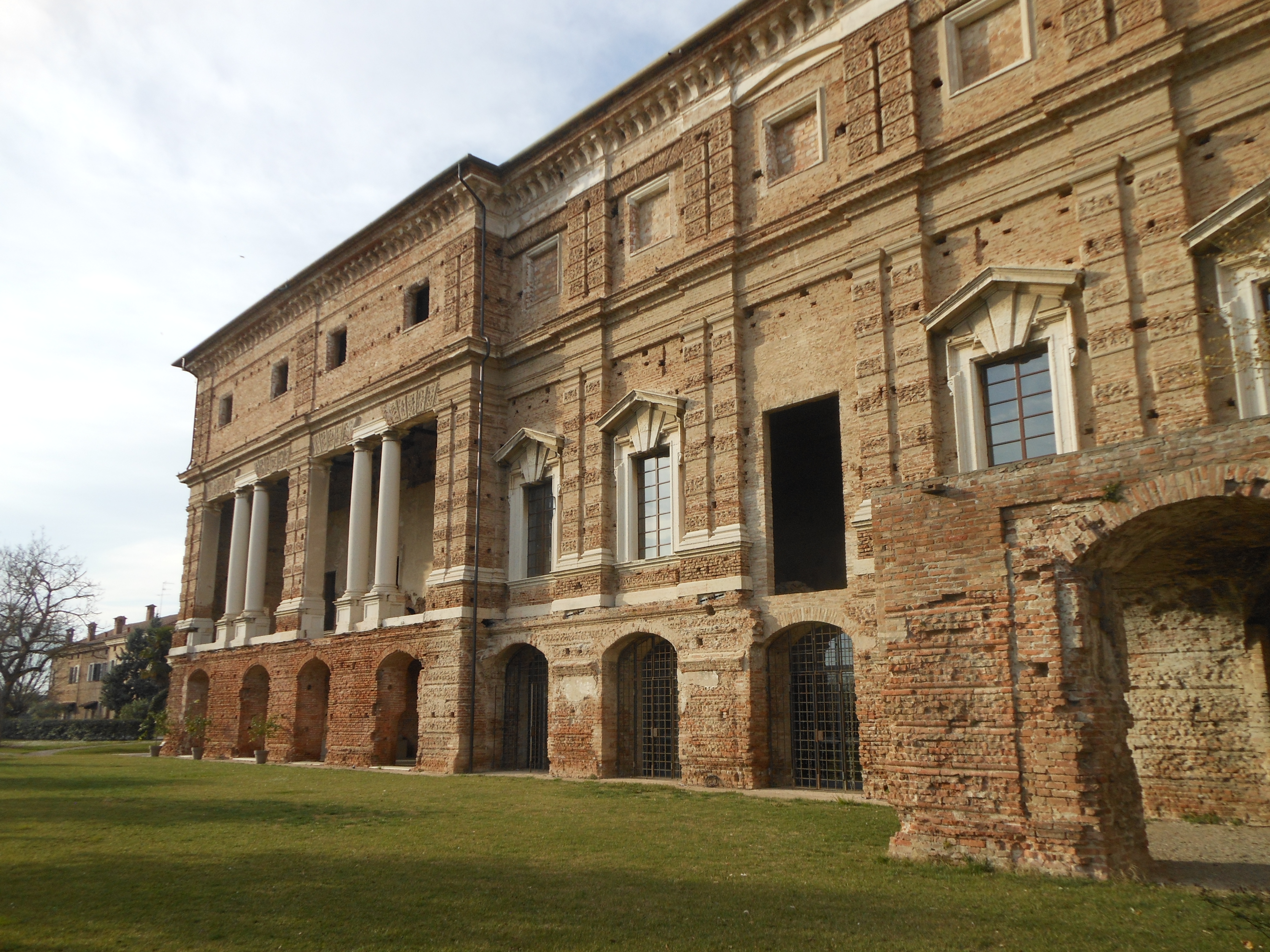
Porto Mantovano

The province has 64 municipalities:

- Acquanegra sul Chiese
- Asola
- Bagnolo San Vito
- Borgo Mantovano
- Borgo Virgilio
- Borgocarbonara
- Bozzolo
- Canneto sull'Oglio
- Casalmoro
- Casaloldo
- Casalromano
- Castel d'Ario
- Castel Goffredo
- Castelbelforte
- Castellucchio
- Castiglione delle Stiviere
- Cavriana
- Ceresara
- Commessaggio
- Curtatone
- Dosolo
- Gazoldo degli Ippoliti
- Gazzuolo
- Goito
- Gonzaga
- Guidizzolo
- Magnacavallo
- Mantua
- Marcaria
- Mariana Mantovana
- Marmirolo
- Medole
- Moglia
- Monzambano
- Motteggiana
- Ostiglia
- Pegognaga
- Piubega
- Poggio Rusco
- Pomponesco
- Ponti sul Mincio
- Porto Mantovano
- Quingentole
- Quistello
- Redondesco
- Rivarolo Mantovano
- Rodigo
- Roncoferraro
- Roverbella
- Sabbioneta
- San Benedetto Po
- San Giacomo delle Segnate
- San Giorgio Bigarello
- San Giovanni del Dosso
- San Martino dall'Argine
- Schivenoglia
- Sermide e Felonica
- Serravalle a Po
- Solferino
- Sustinente
- Suzzara
- Viadana
- Villimpenta
- Volta Mantovana

=== Municipal government ===
Here is a list of the municipal government in cities and towns with more than 15,000 inhabitants:

| Municipality | Mayor | Party | Executive | Term |
|---|---|---|---|---|
| Mantua | Mattia Palazzi | PD | PD • SI | 2020–2025 |
| Castiglione delle Stiviere | Enrico Volpi | LN | FI • LN • FdI | 2022–2027 |
| Suzzara | Alessandro Guastalli | PD | PD • AVS • M5S | 2024–2029 |
| Viadana | Nicola Cavatorta | LN | FI • LN • FdI | 2020–2025 |
| Porto Mantovano | Maria Paola Salvarani | FdI | FI • LN • FdI | 2024–2029 |

== Demographics ==
Historical population
| Year | Pop. | ±% |
|---|---|---|
| 1861 | 108,227 | — |
| 1871 | 292,737 | +170.5% |
| 1881 | 300,311 | +2.6% |
| 1901 | 315,448 | +5.0% |
| 1911 | 353,006 | +11.9% |
| 1921 | 380,802 | +7.9% |
| 1931 | 403,422 | +5.9% |
| 1936 | 407,977 | +1.1% |
| 1951 | 424,753 | +4.1% |
| 1961 | 387,255 | −8.8% |
| 1971 | 376,892 | −2.7% |
| 1981 | 377,158 | +0.1% |
| 1991 | 369,630 | −2.0% |
| 2001 | 377,790 | +2.2% |
| 2011 | 408,336 | +8.1% |
| 2021 | 404,476 | −0.9% |
Source: ISTAT

As of 2026, the population is 408,715, of which 49.8% are male, and 50.2% are female. Minors make up 14.8% of the population, and seniors make up 25.0%.

=== Immigration ===
As of 2025, immigrants make up 17.2% of the population. The 5 largest foreign countries of birth are India, Morocco, Romania, Albania, and Brazil.

== Economy ==
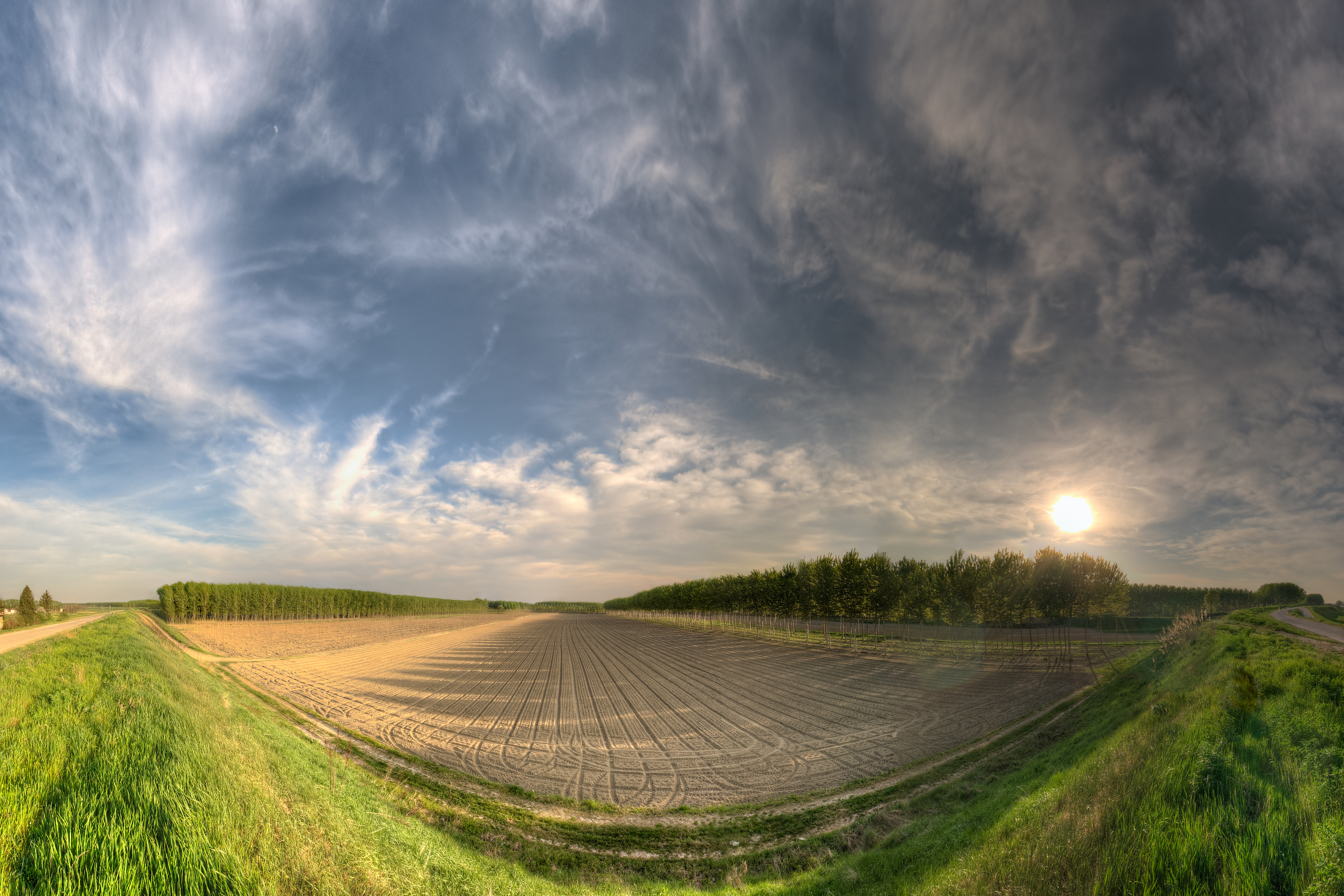
Fields near Po river in Viadana

Despite Mantuan landscape is primarily an agricultural one and the primary sector accounted for the 6% of local GDP in 2003, much above Italian average, the province has an historically strong industrial sector, which accounts for 37% of the GDP, while the tertiary sector holds the remaining 56%. Overall, the gross domestic product of the province was estimated in 2003 at over €10 billion.

The productivity of agriculture is enhanced by a well-developed use of fertilizers and the traditional abundance of water. It is largely flat and the soil is very fertile and is intensively irrigated, boosted since the Middle Ages by the construction of a wide net of irrigation canals which were partly designed by Leonardo da Vinci. Crops grown include wheat, maize, rice, sugar beet, potatoes and vegetables. Olives, grapes, chestnuts and many other sorts of fruit are grown; mulberry plants are grown for their contribution to silk production, or sericulture. The lower plains are characterized by fodder crops, which are mowed up to eight times a year. Cattle are also bred and cheese and other dairy products are manufactured. The main exports from the province include cereals, rice, cheese and silk, but most industrial goods need to be imported.

== Transport ==
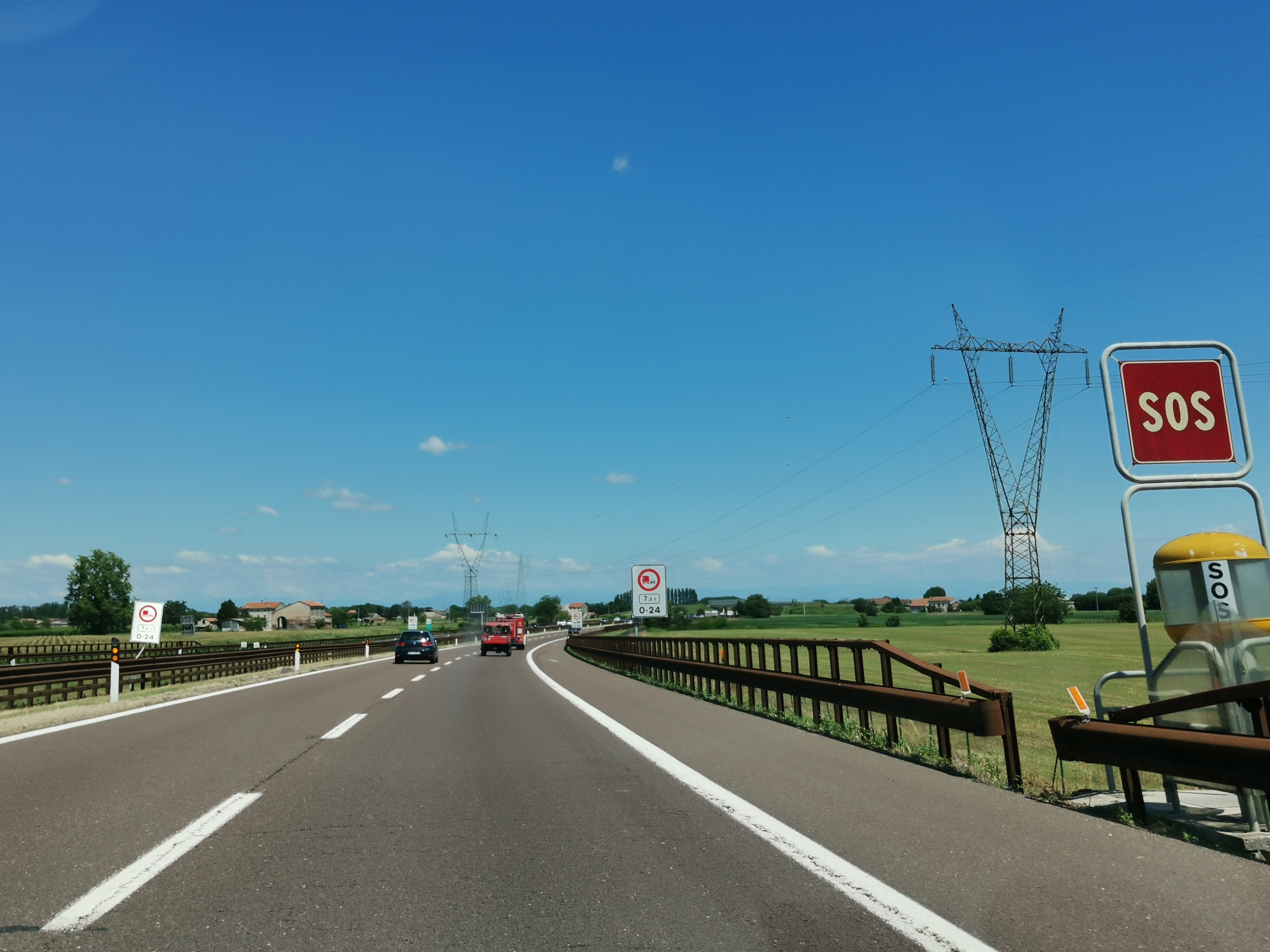
Autostrada A22 near Pegognaga

=== Motorways ===
- Autostrada A22: Modena-Brenner Pass

=== Railway lines ===
- Verona–Bologna railway
- Brescia–Parma railway

== Gallery ==
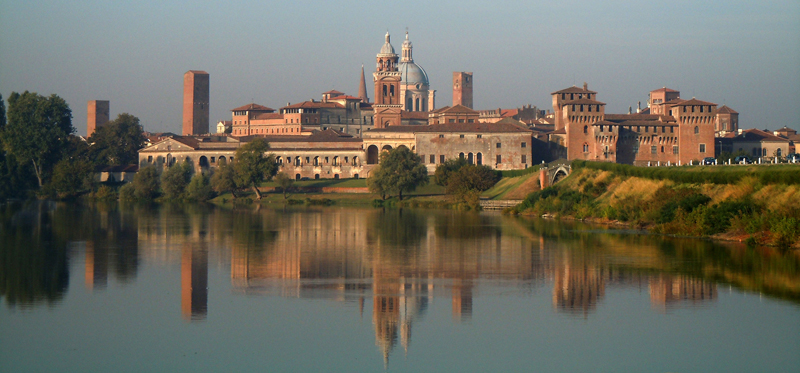
Mantua

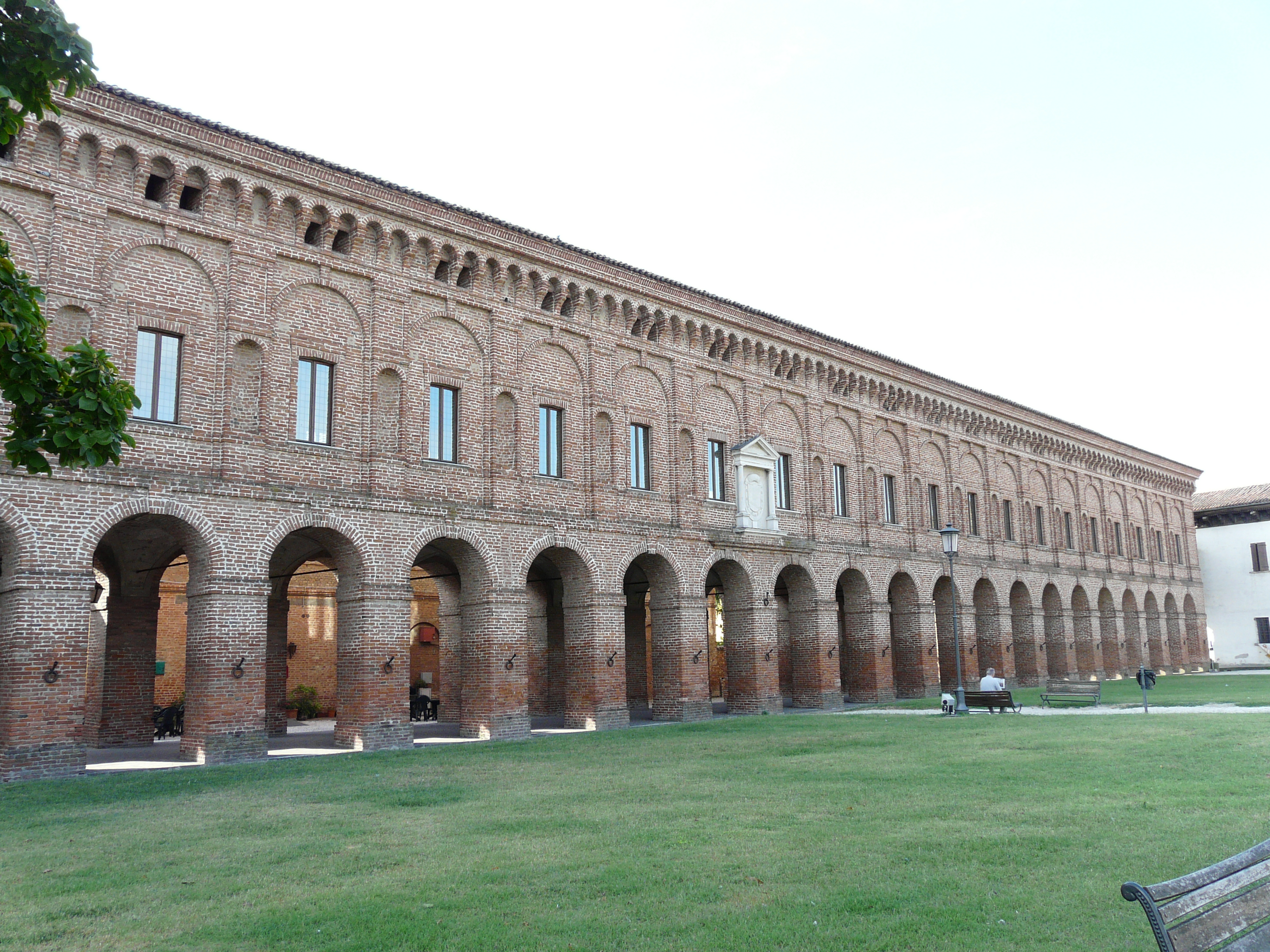
Sabbioneta

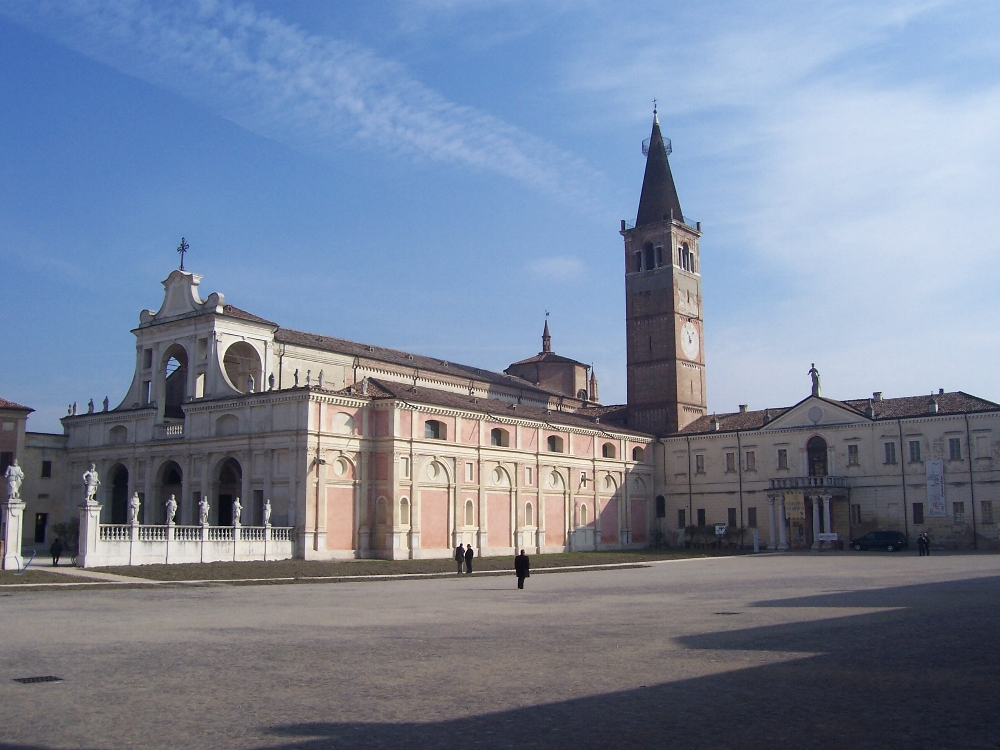
San Benedetto Po

Nearby Po river in Viadana

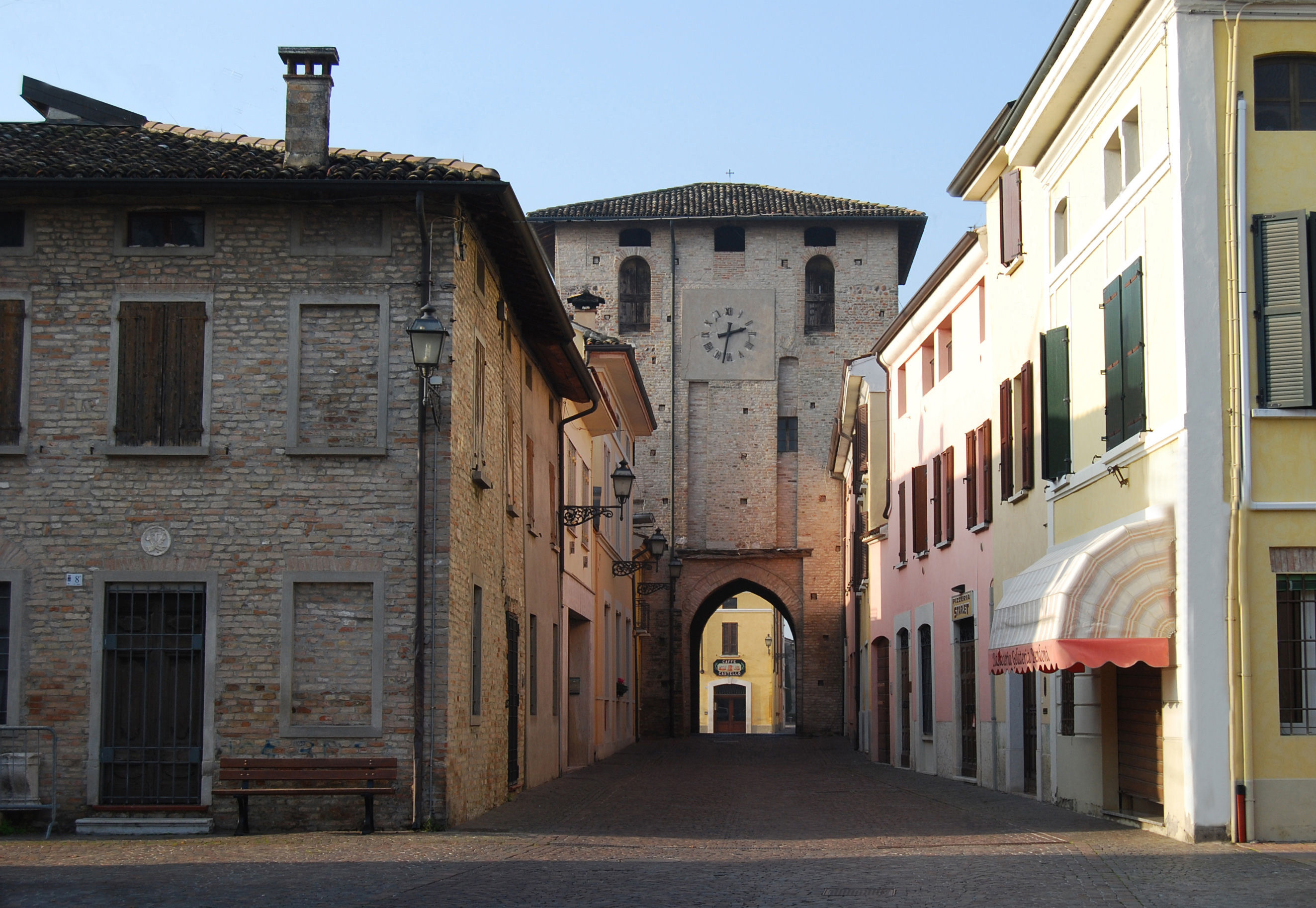
Ceresara

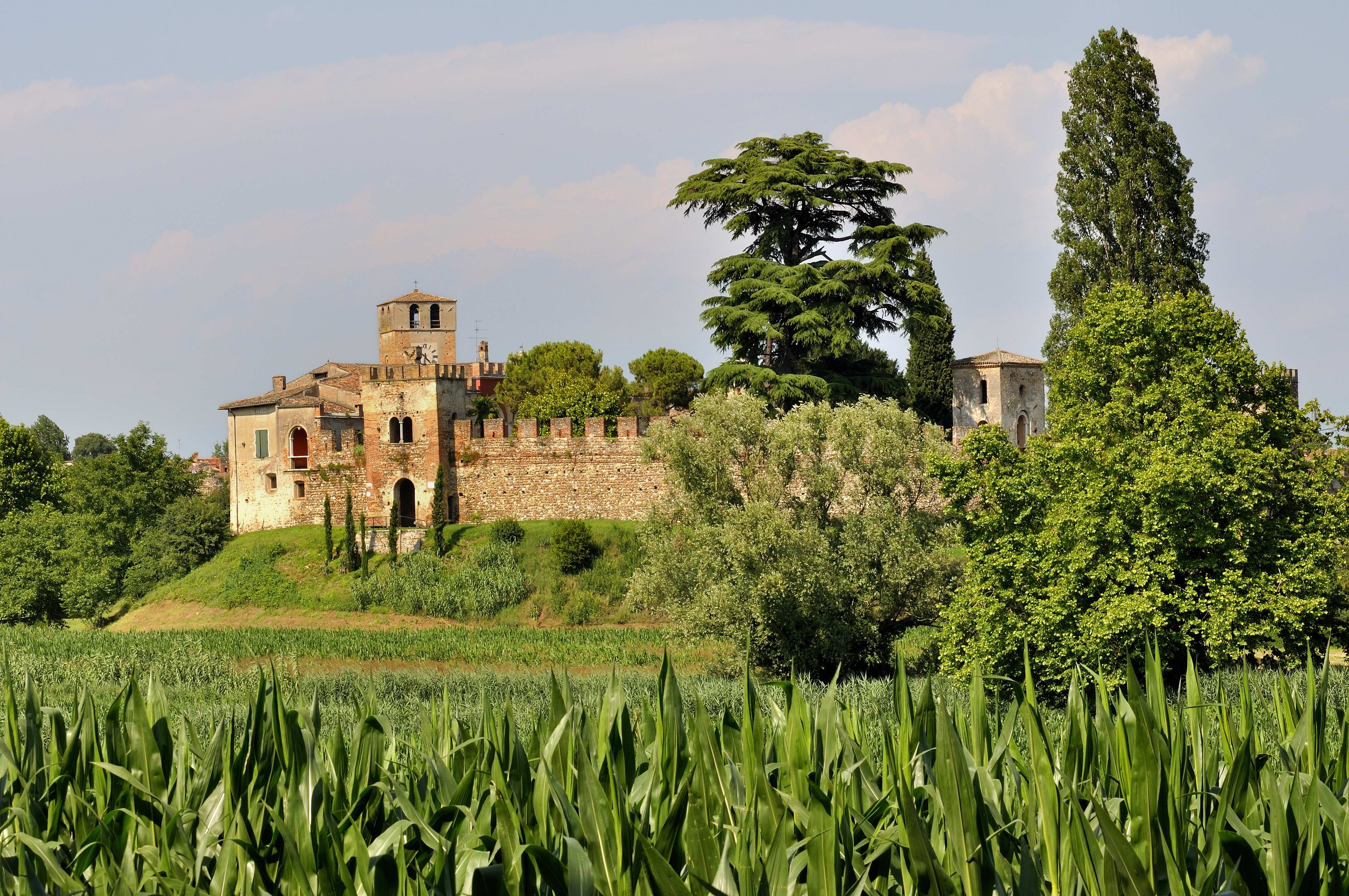
Monzambano

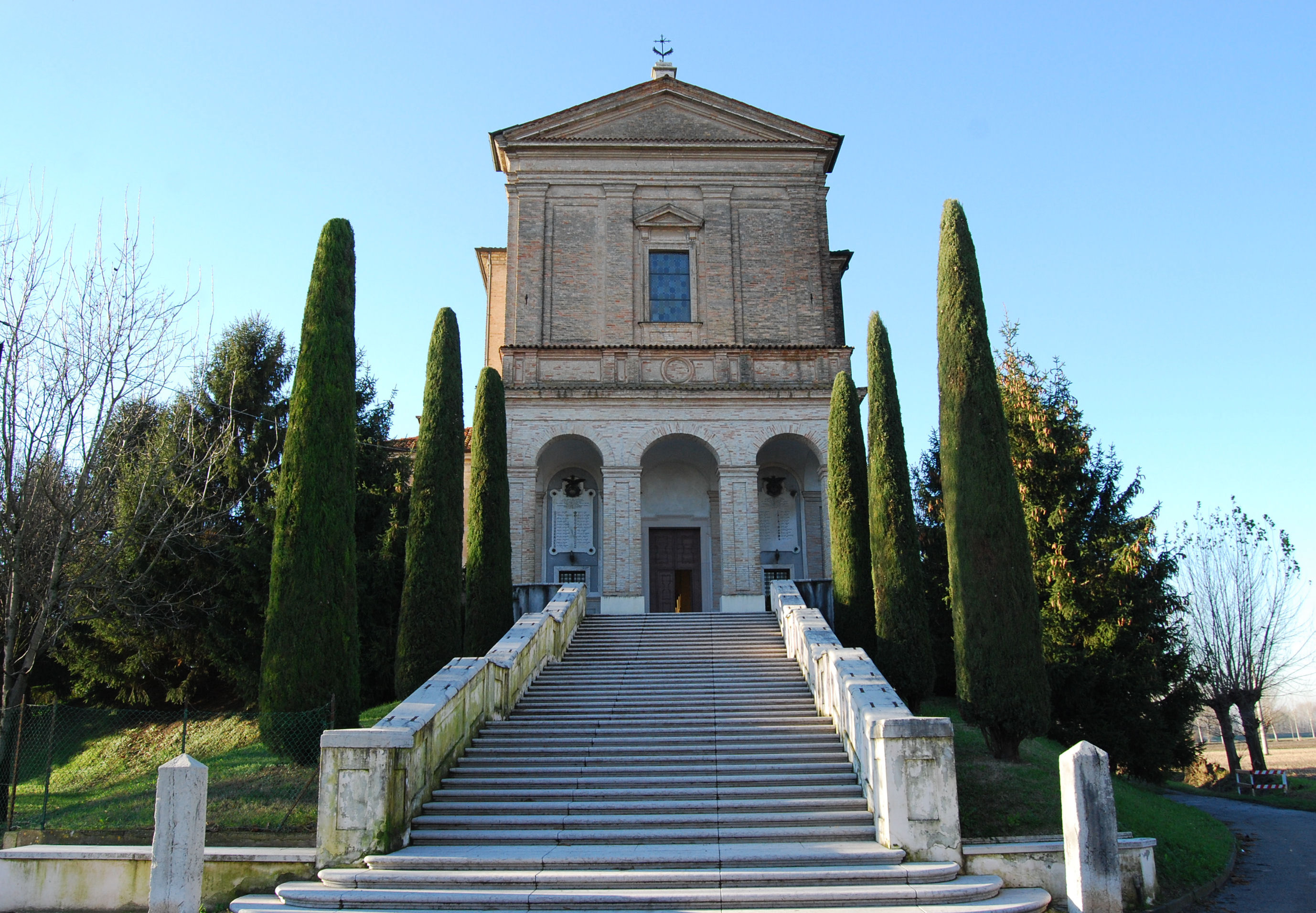
Casalmoro

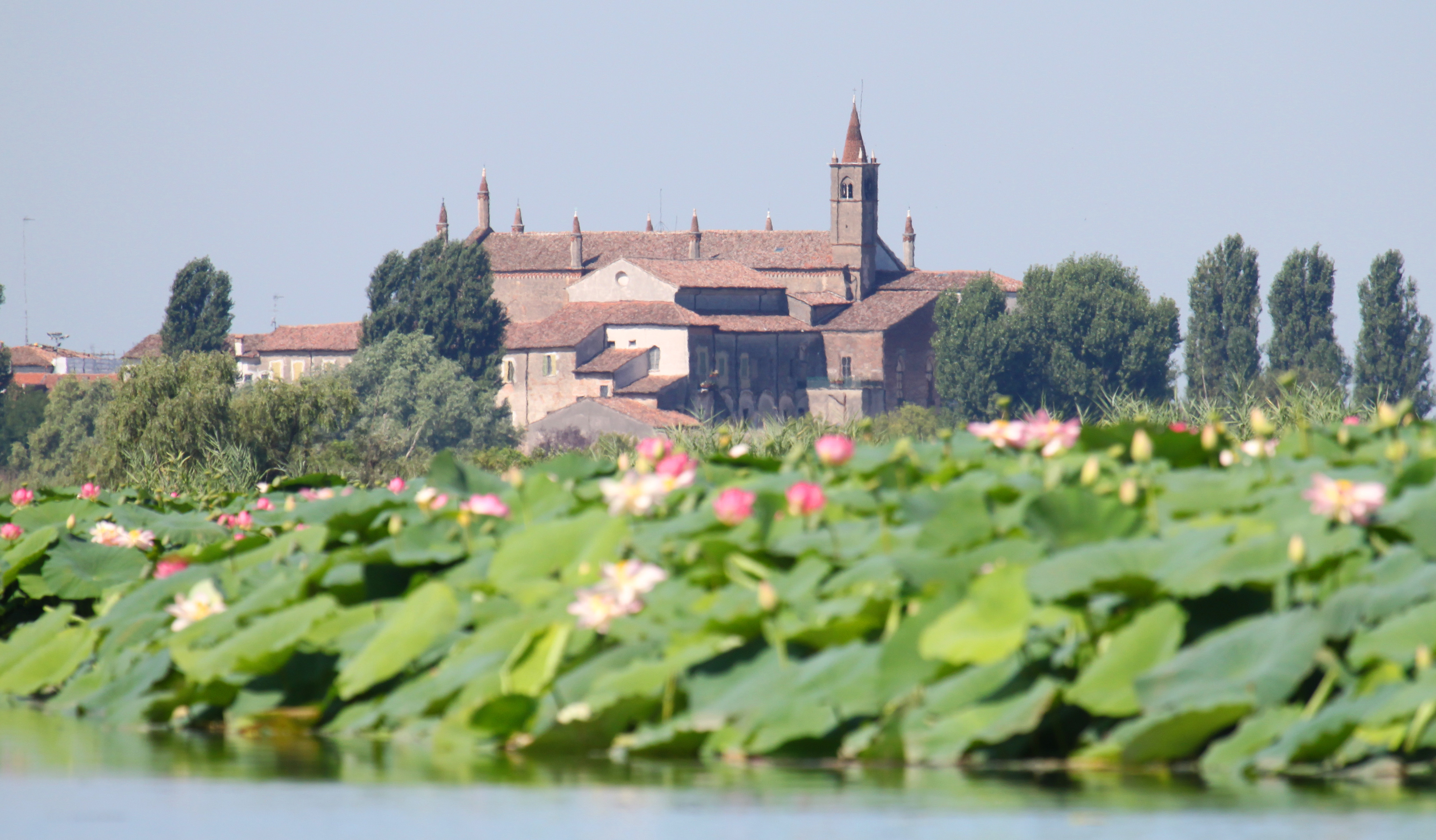
Curtatone

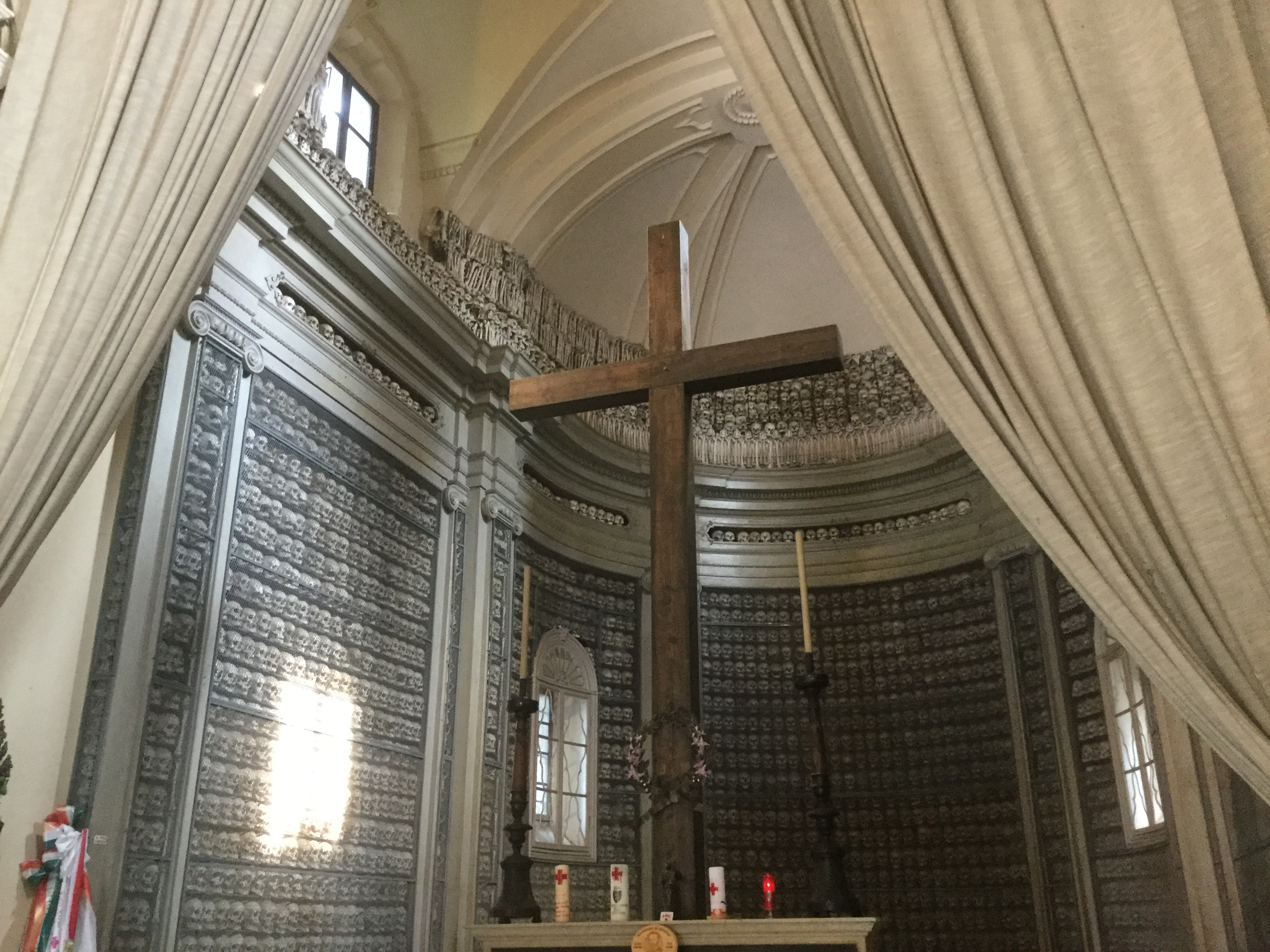
Ossuary of Solferino

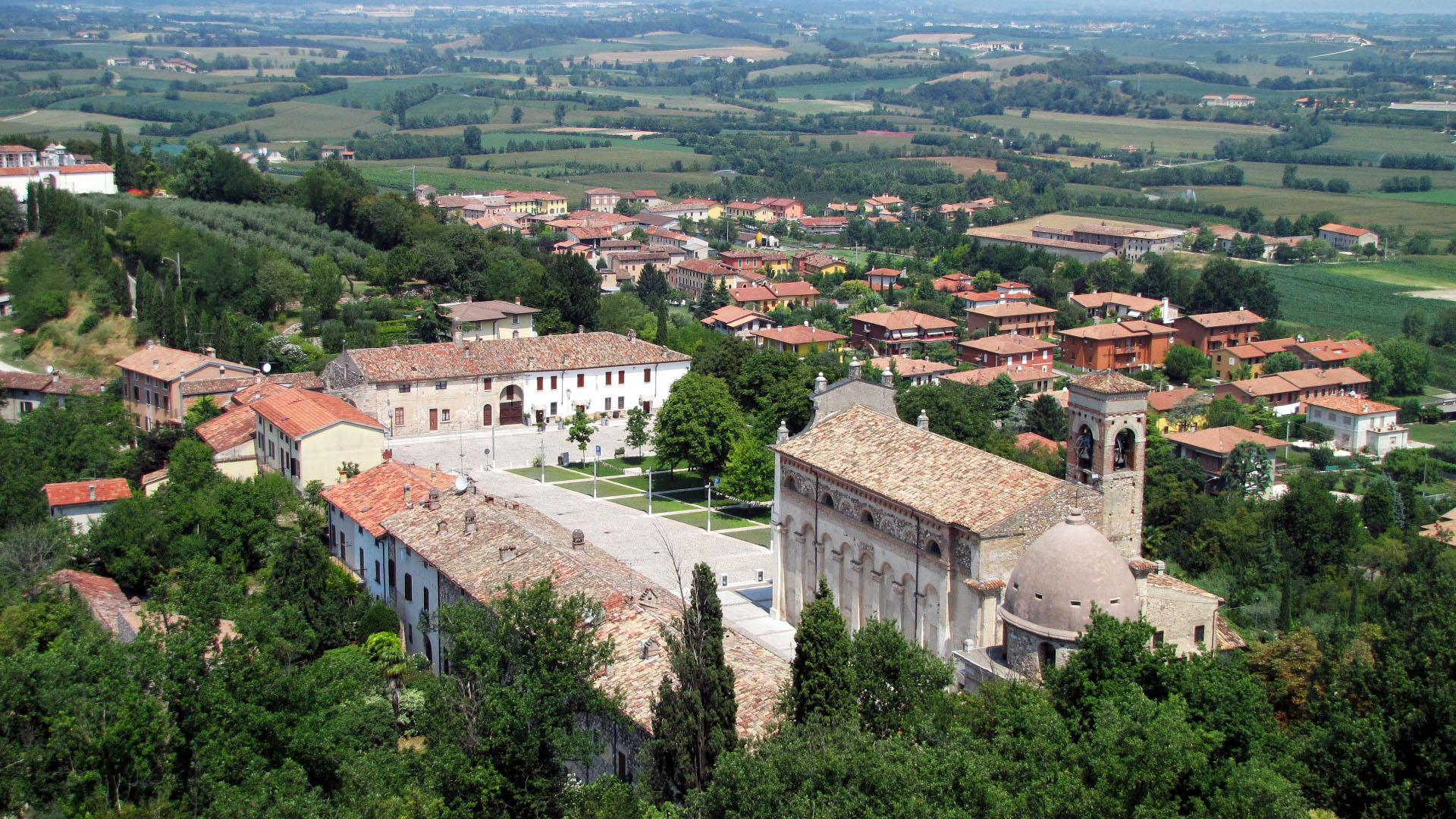
Solferino

== See also ==
- Upper Mantua
