= Quistello =

Quistello Quistèl (Emilian)
- Comune
- Comune di Quistello
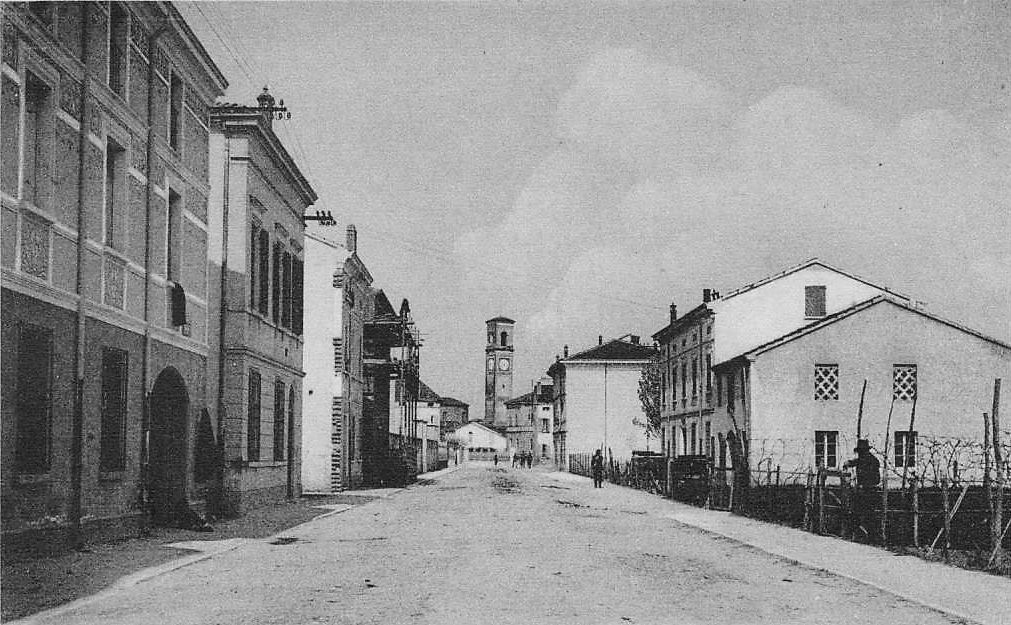

- Location within Italy Location within Lombardy
- Coordinates: 45°1′N 10°59′E
- Country: Italy
- Region: Lombardy
- Province: Mantua (MN)

Government
  - Mayor: Luca Malavasi

Area
  - Total: 45.44 km^{2} (17.54 sq mi)
- Elevation: 16 m (52 ft)

Population (30 November 2016)
  - Total: 5,637
  - Density: 124.1/km^{2} (321.3/sq mi)
- Demonym: Quistellesi
- Time zone: UTC+1 (CET)
  - Summer (DST): UTC+2 (CEST)
- Postal code: 46026
- Dialing code: 0376
- Website: Official website

Quistello (Lower Mantovano: Quistèl) is a comune (municipality) in the Province of Mantua in the Italian region Lombardy, located about 150 kilometres (93 mi) southeast of Milan and about 20 kilometres (12 mi) southeast of Mantua.

Quistello borders the following municipalities: Concordia sulla Secchia, Moglia, Quingentole, San Benedetto Po, San Giacomo delle Segnate, San Giovanni del Dosso, Schivenoglia, Sustinente.
