= Serravalle a Po =

- Comune
- Comune di Serravalle a Po
- Coat of arms

- Location within Italy Location within Lombardy
- Coordinates: 45°9′N 11°2′E
- Country: Italy
- Region: Lombardy
- Province: Mantua (MN)
- Frazioni: Castel Trivellino, Libiola, Torriana Po

Government
  - Mayor: Tiberio Capucci

Area
  - Total: 26.2 km^{2} (10.1 sq mi)
- Elevation: 15 m (49 ft)

Population (31 December 2015)
  - Total: 1,541
  - Density: 58.8/km^{2} (152/sq mi)
- Demonym: Serravallesi
- Time zone: UTC+1 (CET)
  - Summer (DST): UTC+2 (CEST)
- Postal code: 46030
- Dialing code: 0386
- Website: Official website

Serravalle a Po (Mantovano: Seravàl) is a comune (municipality) in the Province of Mantua in the Italian region Lombardy, located about 150 kilometres (93 mi) east of Milan and about 20 kilometres (12 mi) east of Mantua.

Serravalle a Po borders the following municipalities: Gazzo Veronese, Ostiglia, Borgo Mantovano, Quingentole, Sustinente.
