= Quingentole =

Quingentole Quingéntuli (Emilian)
- Comune
- Comune di Quingentole
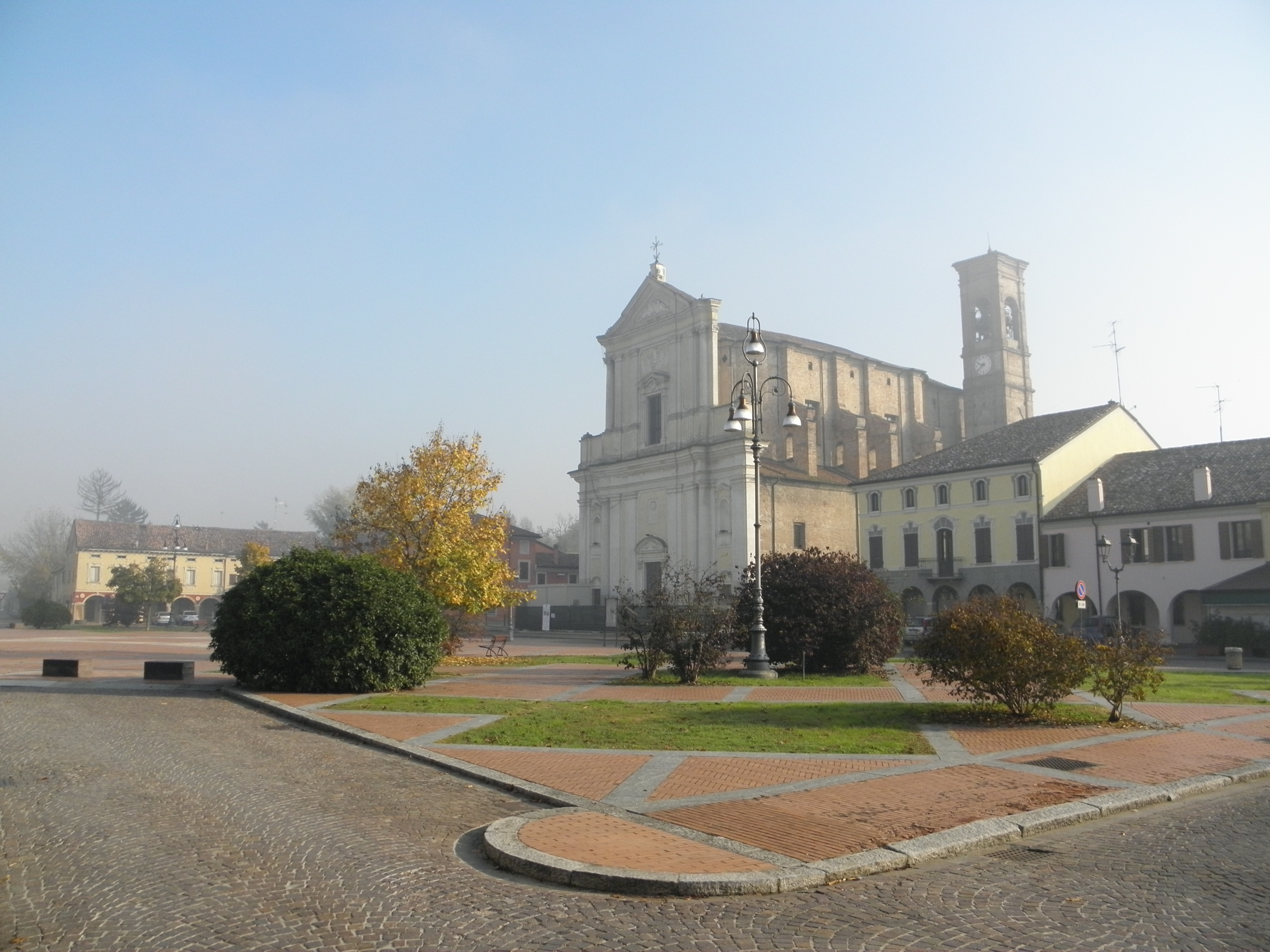

- Coat of arms

- Location within Italy Location within Lombardy
- Coordinates: 45°2′N 11°6′E
- Country: Italy
- Region: Lombardy
- Province: Mantua (MN)

Government
  - Mayor: Anna Maria Caleffi

Area
  - Total: 14.38 km^{2} (5.55 sq mi)
- Elevation: 16 m (52 ft)

Population (30 November 2016)
  - Total: 1,191
  - Density: 82.82/km^{2} (214.5/sq mi)
- Demonym: Quingentolesi
- Time zone: UTC+1 (CET)
  - Summer (DST): UTC+2 (CEST)
- Postal code: 46020
- Dialing code: 0386

Quingentole (Lower Mantovano: Quingéntuli) is a comune (municipality) in the Province of Mantua in the Italian region Lombardy, located about 160 kilometres (99 mi) southeast of Milan and about 30 kilometres (19 mi) southeast of Mantua.

Quingentole borders the following municipalities: Borgo Mantovano, Quistello, Schivenoglia, Serravalle a Po, Sustinente.
