= Bagnolo San Vito =

- Comune
- Comune di Bagnolo San Vito

- Coat of arms

- Location within Italy Location within Lombardy
- Coordinates: 45°5′N 10°53′E
- Country: Italy
- Region: Lombardy
- Province: Mantua (MN)
- Frazioni: Campione, Coreggio Micheli, San Biagio, San Giacomo Po, San Niccolò Po

Government
  - Mayor: Roberto Penna

Area
  - Total: 49.3 km^{2} (19.0 sq mi)

Population (Dec. 2004)
  - Total: 5,548
  - Density: 113/km^{2} (291/sq mi)
- Time zone: UTC+1 (CET)
  - Summer (DST): UTC+2 (CEST)
- Postal code: 46031
- Dialing code: 0376
- Website: Official website

Bagnolo San Vito (Mantovano: Bagnöl) is a comune (municipality) in the Province of Mantua in the Italian region Lombardy, located about 140 kilometres (87 mi) southeast of Milan and about 11 kilometres (7 mi) southeast of Mantua.

In its territory Etruscan remains have been excavated. The frazione of San Nicolò Po was the birthplace of road cyclist Learco Guerra.
