= Sorgà =

- Comune
- Comune di Sorgà
- Location within Italy Location within Veneto
- Coordinates: 45°13′N 10°59′E
- Country: Italy
- Region: Veneto
- Province: Verona (VR)
- Frazioni: Bonferraro, Pampuro, Pontepossero

Government
  - Mayor: Mario Sgrenzaroli

Area
  - Total: 31.54 km^{2} (12.18 sq mi)
- Elevation: 25 m (82 ft)

Population (31 December 2015)
  - Total: 3,042
  - Density: 96.45/km^{2} (249.8/sq mi)
- Demonym: Sorgaresi
- Time zone: UTC+1 (CET)
  - Summer (DST): UTC+2 (CEST)
- Postal code: 37060
- Dialing code: 045
- Saint day: 8 September
- Website: Official website

Sorgà is a comune in the province of Verona, Veneto, northern Italy.

It is the birthplace of the Italian racing car driver Antonio Ascari, father of the Italian champion Alberto Ascari.
