= Motteggiana =

Motteggiana Munticìana, Moteciàna (Emilian)
- Comune
- Comune di Motteggiana
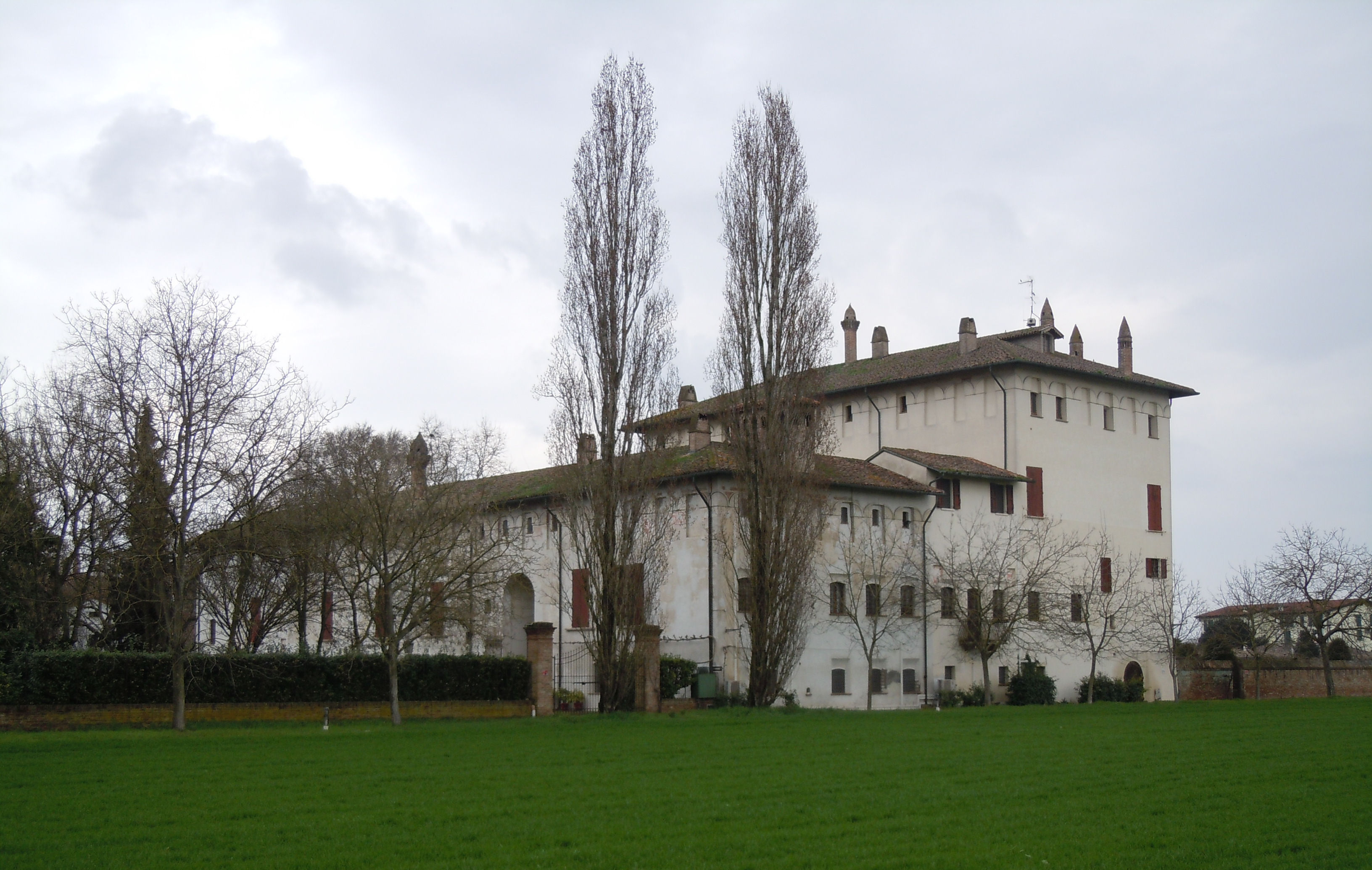

- Location within Italy Location within Lombardy
- Coordinates: 45°2′N 10°46′E
- Country: Italy
- Region: Lombardy
- Province: Province of Mantua (MN)
- Frazioni: Torricella, Villa Saviola

Area
  - Total: 24.6 km^{2} (9.5 sq mi)
- Highest elevation: 26 m (85 ft)
- Lowest elevation: 16 m (52 ft)

Population (Dec. 2014)
  - Total: 2,629
  - Density: 107/km^{2} (277/sq mi)
- Demonym: Motteggianesi
- Time zone: UTC+1 (CET)
  - Summer (DST): UTC+2 (CEST)
- Postal code: 46020
- Dialing code: 0376
- Website: Official website

Motteggiana (Lower Mantovano: Munticìana or Moteciàna) is a comune (municipality) in the Province of Mantua in the Italian region Lombardy, located about 130 kilometres (81 mi) southeast of Milan and about 15 kilometres (9 mi) south of Mantua. As of 31 December 2004, it had a population of 2,629 and an area of 24.6 square kilometres (9.5 mi^{2}).

The municipality of Motteggiana contains the frazioni (subdivisions, mainly villages and hamlets) Torricella and Villa Saviola.

Motteggiana borders the following municipalities: Borgo Virgilio, Pegognaga, San Benedetto Po, Suzzara, Viadana.

== Demographic evolution ==
Historical population

Year	Pop.	±%
1861	?	—
1871	2,994	—
1881	3,043	+1.6%
1901	3,431	+12.8%
1911	3,820	+11.3%

Year	Pop.	±%
1921	4,061	+6.3%
1931	4,032	−0.7%
1936	4,019	−0.3%
1951	3,799	−5.5%
1961	2,777	−26.9%

Year	Pop.	±%
1971	2,328	−16.2%
1981	2,013	−13.5%
1991	1,812	−10.0%
2001	1,960	+8.2%

Source: Data from ISTAT

== Twin towns ==
Motteggiana is twinned with:

- Tur'an, Israel, since 2012
