= Bondioli & Pavesi =

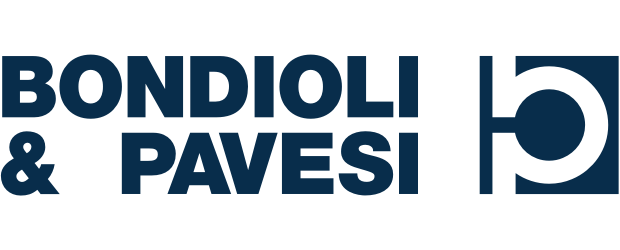
- Bondioli & Pavesi logo
- Company type: S.p.A. (public limited company)
- Founded: October 19, 1950 in Suzzara, Italy
- Founder: Edi Bondioli and Guido Pavesi
- Website: bondioli-pavesi.com

Bondioli & Pavesi is an Italian worldwide manufacturer company. It was the first Italian business to produce a driveline system for use in the agricultural sector.

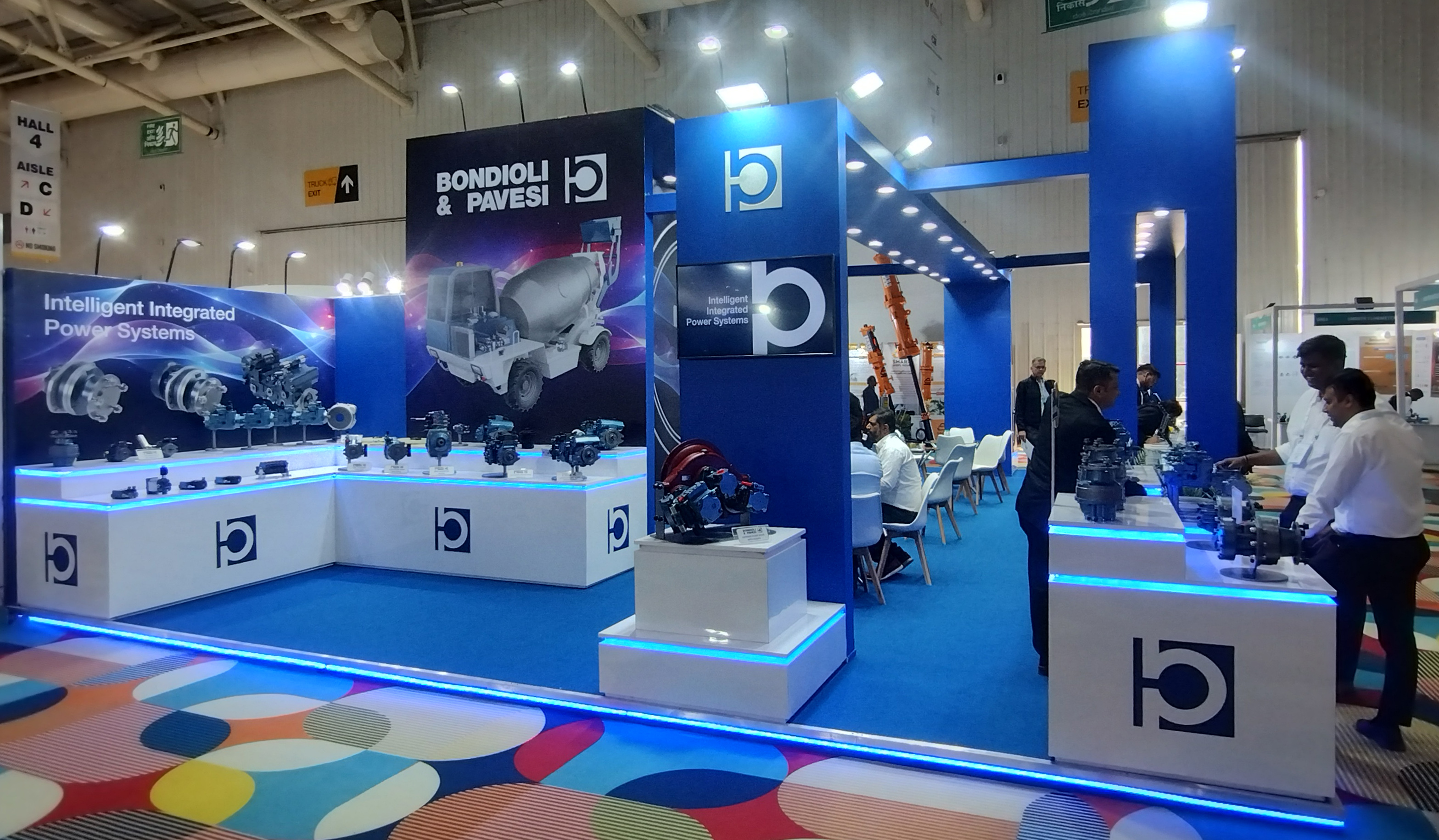
Bondioli & Pavesi at EXCON 2025, BIEC

== History ==
Bondioli & Pavesi was established in Suzzara, Italy, in 1950.
