= Ghedi =

Ghedi Ghét
- Comune
- Città di Ghedi
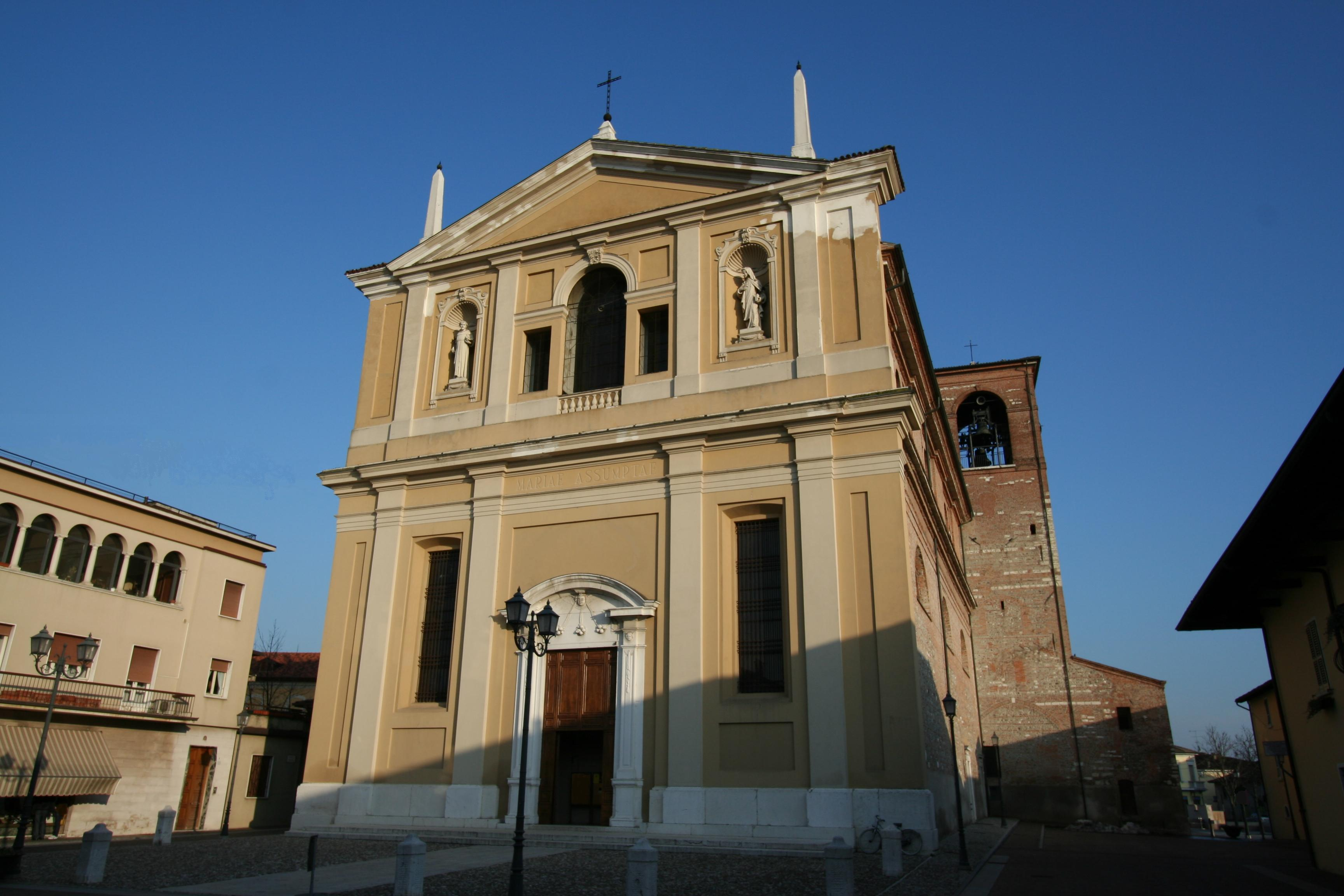
- Parish Church of Ghedi

- Coat of arms

- Location within Italy Location within Lombardy
- Coordinates: 45°24′05″N 10°16′37″E
- Country: Italy
- Region: Lombardy
- Province: Brescia (BS)
- Frazioni: Belvedere, Ponterosso, Fienil Nuovo

Government
  - Mayor: Federico Casali

Area
  - Total: 60 km^{2} (23 sq mi)
- Elevation: 85 m (279 ft)

Population (July 31, 2025)
  - Total: 18,516
  - Density: 310/km^{2} (800/sq mi)
- Demonym: Ghedesi
- Time zone: UTC+1 (CET)
  - Summer (DST): UTC+2 (CEST)
- Postal code: 25016
- Dialing code: 030
- Patron saint: St. Roch
- Saint day: August 16
- Website: Official website

Ghedi (Italian: [ˈɡɛdi]; Ghét in Brescian dialect) is an Italian comune with a population of 18,516 inhabitants, located in the Province of Brescia in Lombardy. It is located in the eastern Lower Brescian Plain and is crossed by the Naviglio di Brescia canal.

The town is renowned for being home to the 6th Wing of the Italian Air Force (whose flying groups are the 102nd "Giuseppe Cenni", the 154th and the 155th), along with Ghedi Air Base, where the Brescia Ghedi weather station is also located.

== Physical geography ==
=== Territory ===
Ghedi is situated within the Po Valley and features minimal hilly relief, being predominantly flat. It is geographically positioned in the eastern Lower Brescian Plain, thus not far from the Province of Cremona and the Province of Mantua; it covers a total area of about 60 km^{2}, with a maximum elevation of 85 m above sea level.

According to the conventional seismic classification, Ghedi falls into zone 2 (medium seismicity), particularly following the 2004 Salò earthquake. This classification was updated after the resolution of the Regional Council of Lombardy on July 11, 2014, no. 2129, which officially entered into force on April 10, 2016.

=== Climate ===
The climate of Ghedi generally aligns with that of rural centers in the upper Po Valley: falling under climate classification E with 2,570 degree days, it is characterized by a humid and temperate climate: warm and muggy in summer, but cold and harsh in winter, with widespread fog and occasional snowfall in the coldest months.

Climate data for Ghedi
Month	Jan	Feb	Mar	Apr	May	Jun	Jul	Aug	Sep	Oct	Nov	Dec	Year
Mean daily maximum °C (°F)	4 (39)	8 (46)	13 (55)	17 (63)	22 (72)	26 (79)	29 (84)	28 (82)	24 (75)	18 (64)	10 (50)	5 (41)	17 (63)
Mean daily minimum °C (°F)	−3 (27)	−1 (30)	3 (37)	7 (45)	11 (52)	15 (59)	18 (64)	17 (63)	14 (57)	9 (48)	3 (37)	−2 (28)	8 (46)
Average precipitation mm (inches)	60 (2.4)	54 (2.1)	64 (2.5)	69 (2.7)	92 (3.6)	75 (3.0)	73 (2.9)	85 (3.3)	62 (2.4)	84 (3.3)	79 (3.1)	54 (2.1)	851 (33.4)
Average rainy days	6	6	8	9	10	9	6	8	6	7	8	6	89
Average relative humidity (%)	86	81	75	76	73	71	72	72	75	79	85	86	78

== Origin of the name ==
The origin of the toponym Ghedi remains a subject of debate and uncertainty:

- Monsignor Antonio Fappani, in his Brescian Encyclopedia, suggests that it may derive from the name Gut, comparable to the Gothic heritage and similar to Godi; another hypothesis traces it to the Lombard term gaida, meaning "arrow," alluding to the piece of land in which Ghedi is enclosed, between the course of the Chiese and the lower Naviglio di Brescia.
- According to recent studies by Raffaele Castrichino, the modern toponym instead derives from the Latin term vadum, synonymous with 'ford' or 'passage':

The Latin word lama means "marsh" and is common as a toponym. A lama is low ground where water stagnates, but where one can pass on foot or horseback. The Romans crossed it; it was called the "vadum." In antiquity, fords were important locations, like bridges, ferries, or rafts. For the Romans, a ford was synonymous with 'transitus,' or passage.

— R. Castrichino, Lombard Toponymic Heritage in Montesarchio (Benevento) and Ghedi (Brescia), Appendix, pp. 28–31

Following the fall of the Western Roman Empire, and the resulting phonetic phenomena blending with other languages, the term vadum underwent Lombard influence and transformed into «gua», from the Frankish «waldt», meaning ford. In subsequent medieval eras, the term evolved into the forms Gede, Gide, Gade, Gaide, Giede, Ghede, and Gaydo.

== History ==
=== Ancient era ===
No traces or artifacts dating to the pre-Roman period have been found in the Ghedi territory: this indicates that settlements prior to Roman colonization, excluding the isolated presence of some vicus, did not affect the Ghedi countryside; nevertheless, the distinctly Gallic nature of the Ghedi settlement persisted even during the processes of so-called "Romanization" of the Brescian territory: votive tablets datable between the 1st century BC and the 3rd century AD are dedicated to deities such as Mercury and Hercules, associable with deities of Gallic culture, such as Teutates and Ogmios. The Gallic matrix also persists in the onomastics of the original inhabitants, enduring for a long time thereafter:

NTVBRIGIO . CA / NI . F . ET . BOVNITIC / VIRILLI . F . fiLI . POSIer

— Roman-era epigraph found in Ghedi and preserved at the Santa Giulia Museum in Brescia

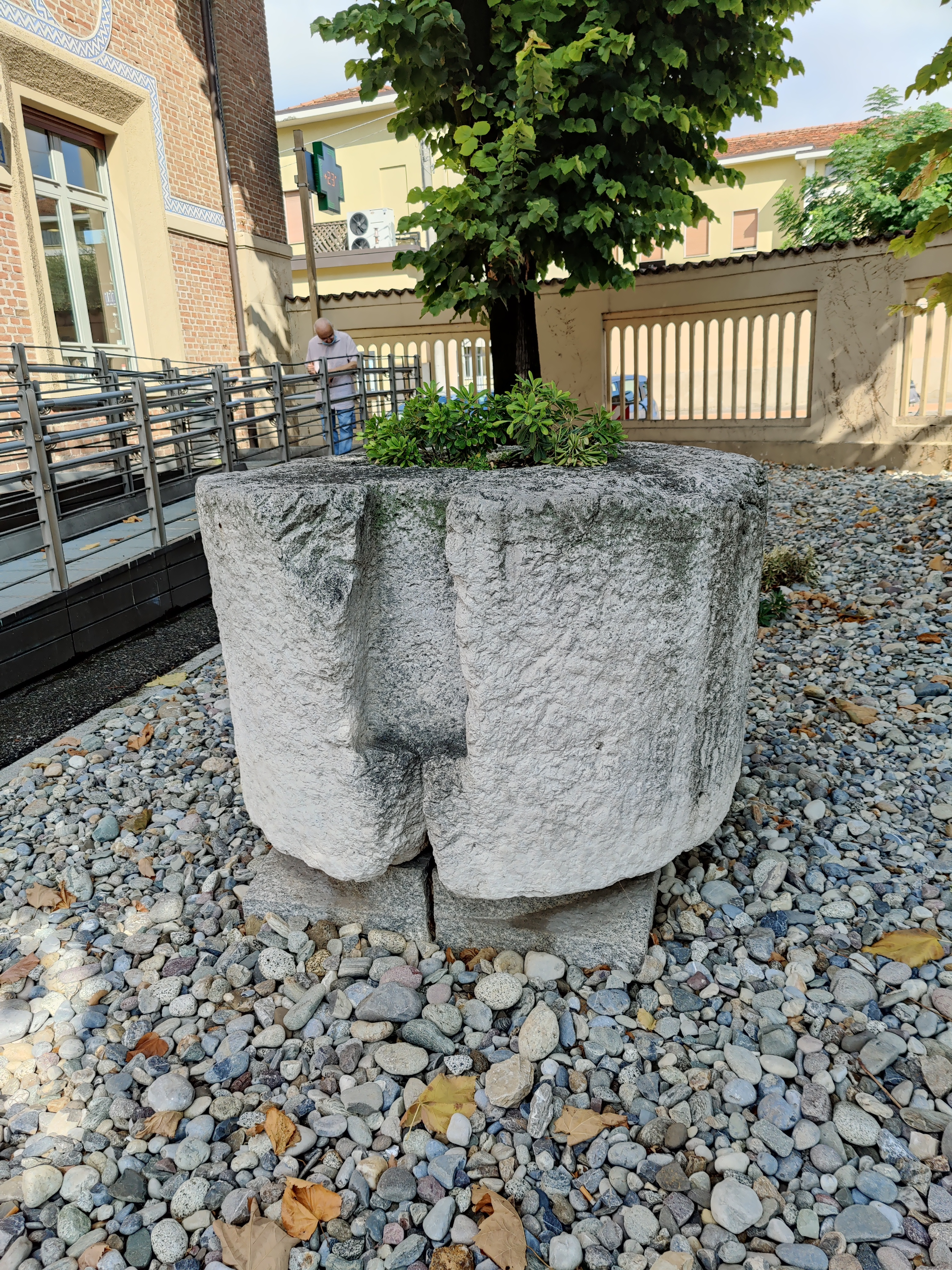
A gromatic cippus from the Roman era, found in Ghedi and preserved in the gardens of the former elementary schools

Roman archaeological sites have been uncovered near the Ghedi countryside: on the border between Leno and Ghedi, in 1895 and 1897, seven tombs were found with various grave goods, such as coins, ampoules, and finely crafted glass vases, possibly evidence of a vicus or villa with servants. In 1926, another area of interest was identified at "Cascina Santi," on the road to Viadana, perhaps corresponding to a large Roman villa: fragments of opus signinum floors and mosaics with still-legible inscriptions indicated its presence, along with heating systems, which disappeared or were destroyed. On the same road, in the locality of Alberello, stood the rural site of Formignano or Forminiano which was destroyed only later, in 1265, its toponym certainly of Roman origin. Furthermore, another epigraph dedicated to the god Hercules and found in Ghedi reads:

HERCVli / V . S . L . M / M. MAECLVs / MAGUNUS

— Roman votive epigraph by M. Maeclus Magunus to Hercules

The Ghedi territory, in the 3rd and 4th centuries AD, followed the dynamics of the rest of the empire: land plots were damaged by barbarian invasions, and climate changes between 450 and 550 AD negatively impacted the geography of the Po Valley, now completely transformed and dominated by forests and marshes.

=== Medieval era ===
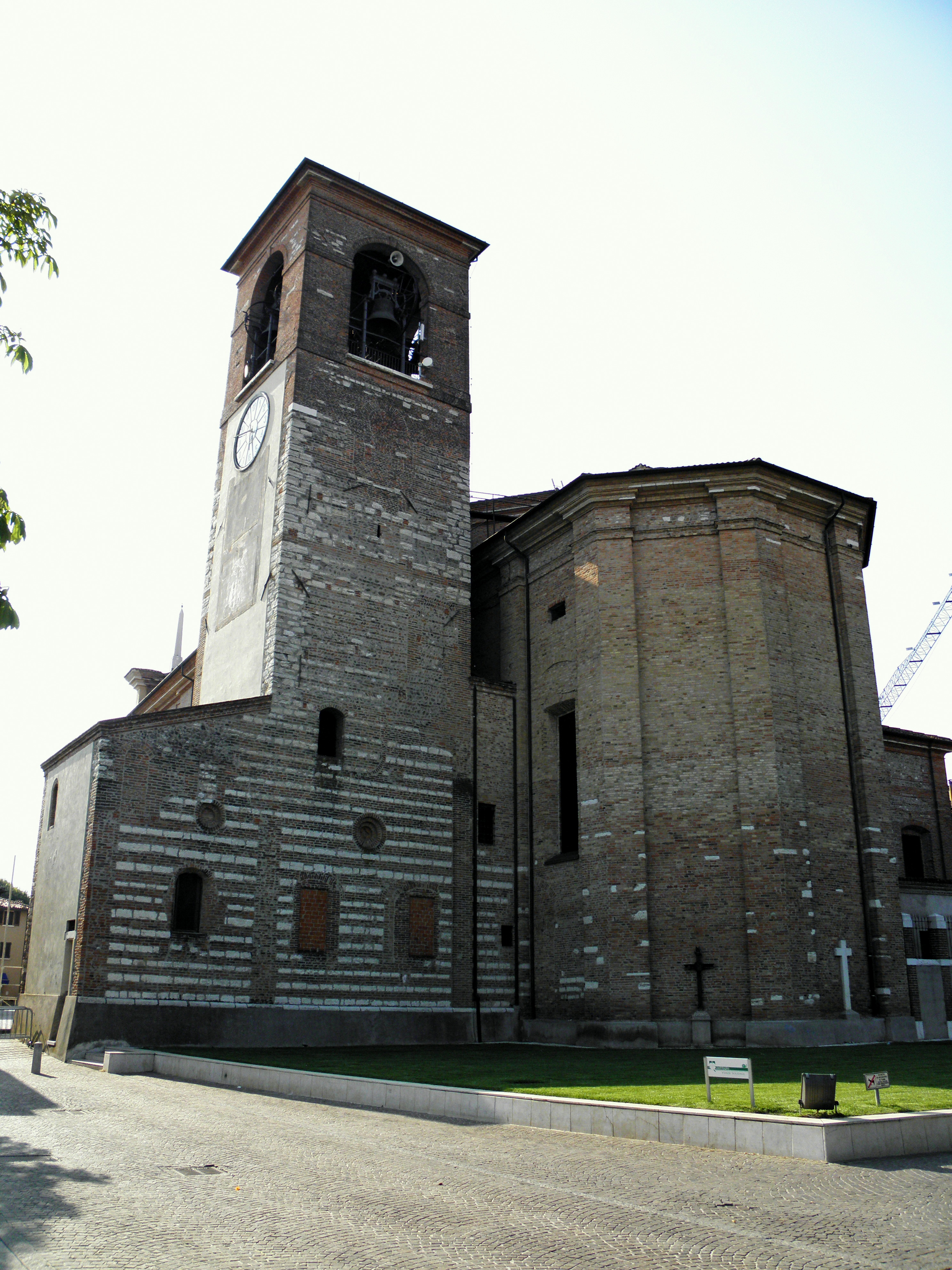
A view of the apse of the parish church and the 14th-century bell tower

The rise of the Lombards was followed by the development of a small rural center; this was also possible thanks to the territorial administration exercised by the monks of the Leno Abbey, founded by King Desiderius in 758. The archaic name of the settlement Gide (though the form Gede also appears in the document) is written for the first time in a charter dated October 12, 843, preserved at the Biblioteca Queriniana in Brescia: the document in question is a sales contract, drawn up in Gonzaga, then Gaudenciaga, among individuals whose names highlight the presence, in the village of that time, of a population of Lombard origin.

The oldest nucleus of the village developed around a modest fortified enclosure, which later formed the future Castle of Ghedi, the site called "castle": the ancient enclosure contained some modest shacks and the primitive early Christian pieve (on the same site where the latter stood is the parish church, the Church of Santa Maria Assunta) and, starting from the Early Middle Ages, the municipal palace; only from the 14th century onward, with the expansion of the settlement and the development of the castle, did residential buildings appear outside the walls. Thus, the traditional four boroughs or quarters were formed: Bassina, Gazzolo, Borgonuovo, and Malborgo. Connected by a network of intricate narrow streets, they gave the settlement the characteristic appearance of a rounded medieval village, surrounded by moats called sarche, later filled in and turned into streets. The defensive wall was destroyed multiple times due to sieges and the numerous disputes in the medieval era between neighboring communes, and thus rebuilt several times to counter increasingly powerful weaponry. The medieval walls were demolished at the end of the 19th century and in the first half of the 20th century, to optimize urban spaces and create the future Piazza Roma. The southern part of the walls, including some medieval shacks, was demolished to make way for the former elementary schools, designed by architect Luigi Arcioni.

=== Modern era ===
Between the 13th century and the 15th century, Ghedi followed the historical events of the Lower Brescian Plain, contested between the Duchy of Milan and the Republic of Venice; precisely because of such tensions, on August 15, 1453, the so-called Battle of Ghedi occurred. The small center, at that time under Venetian rule, gained increasing importance due to its strategic position and fortified village, a potential hub for distributing Venetian troops along the western borders. Due to continuous warfare that repeatedly destroyed the wall enclosures, the inhabitants obtained tax exemptions from the Serenissima on several occasions, specifically to rebuild the castle walls. The definitive military decline of the village dates to the technological development of weaponry, now capable of easily besieging the simple village wall.

In 1465, amid these ongoing conflicts and to restore faith among the people of Ghedi, the community erected a monastery named Santa Maria delle Grazie, donating it to the Observant Friars Minor. From 1498 onward, the Republic of Venice granted the territory of Ghedi as a fief to Niccolò di Pitigliano, Count of Pitigliano and Nola, and Captain General of the Mainland for the Serenissima; wishing to reside there permanently, he had a noble palace built and prepared a funerary monument in the church of the aforementioned Franciscan convent. The latter, following the Napoleonic suppression of 1799, fell into disuse. It was then sold and converted into a farmhouse (the so-called Santa Maria, which still exists); the funerary mausoleum was donated in 1838 by nobleman Ottavio Mondella to the Santa Giulia Museum in Brescia, to be placed in the choir of the nuns.

Starting from the 15th century, thanks to a stable economic situation in the commune and the practice of emphyteusis, the first farmhouses arose within the same village. Known in dialect as löch, or if smaller, löcasì, they typically featured internal vegetable gardens and orchards hidden behind large gates. The commune's ambitions diminished in the 16th century. Ghedi shifted its focus to preserving the existing heritage and abandoned expansionist policies, which led to a definitive decline.

=== Contemporary era ===
As early as 1547, attempts were made to render the village lands cultivable, especially the heath to the north and east of the center, by diverting the course of the Naviglio di Brescia into small canals; other reclamation efforts were undertaken from the late 18th century, mainly on the initiative of the Brescian agricultural academy. However, a radical intervention in this regard began in the mid-19th century and early 20th century, when many farmers founded dedicated companies and societies to reclaim the lands known as "lame."

The construction of Ghedi railway station on the Brescia–Parma railway route in 1893 was significant. During the first post-war period, the village continued its economic and demographic development, also thanks to the foundation of the military airport of Brescia-Ghedi, named after Luigi Olivari; this new military hub hosted several air shows in the 1930s, some of which were attended by Gabriele D'Annunzio. At that time, the local economy was based on sericulture and livestock breeding, so much so that in 1930 a new slaughterhouse was founded for trading animal meat. In 1915, a modern cotton mill was also established, called "Cotonificio del Mella" and later "Filatura Bresciana," which by 1930 employed about 500 people. Meanwhile, from 1928, agrarian reform was completed, and five new rural establishments were built along with two new quarries, "Gandina" and "Montirone"; the Credito Agrario Bresciano also assisted the local population in reclaiming the lame. After reaching its peak, Ghedi Airport became home to the Frecce Tricolori and the 6th Wing of the Italian Air Force in the 1960s.

=== Symbols ===
The coat of arms of Ghedi was recognized by decree of the head of government on July 12, 1929.

Red with an inverted silver capital "V."

The municipal gonfalon is a blue drapery.

=== Honors ===
Title of City - ribbon for ordinary uniform

Title of City
— November 24, 2001

On November 24, 2001, by Decree of the President of the Republic, Ghedi obtained the title of City of Italy.

== Monuments and places of interest ==
=== Parish Church of Santa Maria Assunta ===
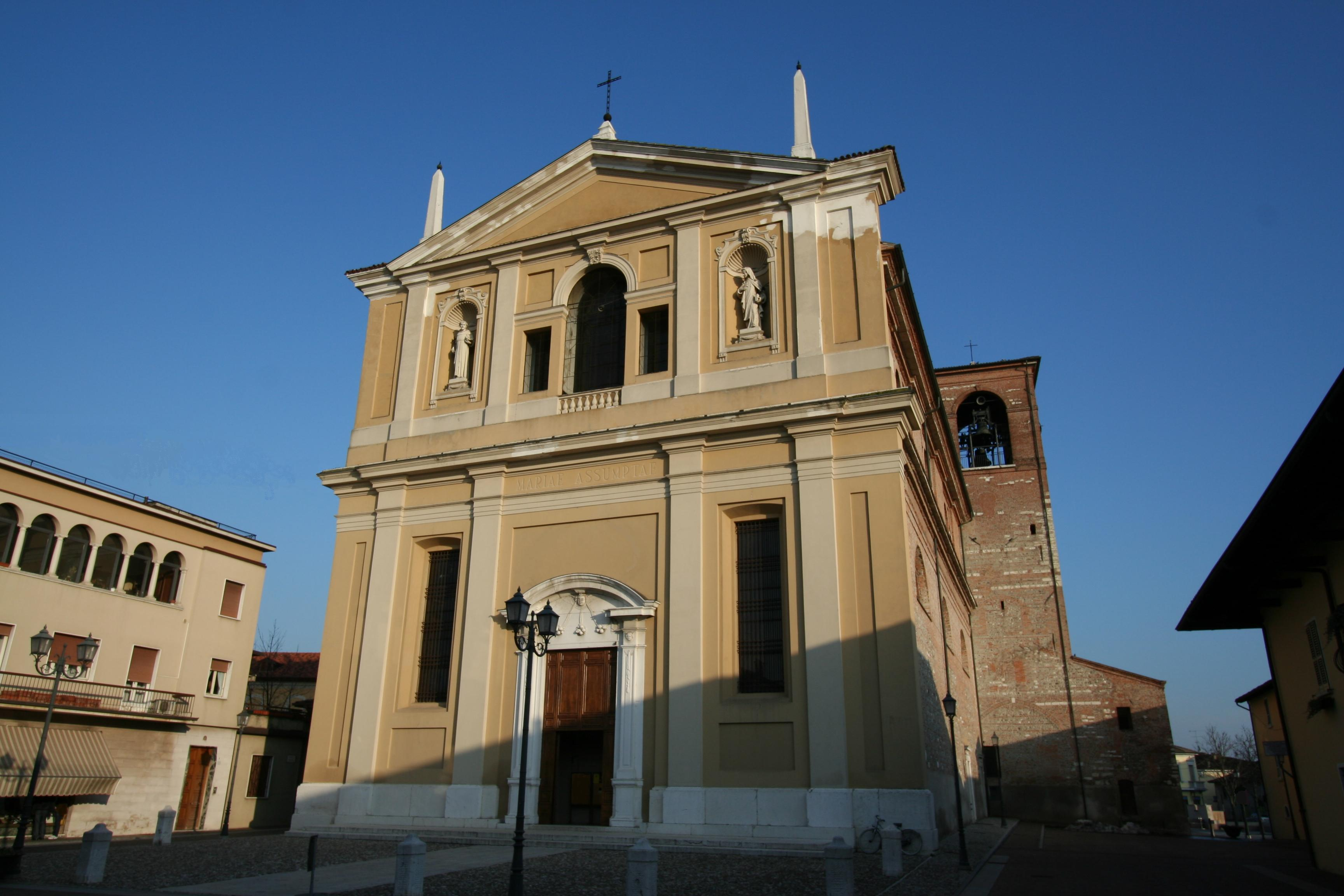
Exterior view

Evidence of a dense layering of previous buildings is evident at the site where the church stands. Archaeological findings suggest that a primitive pieve and a centrally planned baptistery arose there in the 5th century. Starting from the Early Middle Ages, the buildings were expanded and rebuilt, and the current parish church was built in the 17th century based on a design by the Avanzo family. The bell tower, which dates to the 14th century, is attached to the church and belonged to the previous Romanesque pieve.

The parish church is characterized by a single large central nave and houses several notable works, including a Deposition by Pietro Ricchi, a wooden crucifix attributed to either Stefano Lamberti or Maffeo Olivieri, an Assumption by Pietro Marone, and a series of paintings depicting the Mysteries of the Rosary, also by Ricchi.

=== Church of the Madonna of Caravaggio ===
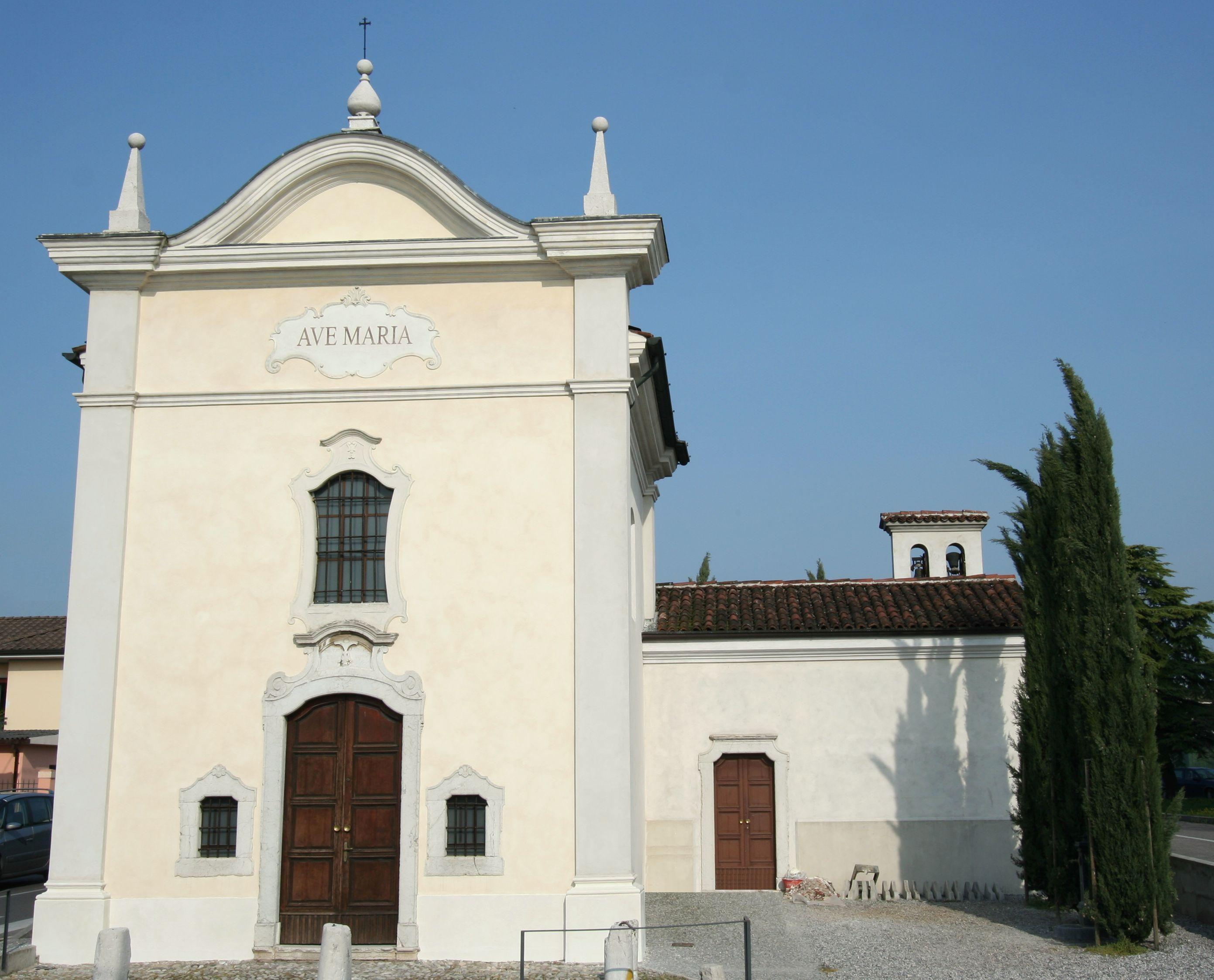
The subsidiary church of the Madonna of Caravaggio in Ghedi

Construction of the building began in 1759 and it is dedicated to the apparition of the Virgin Mary in the town of Caravaggio, later renamed Santa Maria del Fonte. Since the building was erected several centuries after this miraculous event, the true reason for its construction remains unknown. Historian Angelo Bonini hypothesizes that it may have been a place where farmers could thank the Virgin Mary. It was commonly believed that, through her intercession, the epidemics afflicting the people of Ghedi at that time had ceased. The patrons of this religious building are also unknown, though it is hypothesized that they belonged to the noble Buccelleni family.

It is one of the finest examples of late Baroque architecture in the city of Ghedi. Built where the village's most fertile fields were accessed, it symbolizes the Virgin's protection of agricultural activities.

=== Sanctuary of the Dead of the Fossetta ===
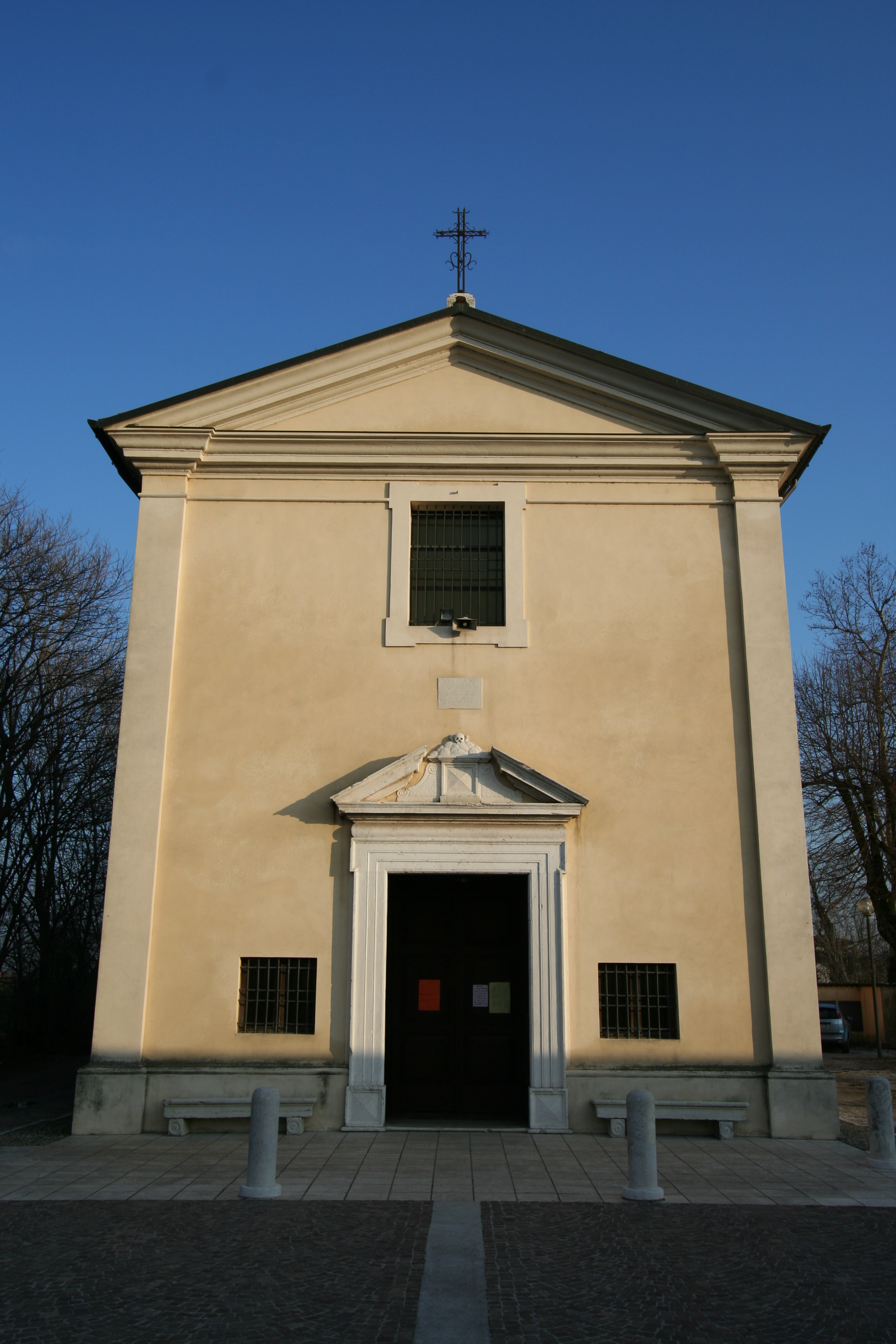
The sanctuary of San Rocco or of the Dead of the Fossetta

It is also called the Sanctuary of San Rocco. Construction began in 1630 to commemorate the victims of the plague that year. The commemorative plaque on the church façade indicates that a mass grave containing the remains of Ghedi's plague victims was originally on the site where the church later was built.

Over time, this site has garnered immense devotion from its inhabitants, who have traditionally sought intercessions and miracles from the bones of the plague victims. This has fueled popular beliefs about the thaumaturgic properties of these remains. Because of these associations, the church sacristy contains many ex-votos celebrating miracles performed by benevolent spirits.

=== Former Convent of Santa Maria delle Grazie ===
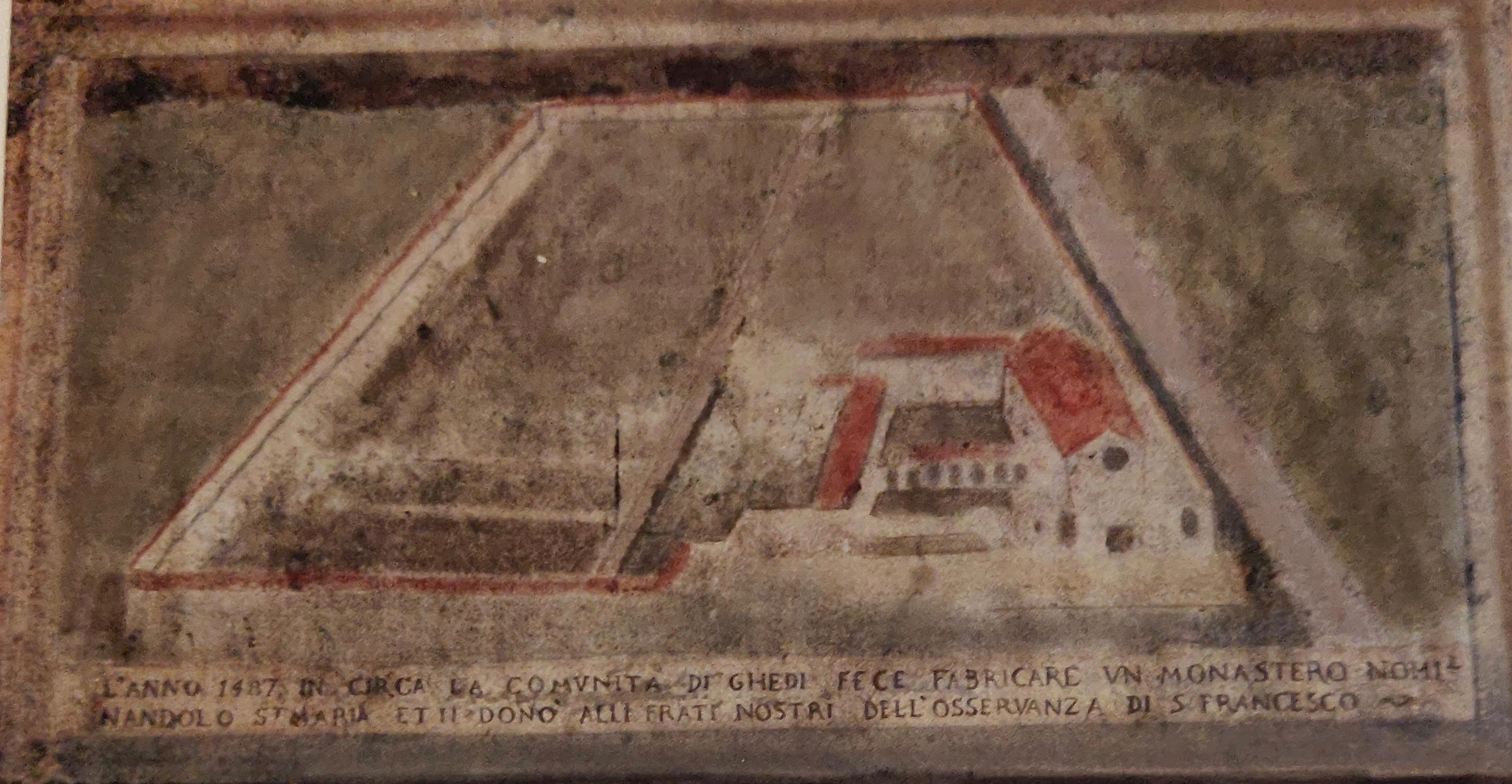
Fresco in the cloister of the Church of San Giuseppe in Brescia, depicting the Franciscan monastery

Santa Maria, a private farmhouse since the 20th century, was previously a Franciscan convent, built starting from 1465, and donated by the population to the Observant Friars Minor; from the mid-18th century it was also home to the Confraternity of the Pardon of Assisi, an important institution for the sale of indulgences in the Brescian area.

Following the arrival of Napoleon in Italy in 1798, many convents and monasteries were suppressed with the creation of the Cisalpine Republic: the Ghedi convent met the same fate, later repurposed as a farmhouse and eventually a cascina. The buildings in the complex were destroyed in a fire in the early 20th century, while the church, after having its side naves demolished, was converted into a farmhouse.

=== Church of Santa Caterina ===
Construction began in 1630, and the building was named for its proximity to a women's monastery dedicated to Saint Catherine. Since the 20th century, it has been part of the construction complex of the male oratory dedicated to John Bosco. Shortly after its foundation, the community of lay religious women was suppressed by ecclesiastical authorities following the visit of Charles Borromeo and transferred to Brescia.

=== Municipal Palace ===
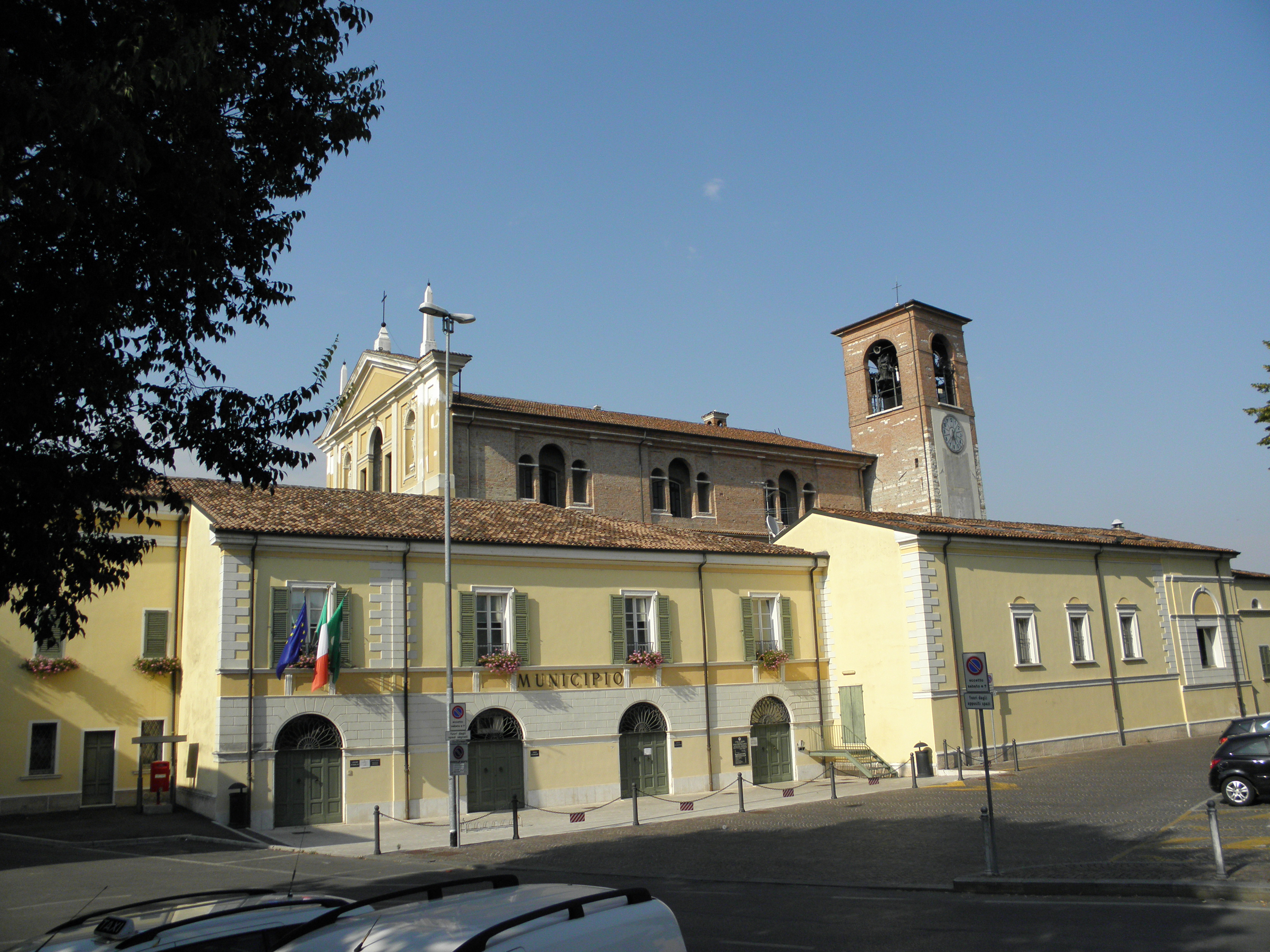
The Ghedi Town Hall building, with the 17th-century parish church behind it

Of medieval origin, it displays architectural features from the 14th and 15th centuries, following the design of traditional Lombard broletti. Until the late 19th century, it was part of the ancient walls of Ghedi Castle. It stood at the southern entrance of the castle, near one of the two drawbridges. Subsequently, the walls were demolished and the moats were filled in.

Early medieval burials were discovered beneath the town hall in 1984, indicating the presence of an ancient necropolis near the municipality and the old parish church in that era. The restoration work carried out in the 1980s revealed a portico with brick columns on the southern facade of the building.

=== Loggia delle grida ===
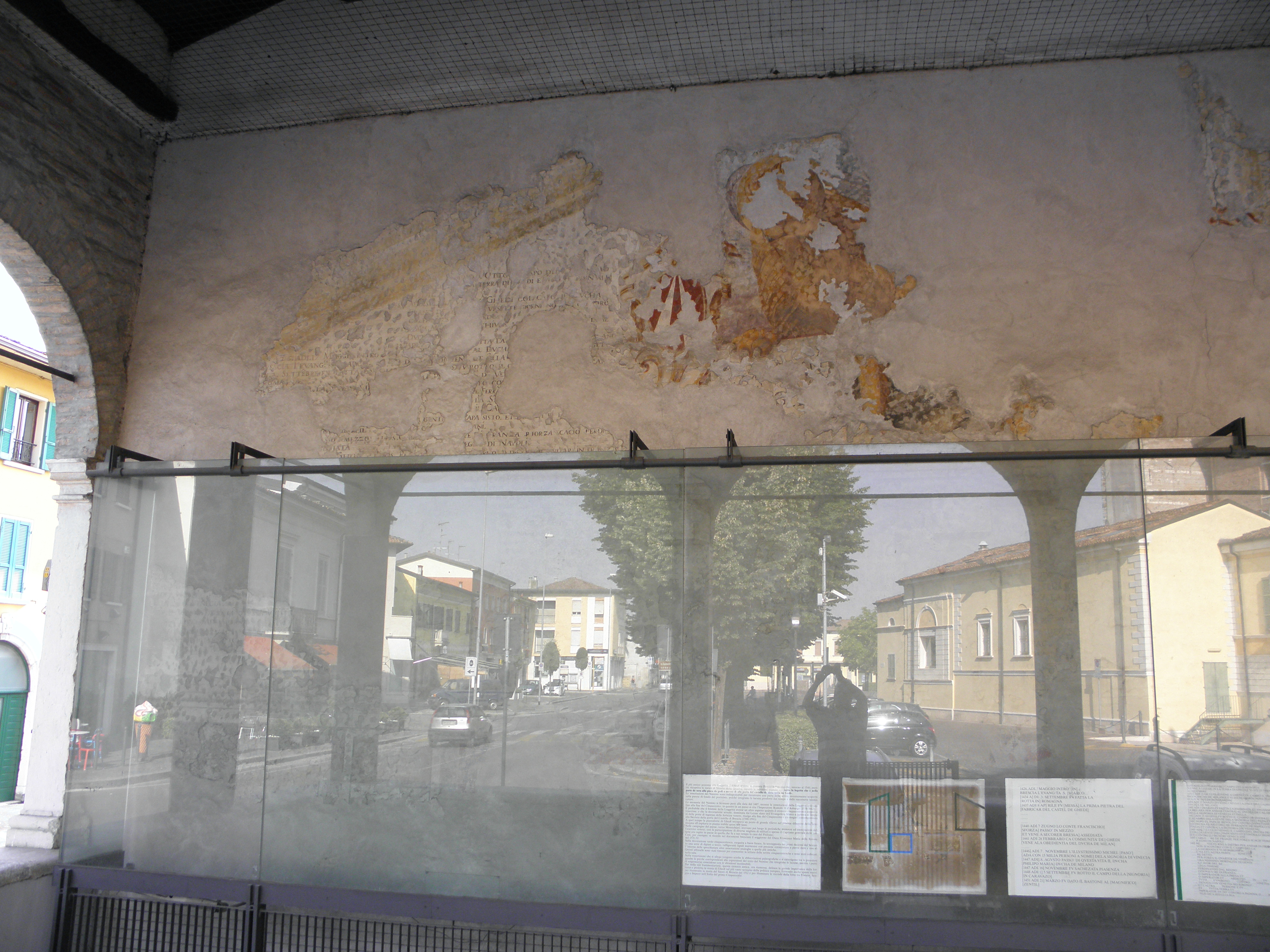
Frescoes recovered after the restoration of the so-called Loggia delle grida

Built between the 15th and 16th centuries, the building features wall frescoes that were uncovered during a restoration project. They depict historical events in the village and its coat of arms.

The events recorded in the Loggetta are attributed to the chronicler Pandolfo Nassino, who documented the military activities of the commune and of Ghedi Castle.

=== Palazzo Orsini ===
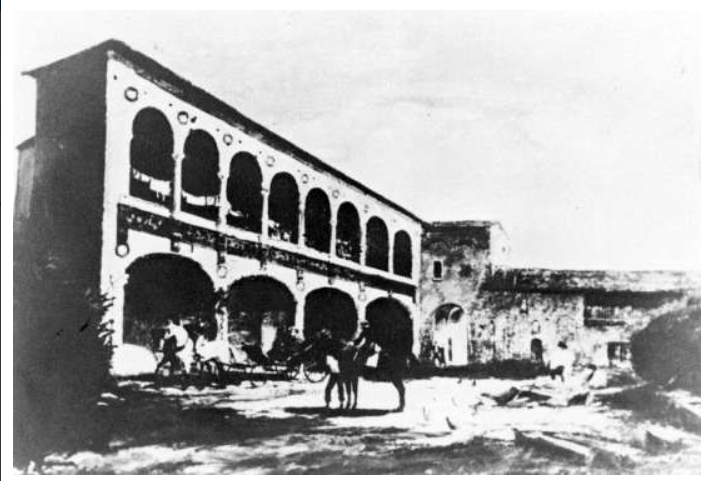
One of the last reproductions of the Renaissance palace

The noble residence of Count Niccolò di Pitigliano was built in the early 16th century after his appointment as Captain General of the Republic of Venice's mainland troops. The palace featured frescoes by Romanino and Marcello Fogolino, which were dismantled and sold to Italian and European museums before the palace collapsed permanently.

After Orsini's death in 1510, the villa was passed on to other noble families. In the 19th century, fires and collapses due to precarious conditions destroyed half of the villa. However, starting in 2014, one wing of the palace was restored and converted into a nursery.

=== Villa Mondella ===
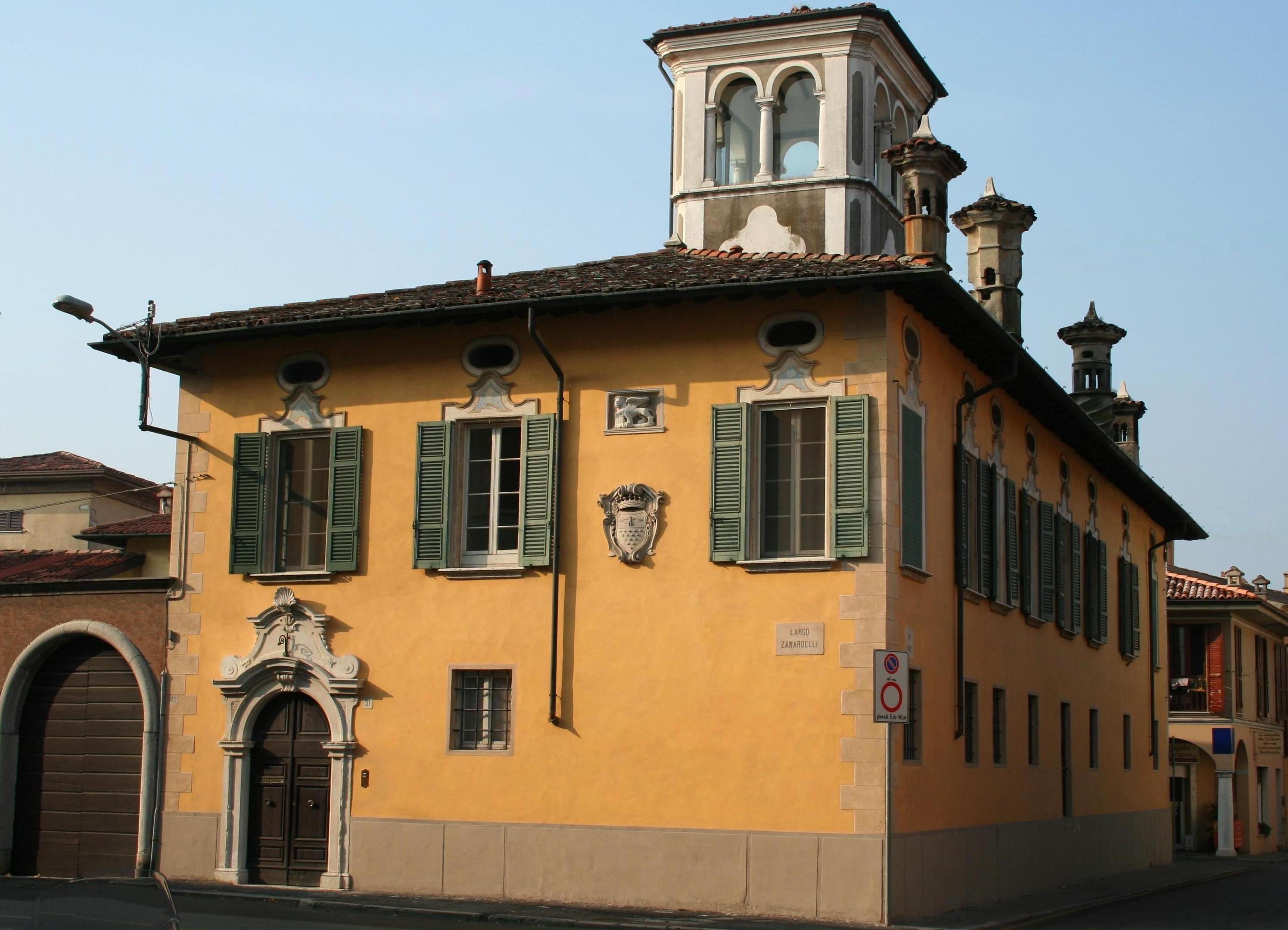
Palazzo Mondella

This noble villa was built starting in the 18th century on the site of a 15th-century building. Located in the historic center of the village, the villa has belonged to the noble Mondella family since its construction. The façade features the Mondella family coat of arms and the Lion of Saint Mark, which is likely a reused element from Niccolò Orsini's palace.

The exterior was restored in the 1990s, but the interior was only restored in 2009.

=== Other monuments and places of interest ===
- Palazzo Ochi, an 18th-century residence;
- Former elementary schools: built in 1930 to a design by Brescian Oreste Buffoli;
- Palazzo Arcioni, home to the municipal library since May 2019.

== Society ==
=== Demographic evolution ===
Resident population
Year	Pop.	±%
1861	3,206	—
1871	3,403	+6.1%
1881	3,465	+1.8%
1901	4,237	+22.3%
1911	5,471	+29.1%
1921	7,224	+32.0%
1931	8,433	+16.7%
1936	8,834	+4.8%
1951	10,638	+20.4%
1961	11,240	+5.7%
1971	11,622	+3.4%
1981	12,750	+9.7%
1991	14,194	+11.3%
2001	15,627	+10.1%
2011	18,321	+17.2%
2021	18,518	+1.1%

=== Ethnic groups and foreign minorities ===
Ghedi, like all municipalities in the province of Brescia, has an extremely varied and multicultural population, with a significant presence of foreign citizens (12.3% of the resident population as of January 1, 2021).

According to ISTAT data as of January 1, 2020, the most represented foreign population, based on its percentage of the total resident population, was:

- Morocco (348) 15.07%
- India (379) 16.41%
- Romania (374) 16.20%
- Albania (296) 12.82%
- Pakistan (179) 7.75%
- Ghana (123) 5.33%

=== Languages and dialects ===
In the territory of Ghedi, the official language is Italian, the only one officially recognized. The local language is Lombard, specifically the Brescian dialect. However, the latter shows evident influences that, to a minor extent, bring it closer to both the Cremonese and Upper Mantuan dialects. Due to the geographical and territorial proximity of the Brescian, Mantuan, and Cremonese territories, Ghedi has unique slang expressions, inflections, and phonetic characteristics that differ from those of all other provincial territories.

=== Traditions and folklore ===
- In Ghedi, as in many other provincial territories and more generally in northeastern Italy, the tradition of the New Year's bonfire is deeply rooted in the particular form of the bonfire of the old woman (vècia in dialect): a dummy of an old woman is burned near the end of Carnival, ultimately marking a clear break between the cold winter season and the impending fertility and abundance of spring.
- Feast of Saint Roch (August 16): on the occasion of the patronal feast dedicated to the saint, protector of plague victims, stalls, cultural events, and liturgical celebrations are organized. It also provides an opportunity for the community to gather and socialize.
- Saint Lucy (December 13): according to tradition, the saint would bring gifts and presents to children on the night of December 12, on the back of her donkey, which the children had requested in a written letter collected by the saint herself. According to legend, it is customary to leave milk and biscuits for the saint and hay for her donkey before going to sleep.
- Thursday market: established in 1926, it is traditionally held every Thursday in the central Piazza Roma and Largo Zanardelli. It was also proclaimed a historically valuable market according to Decree No. 8/8886, issued on January 20, 2009, by the Regional Council of Lombardy.

== Culture ==
=== Education ===
==== Schools ====
There are state and private nurseries and preschools, as well as an elementary school divided into several complexes. Additionally, there is a public middle school and a public high school that offer various courses, including science, social studies, and health services.

== Infrastructure and transport ==
=== Roads ===
The settlement of Ghedi is skirted to the south by the former State Road 668 Lenese, connecting Orzinuovi to Lonato del Garda. The center is also crossed by provincial road 24 Brescia-Fiesse. The Ghedi Western Ring Road, a western bypass, was inaugurated in November 2009. Its purpose was to divert traffic from the SP24 road away from the town.

The following provincial roads also depart from Ghedi:

- 65, which goes to Bagnolo Mella;
- 66, which goes to Castenedolo.

=== Railways ===
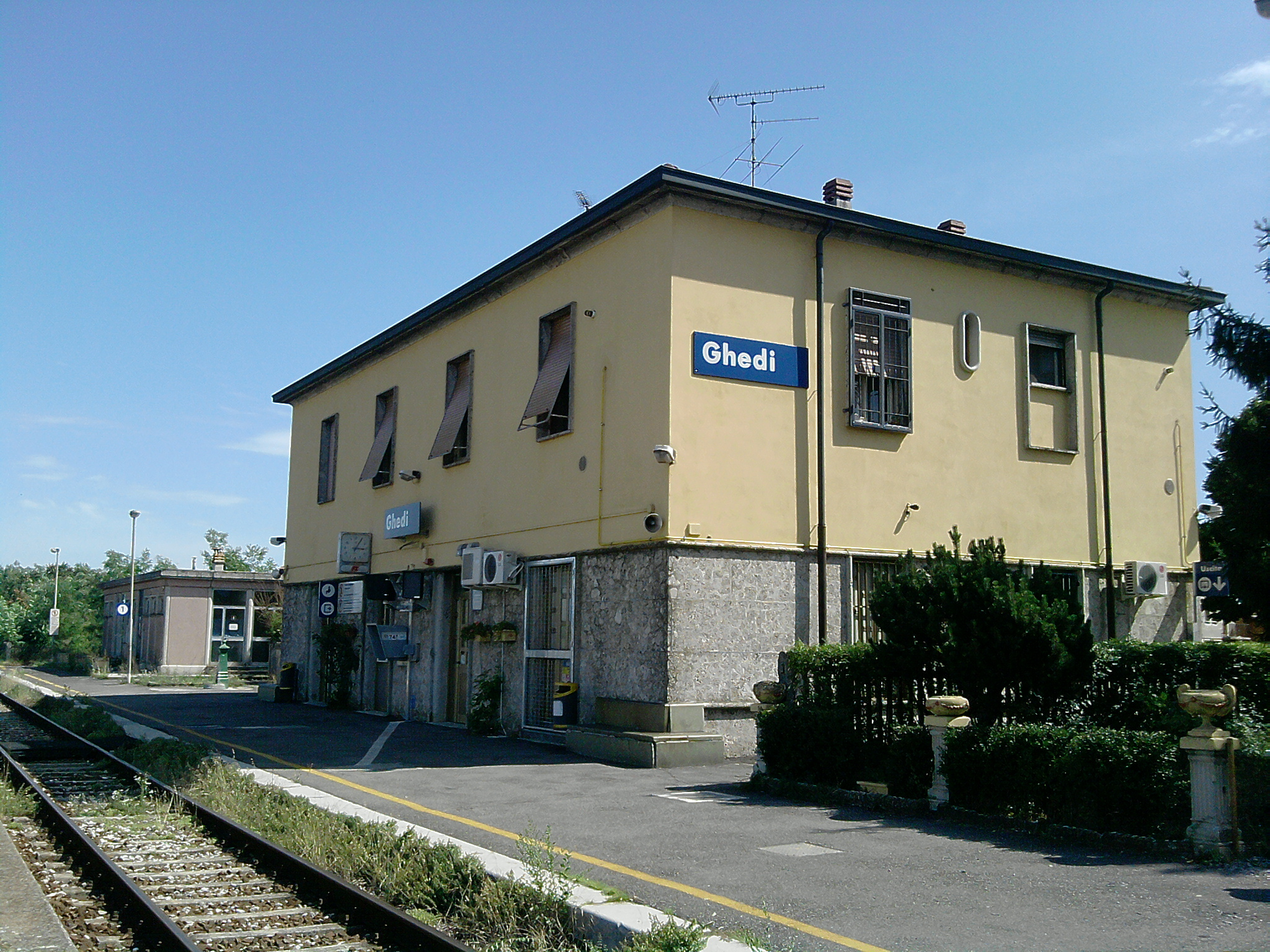
Ghedi railway station

The municipal territory is crossed by the Brescia–Parma railway. The settlement is served by the eponymous station, which opened when the line was inaugurated in 1893. As of 2012, the station has a yard with three tracks. Trenord regional trains traveling between Brescia and Parma stop at the station.

=== Airport ===
Ghedi is home to Ghedi Air Base, a Main operating base (MOB) under the NATO nuclear sharing Program. The base is supposed to house 20–40 B61-3, B61-4, and B61-7 nuclear bombs, but according to journalistic sources, it houses 60–100.

== Administration ==
Below is the list of mayors elected by the municipal council (1946–1995):

Period		Office holder	Party	Title	Notes
1 April 1946	28 July 1946	Franco Faraoni	DC	Mayor	
28 July 1946	23 November 1947	Adriano Giovanelli		Interim administrator	
23 November 1947	27 May 1951	Paolo Oneda	DC	Mayor	
27 May 1951	23 July 1953	Attilio Bonardi	DC	Mayor	
23 July 1953	16 June 1956	Paolo Perani	DC	Mayor	
16 June 1956	19 November 1960	Luigi Zappa	DC	Mayor	
19 November 1960	10 July 1970	Annibale Baresi	DC	Mayor	
10 July 1970	31 July 1975	Adelino Rossi	DC	Mayor	
31 July 1975	10 December 1976	Franco Ferrari	PSI	Mayor	
10 December 1976	15 September 1980	Corrado Marpicati	DC	Mayor	
15 September 1980	12 March 1981	Gianfausto Merigo	DC	Mayor	
12 March 1981	17 September 1981	Severino Cadini	PCI	Mayor	
17 September 1981	8 October 1985	Annibale Baresi	DC	Mayor	
8 October 1985	12 May 1987	Vincenzo Bonometti	PSI	Mayor	
12 May 1987	21 December 1992	Eugenio Baresi	DC	Mayor	
21 December 1992	24 April 1995	Silvio Favagrossa	DC	Mayor	

The list of mayors who were directly elected by citizens since 1995 is below:

Period		Office holder	Party	Title	Notes
April 24, 1995; 14 June 1999	14 June 1999; June 14, 2004	Osvaldo Scalvenzi	PDS; DS	Mayor	
14 June 2004	23 June 2009	Anna Giulia Guarneri	DL	Mayor	
June 23, 2009; 10 June 2014	10 June 2014; May 27, 2019	Lorenzo Borzi	LN; FdI-AN	Mayor	
May 27, 2019; 10 June 2024	10 June 2024 in office	Federico Casali	LN	Mayor	

== Sport ==
=== Football ===
One of the headquarters of A.S.D. Calcio Bassa Bresciana is located in Ghedi. The team competes in Promozione and was formed in 2016 from the merger of A.S.D. Calcio Ghedi and A.S.D. Bassa Bresciana of Isorella. The team plays its home matches at the Don Battista Colosio stadium in Isorella. The team colors are black, white, and red.

Other local teams are A.C.D. Ghedi 1978 and Real Ghedi A.S.D., both competing in Seconda Categoria.

== See also ==
- Battle of Ghedi
- Ghedi Air Base

== Bibliography ==
- Zamboni, Baldassarre. Relazione del solenne ingresso del Reverendissimo Signor Arciprete e Vicario Foraneo don Giuseppe Tedoldi, fatto in Ghedi il dì 13 maggio 1770, Brescia [Report of the Solemn Entry of the Most Reverend Archpriest and Forane Vicar Don Giuseppe Tedoldi, Made in Ghedi on 13 May 1770, Brescia].
- Zaccaria, F. A. (1767). Dell'antichissima Badia di Leno [About the Most Ancient Abbey of Leno]. Venice.
- Bonini, Angelo (1987). Ghedi, un paese nato intorno alla sua piazza [Ghedi, a Village Born Around Its Square]. Ghedi-Brescia: Cassa Rurale ed Artigiana dell'Agro Bresciano – Tipolitografia Queriniana.
- Bonini, Angelo (2008). La Chiesa Parrocchiale di S. Maria Assunta in Ghedi. Origini, storia, arte, società [The Parish Church of S. Maria Assunta in Ghedi. Origins, History, Art, Society]. Brescia: Fondazione Civiltà Bresciana. ISBN 978-88-559-0000-3. OCLC 878709231.
- Bonini, Angelo (2011). Ghedi 1848–1861. Un frammento della storia dell'unità d'Italia [Ghedi 1848-1861. A Fragment of the History of Italian Unity]. Brescia: BAMS. ISBN 978-88-905529-4-6.
- Bonini, Angelo (2012). Il santuario della Madonna di Caravaggio in Ghedi [The Sanctuary of the Madonna of Caravaggio in Ghedi]. Calcinato-Montichiari: Grafiche Tagliani – BAMS Edizioni. ISBN 978-88-905529-8-4. OCLC 828425024.
- Ferrari, Matteo; Foppoli, Marco (2009). Il bianco scaglione, Lo stemma del Comune di Ghedi nell'araldica civica lombarda delle origini [The white shield, the coat of arms of the Municipality of Ghedi in the original Lombard civic heraldry]. Ghedi: Tipolitografia Gandinelli.
- Bonini, Angelo (2016). Il convento di Santa Maria delle Grazie dei Padri francescani della Regolare osservanza in Ghedi [The Convent of Santa Maria delle Grazie of the Franciscan Fathers of the Regular Observance in Ghedi]. Bams Photo. ISBN 978-88-97941-16-3. OCLC 969825063.
- Fappani, Antonio (1982). "Ghedi (2)". Enciclopedia bresciana. Vol. 5. Brescia: La Voce del Popolo. OCLC 163181971.
- Chiara, Davide (1988). Alle porte del silenzio [At the Gates of Silence]. Brescia: Società editrice Vannini.
