= Vincenzo de Cotiis =

Italian artist, architect and designer

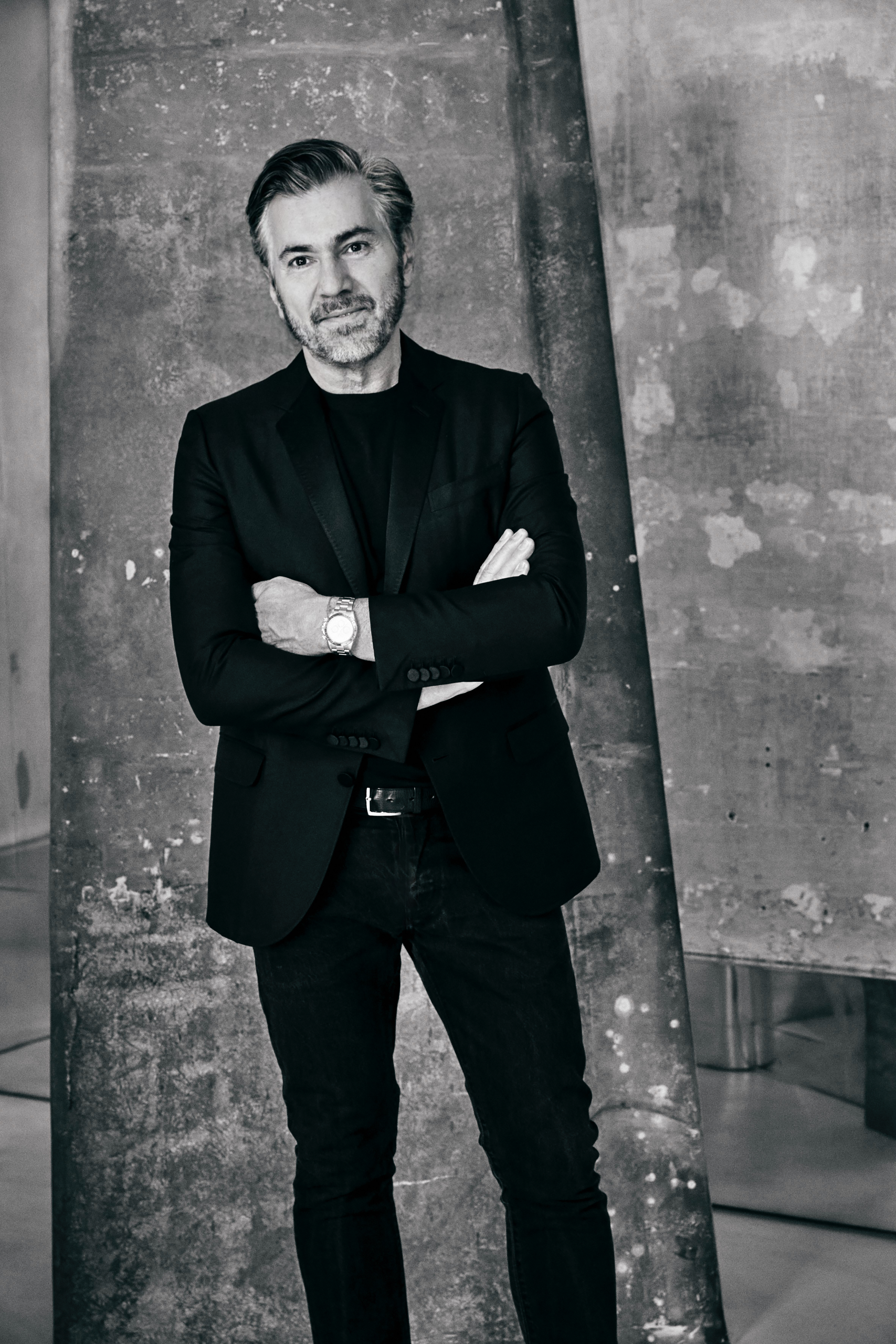
- de Cotiis in 2023
- Born: 1958 (age 67–68); Gonzaga, Italy
- Education: Politecnico di Milano
- Occupation: Artist

Vincenzo de Cotiis (born 1958) is an Italian artist known for interior designs and furniture, in a style termed "collectible design".

== Biography ==
Vincenzo De Cotiis was born in Gonzaga, Lombardy, Italy, in 1958. After studying architecture at the Politecnico di Milano in 1997, he founded Vincenzo De Cotiis Architects and Gallery in Milan, with his wife and business partner, Claudia Rose De Cotiis.

De Cotiis has worked on projects involving public spaces and private residences, as well as furniture design. He also collaborates with luxury brands, notably redesigning Burberry's flagship stores in London and Paris. He has also designed interiors for superyachts.

He featured on Architectural Digest magazine's annual list of Top 100 designers worldwide in 2021, described as "following in the footsteps of Italian maestros like Gio Ponti and Carlo Scarpa."

In 2021 De Cotiis was awarded the Elle Deco International Design Award for Best Interior Designer of the Year. His artworks have been exhibited at institutions such as Ca’ d’Oro in Venice on the occasion of the 2019 Venice Biennale. His work has been said to belong to the "collectible design" aesthetic movement.

In 2023, De Cotiis completed architectural renovations of the 15th century Palazzo Giustinian Lolin, on Venice's Grand Canal, as well as the restaurant and boardroom of the Grade-II listed Ladbroke Hall, Notting Hill, London.

His work Ode is in the permanent collection of the FENIX Museum of Migration in Rotterdam.

== Personal life ==
de Cotiis and his wife own houses in Milan, Pietrasanta, (Tuscany) and Venice.

== Exhibitions ==
In addition to exhibitions at his own Vincenzo de Cotiis Gallery in Milan, his solo exhibitions of artworks and furniture include:

- Je Marchais Pieds Nus Dans L’Étang, 2026, Carpenters New York
- Crossing Over, 2024, Carpenters Los Angeles
- Archaeology of Consciousness, 2023, Carpenters London
- Crossing Over, 2021, Carpenters Paris
- Éternel, 2021, Carpenters New York
- Éternel, 2019, Carpenters Paris
- En Plein Air, 2019, Carpenters San Francisco
- En Plein Air, 2018, Carpenters London
- Baroquisme, 2018, Carpenters New York
- Archaeo Black, 2017, Carpenters New York
