= Andrea Romitti =

Italian footballer (born 1919)

Personal information
- Date of birth: August 16, 1919
- Place of birth: Suzzara, Italy
- Position: Striker

Senior career*
Years	Team	Apps	(Gls)
1940–1942	Suzzara		
1942–1943	Ambrosiana-Inter	2	(0)
1943–1944	Suzzara	7	(3)
1945–1946	Suzzara		
- * Club domestic league appearances and goals

Andrea Romitti (born August 16, 1919) was an Italian professional football player.
