= Ghedi Castle =

Medieval castle in Ghedi, Lombardy, Italy

Coordinates: 45.4021°N 10.2768°E

- Ghedi, Lombardy, Italy
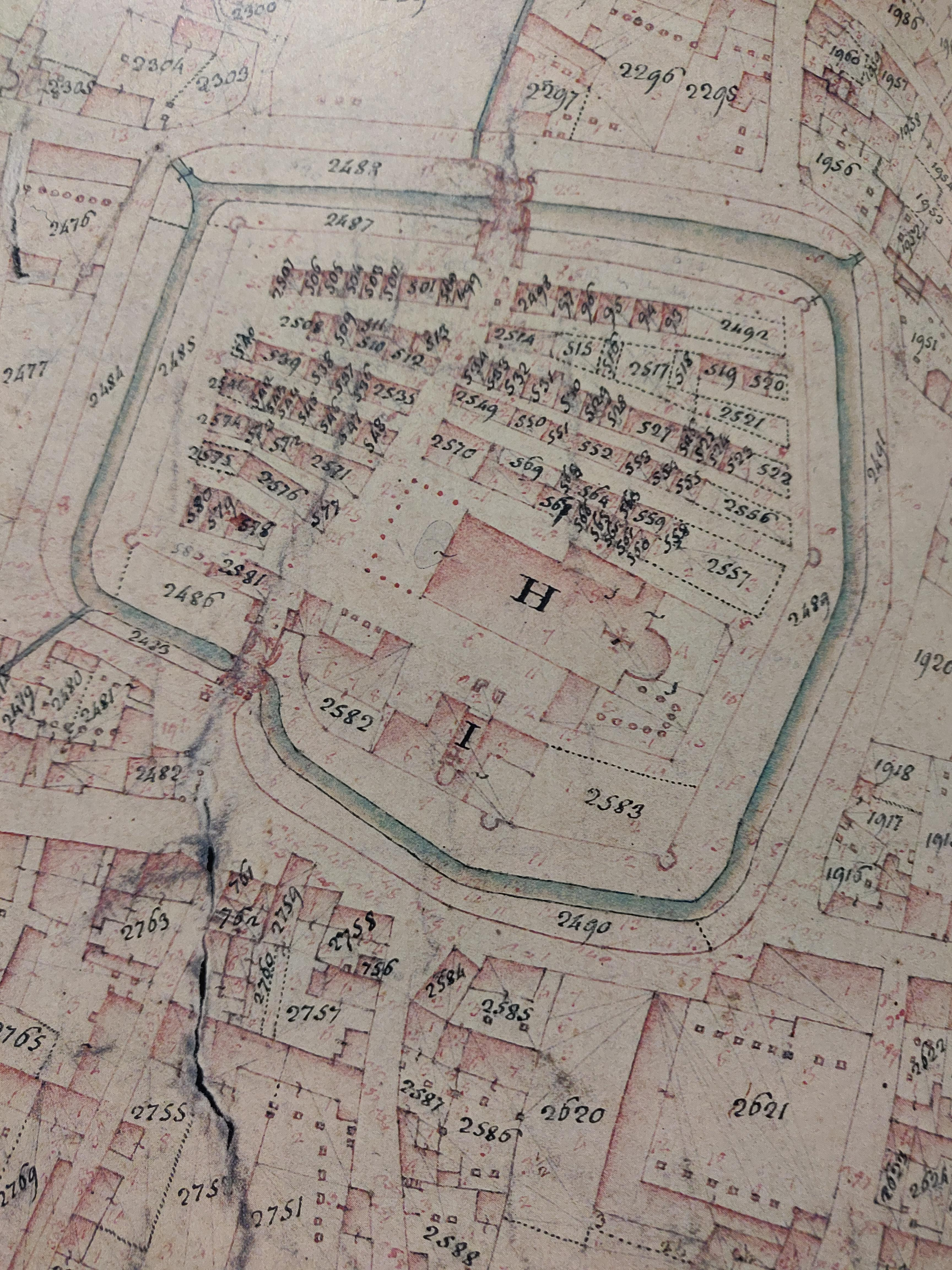
- The Napoleonic Cadastre was executed in 1810, highlighting the structure of the village's military defenses.

Site information
- Type: Medieval Castle
- Open to the public: no
- Condition: shot down

Site history
- Built: 12th-13th century
- In use: village defense
- Materials: Stones, mortar
- Demolished: 19th century
- Battles/wars: Battle of Ghedi, Ferrara War

The Ghedi Castle, which initially consisted of a wall built around the primitive settlement of Ghedi, was built in the early medieval age although the exact date of its construction is unknown. It was also remodeled several times over the centuries, partly because of the numerous sieges it suffered and the new war armaments implemented by rival armies.

== History ==
=== The formation of the fortified village ===
In the absence of historical documents that can report the dating of a first building, and the development of the primitive walled enclosure, its construction is conventionally circumscribed around the twelfth-thirteenth century: in fact, it was in this period that the town of Ghedi, recognized as a Communitas, and therefore no longer as a small group of individuals, began to assume importance in the chessboard of the Brescian territory. The juridical, economic-administrative, and political organization of the town became increasingly consolidated, so much so that, from the work of the Ghedi archivist Angelo Maria Franchi, the Annals, several purchases of houses, land, water rights, and large plots of arable fields are noted. Since, therefore, the town of Ghedi was in full growth, a clash between the newborn municipality and the influential abbey of Leno, about the management of some state-owned lands, was configured as inevitable; the querelle was finally amicably resolved in 1366 also thanks to the mediating activity of the nobleman from Brescia Giovanni Chizzola.

Parallel to this rise of the medieval village, the city walls certainly had to grow in importance as well: it can certainly be said that the castle in 1319 had been armed and tested for quite some time. It was precisely its active function as a fortress and its strategically favorable position that attracted the attention of the city of Brescia, which, in a move to consolidate its influence in the territory, sought to subdue the city of Ghedi as well. The smaller rural municipalities, after all, ensured the mother cities a supply of labor for the construction of city buildings, the completion of public works, the collection of taxes and fees, as well as the supply of men-at-arms for their armies. No surprise, then, that in 1302 a small armed contingent, offered by Ghedi, helped the Brescian capital quell some revolts in the Camonica Valley, just as, if in 1310, a handful of soldiers were made available to resist the siege of Brescia of Emperor Arrigo VII.

Despite Ghedi's subordinate relationship to the city acts of rebellion certainly did not lack: in 1306 the lord-bishop of Brescia Berardo Maggi imposed on the commune the payment of a fine of ten thousand pounds, being guilty of having offered shelter to Tebaldo Brusato and his subordinates; it was perhaps because of the failure to pay the large fine that in 1307 the Brescians attacked the Ghedi castle, which in the meantime had turned to the city of Cremona in search of protection, and whose troops had barricaded themselves in the military structure. Nevertheless, their defeat came in short order, and the Brescian capital imposed an even harsher fine, this time of twenty thousand Brescian liras. Brescia's desire to keep Ghedi under its dominion is thus evident, and, if for the other rural municipalities of the Bassa Bresciana the reasons were purely economic and territorial, the Ghedese constitutes precisely a case apart: given the presence of the castle, which constituted a potential outpost for Brescian troops, Ghedi was configured as a particularly desirable town. This is evidenced by an episode from 1319 narrated by Abbot Zamboni, who reports thus:

Intrinsic Brescians, who were Guelphs, assisted by the Bolognese, and the Florentines, besieged Ghedi, and beating it with machines, took it back, leading prisoners in Brescia one hundred and fifty of the principal Gibellini, who watched the prisons for seven years.

— B. Zamboni, Report on the Solemn Entrance of the Most Reverend Archpriest and Rural Dean Don Giuseppe Tedoldi, made in Ghedi, 1770, p. XV

Also reported by Zamboni in his work, in January 1320, there was another episode of retaliation against the Mother City, Brescia, which was nevertheless determined not to lose its hegemony over the Ghedese municipality:

The exiles from Brescia, together with the Veronese, surprise the castle once again... they kill forty men and take seventy prisoners to Verona, who are forced to regain their freedom by paying a hefty ransom.

— B. Zamboni, Report on the Solemn Entrance of the Most Reverend Archpriest and Rural Dean Don Giuseppe Tedoldi, made in Ghedi, 1770, p. XV

=== The development of the castle ===
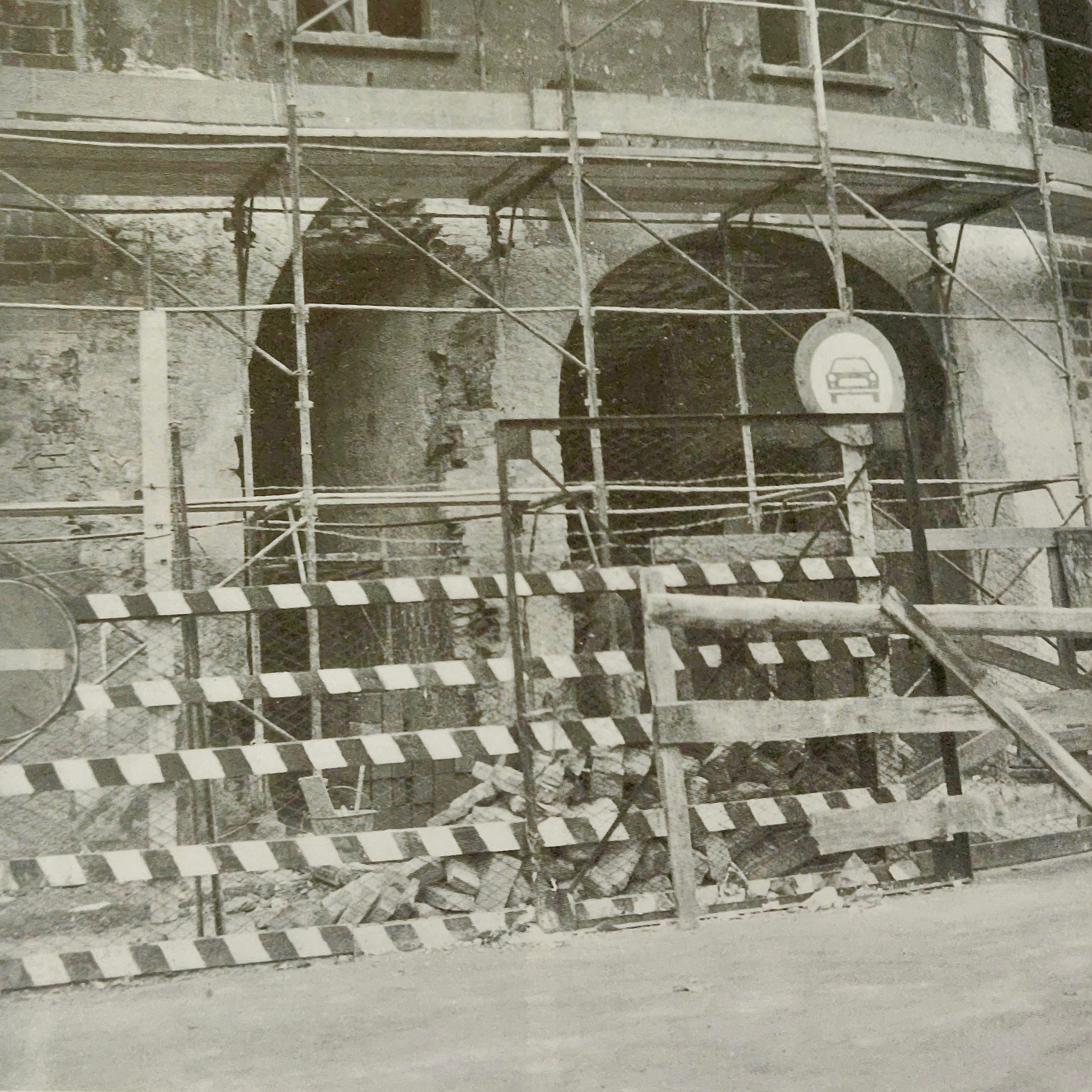
The southern entrance to Ghedi Castle, attached to the town hall building, reappeared in its original grandeur during restoration in 1981.

The city walls, in its first very modest construction, during the 14th century must surely have been quite different and much more similar to a real castle surrounded by mighty walls; the moats, already certainly existing in the early 14th century, were later enlarged and made more obstructive to passage: throughout the century, as already pointed out, the municipality of Ghedi had the opportunity to develop and grow in prestige both economically and militarily, and also from a purely demographic point of view. Thus arose the first settlements outside the walls, and with them also the traditional four villages, the so-called “quadre,” of which today only the name is remembered:

- Bassina, located south of the castle;
- Borgo Gazzolo, also called Contrada Palazzo (probably following the construction of Palazzo Orsini), which reached as far as the western moat of the castle;
- Borgonuovo, so called perhaps because it arose last (it was also called Borgo della Serriola della Fossa or Borgo di S. Lucia, due to the presence of a church named after St. Lucy) in the northern part of the walls;
- Malborgo or via di Montechiaro, which extended to the east. As already pointed out, the municipality of Ghedi was involved, during the 14th century, in numerous bloody clashes between the ranks of the Guelphs and Ghibellines, then the Visconti and the Scaligeri, respectively; precisely because of these wars that took place over a short period, the castle and its walls suffered several sieges and were thus destroyed several times. One of the many events is again reported by Abbot Zamboni:

1361 – Lord Can, Lord of Verona, launched an attack on the territory of Brescia and took Ghedi along with several other castles, which, once they were recaptured by Barnabò Visconti, were left demolished.

— B. Zamboni, Report on the Solemn Entrance of the Most Reverend Archpriest and Rural Dean Don Giuseppe Tedoldi, made in Ghedi, 1770, p. XV

=== A history of wars ===
The military vocation of the town of Ghedi therefore remained central to the dynamics of the community, so much so that in 1436 the latter was exempted by the captain general of the Serenissima and Marquis of Mantua Francesco Gonzaga from paying extraordinary contributions, so that already the town was able to offer accommodation to more than 300 army horses and that the walls of the village needed reconstruction ex novo; we also know from the Diary of Pandolfo Nassino, citizen of Brescia and Vicar of Ghedi, that on April 8, 1437: “fo messa la prima preda del fabricar del castello de gedi."Among other things, Nassino had occasion to note inscriptions that formed a “memoria notata et scripta sotto la logetta che è nella parte de sera alla piazza de gedi a mezzo dì alla porta del castello,” reported in turn in 1666 by the Ghedese notary Mamentino: “1437 - La terra di Ghedi trovandosi assai populata, e doviziosa fece fabbricar il castello nel mezzo d'essa Terra con le sue fosse e terrapieni molto bello, essendo Doge di Venezia Pietro Candiano.”

In 1438, however, the walls must not have been ready at all when the Visconti troops, in the pay of Niccolò Piccinino, imposed themselves on the Venetian troops of Gattamelata, reflexively conquering Ghedi as well; the town would return to Venetian hands a short time later, in 1440, thanks to the then captain general of the Republic, the condottiere Francesco Sforza. Because of the extensive damage the castle suffered, on June 16, 1438, Ghedi was granted 200 imperial liras per year for four years and exemptions for another four years from the contribution for the fortresses of Bresciano, having to provide for its castle.”: It was indeed in the interest of the Serenissima to protect the city of Ghedi and its delicate position as an important outpost and crucial junction in the chessboard of the Lombard territory.

It was precisely under the Venetian republic that Ghedi took on a role of extreme importance in the war events of the time, partly because of an ever-increasing Venetian commitment to protecting its western front threatened especially by the Duchy of Milan: in fact, an episode narrated by the Brescian historian Cristoforo da Soldo is memorable, namely the siege waged against Ghedi between June 29 and July 6, 1453, in the so-called Battle of Ghedi; Francesco Sforza himself, who had become Duke of Milan, had formed an alliance with the Marquis of Mantua and aimed to expand his possessions, in line with the previous Visconti policy. The castle was therefore besieged and attacked at a weak point, a bastia (which the Venetian republic had had filled in knowing it to be a possible breach, but evidently to no avail), and thereafter the bombards were lined up: the walls were continually hit by powerful shells, a total of 295, for a total of five days; the Ghedese finally asked for a day's truce to meditate on what to do. They therefore surrendered only on the condition that their lives were saved and their property remained intact. Cristoforo da Soldo's account of this event is therefore an important source to refer to:

The next night, they rose from that place and came to Gaido to encamp, with this order: that Count Francesco also rose that night and came to camp. And thus again, he left Seniga and came to Gaido to join him. Seeing the army of the Signoria (of Venice) that Count Francesco had raised, they immediately rose from Pontevico and came to position themselves in Porzano, after Count Francesco, four miles from Ghedi. Immediately, Count Francesco set up the bombards, and on the 30th of June, he took the bastion that had been constructed by those of our Signoria near the castle…

Returning to the matter of Count Francesco, he bombarded the town of Gaido until the 5th of July. On that day, they came to parley and agreed upon a one-day truce, which was set for the 6th of July, with the condition that both goods and persons would be spared. And so it was done on the said day at the 22nd hour.

The camp of the Signoria, which had more people than his and was at Porzano, never wished to give him aid, saying that the Signoria of Venice did not want to risk its dominion for the sake of Gaido. Once he had finished there, he had it fortified, and had part of the surrounding area flattened, which had been enclosed by the Signoria; likewise, he had the tower of Montirone fortified, which is above Gaido, two miles away, and there he built a very strong bastion.

— "The Chronicle of Cristoforo da Soldo", Rerum Italicarum scriptores, Bologna, 1938, volume XXII, part III, p. 120-121

It was thus thanks to these new munitions works that the castle probably took on the definitive appearance of a real fortress, also by the Ghedesi's desire to make it as imposing and substantial as possible. It was precisely the inhabitants of the village, in 1463, who requested a tax exemption of duties from the Serenissim to enhance the defensive capacity of the structure; the following year, the municipality purchased land from the Contrade Piazza and Gazzolo to widen the castle's ditch and road. Although the military building during the 15th century was improved and made more hostile to siege, this was of little use during the ruinous military campaign of the War of Ferrara, fought between the Serenissima and the League formed by Ludovico il Moro, Lorenzo de' Medici, the papalists of Pope Sixtus IV and Ferdinand of Aragon, all of whom intervened in defense of the Marquis of Ferrara Ercole I d'Este. The chronicler Jacopo Melga reports in his chronicles this clash, which certainly shook the entire Brescian territory, especially for the vehemence and impetus of the attack conducted. The Duke of Calabria Alfonso of Aragon, on August 21, 1483:

Se partete da la ditta terra di Leno et andò a campo alla terra de Gedo, et per prima fece exortare li homini de quella terra che si volesseno rendere et non aspettar colpo alchuno di bombarda, che invero gli daria il malanno e la mala pasqua, et questo fu alli 21 del ditto mese (agosto) di notte, ma li homini si volseno tignir forti quanto potevano, et cossì furno tratti certi colpi di bombarde in le muraglie dil Castello, per la qual cosa a botta per botta ruinava de boni squarzi de la muraglia, la qual era cattiva muraglia fatta de prede tonde di campagna, et vedendo questo li ditti homini non volseno aspettar ultimum terribilium, ma se reseno.

He departed from the so-called land of Leno and went to the field of the land of Ghedi, and first of all had the inhabitants of that land exhorted to surrender so as not to receive any bombard blows, which in all honesty would have caused them both great damage and wrath. This happened on the night of the 21st of the aforementioned month (August). But the inhabitants wanted to resist as much as possible, and so certain bombard shots were directed against the castle walls, causing good portions of the wall to collapse shot after shot, as it was a poorly built wall made of round fieldstones. Seeing this, the inhabitants did not want to await their complete ruin, and thus surrendered.

— J. Melga, Chronicle, in Unpublished Brescian Chronicles, vol. I, Brescia, 1930, pp. 60–61

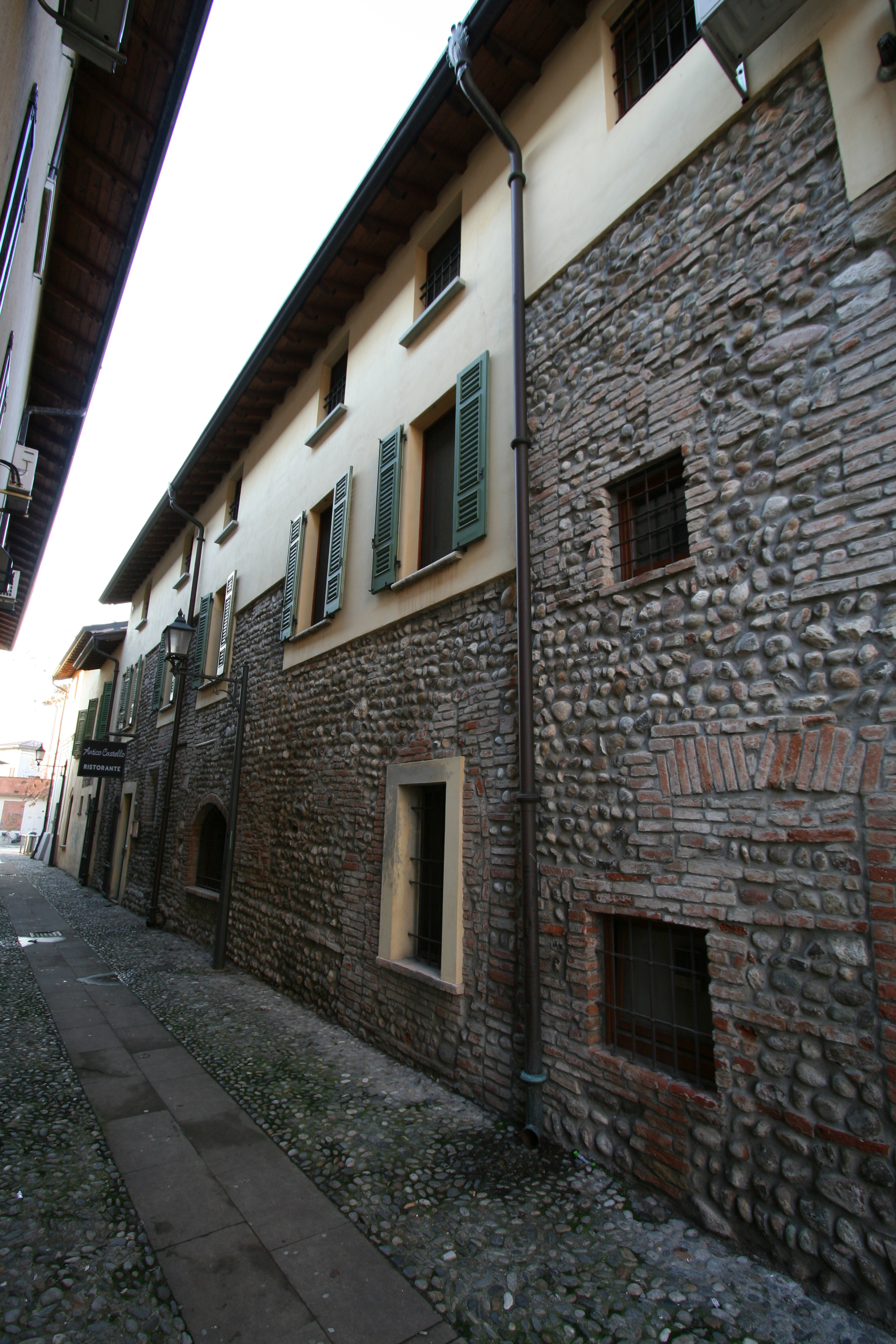
A glimpse of Via Castello, in the historic center of Ghedi

Melga himself missed no opportunity to praise the valor of the Ghedes and to return to the gory nature of the event, reporting that:

Al fatto de Gedo avendo li ditti homini di quella terra tolto termino ad rendersi como è ditto de sopra, si resero el ditto di 21 ditto alli inimici, a patto salve le robbe e le persone, et è da notare che se lo muro dil castello della de la ditta terra fusse sta de prede vive, como era quello de Bressa, perché era de prede cerigne campagnole rotunde, li homini di la terra como sempre fidelissimi di la nostra Illustrissima Signoria di Venetia cum difficultade credo l'averiano possuto conquistare; ma el duca de Calabria gli aveva posto doi bombarde de grossezza de più d'un brazo, le quali a ogni botta et colpo che trasevano in lo muro del Castello zitava a terra grandi squarsi de muro ita che fu urgente necessitate alle homini di la terra a redurse al ditto duca, salve le robbe et le persone, come sopra ho ditto.

Regarding the matter of Ghedi, where its men refused to surrender as mentioned above, they did in fact surrender on the already cited date of August 21 to the enemy, on the condition that their lives and possessions be spared. It is worth noting that, if the walls of the castle of Ghedi had been made of live spoil, like those of Brescia—because indeed they were made of round rural spoil—those men, always loyal to the Most Illustrious Lordship of Venice, I believe would have been overcome only with great difficulty. But the Duke of Calabria positioned against them two bombards wider than an arm's length, and with each shot and bombardment that passed through the castle walls, large sections of the walls were thrown to the ground, making it necessary for the inhabitants to surrender to the Duke, with their lives and possessions spared, as already mentioned above.

— J. Melga, Chronicle, in Unpublished Brescian Chronicles, vol. I, Brescia, 1930, p. 65

The village of Ghedese thus enjoyed under Venetian rule a leading role in both territorial expansion and defensive policy: over the years Guidobaldo da Montefeltro, duke of Urbino, and also Sforza Pallavicino, as well as Niccolò Orsini, count of Pitigliano and Nola, passed through it, and even established his residence there, Palazzo Orsini, beginning with his appointment as captain general of the Serenissima in 1495. Since he was granted large fiefs in the lands of Asola, Malpaga, Montirone, and Leno, Orsini held the annual exhibitions of his troops mainly in the Ghedi area: wanting to demonstrate the order and good state of the soldiers, he held an exhibition there as early as June 31, 1496; in 1503, for example, they were held in Soresina, Martinengo, Lovadino Ravenna, and Mestre (as well as Ghedi, of course), as reported by Marin Sanudo in his Diaries.

However, the Venetian defeat at the Battle of Agnadello in 1509 downsized the ambitions the commune had up to that point: the events of the League of Cambrai led in fact to the definitive decline of the Ghedi castle, until then a crucial junction in the military dynamics of the Serenissima; an event that describes the descending parabola of both the city of Ghedi and the Republic, is narrated in the Storia d'Italia by Guicciardini, the death of Bartolomeo d'Alviano within the walls of the village:

...who, sick at Ghedi in the Brescia area, less than sixty years of age, passed in the first days of October, to the great displeasure of the Viniziani, to the other life...

— Francesco Guicciardini, Storia d'Italia,1561

Again, in 1529 the Lansquenets descended into Italy and besieged the fortified village as well, which in vain put up a futile resistance in itself: the castle was in fact sacked and set on fire.

=== The topography of the castle and the village ===
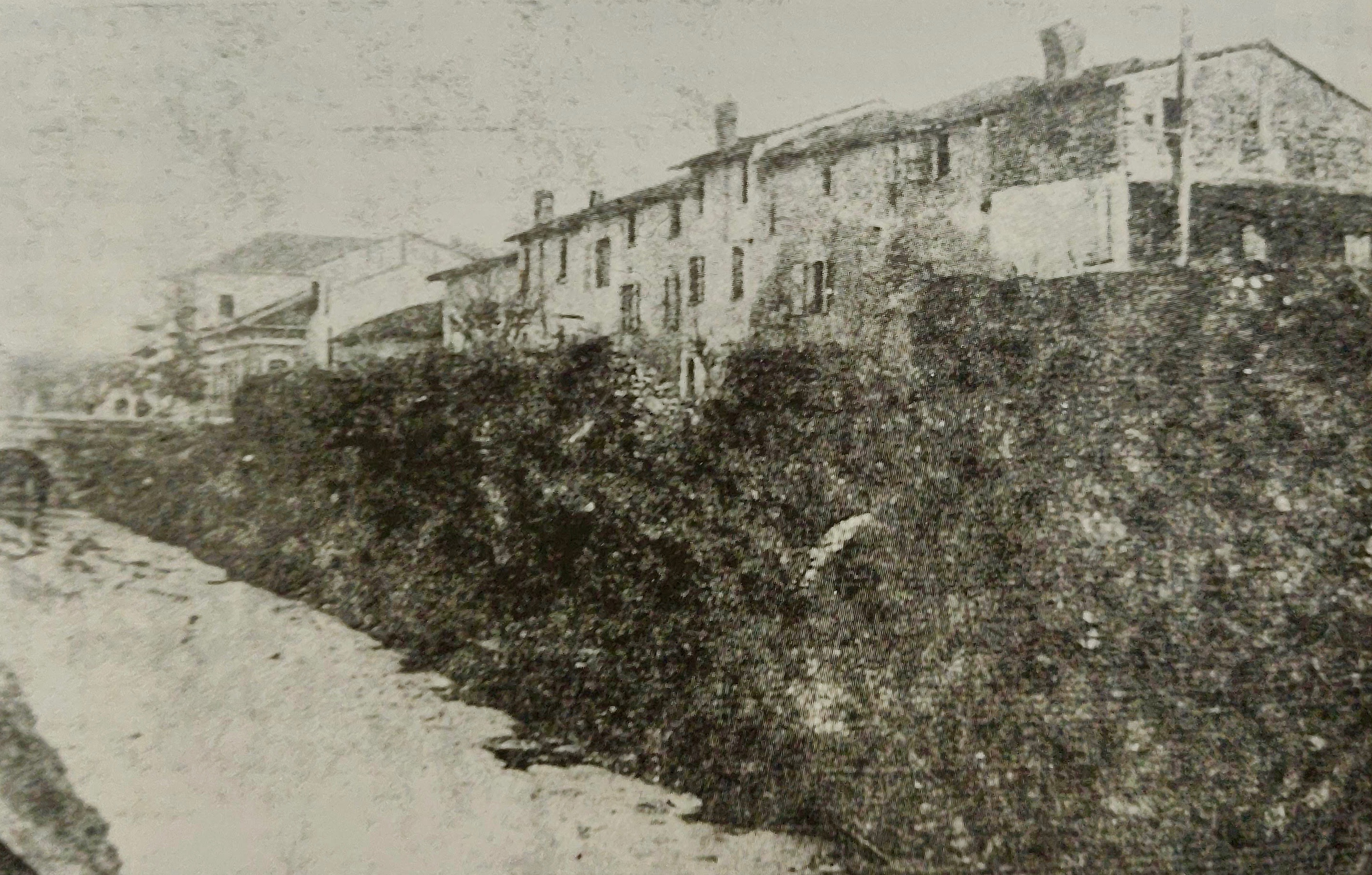
One of the last photos depicting the moat to the north of the wall, later filled in the early 1900s for the construction of the new elementary schools

Podesta Giovanni Da Lezze drew up, on December 27, 1610, on his return from an expedition to the Brescia area on behalf of the Serenissima, a detailed report and meticulous description of the castle itself to the Venetian senate, which was therefore useful in understanding its layout and function at the time. Such are his words:

Ghedi, Head of a Quadra with two lands, namely Led and Montirone, land situated on the plain about ten miles from Brescia, surrounded by territory of about seven miles in circumference and approximately three miles wide. There is a castle enclosed by strong, thick, and high walls with good moats around it, filled with running water. The walls have five bastions with earthen ramparts, encompassing about half a mile, with two gates and drawbridges. Within the castle, there are around 160 houses, eight of which are inhabited by poor people; the rest are used by locals as granaries and for storing hemp, which is maintained and not destroyed. It is one of the strongest and significant towns in the territory, counted among the thirteen, with a large portion of farmland. Inside, there is the communal house, quite comfortable, where the Most Illustrious Captains are usually hosted. Also inside is the church dedicated to the Assumption of the Madonna, a parish with an archpriest and two curates. The archpriest has an income of about one hundred scudi, and the right of patronage belongs to the community. The two curates receive 200 lire each, one paid by the archpriest and the other by the said community. There are about 500 hearths (families) outside the castle, totaling 3,500 souls, of which about 800 or more are farm laborers, and the rest are elderly, women, and children [...].

— Giovanni Da Lezze, Il Catastico Bresciano, 1973

The function of the walls had thus been downsized from, for example, a century earlier, given the undisputed devastating power of firearms against which the modest walls were of little use. It was with this in mind that, given the no longer relevant function as a stronghold, the premises of the castle and town hall were modernized, making them at least more convenient and usable for both civil and administrative tasks.

=== The urban modification of the square ===
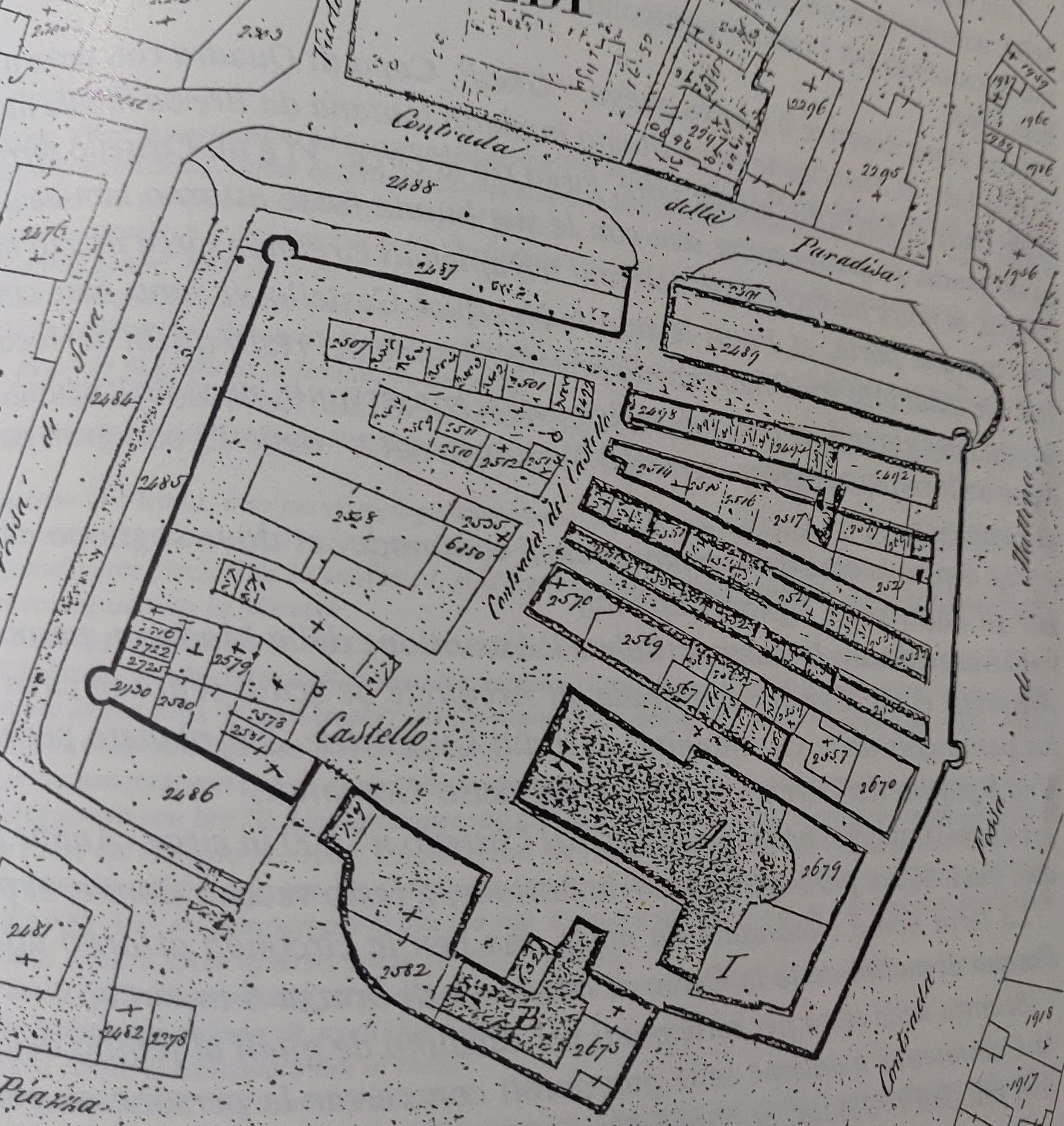
The Austrian Land Registry compiled in 1852 shows how the town's urban planning projects were aimed at tearing down the hamlet.

The Austrian land register compiled in 1852 shows how the moat on the eastern side had been filled in, as had much of that on the southern side: the walls were then knocked down and with them two towers as well, filling in the area of them and the ditches to enlarge the rectangular-shaped square, although no precise date remains to indicate when such architectural measures were undertaken; undoubtedly the contrada piazza was able to gain space, since the walls with the moat attached occupied approximately fifteen meters, i.e., a large space of today's Piazza Roma. On the other hand, the second enlargement of the square, which was carried out after filling in the moat of the walls, was certainly carried out in 1874: in the new garden square, the old cemetery to the south of the church was demolished and part of the northern moat filled in, the Thursday market was habitually held; in 1924, among other things, a statue of Bernardino Boifava was placed in memory of the fallen soldiers of World War I.

The 1895 cadastral map of the Kingdom of Italy offers further insight into the urban plan of the square: in addition to the measures already taken up to that time the Administration planned the construction of a complex of elementary schools and a kindergarten, with the consequent elimination of the now dilapidated barracks from the medieval period. Architect Luigi Arcioni, then already engaged in the restoration of the parish church, was in charge of designing the building of the new elementary schools, and which was approved, after some modifications, on July 20, 1891; finished construction in little more than a year, in 1893, the inauguration saw the presence of officials from neighboring municipalities and also from the capital, Brescia.

=== The municipal building ===
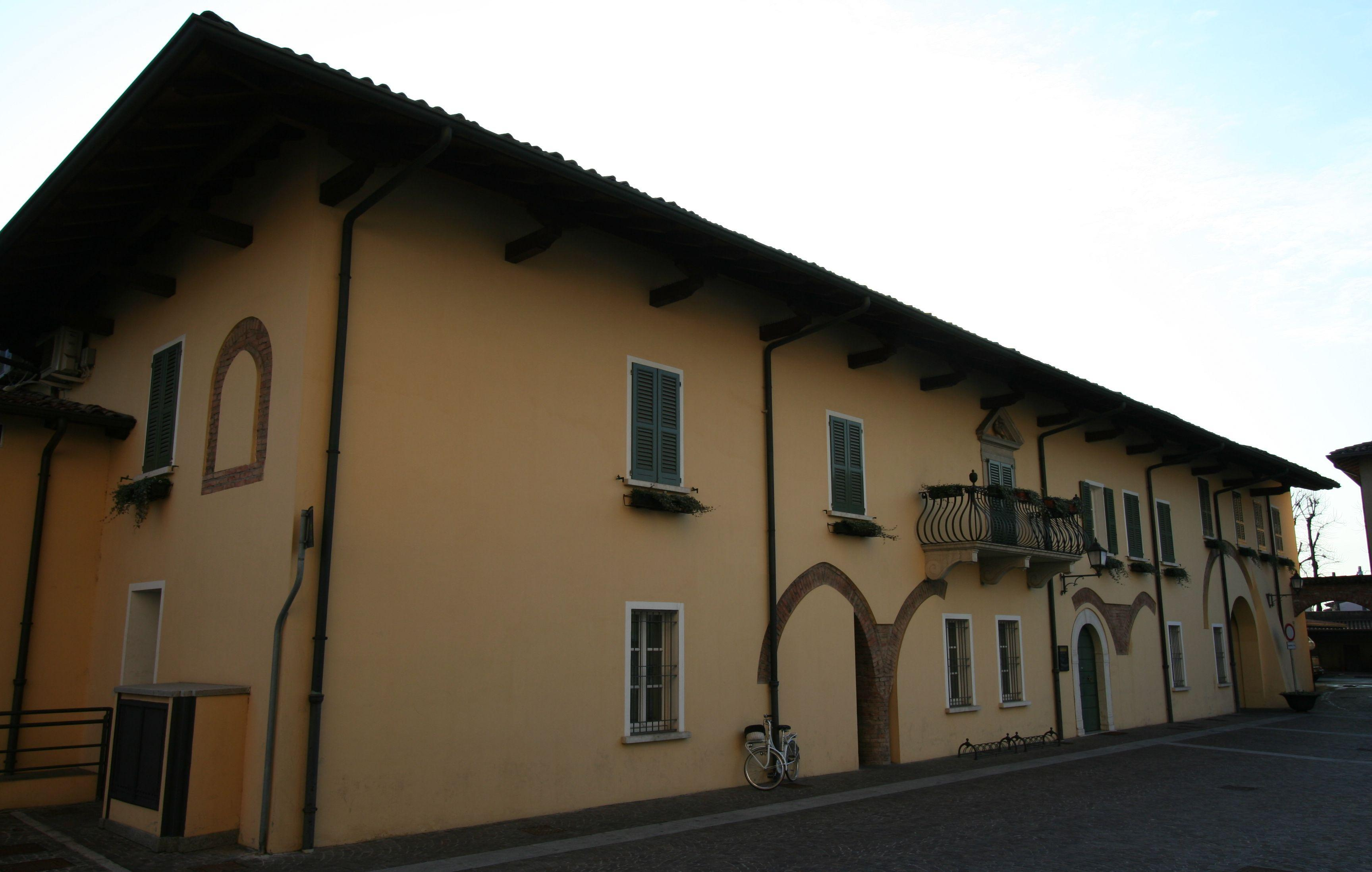
The northern side of the municipal building faces the parish church.

The castle, during the 14th century, included within it the ancient 14th-century parish church that served as the parish, the 14th-century town hall, built close to the southern gate of the castle itself, and the modest houses that first sprang up in the original settlement; in the morning (south) of the church, moreover, was a churchyard, i.e., a small necropolis with a wide roof supported by four pillars, three of which are visible in the Napoleonic land register of 1810, and which often hosted outdoor gatherings. Restorations held between 1980 and 1982 of the town hall uncovered the structure of the ancient broletto, probably dating from the early 15th century. Attached to the municipal house and near the parish church was the old Suffrage of the Dead church in the castle, which was abandoned around the turn of the 19th century; it was purchased by the municipality, which used it as an archive building, while from the 1980s, following restoration, it serves as the entrance to the council chamber of the municipality.

The rear façade of the town hall, which faces the parish church, formerly consisted of a portico of five ogival bays in terracotta, as did the columns with cubic-shaped capitals; the vestments must also have been in terracotta, although subsequent “restoration” work has affected the surface. It was precisely in this building, inspired by the ancient Lombard broletti, that meetings of the local vicinia were held, beginning in 1366: following its establishment, and presided over in Ghedi, this new body tended to meet in the great hall (Note: "Super sala superiori domus communes de Gaydo" - In Medieval Latin (English: "Above the upper hall of the communal house of Gaydo")) of the municipal palace, on the main floor. Throughout the 15th century, however, the town council sealed the various civil contracts in various places in the castle and the town hall itself, especially at the bench where the mayors carried out their duties and which was also located near the southern gate of the castle. (Note: The Municipal Magistrates' Bench first appears in 1455.)

Certain occasions, however, required that the relevant documents be initialed in suitable facilities, that is, in the elegant town hall; in 1467, for example, a deed was initialed in a room on the ground floor of the building, which, moreover, was equipped with a fireplace. (Note: "In terra de Ghaido districtu Brixie in caminata terrena domorum Communis de Ghaido sita in castro dicte terre." - In Latin (English: "In the land of Ghaido, in the district of Brescia, in the ground-level walkway of the houses of the Commune of Ghaido, located in the castle of said land.")) The main hall of the town hall was also used in several situations and for the signing of instrumenta venditionis, (Note: Between July 18 and August 9, 1487.) as was the ground-floor portico overlooking the parish square, the “revolto,” which is now sealed. It was not until the 16th century, however, that a chancery office was established for the municipality, (Note: "In cancellaria comunis Gaydi posita in domibus in quibus pro dicto comunis iura redduntur sitis in castello terre Gaydi districtus Brixie" - In Latin (English: In the chancellery of the commune of Ghedi, located in the buildings where justice is administered on behalf of the said commune, situated in the castle of the land of Ghedi, district of Brescia.")) probably located near the lower drawbridge of the castle: this office would later be either moved or at least renovated, as later agreements are signed: “in cancellaria nova communis Gaydi.”

== Bibliography ==
- Bonini, Angelo (1987). Ghedi un paese nato intorno alla sua piazza [Ghedi a town born around its square] (in Italian). Italy: \Ghedi! : Cassa rurale ed artigiana dell'agro bresciano. p. 133.
- da Lezze, Giovanni (1609). Catastico bresciano [Brescian Catastic] (in Italian). Brescia: Casa Editrice F. Apollonio & C. Brescia.
- Fappani, Antonio (1982). "Enciclopedia bresciana - Ghedi 2" [Brescian Encyclopedia - Ghedi 2]. La Voce del Popolo (in Italian). 5.
- Ferrari, M.; Foppoli, M. (1434). "Archivio comunale di Ghedi" [municipal archives of Ghedi]. Tipolitografia Gandinelli (in Italian).
- Guicciardini, Francesco (1561). Storia d'Italia Libro XII, Capitolo XVII [History of Italy Book XII, Chapter XVII] (in Italian).
- Muratori, Lodovico Antonio (1732). Rerum Italicarum scriptores ab anno aerae christianae quingentesimo ad millesimumquingentesimum [Writers of Italian Affairs from the Year 500 to 1500 of the Christian Era] (in Latin). Mediolani.
- Odorici, Frederico (1856). Storie Bresciane dai primi tempi sino all'età nostra, Volume 6 [Brescian histories from the earliest times to our age, Volume 6] (in Italian). Brescia: Gilberti. p. 379.
- Sanuto, Marino (1879). I Diarii di Marino Sanuto [The Diaries of Marino Sanuto] (in Italian). Austria: Visentini.
- Zamboni, Camillo Baldassarre (1770). Relazione del solenne ingresso del Reverendissimo Signor Arciprete e Vicario Foraneo don Giuseppe Tedoldi, fatto in Ghedi il dì 13 maggio 1770, Brescia [Report of the solemn entry of the Most Reverend Mr. Archpriest and Vicar Foraneo Don Giuseppe Tedoldi] (in Italian).
