= Gonzaga, Lombardy =

Gonzaga Gunsàga (Emilian)
- Comune
- Comune di Gonzaga
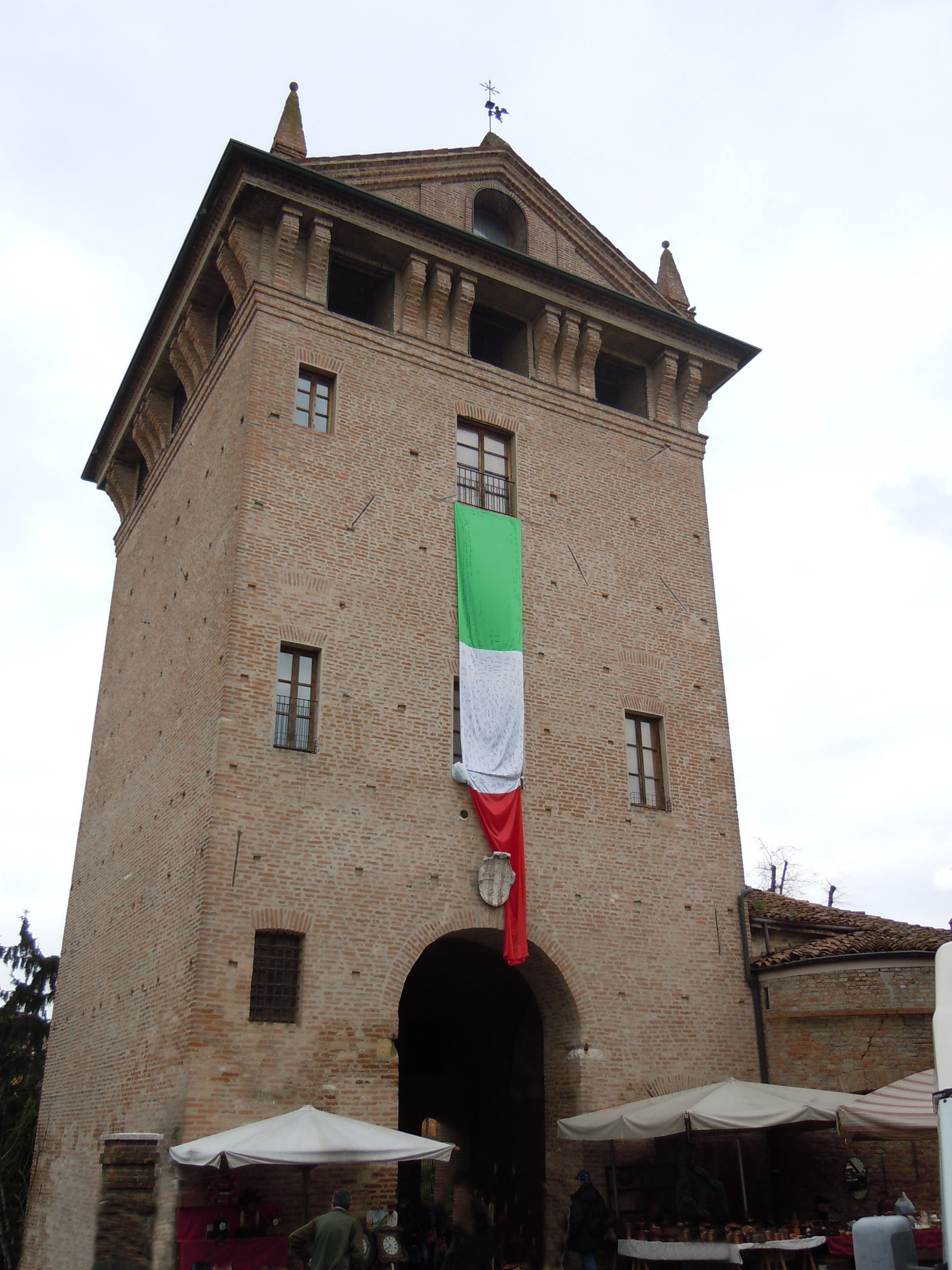

- Coat of arms

- Location within Italy Location within Lombardy
- Coordinates: 44°57′N 10°49′E
- Country: Italy
- Region: Lombardy
- Province: Mantua (MN)
- Frazioni: Palidano, Bondeno

Government
  - Mayor: Claudio Terzi

Area
  - Total: 49.8 km^{2} (19.2 sq mi)
- Elevation: 22 m (72 ft)

Population (31 July 2014)
  - Total: 9,107
  - Density: 183/km^{2} (474/sq mi)
- Demonym: Gonzaghesi
- Time zone: UTC+1 (CET)
  - Summer (DST): UTC+2 (CEST)
- Postal code: 46023
- Dialing code: 0376
- Website: Official website

Gonzaga (Upper Mantuan: Gunsàga) is a comune (municipality) in the Province of Mantua in the Italian region Lombardy, located about 140 kilometres (87 mi) southeast of Milan and about 25 kilometres (16 mi) south of Mantua. Located in a region known as the "Lower Mantuan" (Bassa Mantovana) is notable for being the ancestral home of the House of Gonzaga, rulers of the Duchy of Mantua between 1328 and 1707.

== Geography ==
Gonzaga borders the following municipalities: Luzzara, Moglia, Pegognaga, Reggiolo, Suzzara.

== History ==
=== Antiquity ===
Nearby Bronze and Iron Age sites have been identified at "Beccazzola" in the comune in Poggio Rusco and the località "Dosso" of San Benedetto Po', showing the area of lower Mantua to have been inhabited from ancient times by people associated with the archeological culture of Villanova. In later centuries nearby Mantua in particular was a center of note for the Etruscans and the neighboring Boii Gauls. The landscape and fortunes of northern Italy were soon transformed by their incorporation into the Roman Republic. In 218 A.D. Roman settlers founded towns in southern Lombardy at Cremona and Piacenza, bringing the Po valley under their influence and political control. Roman dominance was soon reinforced by the establishment of further Roman colonies at Bologna, Parma and Modena, and the transformation of Mantua into a Roman city.

Roman remains have been found in Gonzaga too, showing the current village was likely the site of farmsteads, cultivated fields and most likely a wealthy homestead. On the 30 November 1979 in localitá Prati Fiera a Roman-era homestead was uncovered and partially investigated by archeological survey, yielding a number of ceramic sherds - one partially inscribed, and all dated to the 1st century CE. Later archeological surveys undertaken at Corte Merzetelle, Laghetto and Cadellora (all localities in the municipality) also recovered and described Roman-era ceramic sherds. Finally Roman-era coins dating to the reign of Augustus, Hadrian and Constantine were recovered by private individuals at Corte Fosse Scura, where archeological survey also identified marble remains, likely connected with a large homestead. Following the fall of the Roman Empire, Gonzaga and the Po' plain were settled by a Germanic people, the Lombards.

=== Middle Ages ===
In 1215 during the course of a war between Mantua and rival cities Gonzaga was unsuccessfully besieged by troops from Reggio and Cremona. Five years later the comune of Reggio during another war against Mantua tried again to conquer Gonzaga but the arrival of a detachment of Modenese allies and their capture of the castle of Bondeno thwarted the campaign. Peace between Mantua and Reggio was agreed upon in 1225: the village of Gonzaga was assigned to Mantua, the castle and village of Bondeno to Reggio and the two towns agreed to share a common jurisdiction over the village of Pegognaga. The Corradi family, also known as the Corradi da Gonzaga - the branch from which the famous Gonzaga family, lords of Mantua from 1328 to 1707, originated was originally from Gonzaga, and eventually came to be known by the name of the town.

=== The Nineteenth Century ===
During the Nineteenth Century Gonzaga was at the heart of a widespread agrarian strike known as "Le Boje", inspired by the Mantuan radical and former red-shirt Francesco Siliprandi, one of Italy's first labor organizers and the founder of Mantua's first trade union, the Associazione Generale dei Lavoratori. In 1882 police reports suggested a committee formed in Gonzaga by locals inspired by new Socialist ideas and affiliated to Silliprandi's organization and called "Pane e Lavoro" (Bread and Work) organized a gathering of 1,000 striking wage laborers to clamor, first in the frazione of Moglia di Gonzaga, and then in the main town square for universal suffrage higher pay and a redistribution of the products of labor. Weeks of unrest in the small town followed, and the apparent appearance of fliers exhorting "Hurray for the Paris Commune, Hurray for the social Revolution, down those who do not toil, and death to the tyrants of the people!" and the sight of large groups of striking farmers singing protest marches and carrying sickles and shovels further evoked the specter of revolution. Troops eventually arrived and arrested 18 strikers, including 4 members of the local committee and Alcibiade Moneta, editor of the new socialist periodical "La Favilla" and a candidate at the political elections of the 28th of October (all arrestees were sentenced to jail-time). The strike that started in Gonzaga however spread to nearby municipalities in Bondeno, Ostiglia, Quistello, Revere, Bagnolo, Borgoforte, Sustinente and Serravalle a Po': the key demand was that no labor would be done for less than two and a half lira's day-wage, and tension lasted for weeks. The strike was repeated, even more widespread, in 1885, this time associated with the cry of "La Boje" (first used by striking farmhands in nearby Rovigo province) - "it boils" - a term later used by historians to describe the entire set of strikes that agitated the Po valley between 1883 and 1885. Activists and striking workers were arrested across the lower Mantuan area, and in nearby provinces in Modena, Reggio, Cremona and Rovigo, leading the Bishop of Mantua and MPs to despair the arrival of the new "Red Gospel" in the Lombard countryside.

=== The Twentieth Century ===
During the Second World War local partigiani operating in the Po Valley fought an all-out battle against occupying German forces and their collaborationist allies from the Italian Social Republic on the night between 19 and 20 December 1944. Gonzaga at that time housed a small German military garrison as well as a unit of the 13th Battalion of MVSN Blackshirts "Marcello Turchetti". Barracks in town also housed a Detachment of the 614th Provincial Command of the Fascist National Republican Guard, and a unit of German police and soldiers connected with a temporary transit camp where prisoners of war and men conscripted for forced labor were housed.

The town was attacked by a group of some 300 resistance fighters drawn from the 77th Squadra di Azione Patriotica Brigade "F.lli Manfredi" the 1st and 7th Gruppo di Azione Partigiana squads of the 65th "Walter Tabacchi" Brigade and the "Ciclone" squad of the 121st Garibaldi "A. Luppi" Brigade. They came from resistance groups scattered all across the lower Mantuan province, as well as from Modena and Reggio provinces. Most gathered in secret on the evening of the 19th of December at an out-of-the way rural spot south of the town, Cantonazzo.

After dark the partigiani closed up access to the seven streets leading into town and set up machine-gun positions. They then divided up into columns: local partisans attacked the National Republican Guard, the partisans from Reggio struck the Blackshirt barracks and the partisans from Modena attacked the German units at the POW camp. The battle started around the German-held POW camp after a captured SS Captain raised the alarm. In the clash 15 Germans (including an SS Captain) were killed, alongside five Republican Guard soldiers and two partisans. The clashes ended only when the resistance forces captured all targets in the village, forcing German and collaborationist troops to retreat. In the early hors of the morning the resistance fighters left the area, disappearing into the countryside before German and Fascist reinforcements could reach the town.

The German authorities retaliated by ordering the execution of seven resistance fighters rounded up earlier in December in the area of Poggio Rusco. The execution of Aldo Barbi, Iginio Bardini, Aldo Ferrari, Fortunato Ferrari, Ugo Roncada, Vasco Zucchi was carried out by the fascist militia at the shooting range in town on December 22, 1944. Another resistance fighter, Bruno Brondolin was executed in jail soon after.

== Notable residents ==
- Vincenzo de Cotiis (born 1958), artist and designer
