= Suzzara =

Suzzara Süsèra (Emilian)
- Comune
- Città di Suzzara
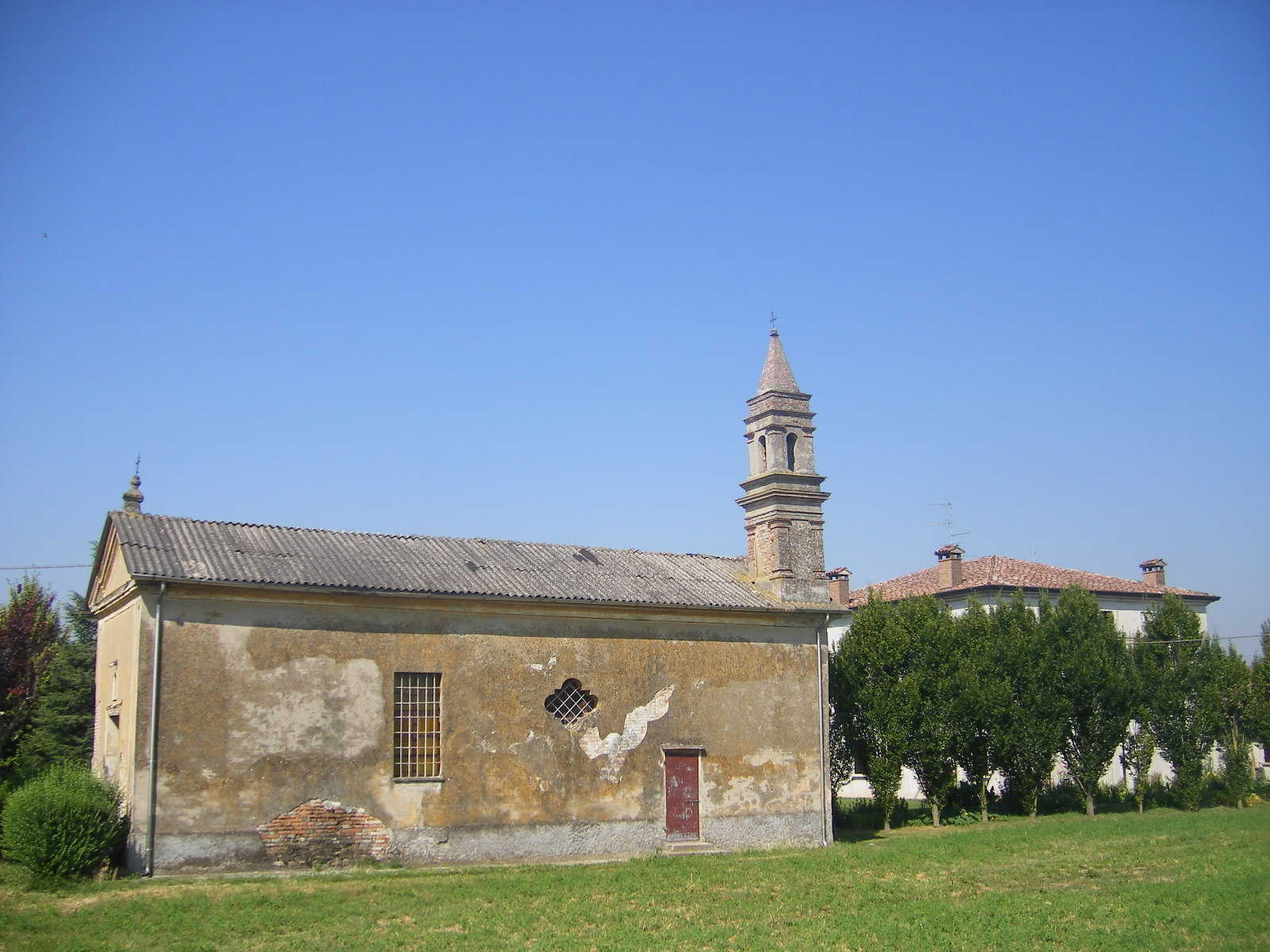
- Panorama of Suzzara

- Coat of arms

- Location within Italy Location within Lombardy
- Coordinates: 45°0′N 10°45′E
- Country: Italy
- Region: Lombardy
- Province: Mantua (MN)
- Frazioni: Brusatasso, Riva, Sailetto, San Prospero, Tabellano, Vie Nuove

Government
  - Mayor: Ivan Ongari (Partito Democratico)

Area
  - Total: 60.8 km^{2} (23.5 sq mi)
- Elevation: 20 m (66 ft)

Population (31 July 2014)
  - Total: 21,129
  - Density: 348/km^{2} (900/sq mi)
- Demonym: Suzzaresi
- Time zone: UTC+1 (CET)
  - Summer (DST): UTC+2 (CEST)
- Postal code: 46029
- Dialing code: 0376
- Patron saint: St. Blaise
- Saint day: February 3
- Website: Official website

Suzzara (Lower Mantovano: Süsèra) is a comune (municipality) in the Province of Mantua, in the Italian region of Lombardy, located about 130 kilometres (81 mi) southeast of Milan and about 20 kilometres (12 mi) south of the city of Mantua.

Suzzara was given the honorary title of a city by a royal decree dated November 9, 1923. It is home to a large IVECO/CNH plant, producing Iveco Daily vehicles.

== Geography ==
The municipality borders Dosolo, Gonzaga, Luzzara (RE), Motteggiana, Pegognaga and Viadana.

It includes six civil parishes (frazioni): Brusatasso, Riva, Sailetto, San Prospero, Tabellano, Vie Nuove.

Suzzara borders with Emilia-Romagna.

== Twin towns ==
Suzzara is twinned with:

- Brioude, France, since 1995

== See also ==
- Andrea Romitti
- Pinfari
- Suzzara Calcio
