= Pegognaga =

Pegognaga Pigugnàga (Emilian)
- Comune
- Comune di Pegognaga
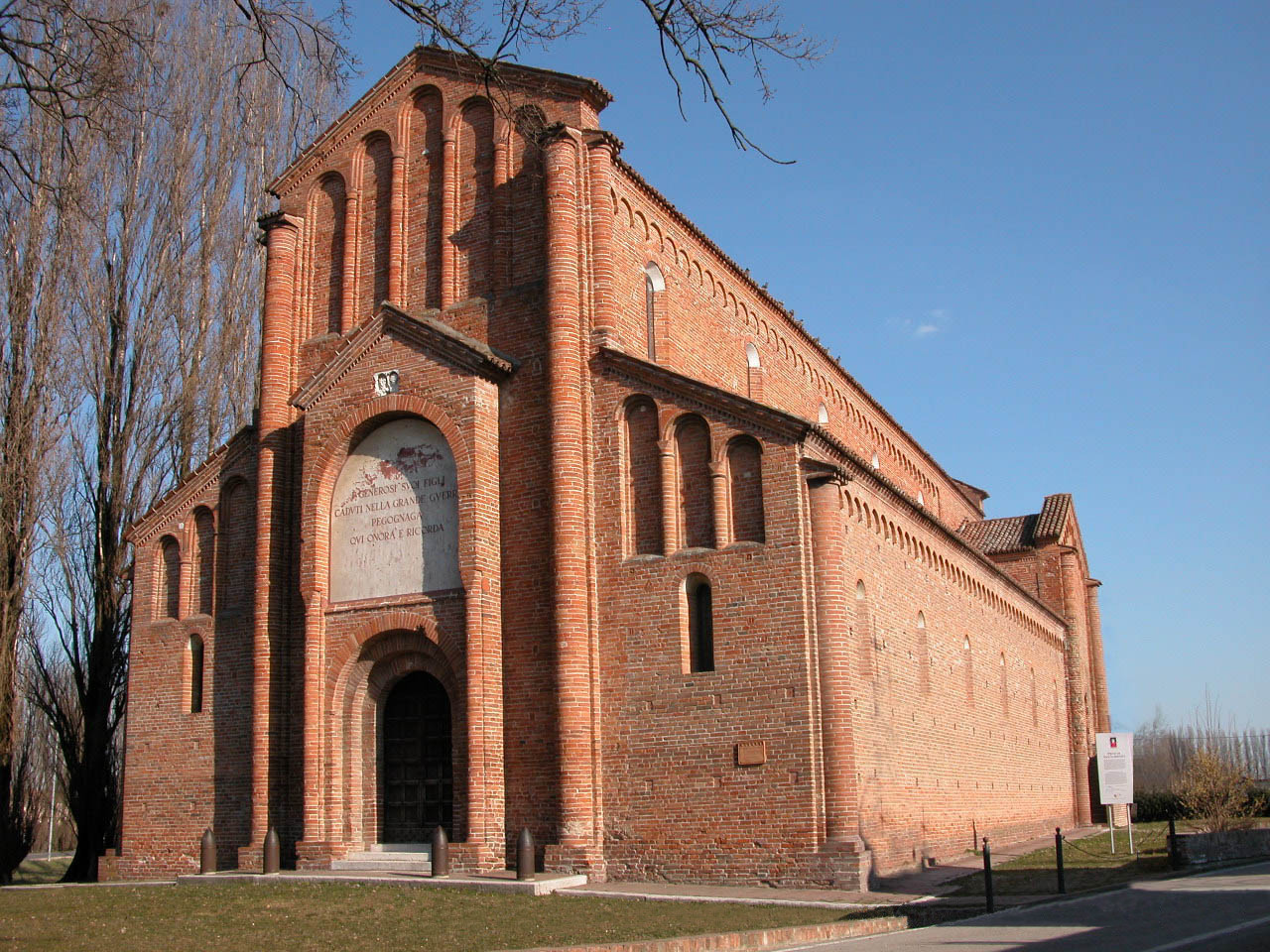
- Pieve of St. Lawrence.

- Coat of arms

- Location within Italy Location within Lombardy
- Coordinates: 45°0′N 10°51′E
- Country: Italy
- Region: Lombardy
- Province: Mantua (MN)
- Frazioni: Galvagnina, Polesine, Sacca

Government
  - Mayor: Dimitri Melli

Area
  - Total: 46.69 km^{2} (18.03 sq mi)
- Elevation: 22 m (72 ft)

Population (31 July 2014)
  - Total: 7,200
  - Density: 150/km^{2} (400/sq mi)
- Demonym: Pegognaghesi
- Time zone: UTC+1 (CET)
  - Summer (DST): UTC+2 (CEST)
- Postal code: 46020
- Dialing code: 0376
- Patron saint: St. Lawrence
- Saint day: August 10
- Website: Official website

Pegognaga (Lower Mantovano: Pigugnàga) is a comune (municipality) in the Province of Mantua in the Italian region of Lombardy, located about 140 kilometres (87 mi) southeast of Milan and about 20 kilometres (12 mi) south of Mantua.

== History ==
The name may come from the Latin Pecunius, a Roman aristocrat who, in the 1st century AD founded a little agricultural village. It also might be connected to the word pecunia, which in Latin means money, richness, referring to the lands of that place that could offer profitable harvests.
