= List of museums in Lombardy =

This is a list of museums in Lombardy, a region of Italy. Please refer to the specific lists for the

- Museums of the Province of Bergamo
- Museums of the Province of Brescia
- Museums of the Province of Como
- Museums of the Province of Cremona
- Museums of the Province of Lecco
- Museums of the Province of Lodi
- Museums of the Province of Mantua
- Museums of the Province of Milan (Museums in Milan)
- Museums of the Province of Pavia
- Museums of the Province of Sondrio
- Museums of the Province of Varese

== Museum networks in Lombardy ==
The museums of the Lombardy Region are organised in networks recognised officially by the region. There are different kind of networks: museum systems, regional networks of museums, networks of museums of the Lombardy Region for contemporary art, and the network of ecomuseums of the Lombardy Region.

=== Museum systems ===
- Province of Bergamo
  - Rete dei musei della Diocesi di Bergamo
  - Sistema culturale integrato bassa pianura bergamasca
  - Sistema museale “Triassico.it”
- Province of Brescia
  - Montichiari Musei
  - Sistema musei di Valle Camonica
  - Sistema museale della Valle Sabbia
  - Sistema museale della Valle Trompia
- Province of Como – Sistema museale territoriale Alpi Lepontine
- Province of Cremona
  - Arte, cultura, storia fra Serio e Oglio
  - Sistema museale della città di Cremona
- Province of Lecco
  - Sistema museale della Provincia di Lecco
  - Sistema Museale Urbano Lecchese (Si.M.U.L.)
- Province of Lodi – Sistema museale lodigiano
- Province of Mantua – Sistema provinciale dei musei e dei beni culturali mantovani
- Province of Pavia
  - Sistema museale d'Ateneo - Università di Pavia
  - Sistema museale locale Lomellina Musei
- Province of Sondrio – Sistema museale della Valchiavenna
- Province of Varese – SiMArch della Provincia di Varese

=== Regional networks of museums ===
- Network of historic house museum
- Museum for history
- Network of botanical gardens
- Network of archaeological museums of the provinces of Brescia, Cremona, and Mantua
- Network of museums and ethnographical collections in Lombardy
- Network of the 19th century in Lombardy
- Network of Early Middle Ages

== See also ==
- List of museums in Province of Como
- List of museums in Province of Lecco
- List of museums in Province of Sondrio
- List of museums in Province of Varese
- List of museums in Italy
