= List of museums in Province of Sondrio =

This is a list of museums in the Province of Sondrio, Lombardy Region, Italy.

== Museums and ecomuseums ==
Name	Image	Location	City	Province	Network	Area of study	Summary
Mu.Vi.S. Museo della Via Spluga & della Val San Giacomo			Campodolcino	Sondrio	Sistema museale della Valchiavenna, collection recognized.		
Museo del Tesoro e Battistero			Chiavenna	Sondrio	Sistema museale della Valchiavenna, collection recognized.		
Museo della Valchiavenna			Chiavenna, Piuro	Sondrio	Sistema museale della Valchiavenna, collection recognized.		Museum has several locations: Cà Bardassa, Mulino di Bottonera, Parco botanico archeologico del Paradiso, Palazzo Pestalozzi-Luna, Palazzo Pretorio, archeological session and naturalistic session. The Palazzo Vertemate-Franchi in Piuro is part of the Museo della Valchiavenna.
Museo dello Scalpellino			Novate Mezzola	Sondrio	Sistema museale della Valchiavenna		
Museo Scavi di Piuro			Piuro	Sondrio	Sistema museale della Valchiavenna		
Museo di Samolaco			Samolaco	Sondrio	Sistema museale della Valchiavenna		
Giardino Botanico Alpino "Rezia"			Bormio	Sondrio	Network of botanical gardens	Botanical garden	
Museo Civico di Bormio			Bormio	Sondrio			
Museo Mineralogico Naturalistico			Bormio	Sondrio			
Museo storico etnografico naturalistico			Chiesa in Valmalenco	Sondrio		Ethnographic	
Museo dell'Homo salvadego			Cosio Valtellino	Sondrio		Ethnographic	
Museo Etnografico di Sostila e della Val Fabiolo			Forcola	Sondrio		Ethnographic	
Museo Civico Visconti Venosta			Grosio	Sondrio			
Parco incisioni rupestri Museo di Ca' del Cap			Grosio	Sondrio			
Museo Civico di Storia Naturale			Morbegno	Sondrio	Collection recognized.		
Museo dei Picapreda			Novate Mezzola	Sondrio			
Museo Storico Etnografico e Naturalistico della Val Codera			Novate Mezzola	Sondrio	Collection recognized.		
Museo di Piuro			Piuro	Sondrio			
Museo etnografico della Civiltà contadina			Ponte in Valtellina	Sondrio		Ethnography	
Museo Parrocchiale "San Maurizio"			Ponte in Valtellina	Sondrio		Art	
Museo Valtellinese di Storia e Arte			Sondrio	Sondrio	Museum recognized		
Museo Etnografico			Teglio	Sondrio		Ethnography	
Museo Etnografico Tiranese			Tirano	Sondrio		Ethnography	
Museo Senza Frontiere tra Grigioni e Valtellina			Tirano	Sondrio			
Palazzo Salis			Tirano	Sondrio		Historic house	
Museo della Val Masino			Val Masino	Sondrio			
Museo Vallivo della Valfurva			Valfurva	Sondrio			
Ecomuseo Valli del Bitto di Albaredo			Albaredo	Sondrio	Recognized ecomuseum by the Lombardy Region	Ecomuseum	
Ecomuseo della Valgerola			Valgerola	Sondrio	Recognized ecomuseum by the Lombardy Region	Ecomuseum	
Ecomuseo della Valmalenco			Valmalenco	Sondrio	Recognized ecomuseum by the Lombardy Region	Ecomuseum	
Ecomuseo delle Terrazze Retiche di Bianzone			Bianzone	Sondrio	Recognized ecomuseum by the Lombardy Region	Ecomuseum	
