= Robert Savoie (artist) =

- Born: 1939; Quebec City
- Education: Institut des arts graphique du Quebec (1957-1960): École des beaux-arts de Montréal (1960-1962); Chelsea School of Art(1962); Atelier 17 (1963-1964)
- Known for: Colour engraving, kinetic art, drawing, sculpture
- Style: Abstract

Signature
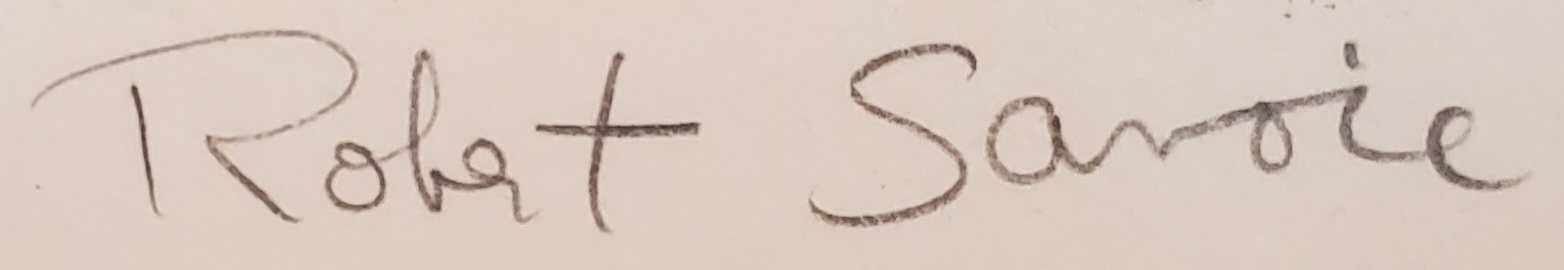

Robert Savoie (born 1939) is a Canadian artist based in Montreal. His work, which ranges from colour engraving to kinetic art and drawing, is held in the Musée d'art contemporain de Montréal, the National Gallery of Canada, the Buffalo AKG Art Museum, the Musée national des beaux-arts du Québec and the Écomusée du fier monde.

From 1957 to 1959 he was a student at the Institut des arts graphique du Quebec, where he studied engraving with Albert Dumouchel. From 1960 to 1962 he attended the École des beaux-arts de Montréal and in 1962 he studied theatre design at the Chelsea School of Art. From 1963 to 1964 a Canada Council grant allowed him to work with Stanley William Hayter at Atelier 17 in Paris, where he learned the new technique of viscosity printing. This technique made possible colour engraving, which became Savoie's specialty.

Savoie was a member of the New International Gravure Group, a group of artists from various countries who were associated with Atelier 17. His work was represented in their group shows in Norway, Argentina, Venezuela, Sweden, Belgium, Italy, Canada and the United States between 1964 and 1966. He visited and studied in Japan and Scandinavia before returning to Canada, where he taught at the École des beaux-arts de Montréal between 1968 and 1970.

Savoie began working in serigraphy and kinetic art in the late 1960s and exhibited works in these media at the Musée national des beaux-arts du Québec in 1970. Later in the 1970s he turned to drawing and painting with Japanese ink.

In 1987 Savoie created Kawari Kabuto, a large mural work in corten steel for the Montreal Metro's Square-Victoria–OACI station.
