= Venusti =

Venusti is a surname. Notable people with the surname include:

- Marcello Venusti (1512–1579), Italian painter
- Raffaele Venusti (died 1543), Italian Catholic apologist
