= Rates Ecomuseum =

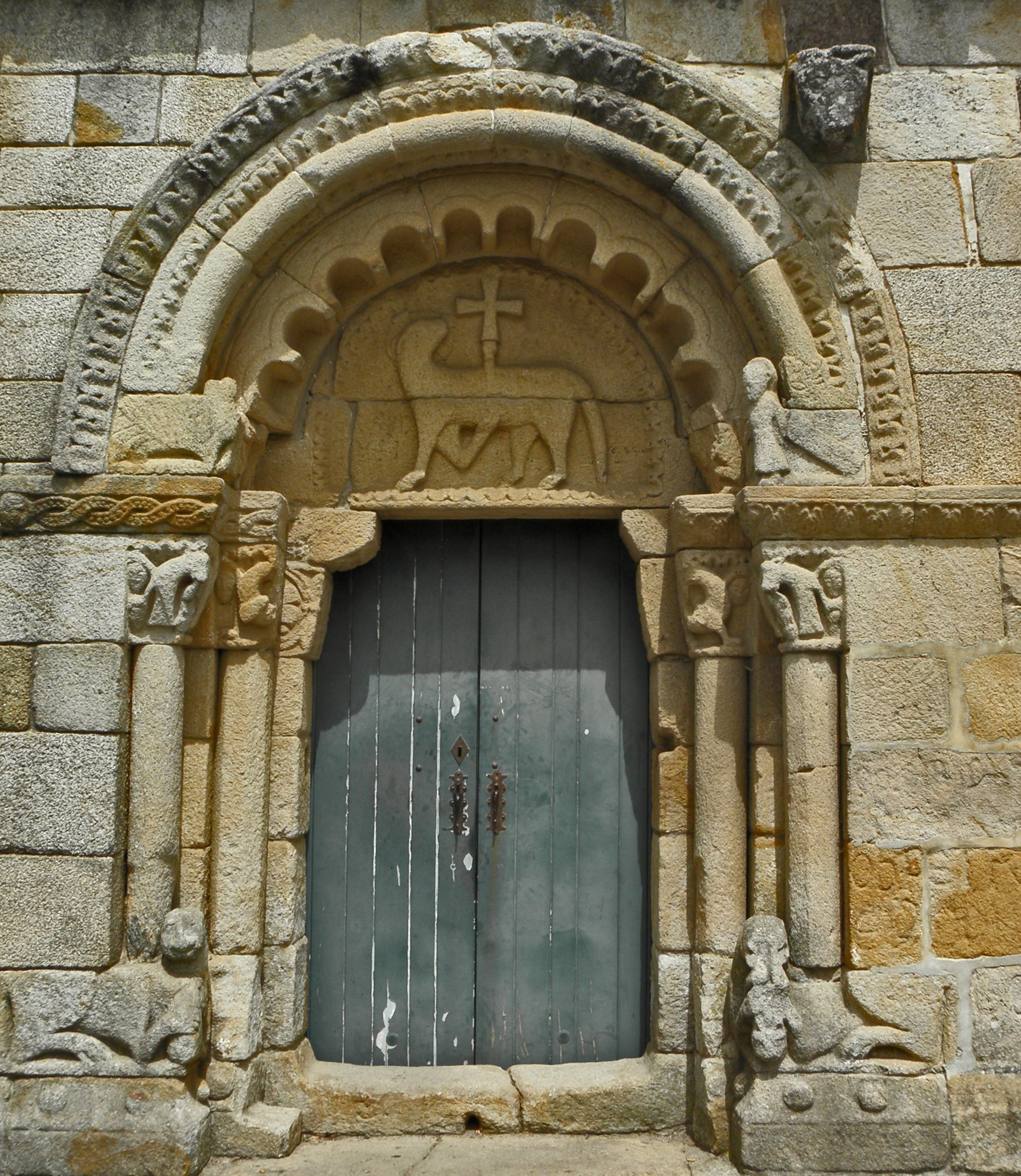
Anthropomorphic and zoomorphic portal in the Romanesque Church of Rates.

Rates Ecomuseum (Portuguese: Ecomuseu de Rates or Ecomuseu de São Pedro de Rates) is a historic countryside pedestrian circuit or ecomuseum in the parish of Rates in Póvoa de Varzim, Portugal.

Highlights of the 8 km-long circuit are the Romanesque Church of Rates, the bell-tower of the former monastery, the Praça, the rural architecture using shale as a construction material, the local section of the way of Saint James, the countryside landscape, windmills, watermills and the linen, bread and wine-making cultures.

The ecomuseum includes maps and plates with information in Portuguese and English.

== History ==
The ecomuseum opened on April 21, 2007. Works started on eight stops (estações), for the first phase. Two more stops: Casa do Trabalhador Rural and Parque Ambiental were postponed for later development.

The project was financed by the City Hall of Póvoa de Varzim with the support of the national government's Agris program on rural development, officially known as Programa Operacional Regional - Medida Agricultura e Desenvolvimento Rural.

== Main sights ==
- Romanesque Church of Rates - National monument. One of the most important, best-preserved and ancient Romanesque temples in Portugal (6th-13th century). This stop also includes the Church's museum.
- Fonte de São Pedro de Rates - Fountain figuring in myths about the Christianization of the region (1st-9th century).
- Santo António - 18th century Baroque Chapel of Santo António and Casa do Lavrador (Farmer's House).
- Ancient Fountain and Lavadouro - used for drinking and washing area, respectively.
- Praça - historical square, civic center in the early Middle Ages.
- Windmill and Park near the Escola Agrícola (Farmer school)
- Fonte do Pedro, a fountain
- Fonte da Granja, a fountain
- Azenha do Pego, a watermill
General details

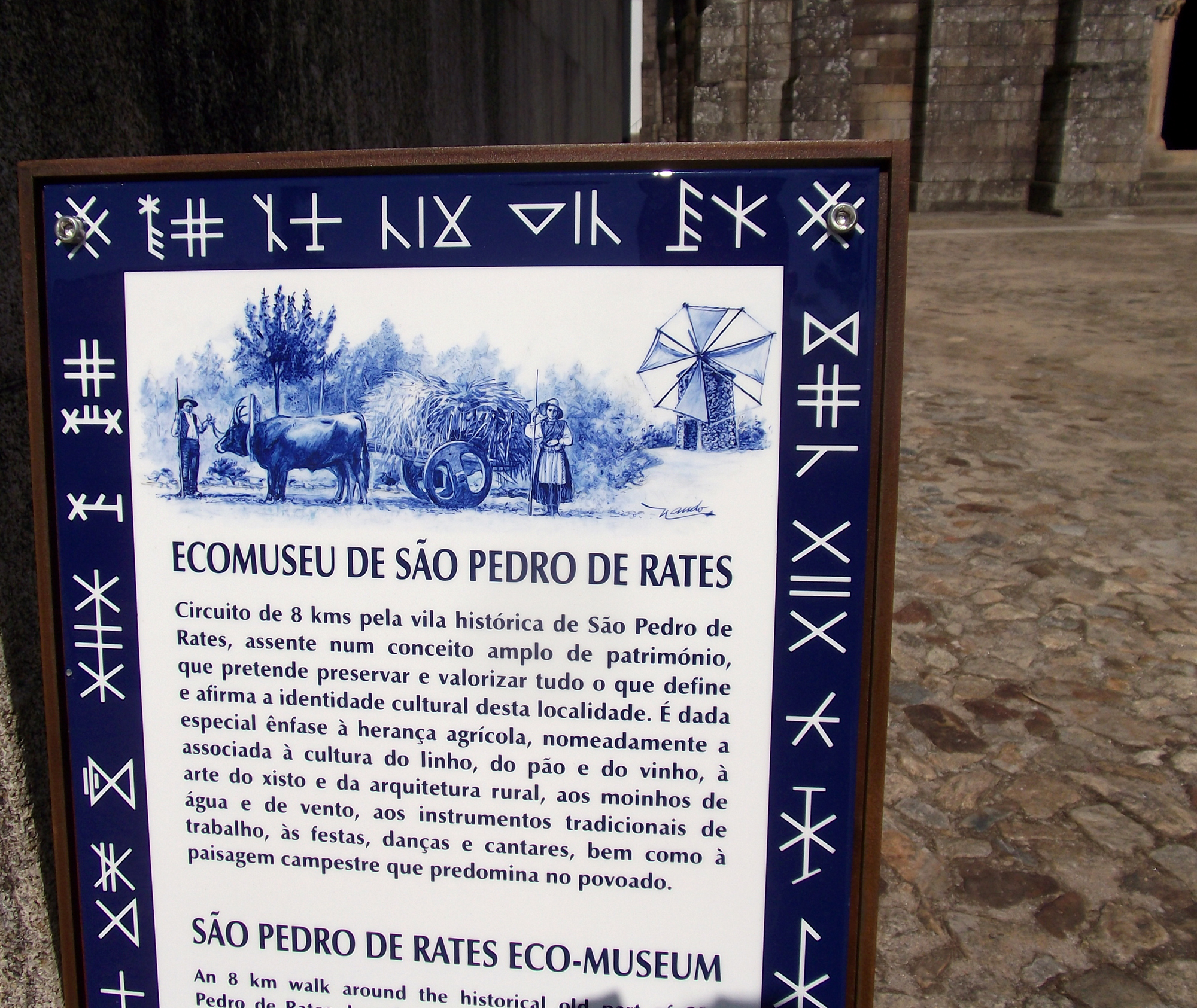
An information plate along the route

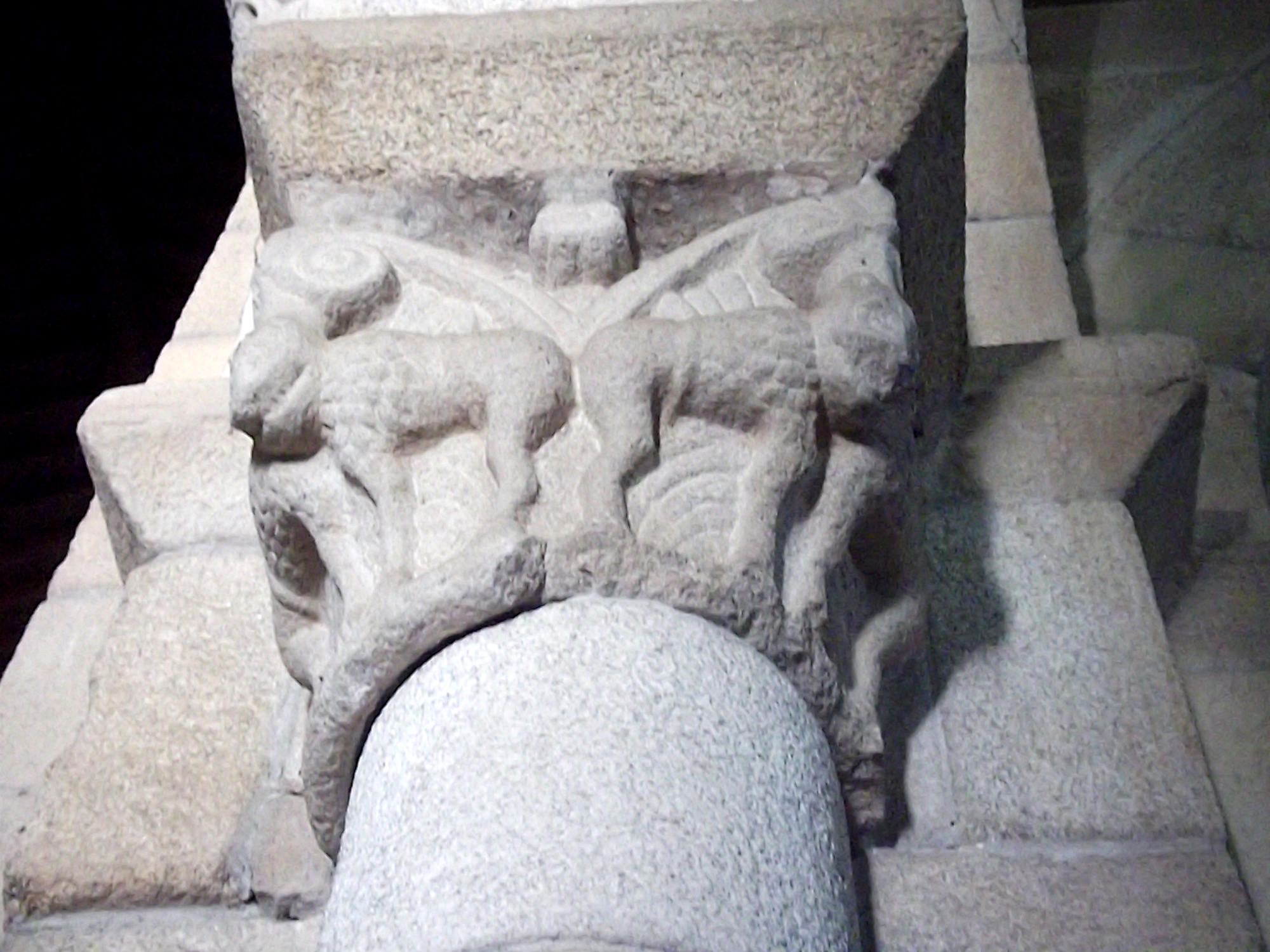
Capital with beasts in the Romanesque church.

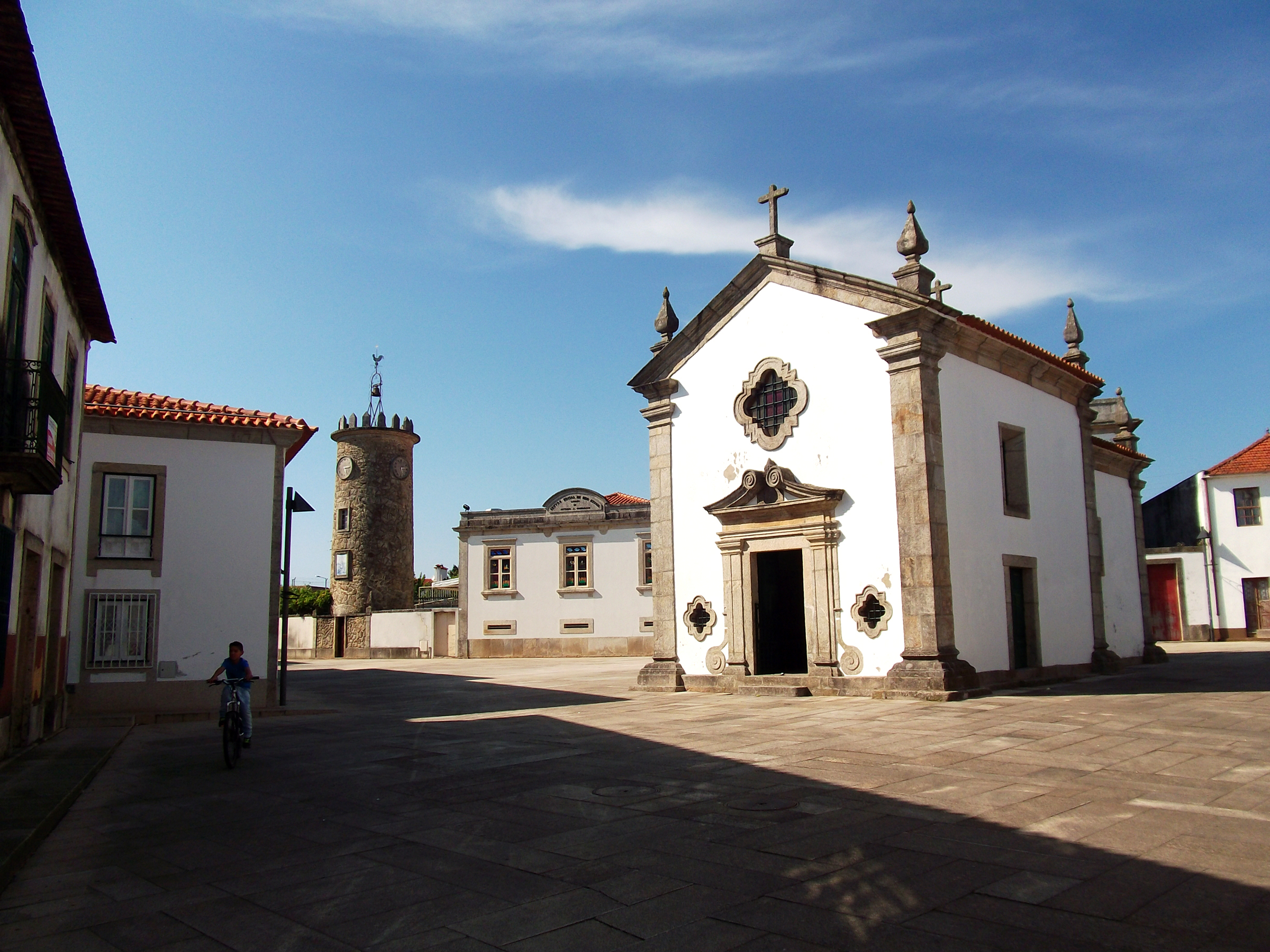
The main square

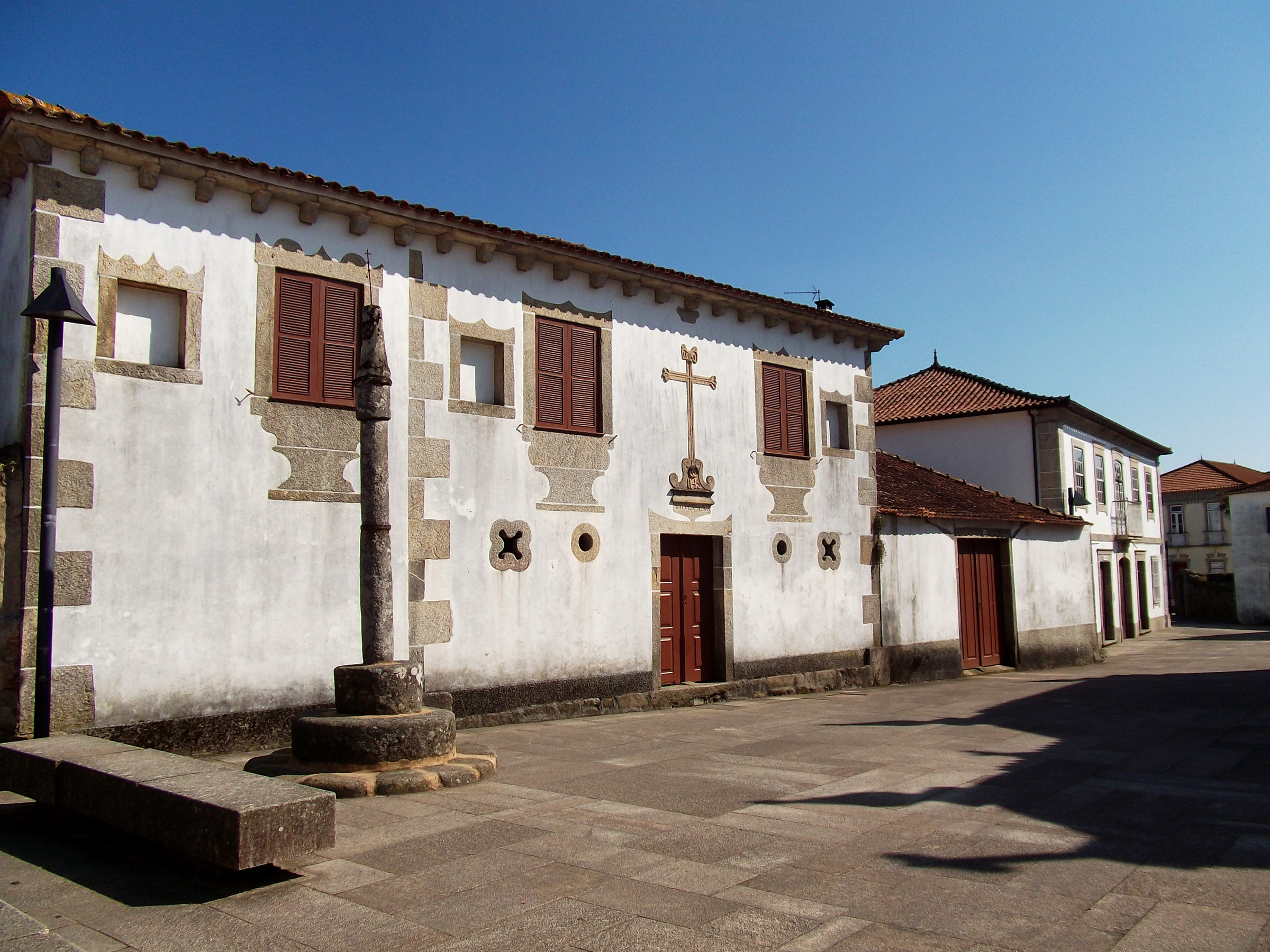
Former town hall and pillory
