= List of museums in Province of Milan =

This is a list of museums in the Province of Milan, Lombardy Region, Italy.

== Museums and ecomuseums ==
Name	Image	Location	City	Network	Area of study	Summary
Orto Botanico di Brera			Milan	Network of botanical gardens	Botanical garden	
Orto Botanico Didattico e Sperimentale "Cascina Rosa"			Milan	Network of botanical gardens	Botanical garden	
Orto Botanico Didattico Sperimentale dell'Università di Milano			Milan		Botanical garden	
Museo boschi Di Stefano			Milan	Network of historic house museum	Historic house museum	
Villa Necchi Campiglio			Milan	Network of historic house museum	Historic house museum	
Museo Bagatti Valsecchi			Milan	Network of historic house museum	Historic house museum	
Museo Poldi Pezzoli			Milan	Network of historic house museum	Historic house museum	
Convento Santa Maria delle Grazie (The Last Supper)			Milan		Art	
Gallerie di Piazza Scala			Milan		Art	
Milan Cathedral Museum			Milan		Art	
Modern Art Gallery			Milan		Art	
Museo del Novecento			Milan		Art	
Museo d'Arte Paolo Pini (MAPP)			Milan		Art	
Museo Diocesano			Milan		Art	
Museo della Permanente			Milan		Art	
Museo di Sant'Eustorgio			Milan		Art	
Museo Villa Clerici			Milan		Art	
Padiglione d'Arte Contemporanea (PAC)			Milan		Art	
Pinacoteca Ambrosiana			Milan		Art	
Pinacoteca di Brera			Milan		Art	
Royal Palace of Milan			Milan		Art	
Triennale Museum			Milan		Art and design	
Archaeological Museum			Milan		History	
Museum del Risorgimento			Milan		History	
Civic Aquarium of Milan			Milan		Natural history	
Natural History Museum of Milan			Milan		Natural history	
Museo Nazionale Scienza e Tecnologia Leonardo da Vinci			Milan		Science	
Planetarium of Milan			Milan		Science	
Achille Bertarelli Prints Collection			Milan	Raccolte civiche Castello Sforzesco Sforza Castle	Art	The Milan collection of old prints.
Antique Furniture & Wooden Sculpture Museum			Milan	Raccolte civiche Castello Sforzesco Sforza Castle		
Applied Arts Collection			Milan	Raccolte civiche Castello Sforzesco Sforza Castle		
Egyptian Museum			Milan	Raccolte civiche Castello Sforzesco Sforza Castle		
Museum of Musical Instruments			Milan	Raccolte civiche Castello Sforzesco Sforza Castle		
The Museum of Ancient Art			Milan	Raccolte civiche Castello Sforzesco Sforza Castle		
The Prehistoric collections of the Archaeological Museum of Milan.			Milan	Raccolte civiche Castello Sforzesco Sforza Castle		
Sforza Castle Pinacoteca			Milan	Raccolte civiche Castello Sforzesco Sforza Castle	Art	
Museo storico Alfa Romeo			Arese			
Monumental Cemetery of Milan			Milan		Art	
Museo Teatrale alla Scala			Milan			
San Siro Museum (AC Milan and FC Internazionale Museum)			Milan			
Museo Miscellaneo Galbiati			Brugherio			
Museo Civico dei Mestieri e della Memoria			Casorezzo		Ethnography	
Museo Storico			Castano Primo		History	
Museo Civico di Cernusco sul Naviglio			Cernusco sul Naviglio			
Museo di fotografia contemporanea			Cinisello Balsamo	Museum recognized		
Collezione Privata "Carlo Alberto Pisani Dossi"			Corbetta			
Museo del legno Luigi Magugliani			Corbetta			
Museo delle Comunicazioni			Cormano			
Museo Storico Civico Cuggionese			Cuggiono			
Mostra permanente della vita contadina e delle fornaci			Garbagnate Milanese		Ethnography	
Museo Civico il Ninfeo di Lainate			Lainate	Collection recognized		
Museo civico Guido Sutermeister			Legnano	Collection recognized		
Museo Civico "Don Cesare Amelli"			Melegnano			
Fondazione Emilio Carlo Mangini - Museo Mangini Bonomi			Milan	Collection recognized		
Galleria d'Arte Sacra dei Contemporanei			Milan	Collection recognized		
Museo della Basilica di Santa Maria della Passione			Milan			
Museo dei Beni Culturali Cappuccini			Milan	Museum recognized		
Museo Louis Braille			Milan	Collection recognized		
Museo del Cinema			Milan			
Museo della Fondazione Arnaldo Pomodoro			Milan			
Museo della Fondazione Luciano Minguzzi			Milan			
Civico museo-studio Francesco Messina			Milan	Museum recognized		
Palazzo Morando - Museo del Costume Moda e Immagine			Milan	Museum recognized		
Museo Martinitt e Stelline			Milan	Museum recognized		
Museo Nazionale Casa del Manzoni			Milan			
Museo Regionale della Psichiatria			Milan	Collection recognized		
Museo Popoli e Culture			Milan	Museum recognized		
Museo Sezione Mineralogia Dipartimento Scienze della Terra			Milan			
Quadreria dei Benefattori dell'Ospedale Maggiore di Milano			Milan			
Grande Museo del Duomo di Milano			Milan			
Zucchi Collection Museum			Milan			
Museo dell'Abbazia di Morimondo			Morimondo	Museum recognized		
Museo Civico "Angelo Comolli"			Morimondo			
Museo Kartell			Noviglio			
Museo Storico del Combattente			Paderno Dugnano			
Museo Archeologico Storico Culturale Carla Musazzi			Parabiago			
Museo Zucchi Collection			Rescaldina			
Museo Rolf Schalling Le pentole nella Storia			Rozzano			
Museo della Villa San Carlo Borromeo			Senago			
Ecomuseo Adda di Leonardo			Vaprio d'Adda	Ecomuseum recognized by the Lombardy Region	Ecomuseum	
Ecomuseo Urbano Metropolitano di Milano Nord (EUMM)			Milan	Ecomuseum recognized by the Lombardy Region	Ecomuseum	
Ecomuseo del paesaggio di Parabiago			Parabiago	Ecomuseum recognized by the Lombardy Region	Ecomuseum	
