= Écomusée du fier monde =

Museum about the working-class in Canada

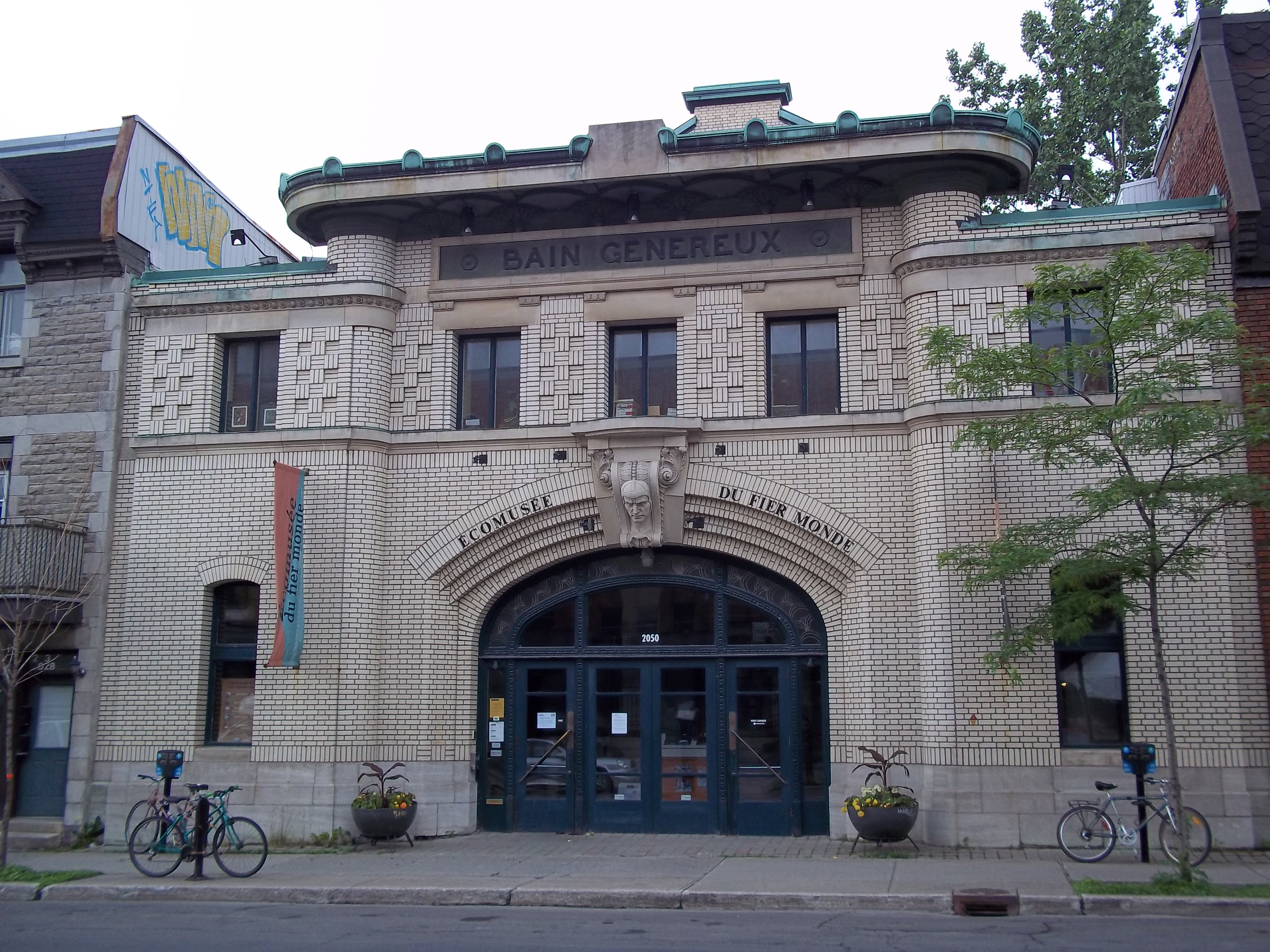
- Established: 1982
- Location: Ville-Marie, Montreal, Canada
- Coordinates: 45.520330°N 73.563668°W
- Director: Éric Giroux
- Website: https://ecomusee.qc.ca/en/

The Écomusée du fier monde is a history and community ecomuseum about the industrial and working-class people of Centre-Sud, Montreal, Canada. The name translates to "Ecomuseum of the Proud People".

== Origin and philosophy ==
In the early 1980s, the former working-class Centre-Sud neighbourhood, one of the city's oldest, was marked by deindustrialisation and major urban modernization projects. In response to these upheavals and the disappearance of heritage elements, a museum committee was formed by local community members in 1980 to engage the community around the history, culture and heritage of the area. In 1982, the organisation was established as a legal entity. The idea for creating an ecomuseum in an urban setting came from Pierre Mayrand, a Université du Québec à Montréal art history professor who pioneered modern museology.

As an ecomuseum, the Écomusée du fier monde aims to foster a close link between the museum and its social as well as physical environment, by highlighting themes related to labour and civic engagement in Montreal, in both their historical and current contexts.

== Collection ==
The museums first permanent exhibition titled "Journey through the Centre-Sud" was inaugurated in 1987, aimed at showcasing the history and culture of the neighbourhood. Since 2011, the museum follows an ecomuseum collection policy, collecting heritage elements from the Centre-Sud neighbourhood that are recognized for their symbolic and representative value. The museum has covered a breadth of topics in its temporary exhibitions, such as homelessness, bread and bakeries and the 1973 Chilean coup d'état and its legacy in Quebec.

== Location ==
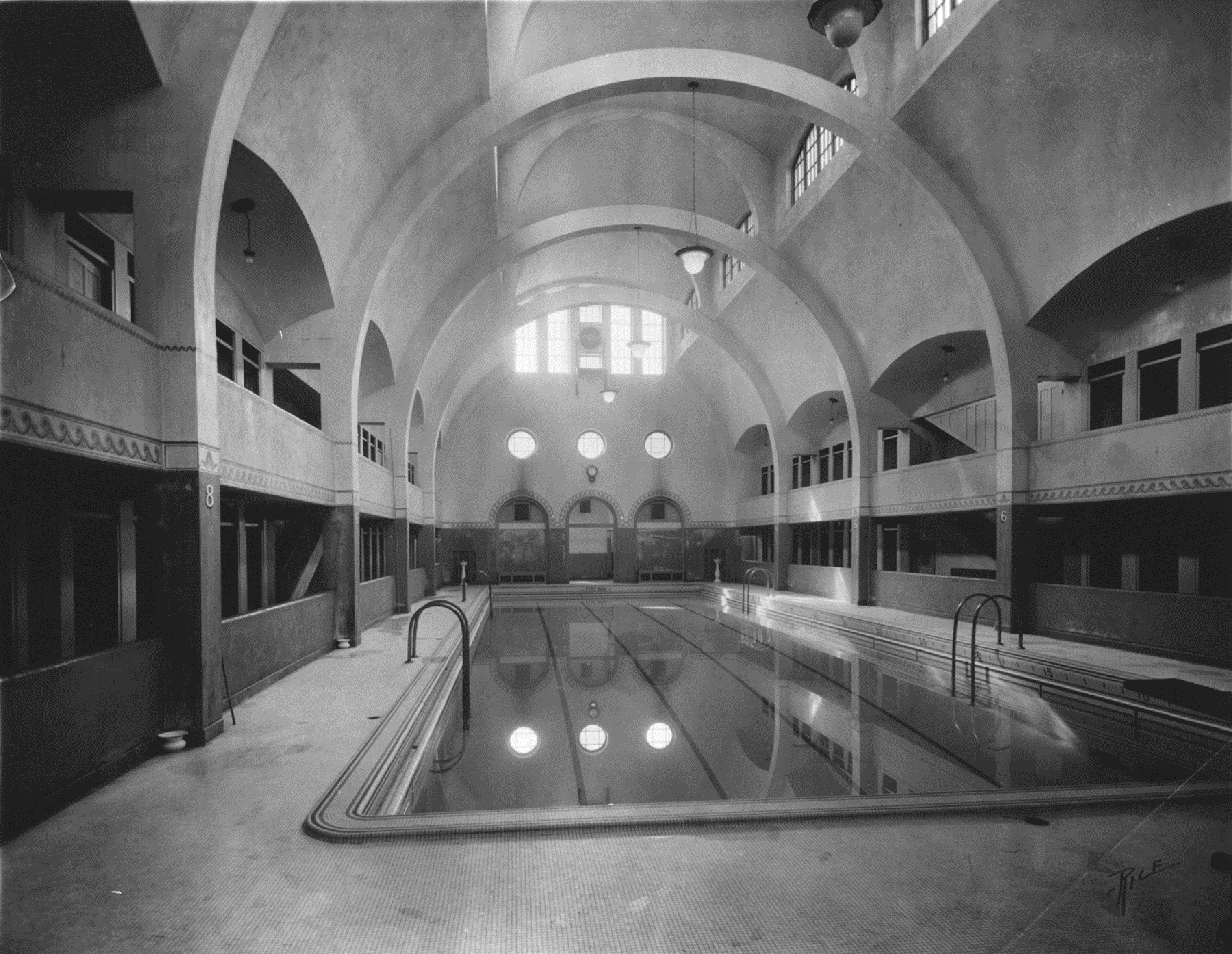
The Généreux Bath, 1928

The museum is located at 2050 Atateken Street in the Ville-Marie borough.

Since 1996, the museum is located in the Généreux Bath, an art deco former indoor public bath, modeled after the Parisian Piscine de la Butte-aux-Cailles and built in the 1920s.

== Ordre du fier monde ==
Since 2007, the museum annually awards the Ordre du fier monde (English: the Order of the Proud World) to individuals or organisation that have contributed to the development of the museum. Notable laureates include Francine Saillant and the UQAM Faculty of Arts.
