= List of museums in Province of Lecco =

This is a list of museums in the Province of Lecco, Lombardy Region, Italy.

== Museums and ecomuseums ==
Name	Image	City	Network	Area of study
Museo Etnografico dell’Alta Brianza (MEAB)		Camporeso di Galbiate	Sistema museale della Provincia di Lecco, museum recognized	Ethnography
Museo Archeologico del Monte Barro (MAB)		Galbiate	Sistema museale della Provincia di Lecco, collection recognized	Archeology
Museo delle Grigne		Esino Lario	Sistema museale della Provincia di Lecco	Geology, archeology, ethnography
Casa Museo Villa Monastero		Varenna	Sistema museale della Provincia di Lecco, collection recognized.	
Civico Museo Setificio Monti		Abbadia Lariana	Sistema museale della Provincia di Lecco	
Museo Parrocchiale S. Lorenzo Don Carlo Villa		Calolziocorte (Rossino)	Sistema museale della Provincia di Lecco, collection recognized.	
Ca' Martì. Il museo e la Valle dei Muratori		Carenno	Sistema museale della Provincia di Lecco	
Forte di Montecchio		Colico	Sistema museale della Provincia di Lecco	
Museo della Cultura Contadina		Colico	Sistema museale della Provincia di Lecco	
Museo Civico di Storia Naturale Don M. Ambrosioni e Planetario		Merate	Sistema museale della Provincia di Lecco	
Museo Etnografico di Premana		Premana	Sistema museale della Provincia di Lecco	
Muu - Museo del Latte e della Storia della Muggiasca		Vendrogno	Sistema museale della Provincia di Lecco	
Civico Museo Manzoniano		Lecco	Sistema Museale Urbano Lecchese (Si.M.U.L.), museum recognized.	
Galleria Comunale d’Arte		Lecco	Sistema Museale Urbano Lecchese (Si.M.U.L.), museum recognized.	Art
Civico Museo Archeologico		Lecco	Sistema Museale Urbano Lecchese (Si.M.U.L.), museum recognized.	Archeology
Civico Museo di Storia Naturale		Lecco	Sistema Museale Urbano Lecchese (Si.M.U.L.), museum recognized.	Natural history
Civico Museo Storico		Lecco	Sistema Museale Urbano Lecchese (Si.M.U.L.)	History and archive
Museo della Seta "Abegg"		Garlate		
Museo Medardo Rosso		Barzio		
Museo della Fornace		Barzio		Ethnographic, industrial history
Museo Ornitologico "L. Scannegatta"		Varenna		
Museo del Motociclo Moto Guzzi		Mandello del Lario		
Raccolta etnografica		Primaluna	Ethnography	
Ecomuseo delle Grigne		Esino Lario	Network of the ecomuseum of the Lombardy Region / Sistema museale della Provincia di Lecco	Ecomuseum: The relationship between man and the mountain.
Ecomuseo Val San Martino		Lecco and Bergamo	Network of the ecomuseum of the Lombardy Region	Ecomuseum
Ecomuseo della Valvarrone		Vestreno and Valvarrone	Network of the ecomuseum of the Lombardy Region	Ecomuseum
Museo Don Carlo Villa	Rossino di Calolziocorte	Lecco	Rete dei musei della Diocesi di Bergamo	
Museo del vino e della civiltà contadina in Brianza		Montevecchia		
Museo del Presepe - Santuario Beata Vergine di Loreto		Osnago		
Giardino Botanico "Gaspare De Ponti"		Calolziocorte		Botanical garden
Raccolta dell'Associazione Storico-Culturale S. Agostino		Cassago Brianza		
