= Palazzo Salis =

Museo PalazzoSalis.Tirano
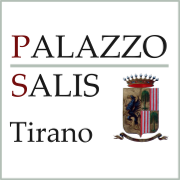
- Established: 2007
- Location: Piazza Salis 3, Tirano, Italy
- Website: www.palazzosalis.com

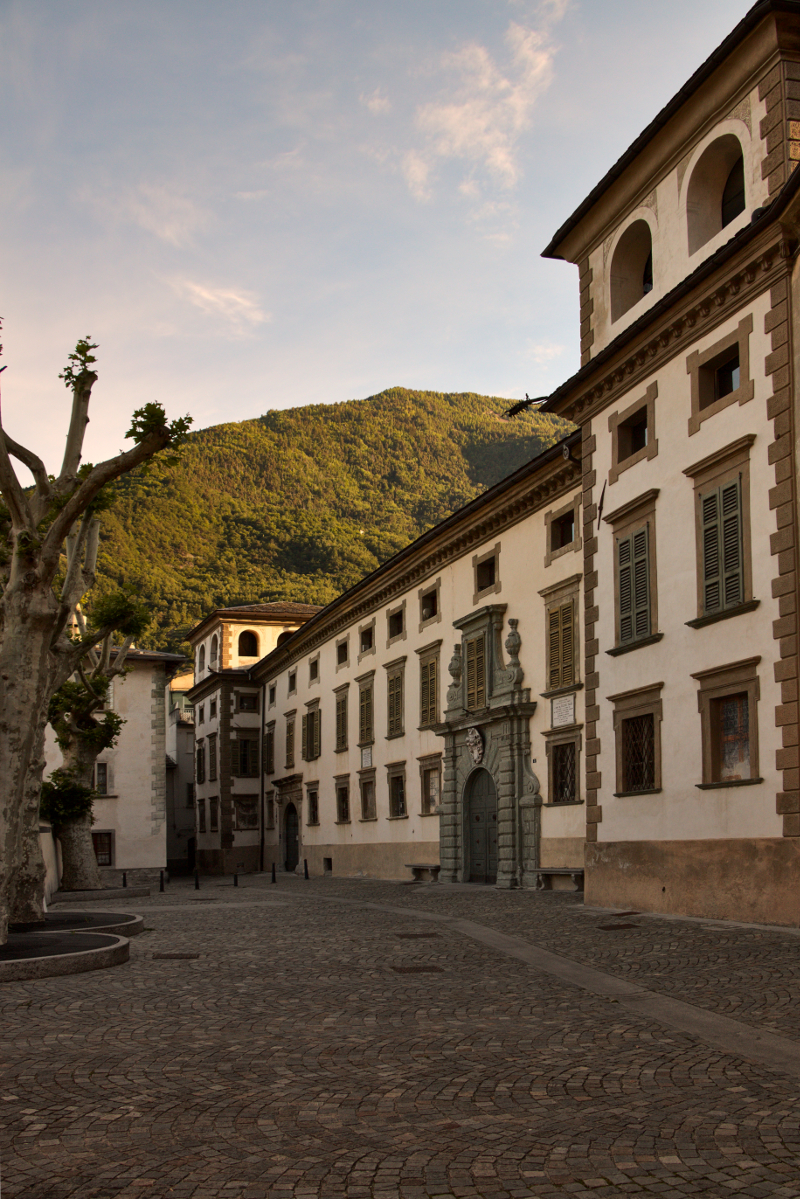
Main Facade of Palazzo Salis

The Palazzo Salis is situated in the heart of the historic centre of Tirano, a small town in the valley Valtellina in the north of Italy. The building got constructed during the second half of the 17th century by the noble family von Salis-Zizers, a branch of the important and well known grison family von Salis.

The Palazzo is still in the hands of the family Salis and is run today as a Museum. More than ten rooms decorated with frescoes and stucco from the 17th and 18th century, as well as the hidden Italian Garden on the backside of the building are opened for the public.

== Tirano - Valtellina ==
The geographical location of Tirano, or rather of its historic centre, is a very strategical point for transport and trading in the Valtellina valley. It is the crossing point of the natural east–west latitude of the valley on the one hand, and an important north–south passage over the southern Alps on the other hand. Exactly those last mountain passes before entering the lowlands of northern Italy have been highly important for trade and political interests, especially in mediaeval and early modern period.

In that period in the hands of the Duchy of Milan, who even tried to fortify the valley (e.g. castle and city wall of Tirano), the Free State of the Three Leagues conquered the Valtellina in the year 1512, and kept it, with an interruption during the Thirty Years' War, until 1797 as a subordinated territory. For ruling and administrating the new territory the Grisons sent governors and podestà into the cities of the Valtellina, elected mainly out of the noble grison families.

== Family-Name von Salis and Salis-Zizers ==
The family name von Salis derives from Latin word (salix) for the willow tree. Therefore, the coat of arms of the Salis shows an uprooted willow tree on golden ground. The origins of the family can be located in the near of the Lake Como (Sala Comacina). Most probably as a consequence of the conflict between the expanding commune Milan and the commune Como during the 12th century many noble families went north of Lake Como. Even the family Salis transferred themselves to the Val Bregaglia and resettled in the village Soglio which had a prosper position for trading. First one out of the family clan named in a document there was Rudolf Salis who died in Soglio in about 1300.

Due to their position in Soglio and their contacts to the Bishop of Chur they could increase their political and economic importance first in the Val Bregaglia, and later even in the League of God's House. After the formation of the Three Leagues they spread during the 15th and especially 16th century even into the Grey League and the League of the Ten Jurisdictions. The branch of the Salis-Zizers lead around the year 1550 to Malans, 1614 they went on to Zizers, and finally after 1637 they arrived even in Tirano.

Members of the family Salis captured during the reign of the Three Leagues especially during the 17th and 18th century the major part of the political positions in the Valtellina.

== Palazzo – Building History ==
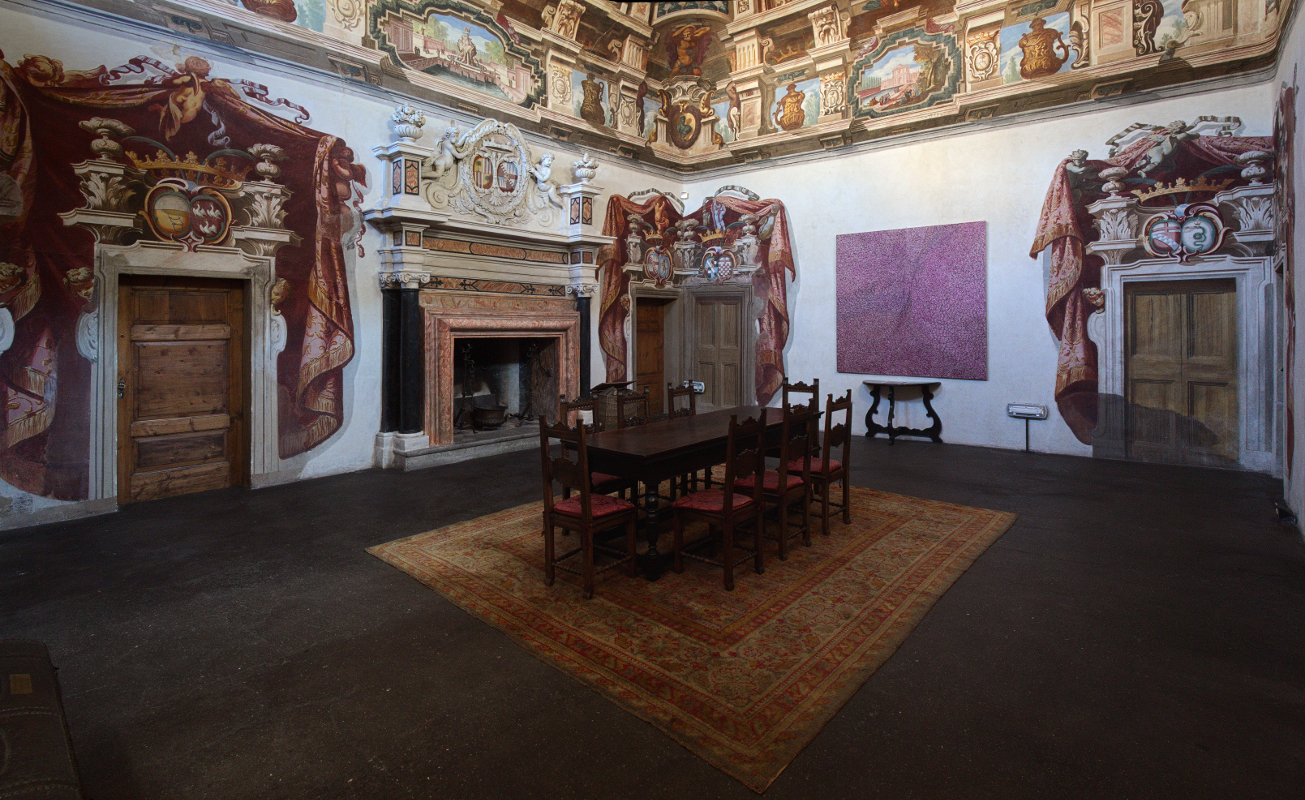
Saloncello

The Palazzo Salis is situated in the north-eastern area of Tirano, historically called Capo di Terra, inside of the town wall, that got erected in the 1490s by Ludovico Sforza, Duke of Milan. The start of the construction is dedicated to Giovanni Salis-Zizers, who even became in the 1660s twice podestà of Tirano. About in the middle of the 17th century he bought and sold different properties to finally have the land to build his Palazzo. The entire structure of the Palazzo Salis is the result of the integration and change of already well established buildings, most probably already from the 15th or 16th century. The general style of the face of the building is a leftover of the facades of those 16th century buildings. The imposing doorway of the main entrance took its inspiration from a 16th-century design of the well-known architect Giacomo Barozzi da Vignola (simply called: Il Vignola). The ground plan of the building is structured and organised mainly around two courtyards, named corte della meridiana (Sun-dial Courtyard) and corte dei cavalli (Courtyard of Horses).

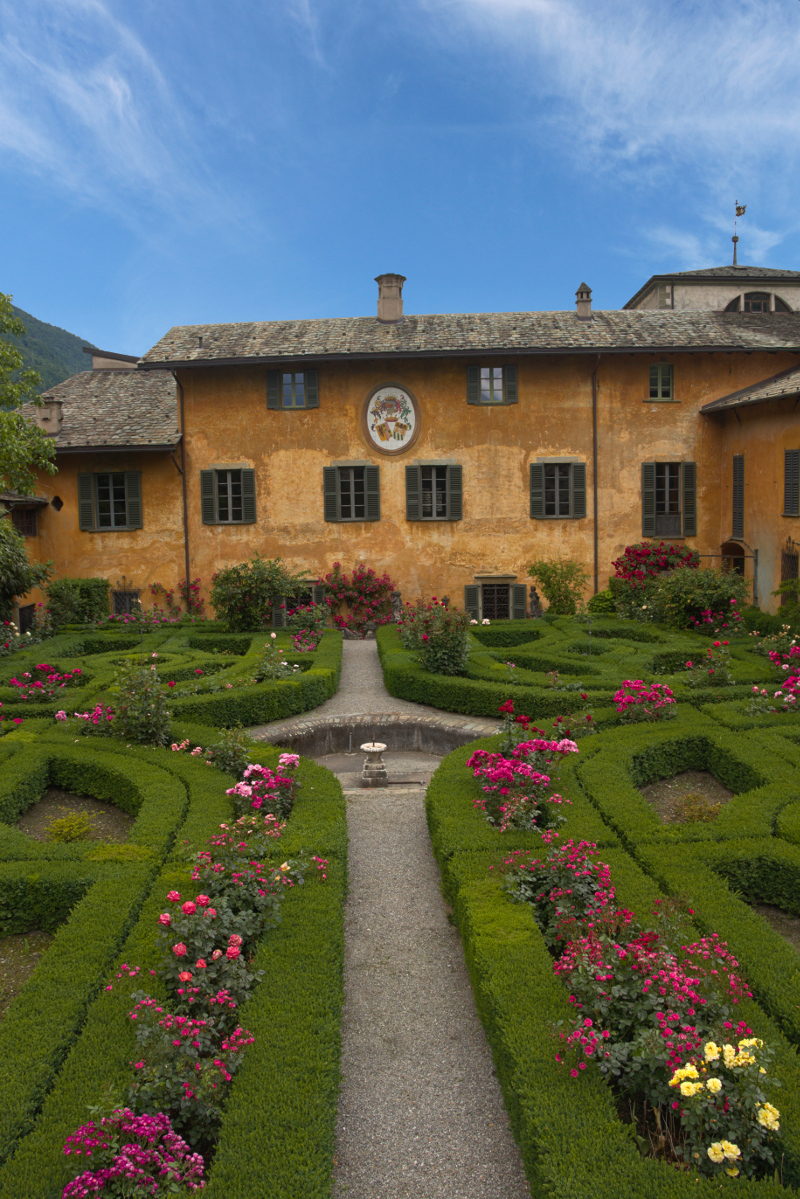
Italian Garden of Palazzo Salis

The rooms surrounding the “Courtyard of Horses” are predominantly decorated with frescoes from the second half of the 17th century, the construction period of the Palazzo. Due to fire damage, the main hall (salone d‘onore) had to be redecorated in the second half of the 18th century by Giovanni Antonio Cucchi, who painted the ceiling, and by Ferdinando Crivelli for the prospective architecture. The room of the Palazzo regarded as the most important is the Saloncello. The decoration of the hall reflects the Salis family's interests and connections. A sign of the family network is the fireplace made in stucco, which represents the marriage between Giovanni Stefano Salis and his first wife Katharina von Wolkenstein. There are numerous coats of arms belonging to important families (e.g. Medici, Borromeo, Visconti) the Salis family had contact with. A notable part of the hall is the thinly vaulted ceiling which uses illusionistic design to create the illusion of an open sky (Trompe-l’œil). On the medallion in the centre of the ceiling there is a representation of Bacchus to represent the economic base of the building as a centre of wine-production and wine-trading.

The historical wine cellars of the Palazzo are situated in its foundation. Constructed already together with the preceding buildings of the Palazzo Salis, most probably from the 15th or 16th century. The production of wine and furthermore the trading of wine to the North have been a highly important economic base of the Family Salis in Tirano. Their delivery market has not been just the Grison area. They brought their wine also to parts of present-days Germany, and sold it even to the court of Vienna of the House of Habsburg.

The Italian Garden of the Palazzo Salis is a rareness in the alpine ambience of northern Italy. The current situation is the result of different phases and changes from the 17th century to the second half of the 19th century. The fondness for beautiful gardens of the family Salis is well documented even in other residences. The central element of the garden is a fountain surrounded by four box hedges that create a maze of evergreen which encloses varieties of roses. The impressive cedar of Lebanon, most likely planted in the 1830s is another highlight of the garden.

From the middle of the 17th century onwards the Palazzo Salis is property of the family Salis without any interruption. In 2007 the Museo PalazzoSalis.Tirano was opened for the public. The wing of the building with the rooms and chambers still decorated with the original frescoes from the 17th and 18th century as well as the historical Italian Garden on the backside of the building are today part of the museum-tour.

== Gallery ==
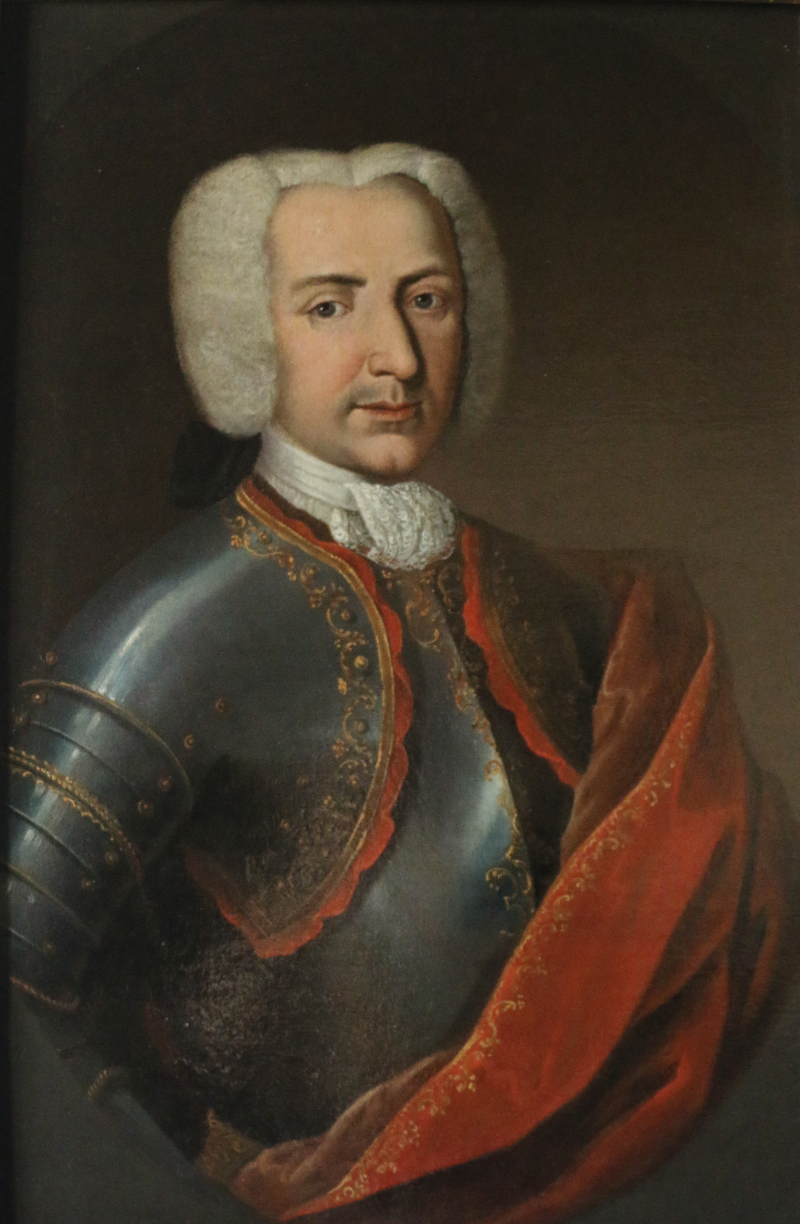
Giovanni Stefano Salis - Son of Giovanni Salis

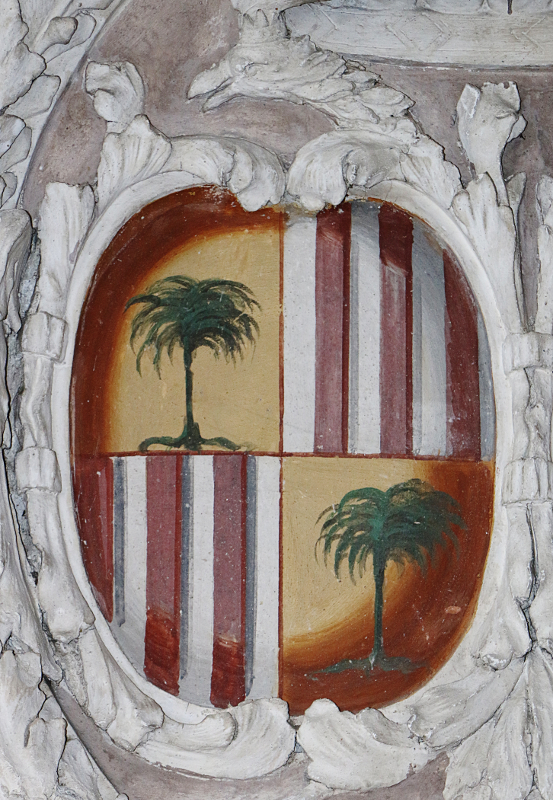
Coat of Arms - Rank of Count (since 1694)

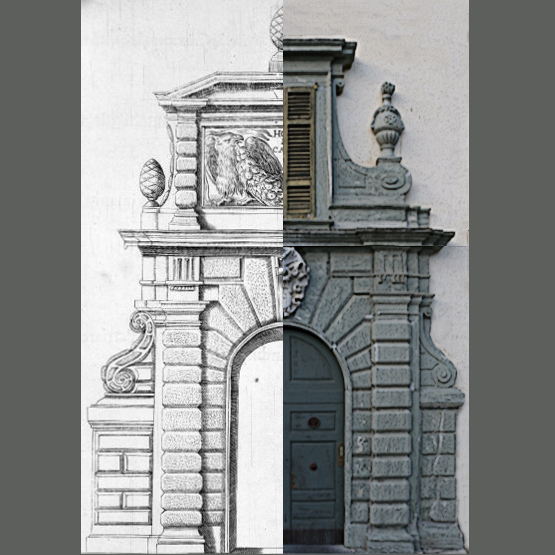
Main doorway - following G. Barozzi

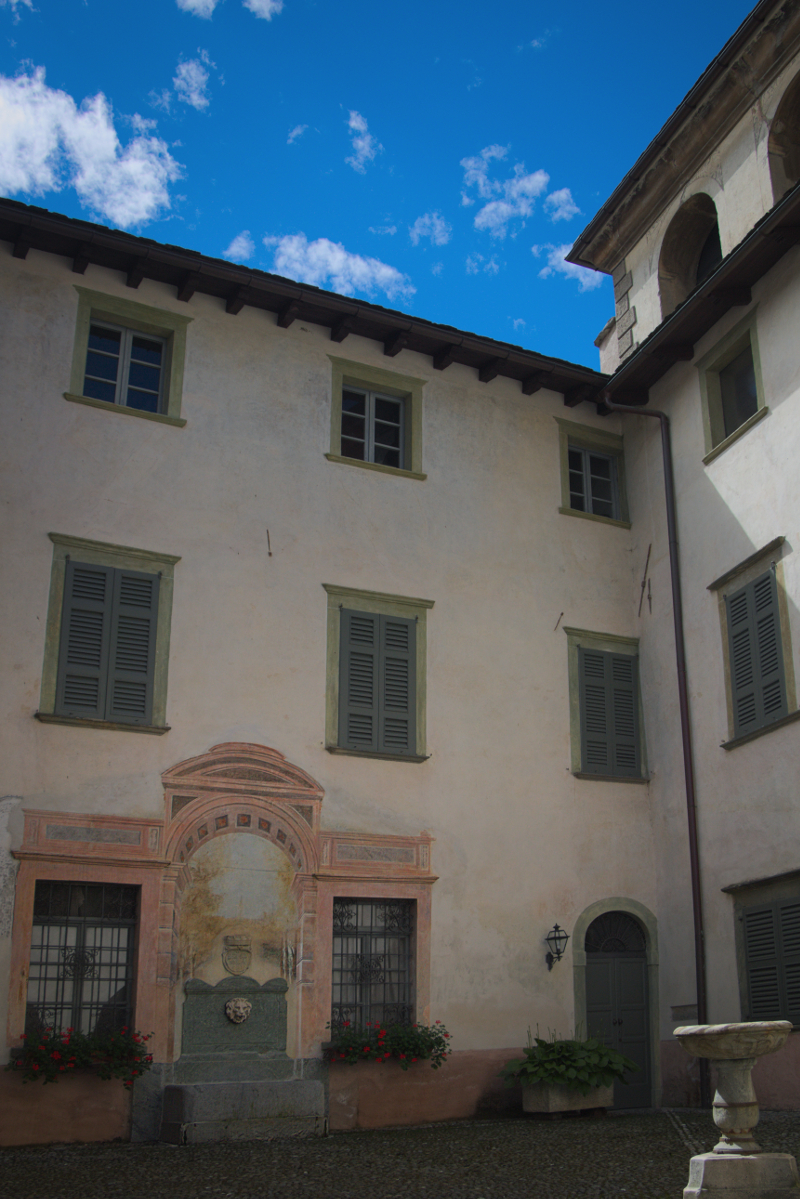
Corte della meridiana

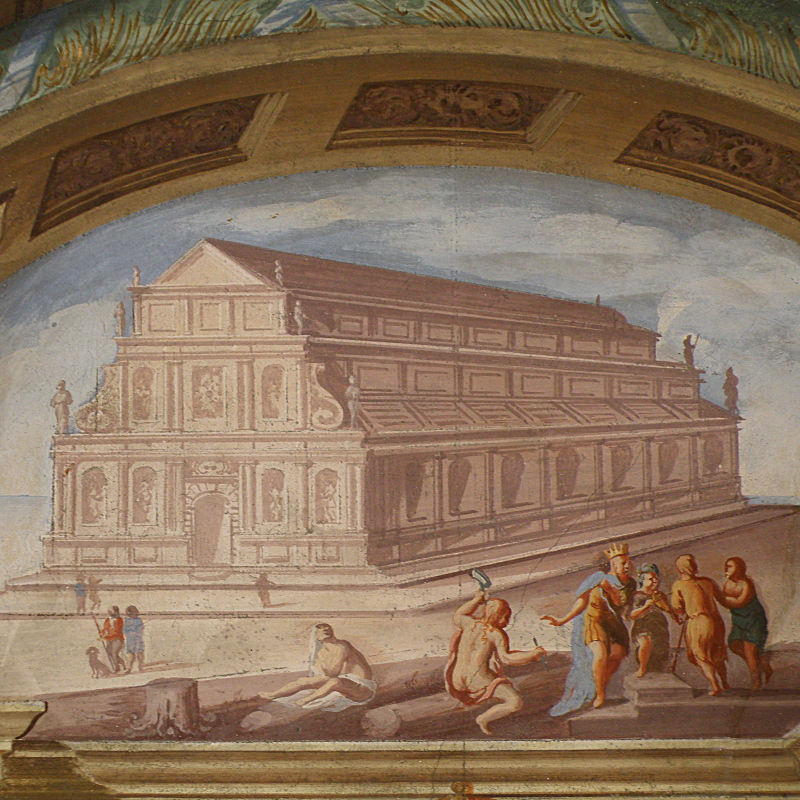
Temple of Artemis; Room of the Eight Wonders

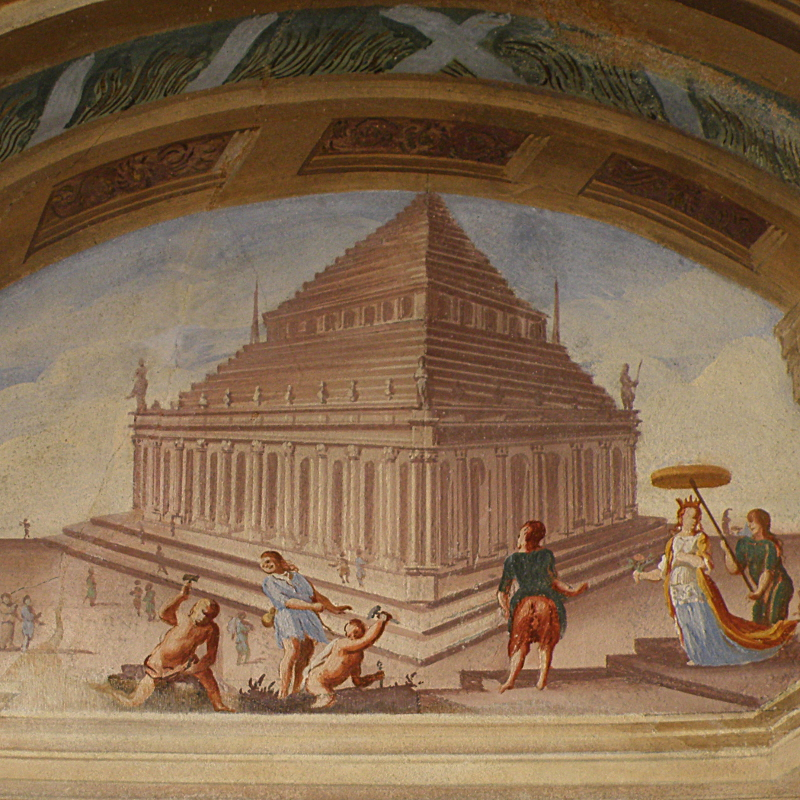
Mausoleum at Halicarnossos; Room of the Eight Wonders

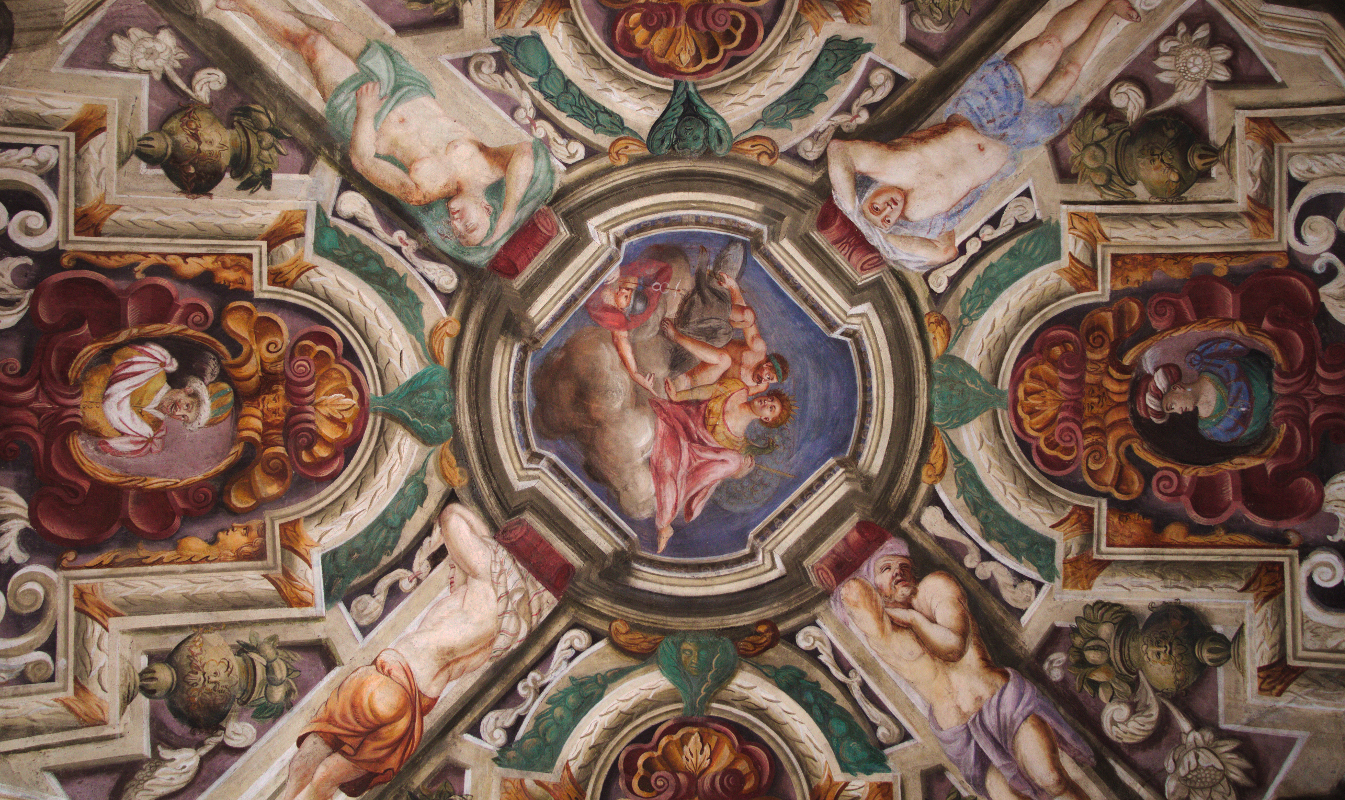
Ceiling fresco; Chamber of Turks

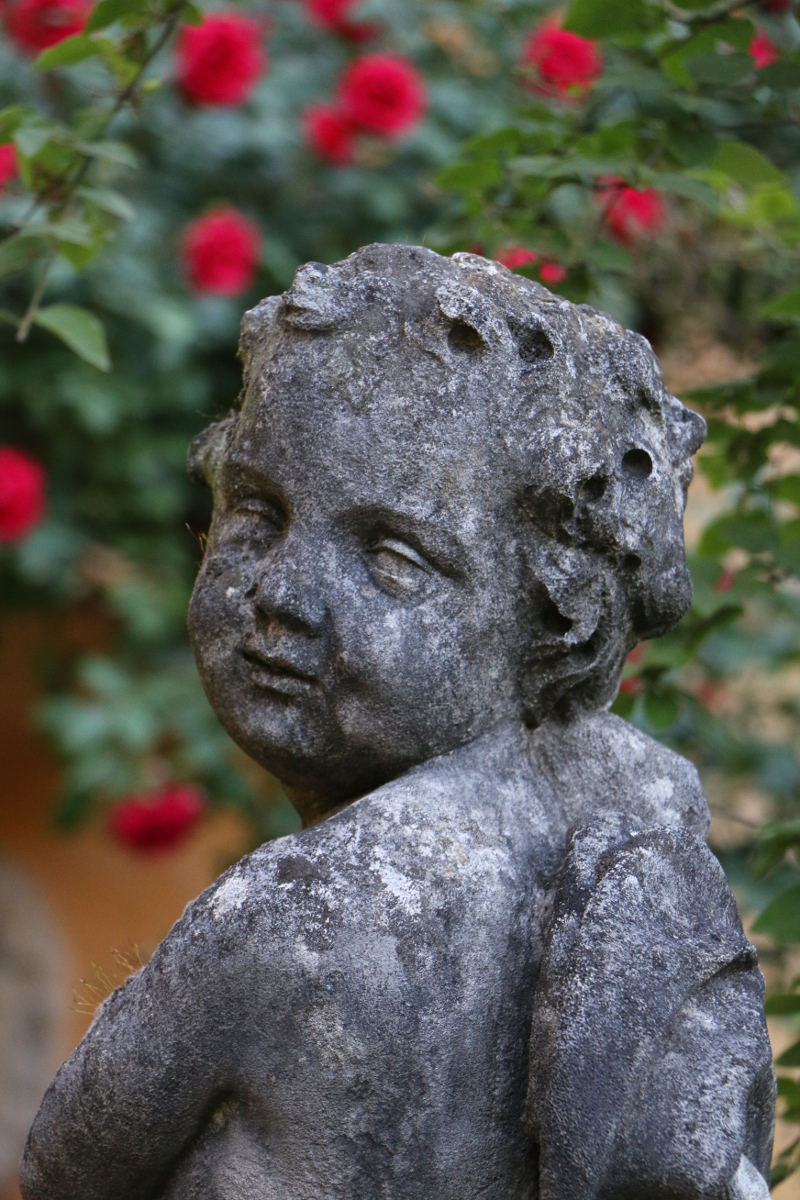
Puto in the garden

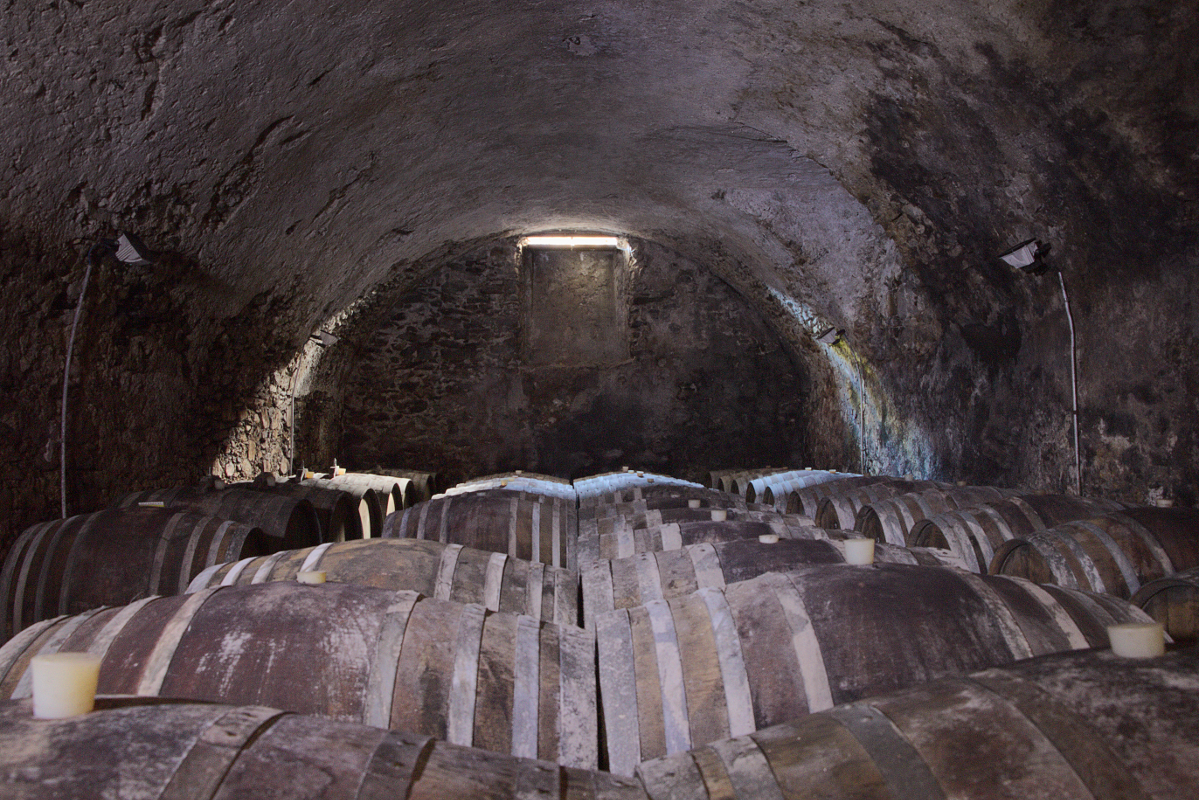
Historical Wine-Cellar

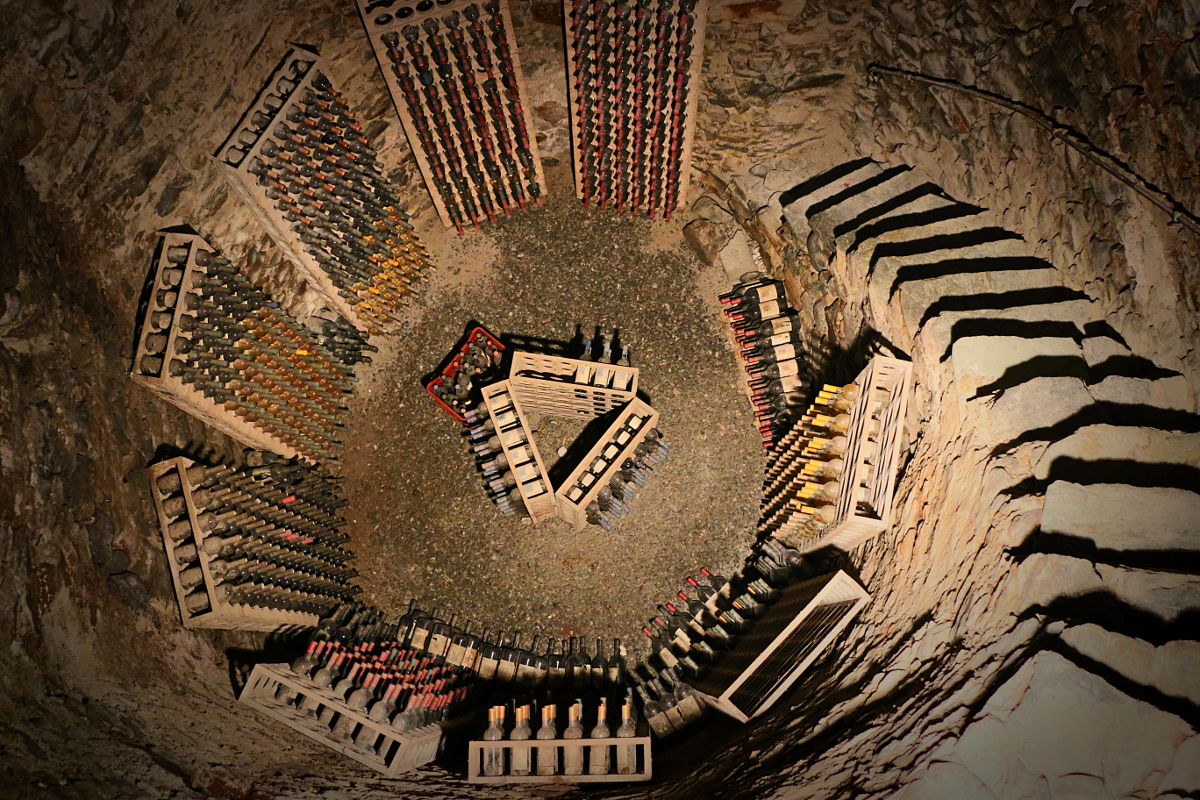
"House of Ice" - ghiacciaia

== Bibliography ==
www.palazzosalis.com

ARCHIVIO SALIS - Palazzo Salis Tirano.

PALAZZO SALIS (it/en/dt) - Führer des Museo PalazzoSalis. Tirano (Sondrio 2015).

Corbellini A. und Hitz F., Die Bündner im Veltlin, in Bormio und in Chiavenna (Sondrio-Poschiavo 2012).

Garbellini G., Tirano - Il centro storico (Sondrio 2009).

Daverio P., L'invencible armada al crocevia di Tirano (CdS 13 April 2013).

Gavazzi S., Residenze nobiliari di Valtellina e Valchiavenna (Sondrio 2002).

Jäger G. u.a. (Hrsg.), Das Ende der Bündner Herrschaft im Veltlin und in den Grafschaften Chiavenna und Bormio 1797 (Sondrio 2001).

Salis-Soglio N., Die Familie von Salis (Lindau 1891).

Sertoli Salis R., I Salis di Valtellina (Sondrio 1953).

Sertoli Salis R., Palazzo Salis di Tirano (Milano 1973).
