= List of museums in Province of Lodi =

This is a list of museums in the Province of Lodi, Lombardy Region, Italy.

== Museums and ecomuseums ==
| Name | Image | Location | City | Province | Network | Area of study | Summary |
|---|---|---|---|---|---|---|---|
| Piccolo Museo dei Lavori Umili | | | Borghetto Lodigiano | Lodi | Sistema museale lodigiano | | |
| Riserva naturale Tenuta del Boscone | | | Castelgerundo | Lodi | Sistema museale lodigiano | | |
| Museo della Civiltà Contadina | | | Cavenago d'Adda | Lodi | Sistema museale lodigiano | Ethnography | |
| Museo della Fotografia di Cavenago D’Adda | | | Cavenago d'Adda | Lodi | Sistema museale lodigiano | | |
| Raccolta d’Arte Carlo Lamberti | | | Codogno | Lodi | Sistema museale lodigiano | | |
| Museo Cabriniano | | | Codogno | Lodi | Sistema museale lodigiano | | |
| Museo del Lavoro Povero e della Civiltà Contadina | | | Livraga | Lodi | Sistema museale lodigiano | | |
| Museo Civico di Lodi – Museo del Tesoro dell’Incoronata | | | Lodi | Lodi | Sistema museale lodigiano | | |
| Museo Diocesano di Arte Sacra | | | Lodi | Lodi | Sistema museale lodigiano | | |
| Museo della Stampa e della Stampa d’Arte di Lodi | | | Lodi | Lodi | Sistema museale lodigiano | | |
| Collezione Anatomica Paolo Gorini | | | Lodi | Lodi | Sistema museale lodigiano | | |
| Museo Ettore Archinti | | | Lodi | Lodi | Sistema museale lodigiano | | |
| Collezione Didattica piccolo Museo della Musica | | | Lodi | Lodi | Sistema museale lodigiano | | |
| Museo di Scienze Naturali del Collegio San Francesco | | | Lodi | Lodi | Sistema museale lodigiano | | |
| Ecomuseo della Cascina Grazzanello | | | Mairago | Lodi | Sistema museale lodigiano | | |
| Osservatorio astronomico del Lodigiano | | | Mairago | Lodi | Sistema museale lodigiano | | |
| Museo di Vita Contadina | | | Montanaso Lombardo | Lodi | Sistema museale lodigiano | | |
| Mostra permanente di antiquariato di Villa Litta | | | Orio Litta | Lodi | Sistema museale lodigiano | | |
| Museo Il mondo nel Presepio | | | Salerano sul Lambro | Lodi | Sistema museale lodigiano | | |
| Museo Morando Bolognini e Museo del Pane – Museo Lombardo di Storia dell’Agricoltura | | | Sant’Angelo Lodigiano | Lodi | Sistema museale lodigiano | | |
| Casa natale di F. Cabrini | | | Sant’Angelo Lodigiano | Lodi | Sistema museale lodigiano | | |
| Museo della Basilica | | | Sant’Angelo Lodigiano | Lodi | Sistema museale lodigiano | | |
| Museo del giocattolo e del bambino | | | Santo Stefano Lodigiano | Lodi | Sistema museale lodigiano | | |
| Lodi-Castiglione d’Adda - Zelo Buon Persico Riserva naturale Monticchie - Somaglia, Parco Ittico Paradiso - Zelo Buon Persico | | | Parco dell’Adda Sud | Lodi | Sistema museale lodigiano | | |
