= Tirano =

Comune in Lombardy, Italy

Tirano Tiran (Lombard)
- Comune
- Città di Tirano
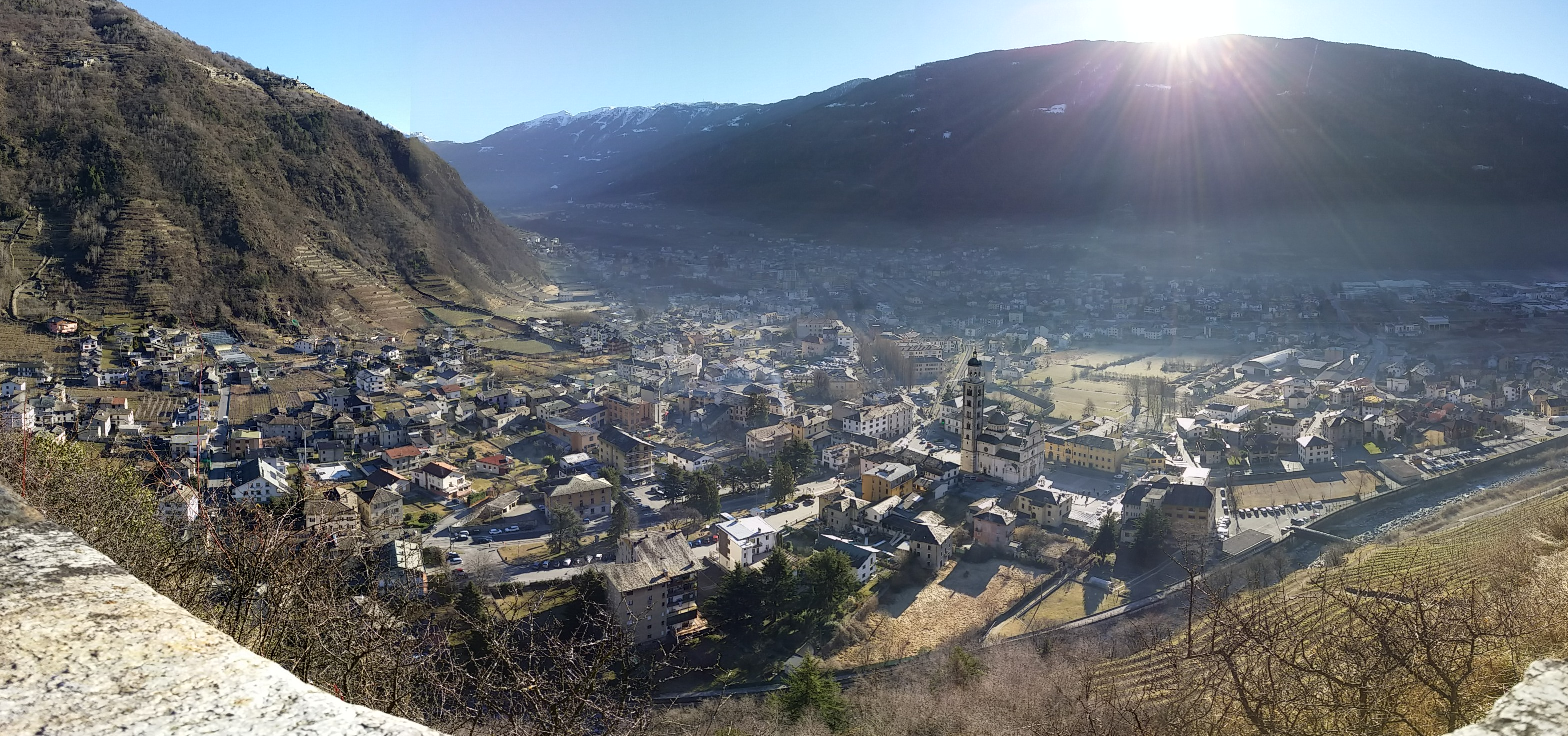

- Flag

- Tirano within the Province of Sondrio

- Location within Italy Location within Lombardy
- Coordinates: 46°12′59″N 10°10′08″E
- Country: Italy
- Region: Lombardy
- Province: Province of Sondrio (SO)
- Frazioni: Baruffini, Cologna, Madonna di Tirano, Roncaiola

Government
  - Mayor: Franco Spada

Area
  - Total: 32 km^{2} (12 sq mi)
- Elevation: 441 m (1,447 ft)

Population (31 August 2016)
  - Total: 9,053
  - Density: 280/km^{2} (730/sq mi)
- Demonym: Tiranesi
- Time zone: UTC+1 (CET)
  - Summer (DST): UTC+2 (CEST)
- Postal code: 23037
- Dialing code: 0342
- Patron saint: Martin of Tours
- Saint day: 11 November
- Website: Official website

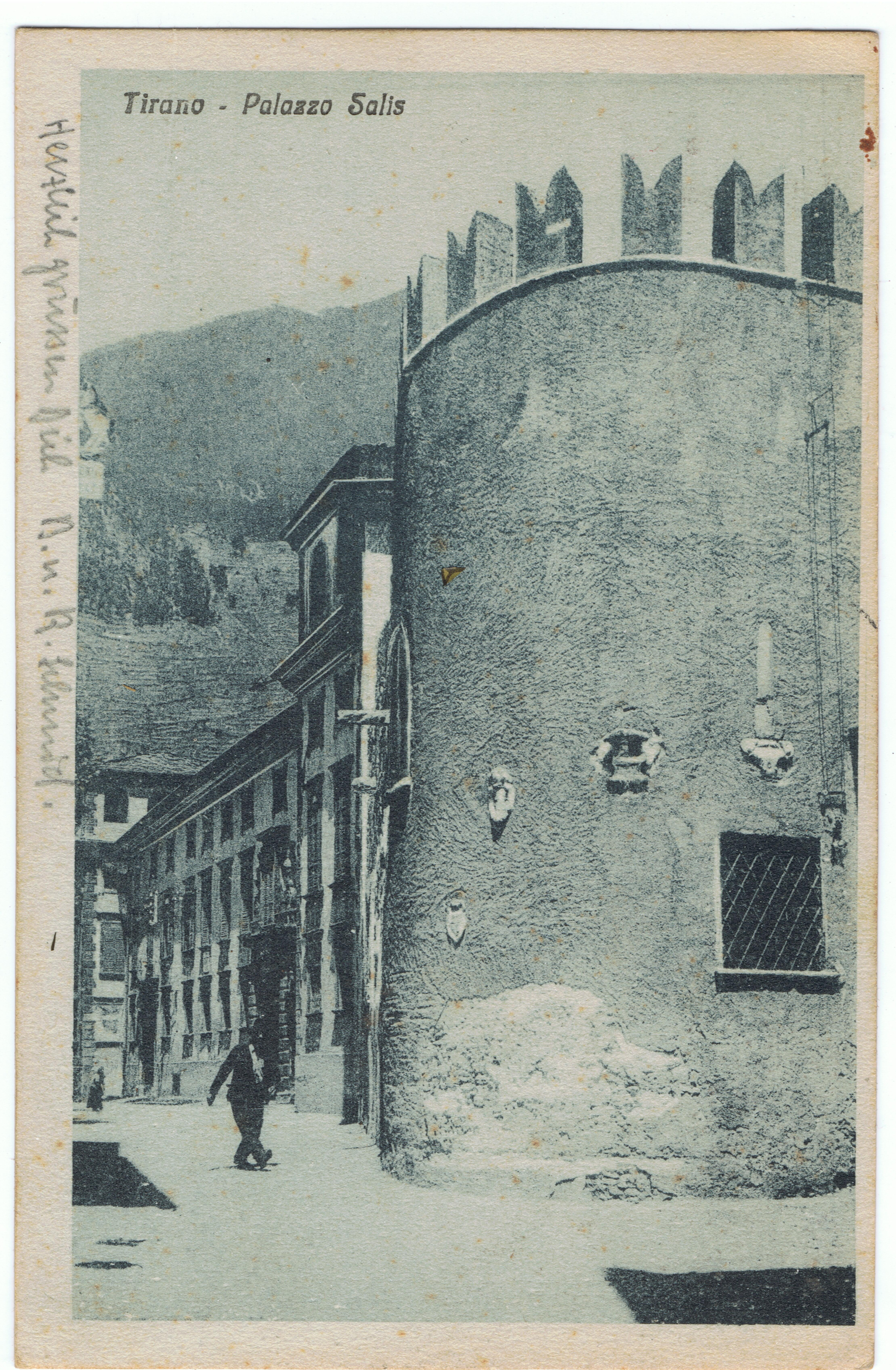
Postcard of Palazzo Salis (now Sertoli-Salis) from 1911.

Tirano (Lombard: Tiran; German: Thiran) is a town and comune (municipality) in Valtellina, located in the province of Sondrio, Lombardy (northern Italy). It has 9,053 inhabitants (2016) and is adjacent to the Italy–Switzerland border. The river Adda flows through the town.

== Main sights ==
Located nearby is the Catholic shrine of the Madonna di Tirano, a major tourist attraction. The shrine is dedicated to the appearance of the Blessed Mother to Mario Degli Omodei on 29 September 1504, an event religious pilgrims credit with ending a pestilence.

The Museo Etnografico Tiranese (MET) is an ethnographic museum and located nearby the Basilica Madonna di Tirano in an 18th-century Palazzo, the Casa del Penitenziere (Penitent's House).

The museum of Palazzo Salis in the old town of Tirano is an example of the use of trompe l'oeil to create the illusion of architectural features.

== Transportation ==
Tirano has two neighboring railway stations. One, a standard gauge station, is operated by Trenitalia, the state railway company, and is terminus of the Tirano–Lecco railway.

The other, a metre gauge station, is operated by the Rhaetian Railway (RhB). The line of the Bernina Railway connects St. Moritz (canton of Graubünden/Switzerland) with Tirano. The Bernina Express of RhB runs over this line to Chur. The complete line was opened in 1910. In 2008, the Bernina Railway as well as the Albula Railway were added by UNESCO to the list of UNESCO World Heritage Sites.

== Notable people ==
- Raffaele Venusti (d.1543), Catholic apologist
- Rosa Genoni (1867–1954), Italian stylist
