= List of museums in Province of Pavia =

This is a list of museums in the Province of Pavia, Lombardy Region, Italy.

== Museums and ecomuseums ==
Name	Image	Location	City	Network	Area of study	Summary
Museo del Contadino			Frascarolo	Lomellina Musei	Ethnography	
Museo Archeologico Lomellino Gambolò				Lomellina Musei	Archeology	
Museo Archeologico Nazionale della Lomellina						
Museo Regina			Mede Lomellina	Lomellina Musei	Archeology, Natural History	
Museo di Arte e Tradizione Contadina Olevano di Lomellina			Olevano Lomellina	Lomellina Musei	Ethnography	
Musei della Fondazione Sartirana Arte Sartirana			Mede Lomellina	Lomellina Musei	Ethnography	
Basilica di Santa Maria Maggiore e Battistero di San Giovanni			Lomello	Lomellina Musei		
Art Collection of the parish of San Lorenzo di Mortara			Mortara	Lomellina Musei		
Museo Povere Cose di Povera Gente			Sommo	Lomellina Musei	Ethnography	
Ecomuseo del Paesaggio Lomellino						
Raccolta di Cose e Memorie del Tempo						
Museo della Certosa di Pavia						
Museo Civici di Pavia			Pavia		Archeology, Art, History	Sezioni Archeologica, Longobarda, Romanica, Rinascimentale, and Scultura moderna e Gipsoteca; Pinacoteca Malaspina (pinacoteca antica); Sala del Modello ligneo del Duomo; Pinacoteca del '600-'700; Quadreria dell'800 e Collezione Morone; Museo del Risorgimento; Museo Luigi Robecchi Bricchetti
Museo per la Storia dell'Università						
Museo di Archeologia			Pavia	University of Pavia		
Museo di Storia Naturale			Pavia	University of Pavia		
Museo della Tecnica Electrica						
Museo Camillo Golgi						
Orto Botanico dell'Università di Pavia			Pavia	University of Pavia	Botanical garden	
Giardino Botanico Alpino di Pietra Corva di Romagnese			Romagnese		Botanical garden	
