= List of museums in Province of Como =

This is a list of museums in the Province of Como, Lombardy Region, Italy.

== Museums and ecomuseums ==
Name	Image	Location	City	Province	Network	Area of study	Summary
Museo della Stampa “Sampietro” della Regio Insubrica			Carlazzo	Como	Sistema museale territoriale Alpi Lepontine		
Museo della Riserva naturale lago di Piano			Carlazzo	Como	Sistema museale territoriale Alpi Lepontine	Natural history	
Museo Etnografico del Latte			Carlazzo	Como	Sistema museale territoriale Alpi Lepontine	Ethnography	
Museo della Valle			Cavargna	Como	Sistema museale territoriale Alpi Lepontine, museum recognized.	Ethnography	
Museo Etnografico Naturalistico della Val Sanagra			Grandola ed Uniti	Como	Sistema museale territoriale Alpi Lepontine, museum recognized	Ethnography	
Raccolta Museale di Villa Vigoni			Menaggio	Como	Sistema museale territoriale Alpi Lepontine		
Casa Rurare di Carcente			San Siro	Como	Sistema museale territoriale Alpi Lepontine	Ethnography	
Museo Casa Pagani			Valsolda	Como	Sistema museale territoriale Alpi Lepontine		
Tempietto di San Fedelino			Sorico	Como	Sistema museale della Valchiavenna		
Museo Etnografico e dell'Acqua			Albese con Cassano	Como			
Raccolta museale dell'avifauna lombarda			Arosio	Como			
Villa Melzi			Bellagio	Como			
Galleria del Design e dell'Arredamento			Cantù	Como			
Museo dello Stucco e della Scagliola intelvese			Cerano d'Intelvi	Como			
Museo della Resistenza Comasca			Dongo	Como			
Museo del Dialetto della Comunità Montana Alto Lario Occidentale			Dosso del Liro	Como			
Museo Buco del Piombo			Erba	Como			
Museo civico			Erba	Como			
Museo del Cavallo Giocattolo			Grandate	Como			
Museo dei Fossili dei Monti intelvesi			Lanzo d'Intelvi	Como			
Museo Diocesano d'Arte Sacra			Lanzo d'Intelvi	Como			
Villa del Balbianello			Lenno	Como	Museum recognized		
Museo del Ciclismo Madonna del Ghisallo			Magreglio	Como			
Associazione la Raccolta della barca lariana			Pianello del Lario	Como			
Casa Museo della Civiltà Contadina			Ponna	Como			
Villa Carlotta			Tremezzo	Como	Museum recognized		
Museo Storico e Armeria della Casa Militare "Umberto I"			Turate	Como		History	
Museo di Didattica di Storia Naturale e di Fisica del Liceo "A. Volta"			Como	Como			
Musei Civici - Civico museo archeologico, Laboratorio di archeologia			Como	Como	Museum recognized		
Musei Civici - Civico museo storico			Como	Como	Museum recognized		
Musei Civici - Pinacoteca civica di Palazzo Volpi			Como	Como	Museum recognized		
Musei Civici - Tempio voltiano			Como	Como	Museum recognized		
Museo Didattico della Seta			Como	Como	Museum recognized		
