= List of museums in Province of Mantua =

List of museums in Mantua Province, Lombardy, Italy

This is a list of museums in the Province of Mantua, Lombardy Region, Italy.

== Museums and ecomuseums ==
Abbreviations: Sistema provinciale dei musei e dei beni culturali mantovani (SPMBCM)

Name	Image	Location	City	Province	Network	Area of study	Summary
Museo civico Bellini			Asola	Mantua	SPMBCM		
Parco archeologico del Forcello			Bagnolo San Vito	Mantua	SPMBCM		
Museo della civiltà contadina e artigianale			Bagnolo San Vito	Mantua	SPMBCM		
Museo del tartufo			Borgo Franco Po	Mantua	SPMBCM		
Museo civico / Ecomuseo Valli Oglio Chiese			Canneto sull’Oglio	Mantua	SPMBCM		
Castello medievale / Ecomuseo della risaia dei fiumi e del paesaggio rurale mantovano			Castel Dario	Mantua	SPMBCM		
Museo di armi antiche Baboni			Castellucchio	Mantua	SPMBCM		
Museo internazionale della Croce rossa			Castiglione delle Stiviere	Mantua	SPMBCM		
Museo Aloisiano			Castiglione delle Stiviere	Mantua	SPMBCM		
Museo archeologico dell'Alto mantovano			Cavriana	Mantua	SPMBCM		
Museo della II Guerra mondiale del fiume Po			Felonica	Mantua	SPMBCM		
Museo di arte moderna e contemporanea			Gazoldo degli Ippoliti	Mantua	SPMBCM		
Centro della comunicazione audiovisiva - Collezione Oreste Coni			Gazzuolo	Mantua	SPMBCM		
Museo di Palazzo Te			Mantua	Mantua	SPMBCM		
Museo di San Sebastiano - museo della città			Mantua	Mantua	SPMBCM		
Museo Diocesano			Mantua	Mantua	SPMBCM		
Museo di Palazzo d'Arco			Mantua	Mantua	SPMBCM		
Museo numismatico e galleria d'arte della Fondazione BAM			Mantua	Mantua	SPMBCM		
Accademia Nazionale Virgiliana			Mantua	Mantua	SPMBCM		
Museo Tazio Nuvolari			Mantua	Mantua	SPMBCM		
Casa della Beata Osanna Andreasi			Mantua	Mantua	SPMBCM		
Galleria Storica Vigili del fuoco			Mantua	Mantua	SPMBCM		
Galleria Valenti Gonzaga			Mantua	Mantua	SPMBCM		
Civica Raccolta d'arte			Medole	Mantua	SPMBCM		
Ecomuseo delle bonifiche			Moglia	Mantua	SPMBCM		
Museo archeologico			Ostiglia	Mantua	SPMBCM		
Museo della Farmacopea			Ostiglia	Mantua	SPMBCM		
Palazzina Mondadori			Ostiglia	Mantua	SPMBCM		
Fondo Musicale Greggiati			Ostiglia	Mantua	SPMBCM		
Torri medievali			Ostiglia	Mantua	SPMBCM		
Museo civico			Pegognaga	Mantua	SPMBCM		
Pinacoteca comunale			Quistello	Mantua	SPMBCM		
Museo diffuso Giuseppe Gorni			Quistello	Mantua	SPMBCM		
Museo del Po			Revere	Mantua	SPMBCM		
Museo etnografico dei mestieri del fiume			Rodigo	Mantua	SPMBCM		
Museo diffuso Conca del Bertazzolo - Ecomuseo della risaia dei fiumi e del paesaggio rurale mantovano			Roncoferraro	Mantua	SPMBCM		
Museo diffuso della città			Sabbioneta	Mantua	SPMBCM		
Museo d'Arte sacra A passo d'uomo			Sabbioneta	Mantua	SPMBCM		
Museo civico Polironiano			San Benedetto Po	Mantua	SPMBCM		
Museo del Risorgimento di Solferino e San Martino			Solferino	Mantua	SPMBCM		
Galleria del premio Suzzara			Suzzara	Mantua	SPMBCM		
MUVI - Museo civico Parazzi e Galleria d'arte contemporanea			Viadana	Mantua	SPMBCM		
Castello Scaligero - Ecomuseo della risaia dei fiumi e del paesaggio rurale mantovano			Villimpenta	Mantua	SPMBCM		
Museo della Fondazione Francioli Nuvolari			Villimpenta	Mantua	SPMBCM		
Museo Civico G. Bellini			Asola	Mantua	Network of archeological museums of the provinces of Brescia, Cremona and Mantua	Archeology	
Museo Archeologico dell’Alto Mantovano			Cavriana	Mantua	Network of archeological museums of the provinces of Brescia, Cremona and Mantua	Archeology	
Museo Civico A. Parazzi			Viadana	Mantua	Network of archeological museums of the provinces of Brescia, Cremona and Mantua	Archeology	
Parco Archeologico del Forcello			Bagnolo San Vito	Mantua	Network of archeological museums of the provinces of Brescia, Cremona and Mantua	Archeology	
