= Raffaele Venusti =

Italian Catholic apologist and thinker

Raffaele Venusti (or Venosta) was an Italian Catholic apologist.

== Biography ==
He was born at Tirano, Valtellina, northern Italy, about the end of the fifteenth century. He joined the Canons Regular of SS. Salvatore, devoting himself to theological and canonical studies, and winning fame as a powerful Catholic controversialist against the Lutherans and Calvinists.

When the discussion concerning the divorce of Henry VIII of England arose, Venusti was invited both by the king and by the Habsburg Emperor Charles V, the protector of Catherine of Aragon, to write an expression of his views on the question.

He died at Venice in 1543.

== Writings ==
His polemical and apologetic works were printed in 1543; they treat of the Catholic doctrine as opposed to Protestantism, especially of the notes of the Church of Rome, free will, the councils etc.

These writings have a special historical value as representing the first phase of anti-Lutheran, anti-Calvinistic Catholic polemics, a phase which gave way later to the writings of Catholic theologians like Melchior Cano and the early Jesuit theologians. This class to which Venusti belonged is, in theology, parallel to the group of Catholic apologists in the field of history, who were predecessors of Baronius in his controversies with the Protestant Centuriators of Magdeburg.
