= List of museums in Province of Brescia =

This is a list of museums in the Province of Brescia, Lombardy Region, Italy.

== Museums and ecomuseums ==
Name	Image	Location	City	Province	Network	Area of study	Summary
Museo Giacomo Bergomi – Civica Pinacoteca Antonio e Laura Pasinetti			Montichiari	Brescia	Montichiari Musei		
Castello Bonoris			Montichiari	Brescia	Montichiari Musei		
Palazzo dell’Archeologia e della Storia del Territorio			Montichiari	Brescia	Montichiari Musei		
Museo Risorgimentale Agostino Bianchi			Montichiari	Brescia	Montichiari Musei		
Palazzo Tabarino			Montichiari	Brescia	Montichiari Musei		
Museo Etnografico del Ferro delle Arti e Tradizioni Popolari			Bienno	Brescia	Sistema musei di Valle Camonica		
Museo dell’Industria Eugenio Battisti			Brescia	Brescia	Sistema musei di Valle Camonica		
Casa Museo di Cerveno			Cerveno	Brescia	Sistema musei di Valle Camonica		
Casa Museo Camillo Golgi			Corteno Golgi	Brescia	Sistema musei di Valle Camonica		
Civico Museo Etnografico del Ferro le Fudine di Malegno			Malegno	Brescia	Sistema musei di Valle Camonica		
Casa Museo della Gente di Lozio			Ossimo	Brescia	Sistema musei di Valle Camonica		
Museo Etnografico Ossimo			Ossimo	Brescia	Sistema musei di Valle Camonica		
Museo della Guerra Bianca in Adamello			Temù	Brescia	Sistema musei di Valle Camonica		
Museo Etnografico dell’Alta Valle Camonica L. Zuf Di V.			Vione	Brescia	Sistema musei di Valle Camonica		
Parco della Rocca d’Anfo			Anfo	Brescia	Sistema museale della Valle Sabbia		
Raccolta Etnografica “Habitar in Staterra”			Bagolino	Brescia	Sistema museale della Valle Sabbia	Ethnography	
Area Archeologica della Corna Nibbia			Bione	Brescia	Sistema museale della Valle Sabbia	Archeology	
Museo della Guerra 15/18 e dei Reperti Bellici			Capovalle	Brescia	Sistema museale della Valle Sabbia	History	
Antica Fucina Zanetti			Casto	Brescia	Sistema museale della Valle Sabbia	Ethnography	
Museo Archeologico della Valle Sabbia			Gavardo	Brescia	Sistema museale della Valle Sabbia	Archeology	
Museo del Ferro – Fucina di Pamparane			Odolo	Brescia	Sistema museale della Valle Sabbia	Ethnography	
Forno Fusorio di Livemmo			Pertica Alta	Brescia	Sistema museale della Valle Sabbia	Ethnography	
Museo della Resistenza e del Folklore Valsabbino			Pertica Bassa	Brescia	Sistema museale della Valle Sabbia	Ethnography and history	
Museo della Civiltà contadina e dei Mestieri			Sabbio Chiese	Brescia	Sistema museale della Valle Sabbia	Ethnography	
Associazione Museo del Lavoro			Vestone	Brescia	Sistema museale della Valle Sabbia	Ethnography	
Miniera S. Aloio Tassara di Collio			Collio s/M	Brescia	Sistema museale della Valle Trompia		
Museo Etnografico di Lodrino			Lodrino	Brescia	Sistema museale della Valle Trompia		
Museo delle Armi e della Tradizione Armiera di Gardone			Gardone V.T.	Brescia	Sistema museale della Valle Trompia		
Museo il Maglio Averoldi di Ome			Ome	Brescia	Sistema museale della Valle Trompia		
Casa Museo Pietro Malossi			Ome	Brescia	Sistema museale della Valle Trompia		
Museo le Miniere di Pezzaze			Pezzaze	Brescia	Sistema museale della Valle Trompia		
Museo i Magli di Sarezzo			Sarezzo	Brescia	Sistema museale della Valle Trompia		
Museo il Forno di Tavernole			Tavernole s/M	Brescia	Sistema museale della Valle Trompia		
Museo della città Santa Giulia			Brescia	Brescia	Network of archeological museums of the provinces of Brescia, Cremona and Mantua	Archeology	
Museo Civico Archeologico G. Rambotti			Desenzano sul Garda	Brescia	Network of archeological museums of the provinces of Brescia, Cremona and Mantua	Archeology	
Civico Museo Archeologico della Valle Sabbia			Gavardo	Brescia	Network of archeological museums of the provinces of Brescia, Cremona and Mantua	Archeology	
Museo Civico Archeologico della Valtenesi			Manerba del Garda	Brescia	Network of archeological museums of the provinces of Brescia, Cremona and Mantua	Archeology	
Civico Museo Archeologico			Manerbio	Brescia	Network of archeological museums of the provinces of Brescia, Cremona and Mantua	Archeology	
Civico Museo Archeologico			Remedello	Brescia	Network of archeological museums of the provinces of Brescia, Cremona and Mantua	Archeology	
Giardino Botanico Sperimentale "Giordano Emilio Ghirardi"			Toscolano-Maderno	Brescia	Network of botanical gardens	Botanical garden	
Giardino Botanico Fondazione André Heller			Gardone Riviera	Brescia		Botanical garden	
Giardino Botanico Trebbo Trebbi			Mompiano	Brescia		Botanical garden	
Museo Nazionale della Valcamonica di Cividate Camuno			Cividate Camuno	Brescia		Archeology	
