= Francine Saillant =

Canadian anthropologist and intellectual (born 1953)

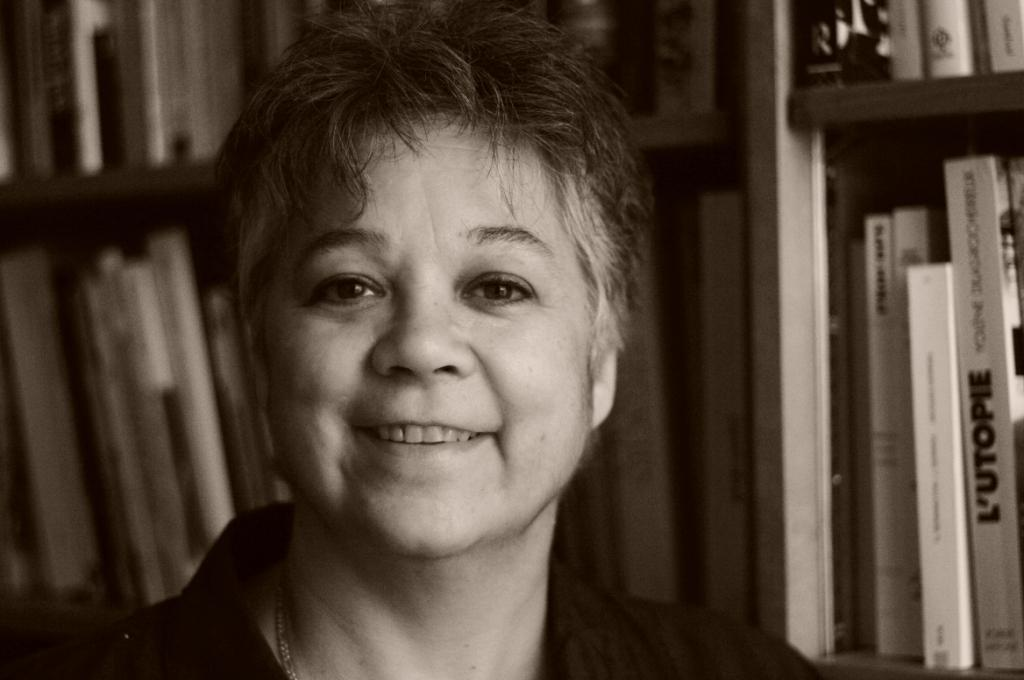
- Born: 1953 (age 72–73)
- Awards: Royal Society of Canada

Academic background
- Education: McGill University

Academic work
- Institutions: Laval University
- Main interests: anthropologist
- Notable works: Anthropologie et sociétés

Francine Saillant (born 1953) is a Canadian anthropologist and intellectual.

== Biography ==
Saillant received her Ph.D. from McGill University in 1987. She is a professor in the Department of Anthropology at Laval University since 1996; and serves as the director of the Centre interuniversitaire sur les lettres, les arts et les traditions (Interuniversity Centre for letters, arts and traditions; CÉLAT). Saillant has directed the efforts of the journal Anthropologie et sociétés for more ten years. She was appointed in 2008 to be a member of the Royal Society of Canada. In 2013, she was co-chair of the 81st Congress of the Association francophone pour le savoir.

== Selected works ==
- 2013 Droits et cultures en mouvements (avec Karoline Truchon, dirs). Québec, PUL, 288 p.
- 2012 Afrodescendances, cultures et droits (avec Alexandrine Boudreault-Fournier, dirs). Québec, PUL, 244 p.
- 2012 Récits collectifs et nouvelles écritures visuelles (avec Michaël La Chance, dirs). Québec, PUL, 276 p.
- 2011 Manifeste de Lausanne. Pour une anthropologie non hégémonique (avec Mondher Kilani et Florence Graezer Bideau, dirs). Montréal, Liber, 141 p.
- 2009 Exclusions et inégalités sociales. Enjeux et défis de l'intervention publique (avec Éric Gagnon, Yolande Pelchat, Michèle Clément). Québec, PUL, 206 p.
- 2009 Réinventer l'anthropologie? Les sciences de la culture à l'épreuve des globalisations, Montréal, Liber, 252 p.
- 2007 Identités, handicaps, interventions posthumanitaires au Brésil. La dignité pour horizon. Paris, Karthala, 412 p.
- 2006 Medical Anthropology. Regional Perspectives and Shared Concerns (avec Serge Genest). Malden, Blackwell Publishing, 305 p.
- 2006 De la responsabilité. Éthique et politique (avec Éric Gagnon). Montréal, Liber, Collection Éthique publique hors série, 287 p.
- 2005 Anthropologie de la santé. Ancrages locaux, défis globaux (avec Serge Genest). Québec, PUL/Anthropos, 450 p.
- 2005 Communautés et socialités (avec Éric Gagnon). Montréal, Liber, 281 p.
- 2004 Identités, vulnérabilités, communautés (avec Michèle Clément et Charles Gaucher). Québec, Nota bene, 333 p.
- 2003 Transformations sociales, genre et santé. Perspectives critiques et comparatives (avec Manon Boulianne, dirs). Québec/Paris, PUL/L'Harmattan, 306 p.
- 2002 Fenêtres ouvertes. Dire et partager l'aide et les soins (avec Odile Sévigny et Sylvie Khandjian). Montréal, Écosociété, 199 p.
- 2000 GAGNON Eric, Francine SAILLANT, et autres. De la dépendance et de l'accompagnement. Soins à domicile et liens sociaux. Québec, Paris, PUL/l'Harmattan, 232 p.
- 1996 Interior Passages. Obesity and Transformation. Toronto, Second Story Press, Traduction anglaise de Au cœur de la baleine (Montréal, Remue-Ménage, 1994).
- 1994 Au cœur de la baleine. Obésité et transformation. Montréal, Remue-Ménage, 158 p.
- 1988 Culture et cancer. Produire le sens de la maladie. Montréal, St Martin, 317 p.
- 1997 Accoucher autrement. Repères historiques, sociaux et culturels sur la grossesse et l'accouchement au Québec (avec Michel O'Neill). Montréal, St-Martin. 585 p.
- 1983 Essai sur la santé des femmes (avec Maria De Koninck et Lise Dunnigan). Québec, Conseil du statut de la femme, 341 p.
- 1981 Ruptures. Montréal, Dérives

== Filmography ==
- 2010 Les voix Zumbi (with Alexandrine Boudreault-Fournier), CÉLAT, Université Laval, 15 minutes.
- 2009 Vie et mort dans le candomblé (with Pedro Simonard), Québec, LAMIC, Université Laval. 75 minutes
- 2009 Le navire négrier(with Pedro Simonard), Québec, LAMIC, Université Laval. 45 minutes
- 2009 Axé Dignité (with Pedro Simonard), Québec, LAMIC, Université Laval. 52 minute
- 2007 Buscapé. Un espace pour tous (with Patrick Fougeyrollas and Merdad Hage). Montréal, les productions de l'Autre Œil. 20 minutes

== Awards ==
- 2008: Member, Société royale du Canada
- 1996: Prix Laura-Jamienson de l'ICREF (Institut canadien de recherche sur les femmes)
- 1988: Prix de l'Association des éditeurs Canadiens
