= List of museums in Province of Bergamo =

This is a list of museums in the Province of Bergamo, Lombardy Region, Italy.

== Museums and ecomuseums ==
Name	Image	Location	City	Province	Network	Area of study	Summary
Museo San Martino			Alzano Lombardo	Bergamo	Rete dei musei della Diocesi di Bergamo		
Museo Diocesano Adriano Bernareggi			Bergamo	Bergamo	Rete dei musei della Diocesi di Bergamo		
Museo della Basilica			Gandino	Bergamo	Rete dei musei della Diocesi di Bergamo		
Museo d’Arte e Cultura Sacra			Romano di Lombardia	Bergamo	Rete dei musei della Diocesi di Bergamo		
Museo Santa Maria Assunta			Vertova	Bergamo	Rete dei musei della Diocesi di Bergamo		
Museo Navale Ottorino Zibetti			Caravaggio	Bergamo	Sistema culturale integrato bassa pianura bergamasca		
Pinacoteca Civica di Caravaggio			Caravaggio	Bergamo	Sistema culturale integrato bassa pianura bergamasca		
Collezione Anita e Rinaldo Pigola			Romano di Lombardia	Bergamo	Sistema culturale integrato bassa pianura bergamasca		
Memoria della Comunità			Romano di Lombardia	Bergamo	Sistema culturale integrato bassa pianura bergamasca		
Donazione Mario Pozzoni			Romano di Lombardia	Bergamo	Sistema culturale integrato bassa pianura bergamasca		
Fondazione Opere Pie Riunite Giovan Battista Rubini			Romano di Lombardia	Bergamo	Sistema culturale integrato bassa pianura bergamasca		
Museo Arte Contadina			Torre Pallavicina	Bergamo	Sistema culturale integrato bassa pianura bergamasca		
Museo Civico Ernesto e Teresa Della Torre			Treviglio	Bergamo	Sistema culturale integrato bassa pianura bergamasca		
Parco Paleontologico di Cene			Cene	Bergamo	Sistema museale “Triassico.it”		
Museo Brembano di Scienze Naturali			Berbenno	Bergamo	Sistema museale “Triassico.it”		
Museo E. Caffi – Ist. Geologia			Bergamo	Bergamo	Sistema museale “Triassico.it”		
Monumento Naturale Valle Burone			San Pellegrino Terme	Bergamo	Sistema museale “Triassico.it”		
Orto Botanico "Lorenzo Rota"			Bergamo	Bergamo	Network of botanical gardens	Botanical garden	
