= Ecomuseum =

Museum focused on the identity of a place

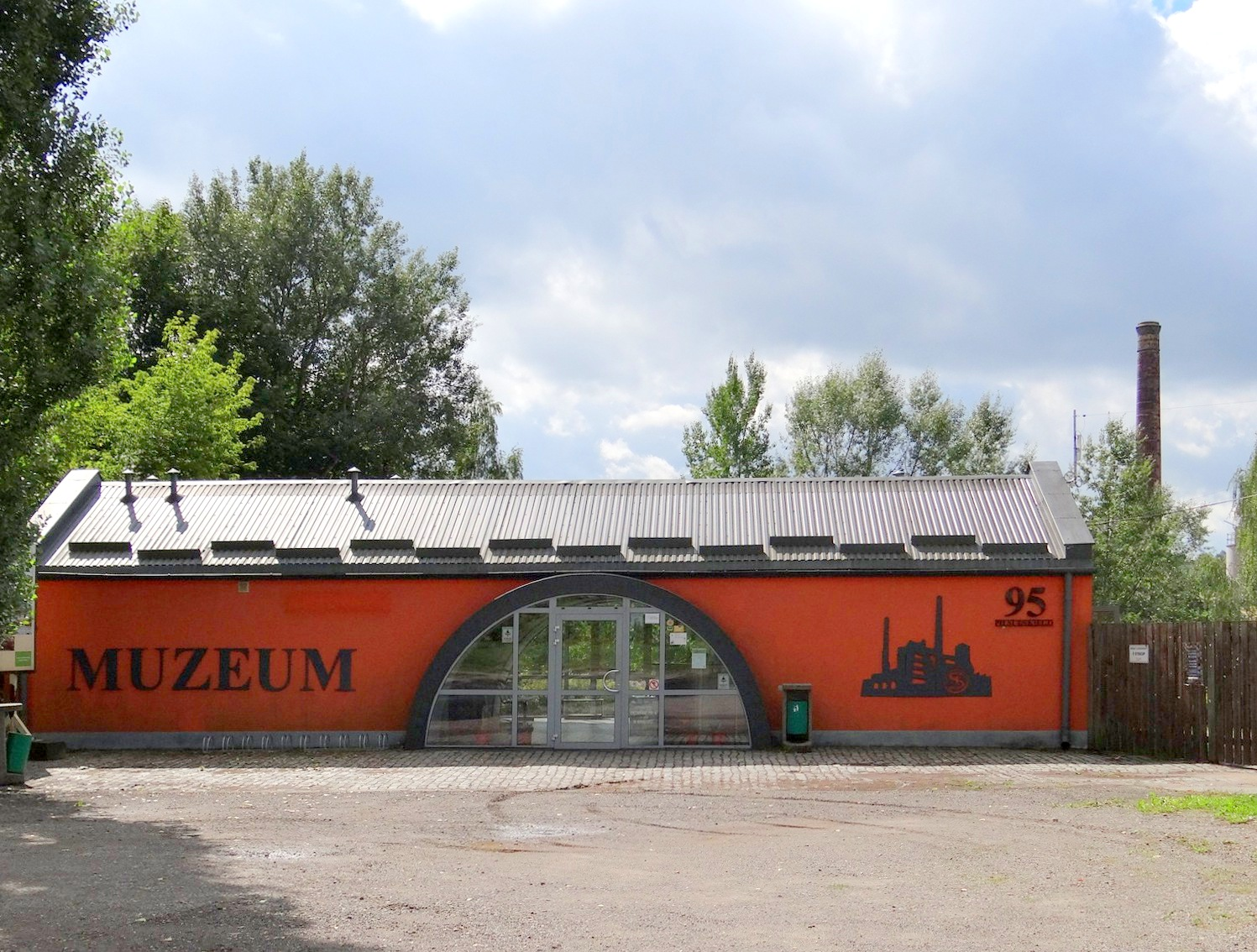
- The Museum of Nature And Technology in Starachowice, Poland, 2022
- Type: Museum
- Theorist: Georges Henri Rivière

An ecomuseum is a museum focused on the identity of a place, largely based on local participation and aiming to enhance the welfare and development of local communities. Ecomuseums originated in France, the concept being developed by Georges Henri Rivière and Hugues de Varine, who coined the term ‘ecomusée’ in 1971. The term "éco" is a shortened form for "écologie", but it refers especially to a new idea of holistic interpretation of cultural heritage, in opposition to the focus on specific items and objects, performed by traditional museums.

There are presently about 300 operating ecomuseums in the world; about 200 are in Europe, mainly in France, Italy, Spain, and Poland.

== Development ==
In the 1960s and ‘70s, a new kind of museum, known as ecomuseums, emerged throughout Europe, predominately in France. Based on belief that museums and communities should be related to the whole of life, ecomuseums focused on integrating the family home with other aspects of a community. Similar beliefs during this period helped generate neighborhood museums in the United States and Mexico. Examples include the Anacostia Community Museum in Washington, D.C., and the Casa del Museo in suburban Mexico City which served as the prototype for hundreds of ‘museos comunitarios’ throughout Mexico.

Although organized independently of each other, many of these museums were influenced by the philosophy of Rivière, a French museologist who felt museums should reflect the natural heritage as well as the local culture and distinctiveness of place.

Often created in response to external forces that held the potential for bringing radical change to an area, such as gentrification, an ecomuseum's overarching purpose was to develop a strong sense of common identity. Thus ecomuseums established a new role for museums as mediator in the process of cultural transition and the development of communities.

In 1971, during the 9th triennial Conference of the International Council of Museums (ICOM), held in Grenoble, France under the theme: The museum in the service of man: today and tomorrow, de Varine, then Secretary General of ICOM, part of the United Nations Educational, Scientific and Cultural Organization (UNESCO), coined the name “ecomuseums” (ecomusée in French). By adding 'eco', meaning 'home' in Greek, de Varine’s term eco-museum reflected the emerging concept of a 'home-museum' or a 'territory-museum'.

In 1985, the entire issue of Museum International Quarterly, the UNESCO periodical, was devoted to the ecomuseum concept. Titled Images of the Ecomuseum, the journal opened with Rivière’s article, 'Evolutive definition of the ecomuseum', followed by de Varine’s editorial, 'The word Ecomuseum and beyond'.

De Varine compared museums and ecomuseums in the following equations:

Museum = building + collections + visitors and Ecomuseums = territory + heritage + community.

This means that the three essential dimensions of a museum are radically transformed so that

- the museum building is enlarged to include the whole area where the community lives,

- the ecomuseum collections include all of the cultural heritage found in the area, and

- visitors are replaced by community members who become actors in the ecomuseum’s development.

Thus, ecomuseums differ from mainstream museums in significant ways:

First by creating a new sense of place. An ecomuseum consists of a specific geographic area, either rural or urban. It is not just a building that displays valued items even though communities often have a facility or defined space that serves as an information and activities center. For example, the Écomusée du fier monde in Montreal’s Centre-Sud has converted a large former public bath to hold its exhibitions and other cultural or community activities and to house ecomuseum offices.

The second way ecomuseums differed from traditional museums is in the role of the people who live in the area and share a common culture. Residents define the community’s collections, not outside experts, and take responsibility for their care.

Collections include intangible heritage such as traditional lifestyles, local skills and oral history, shared experiences and values, as well as tangible heritage such as important sites and buildings and archival materials. Usually collections are not gathered together inside a museum building but held in situ. Community members learn the proper ways of taking care of objects and ways for developing schematic exhibitions and activities through various workshops and internship opportunities.

The ecomuseum concept was promoted in North America through the efforts of René Rivard, a Canadian museologist, and Pierre Mayrand, a professor at the Université du Québec à Montréal who helped the people of 12 villages located in a remote area of south-eastern Quebec to create the Haute-Beauce Ecomuseum.

In 1984, in Haute-Beauce (Beauce, Quebec), Rivard and Mayrand hosted the first international gathering of ecomuseologists. More than fifty ecomuseum curators and field-staff from France, Germany, Mexico, Norway, Portugal, Spain, Sweden, Switzerland and the United States participated in the conference. The meeting resulted in the founding of the International Movement for New Museology or MINOM (Movement International pour une NOuvelle Museologie). In subsequent years these gatherings were repeated in France, Norway, Portugal and Spain.

In 1991, following a five-year educational program guided by the Smithsonian Institution’s Center for Museum Studies, along with René Rivard, Shayne del Cohen and other consultants, the first ecomuseum in the United States opened at the Ak-Chin Indian Community in Maricopa, Arizona. Called Him Dak (translated from O’odham as ‘Our Way’), the museum became a community education center that prompted the study of Ak-Chin prehistoric presence in the Sonora Desert and of their endeavors to develop in this arid environment.

The ecomuseum phenomenon has grown dramatically over the years, with no one ecomuseum model but rather an entire philosophy that has been adapted and molded for use in a variety of situations. Many museologists have sought to define the distinctive features of ecomuseums, listing their characteristics. As many more ecomuseums are established across the world the idea has been growing and the changes in the approach towards the philosophy are reflected in the reactions of the communities involved. In recent time particular significance is the rise in ecomuseology in India, China, Taiwan, Japan, Thailand, Vietnam and Cambodia, with significant increase in Italy, Poland, the Czech Republic and Turkey.

Ecomuseums are an important medium through which a community can take control of its heritage and enable new approaches to make meaning out of conserving its local distinctiveness.

== Definition from the European Network of Ecomuseums ==
An Ecomuseum is a dynamic way in which communities preserve, interpret, and manage their heritage for a sustainable development. An Ecomuseum is based on a community agreement.

— Declaration of Intent of the Long Net Workshop, Trento (Italy), May 2004

Dynamic way means to go beyond the formal aspect of an ecomuseum, beyond a simple set course, designed on paper; it is about designing real actions, able to change our society and improve our landscape. Community means a group with:

- General involvement;
- Shared responsibilities;
- Interchangeable roles: public officers, representatives, volunteers and other local actors are all playing a vital role in an ecomuseum.

Community involvement does not mean that local administrations, a unique historical heritage of European democracy, are irrelevant. On the contrary their role, to be effective, must involve people, going beyond the narrow circle of “authorized personnel”.

Preservation, interpretation and management means that reading and communicating heritage values, providing new interpretations of it and raising its profile, are part of the day-to-day activity for ecomuseums. Heritage is very close to Place as a notion, including history of inhabitants and things, what is visible and what it is not, tangibles and intangibles, memories and future.

Sustainable development is a central issue for ecomuseums and it implies also to increase the value of a place instead of diminishing it. Evidence from best practices identifies in this process two key elements: place-based development, as previously described, and the improvement of local networks, where ecomuseums have to play a key role as catalysts of social capital development.

Agreement means a mutual consent, implying reciprocal commitments between local players. The Polish national meeting, once more, put forward the idea of “voluntary meeting of people”.

== The 2016 Milan Cooperation Charter ==
In 2016 inside the 24th ICOM General Conference Museums and cultural landscape of Milan, the first Forum of ecomuseums and community museums took place. The goals of the forum were to share experiences, questions and difficulties that ecomuseums face; to share their future projects; to envisage any prospect of exchange or collaboration with the visitors. During the Forum "it was proposed to establish an International Platform for exchanges and experience sharing", and "decided to create a permanent international Working Group to keep watch and make proposals on the theme territory-heritage-landscape."

In the early 2017 on the basis of ideas, issues and debates raised by participants during the Forum a common vision was drawn and a provisional “Milan Cooperation Charter” was adopted.

== The DROPS Platform ==
In the early 2017 the world platform for exchange and experience sharing between ecomuseums and community museums was published. The platform called DROPS aims at “connecting all national Ecomuseums and Community Museums and their networks, existing or to be established, and all other heritage and landscape NGOs, in a virtual and interactive space” and at the “production of a multilingual documentary and a bibliographic pool of resources on ecomuseology and its best practices”.

== See also ==
- Cultural landscape
- Ecotourism
- List of ecomuseums
- Patrick Geddes, Francophile and visionnaire
- Ecomuseums and Community Museums
