= Leon =

Leon, Léon (French) or León (Spanish) may refer to:

== Places ==
=== Europe ===
- León, Spain, capital city of the Province of León
- Province of León, Spain
- Kingdom of León, an independent state in the Iberian Peninsula from 910 to 1230 and again from 1296 to 1301
- Region of León, composed of the Spanish provinces León, Salamanca, and Zamora
- Viscounty of Léon, a feudal state in France during the 11th to 13th centuries
- Saint-Pol-de-Léon, a commune in Brittany, France
- Léon, Landes, a commune in Aquitaine, France
- Isla de León, a Spanish island
- Leon (Souda Bay), an islet in Souda Bay, Chania, on the island of Crete

=== North America ===
- León, Guanajuato, Mexico, a large city
- Leon, California, United States, a ghost town
- Leon, Iowa, United States
- Leon, Kansas, United States
- Leon, New York, United States
- Leon, Oklahoma, United States
- Leon, West Virginia, United States
- Leon, Wisconsin (disambiguation), United States, several places
- New Kingdom of León, a territory of Spain (1582-1821) in Mexico, roughly corresponding in area to modern Nuevo León
- Leon County, Florida
- Leon County, Texas
- Leon Township, Clearwater County, Minnesota
- Leon Township, Goodhue County, Minnesota
- Leon River, Texas

=== Central America ===
- León Department, Nicaragua
- León, Nicaragua, capital city of the León Department

=== Other places ===
- León, Jujuy, Argentina
- Leon, Iloilo, Philippines, a 2nd class municipality
- Leon, Togo, a village
- Leon River (Colombia)

== People ==
=== People with the nickname or stage name ===
- Leon (Japanese wrestler), (born 1980), Japanese professional wrestler
- Leon Robinson (born 1962), African-American actor and singer usually credited as "Leon"
- Leon (German singer) (born 1969), German performer in the 1996 Eurovision Song Contest
- Léon (Swedish singer) (born 1993), Swedish singer
- El León (born 1975), Puerto Rican professional wrestler
- Frère León (1871–1955), Franco-Cuban botanist, born Joseph Sylvestre Sauget, known by the botanical author abbreviation León
- Leon Boga, nickname of Aromanian writer, schoolteacher and archivist in Romania Leonida T. Boga (1886–1974)
- Leon Russell (1942–2016), American singer and songwriter

=== People with the name ===
- Leon (given name), people whose first name is Leon
- Leon (surname)

== Arts and entertainment ==
=== Fictional characters ===
- Leon (Squirrel Boy)
- Leon, a character on The Andy Griffith Show

==== Video Games ====
- Leon S. Kennedy, a character from the Resident Evil franchise
- Squall Leonhart, aka Leon, a character from the Final Fantasy franchise
- Leon Kuwata, a character from the Danganronpa franchise
- Leon, a character in the mobile video games, Brawl Stars and Squad Busters

=== Works ===
- Leon (TV series), an animated TV series for children
- Léon: The Professional, a 1994 thriller film directed by Luc Besson
- Léon (album), a 2019 album by Swedish singer-songwriter Léon
- Leon (Leon Bridges album), a 2024 album by Leon Bridges
- "Leon", a song on the album Oui Oui Si Si Ja Ja Da Da by Madness
- "Leon", a song on the album I Thought I Was Better Than You by Baxter Dury and featuring JGrrey

== Businesses ==
- Léon & Lévy, French maker of stereoscopic views and postcards, founded 1864
- Leon Restaurants, fast food chain based in the United Kingdom
- Leon's, a Canadian furniture retailer

== Ships ==
- Greek destroyer Leon (1912)
- Greek destroyer Leon (D54) (1951–1992)
- USS Leon (APA-48), a World War II attack transport

== Sports clubs ==
- Club León, Mexican professional football club from León, Guanajuato
- León de Huánuco, Peruvian professional football club from Huánuco, Huánuco Region

== Technology ==
- Leon (software), a vocal for Vocaloid software
- LEON, a microprocessor
- SEAT León, a car from the Spanish manufacturer SEAT
  - Cupra León, a variant marketed under the Cupra marque

== See also ==
- De León (disambiguation)
- Leon Airport (disambiguation)
- Winter Storm Leon
- Kings of Leon, American rock band
- Leonard (disambiguation)
- Leno (disambiguation)
