= Leno (disambiguation) =

Jay Leno (born 1950) is an American comedian and talk show host.

Leno or Leño may also refer to:

- Leno, a stock character in theatre of ancient Rome who is a slave dealer or pimp
- Leno (surname)
- Leno, Lombardy, Italy, a town and comune
- Leno (singer) (1949–2022), Brazilian singer
- Leno (stream), a stream in Italy
- Leno weave, a pattern in weaving
- Leño, a Spanish hard rock band from 1978 to 1983
- Leño (album) (1979)

== See also ==
- Lenno, a former comune in the province of Como, Italy, now part of Tremezzina
