= Leon, Wisconsin =

Leon is the name of places in the U.S. state of Wisconsin:

- Leon (community), Wisconsin, an unincorporated community
- Leon, Monroe County, Wisconsin, a town
- Leon, Waushara County, Wisconsin, a town
