= Madonna and Child with Saint Martin and Saint Catherine =

c. 1530 painting by Moretto da Brescia

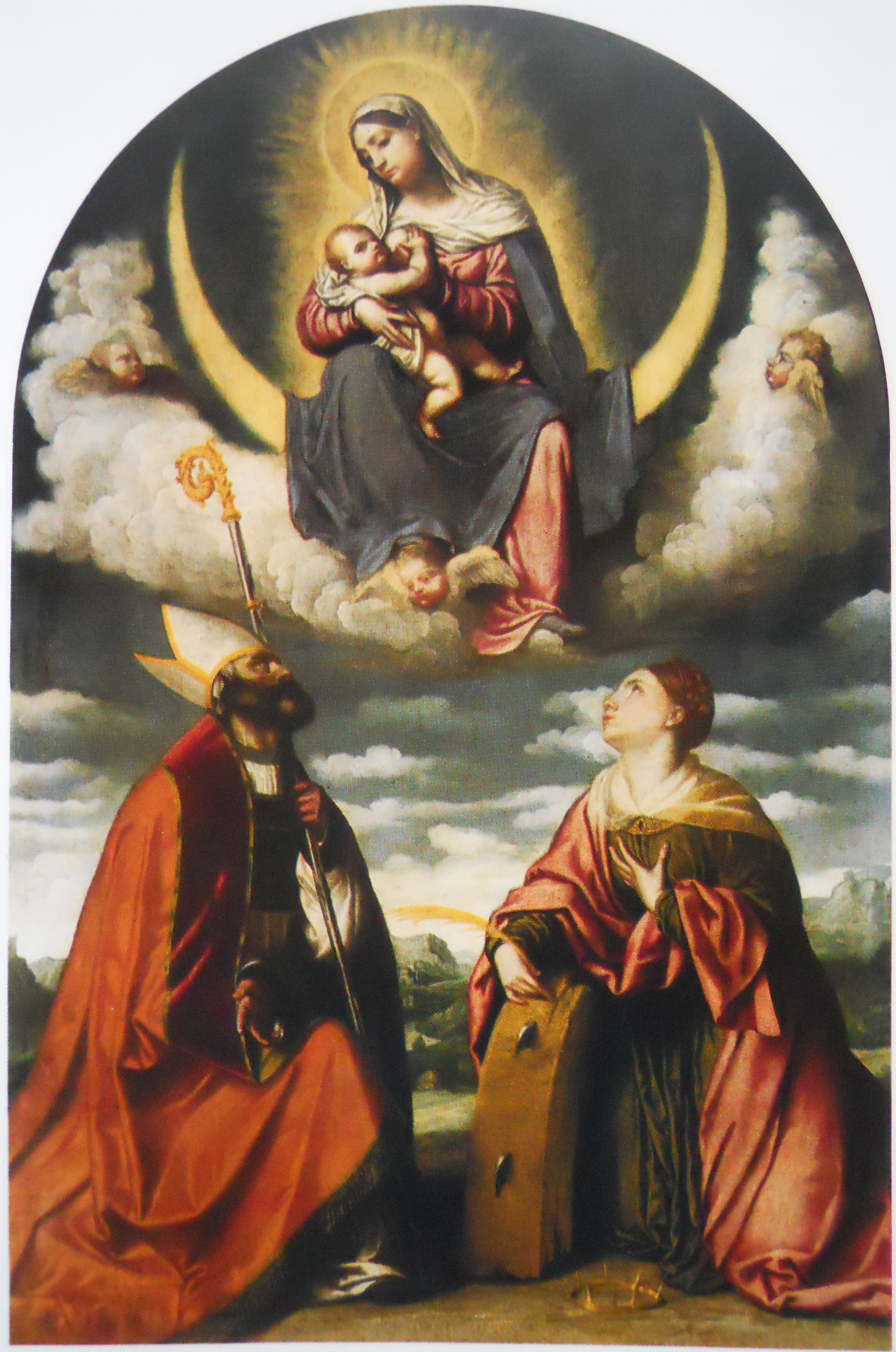
Madonna and Child with Saint Martin and Saint Catherine (c. 1530) by Moretto da Brescia

Madonna and Child with Saint Martin and Saint Catherine is an oil on canvas painting by Moretto da Brescia, executed c. 1530, now on the high altar in the church of San Martino in Porzano, Province of Brescia. It is the painter's first mature work and forms an important step towards his Coronation of the Virgin Altarpiece.
