= Pine River, Waushara County, Wisconsin =

Census-designated place in Wisconsin, United States

Pine River
- Census-designated place
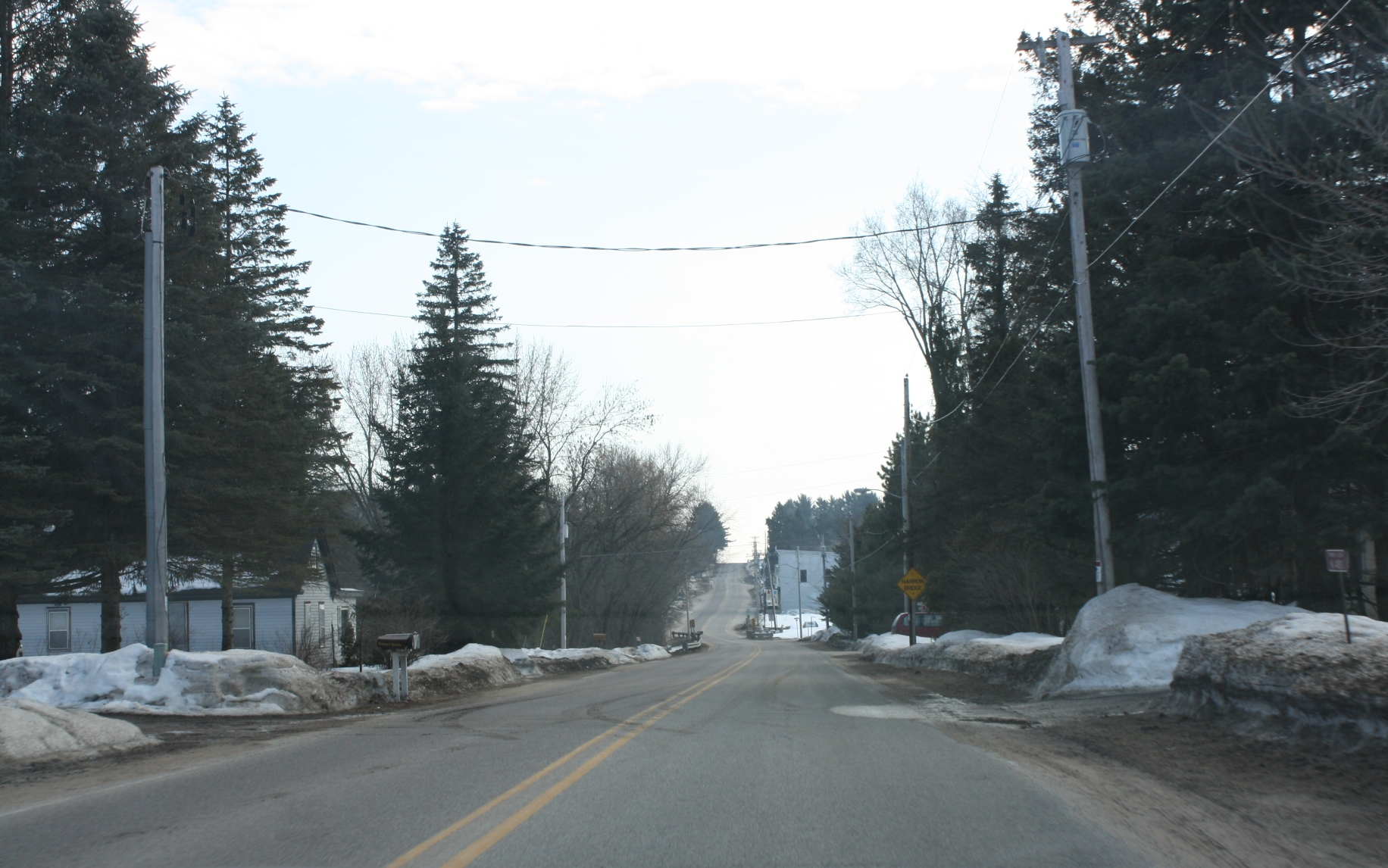
- Looking south at Pine River
- Interactive map of Pine River
- Coordinates: 44°09′08″N 89°04′37″W
- Country: United States
- State: Wisconsin
- County: Waushara

Area
  - Total: 1.182 sq mi (3.06 km^{2})
  - Land: 1.168 sq mi (3.03 km^{2})
  - Water: 0.014 sq mi (0.036 km^{2})
- Elevation: 833 ft (254 m)

Population (2020)
  - Total: 144
  - Density: 123/sq mi (47.6/km^{2})
- Time zone: UTC-6 (Central (CST))
  - Summer (DST): UTC-5 (CDT)
- GNIS feature ID: 2586543

Pine River is a census-designated place in Waushara County, Wisconsin, United States. The community is located at the intersection of County H and County E, in the town of Leon. As of the 2010 census, its population is 147.

== Notable people ==
- Alanson M. Kimball, Wisconsin politician
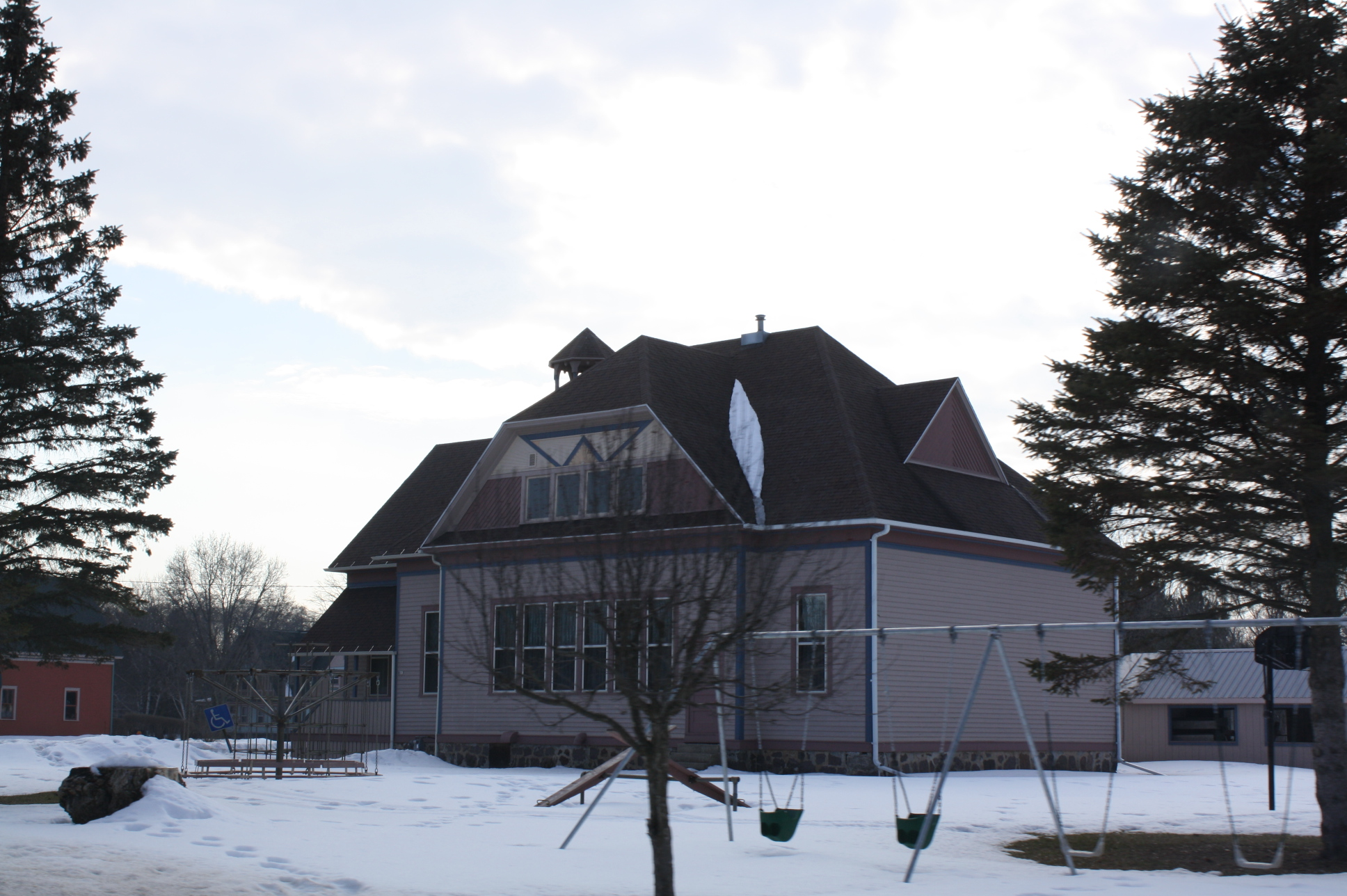
Leon town hall in Pine River

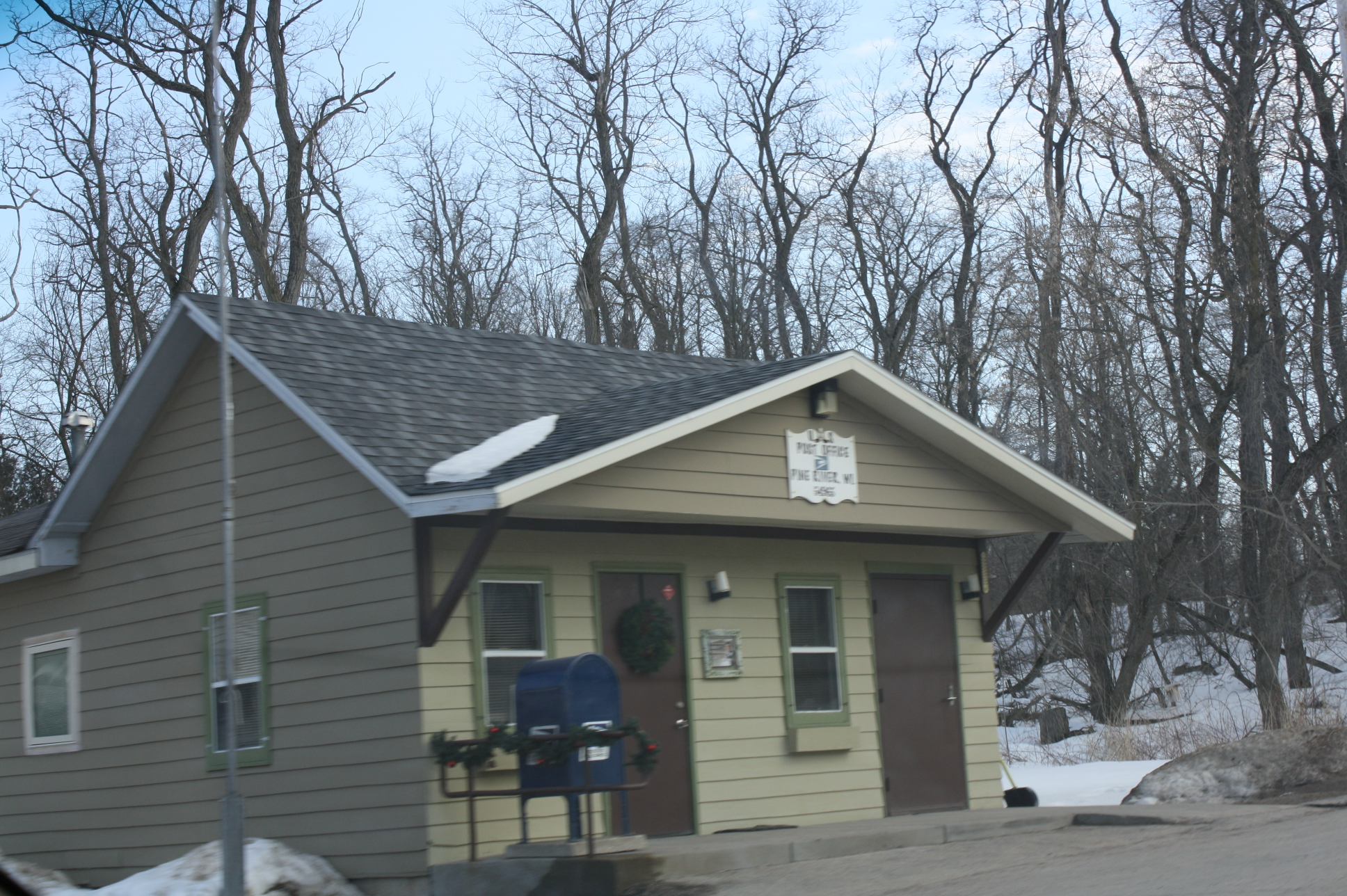
Post office

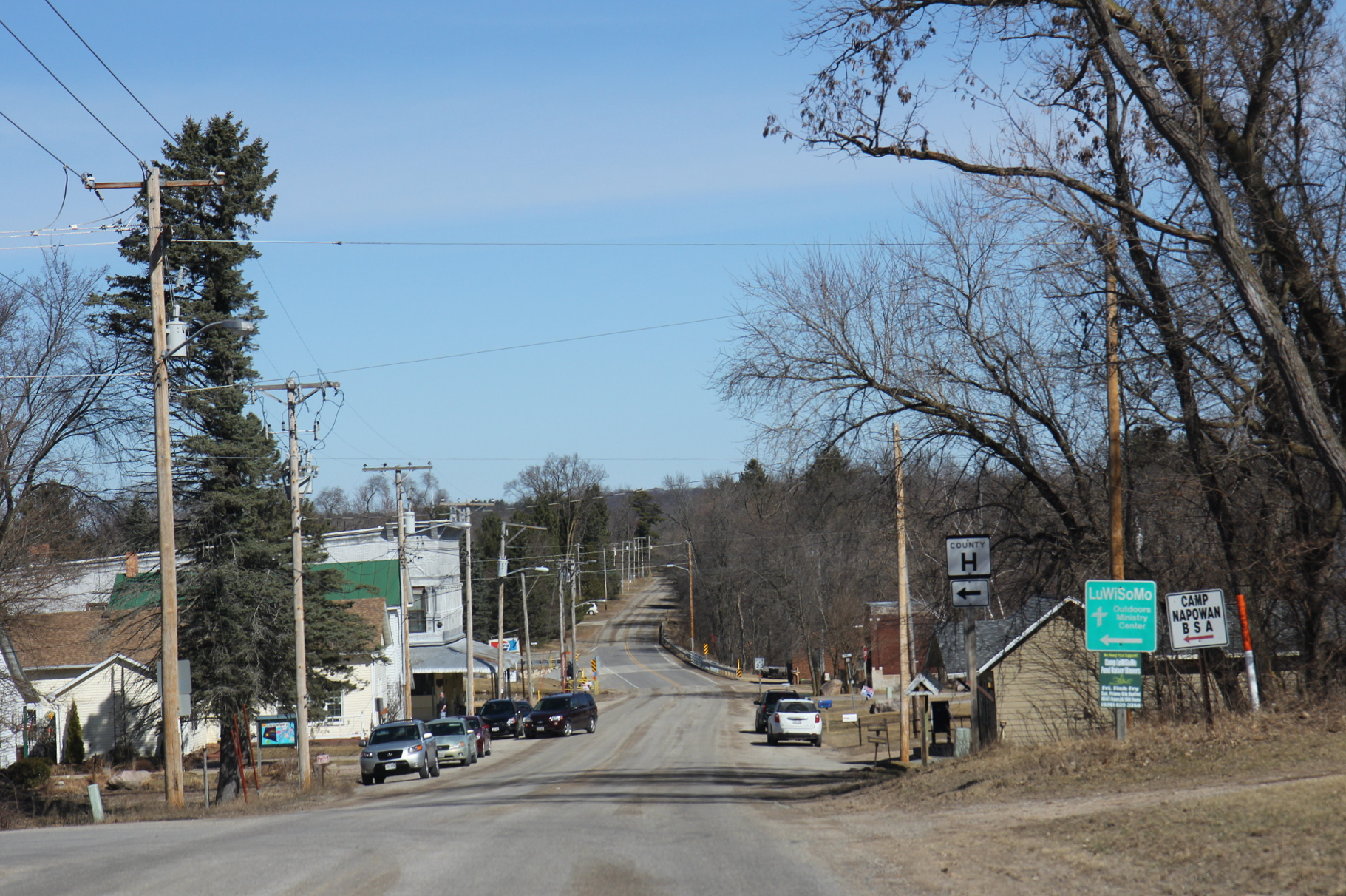
Looking north at Pine River on County H

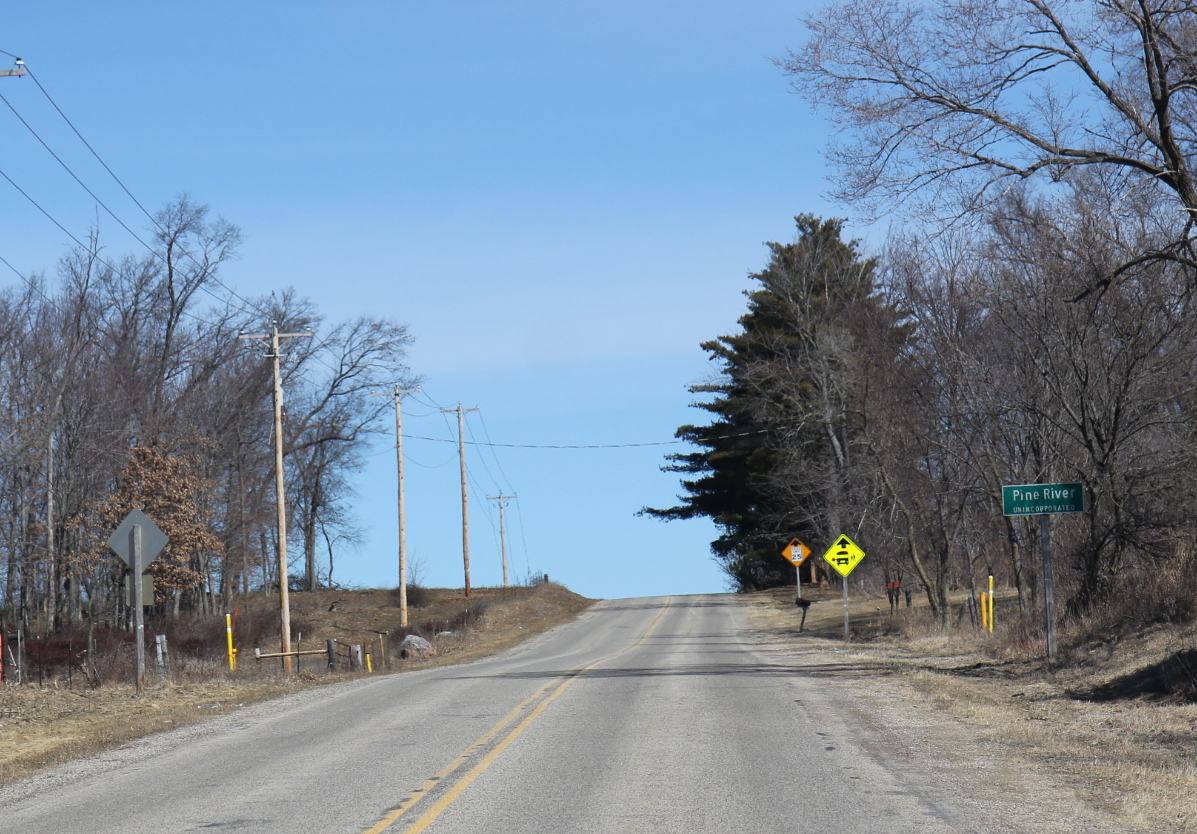
Sign on County H

== See also ==
- List of census-designated places in Wisconsin
