= Abbey of Leno =

Benedictine monastic complex in Leno, Italy

- Abbazia di Leno
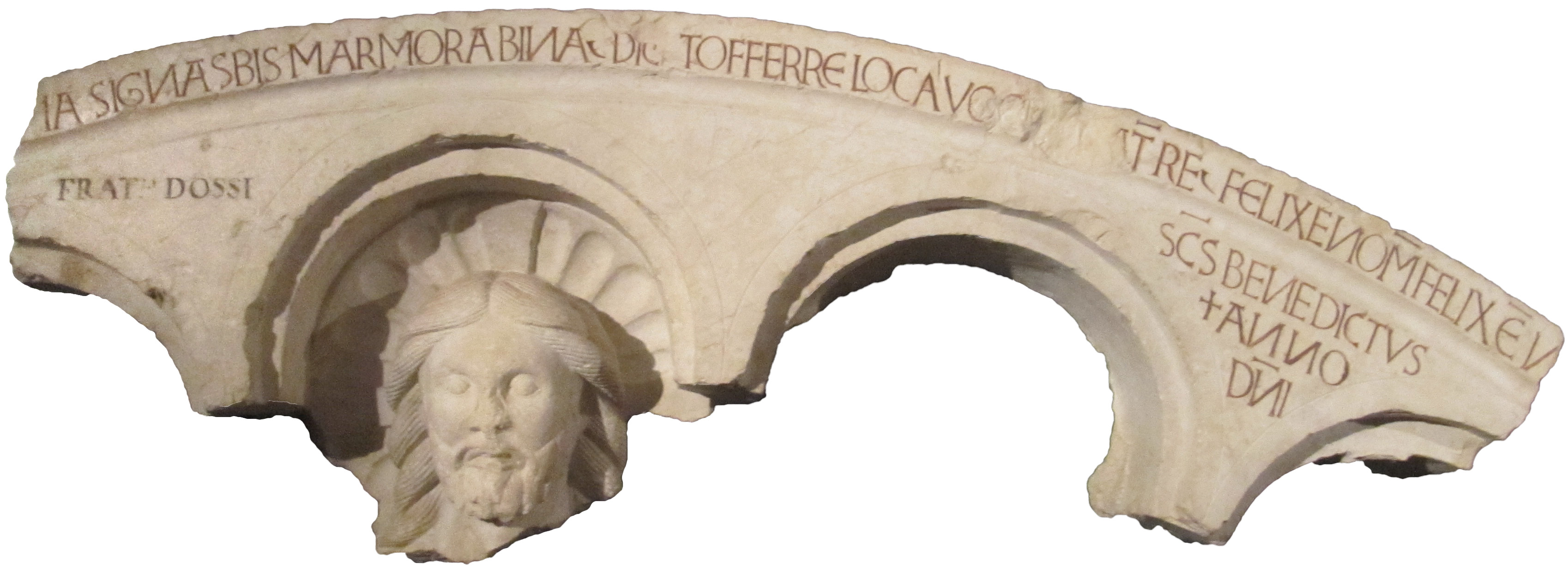
- Fragment of the portal of the 12th-century abbey church, currently kept at the Santa Giulia Museum in Brescia
- Abbey of Leno
- 45.36742°N 10.221067°E
- Location: Leno, Lombardy, Italy
- Religious institute: Order of Saint Benedict

Architecture
- Groundbreaking: 8th century
- Completed: 11th century
- Demolished: 1783

Administration
- Diocese: Roman Catholic Diocese of Brescia

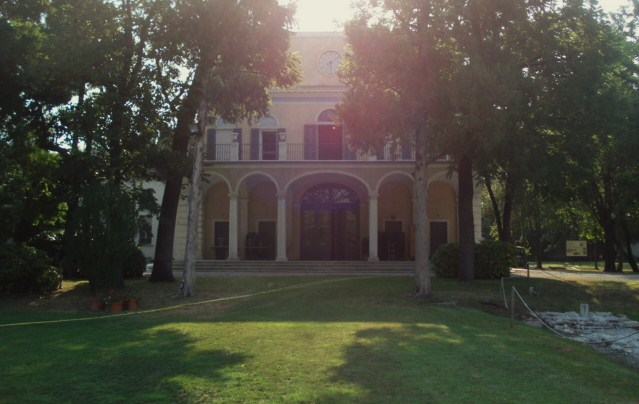
Overall view of the archaeological site of Villa Badia, which stands where the abbey once stood

The Abbey of Leno, or Badia leonense, was an ancient Benedictine monastic complex founded in 758 by the Lombard king Desiderius in the territory of the present-day town of Leno, in the Lower Brescian region. It was demolished by order of the Vicinia of Leno in 1783, with authorization from the Senate of Venice, so that the materials could be used in the construction of the new parish church and the villa of the Dossi family. Today only stone fragments of the ancient abbey remain, largely preserved in the Brescian museum of Santa Giulia, while burial mounds were found on site as a result of archaeological excavations held in 2003 by the Superintendence for Archaeological Heritage of Lombardy.

== History ==
Locum ad Leones

Since its founding, the Leno monastery was called ad Leones, an appellation that according to tradition was derived from a dream of King Desiderius. Legend has it that the then Lombard duke, tired after a strenuous hunt in a marshy area near Leno, fell asleep. A snake, coming out of nowhere, crawled up beside him and went to coil around his head. The valet escorting the duke did not wake him up, fearing that if he did, the duke would become agitated and the beast might bite him; shortly afterward the snake departed. When Desiderius awoke, he told the servant that he had dreamed of a situation similar to what had actually happened to him. In the dream, however, the snake had shown him a particular place; the servant then pointed to the spot where the reptile had taken refuge. The two began digging at that spot and found three golden, or marble lions according to other sources.

From this episode would derive the adjective leonense that would characterize the abbey later erected there by Desiderius, once he became king.

According to Jacopo (or Giacomo) Malvezzi, the foundation of the monastery would derive, not from the discovery of lion statues, but from a dream, which occurred to Desiderius near Leno during a hunting trip, in which his future coronation as king of the Lombards was foretold.

The monastery arose in the 8th century, at a time when Italian monasticism was flourishing. The monks who lived there were specially brought in from Montecassino so that they could spread the Benedictine rule in that area as well. The abbots were bestowed with numerous royal and papal concessions that increased the prestige of the Lenese monastery during the Middle Ages and made it an important cultural, economic, religious and, for the surrounding municipalities, political center. The abbey reached the peak of its development in the 11th century, which was followed by a gradual decline of the monastic complex and its prestige.

With the introduction of the commendation in 1479, a second period of the monastery's existence began, characterized by the new type of jurisdiction of the commendatory abbots, but which nonetheless saw the continuation of the downward spiral that would stop only in 1783, the year of the demolition of the monastic complex.

Over the centuries, the abbey church as well as the monastery itself were rebuilt several times following fires and other serious damage endured, with the result that its architectural structure became increasingly distant from the original Desiderian one.

=== Origins ===
The years preceding the foundation of the Leno monastery were marked by the struggle for the Lombard throne, sparked by the death of Aistulf, between Desiderius, duke of Tuscia, and Ratchis, Aistulf's brother. The duke, at first at a disadvantage, sought the support of the Franks and the papacy by promising the latter territories in Emilia and the Marches. To endear himself even more to the Papal State, he promoted important monastic initiatives, especially in the North, allocating large amounts of money to the various monastic orders and also founding new religious buildings, as in the case of the Abbey of San Benedetto in Leno and the monastery of Santa Giulia in Brescia.

The Abbey of Leno would have sprung up on the site of the town of the same name, which had begun to be established thanks mainly to the building of a parish church, dedicated to the Baptist; the construction work ended shortly after the accession to the throne of Desiderius (758), who, in addition to attending the inauguration ceremony in the company of his consort and a large group of bishops, provided it with a substantial real estate patrimony, which included property scattered throughout eastern Lombardy, on Lake Como and 58 towns or fiefdoms (including San Martino dall'Argine) located in the Brescia, Cremona, Milan and Mantua areas.

The monastery was built next to a pre-existing church, dedicated to the Savior, the Virgin Mary and the Archangel Michael, in which the friars would officiate masses and preserve relics. These, which had been brought to the Brescia area by a group of twelve monks, initiators of the Lenese monastic experience and coming directly from Monte Cassino, included the radium of the order's initiating saint, Benedict, and the remains of Saints Vitalis and Martialis, donated by the pope to Desiderius and donated by him to the new monastery.

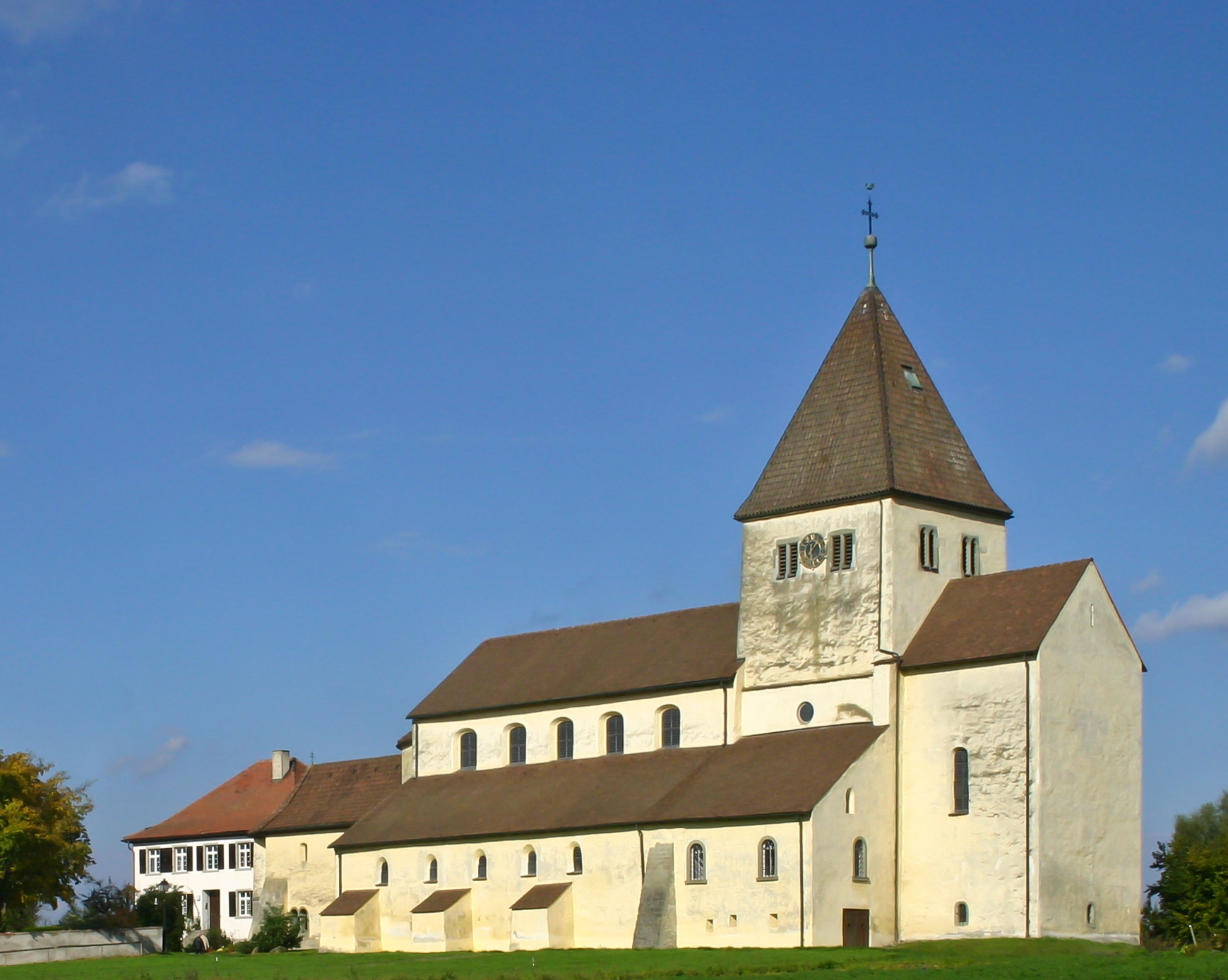
The German monastery of Reichenau, with which the Leno abbey maintained contact

In 774, upon the collapse of Lombard hegemony in Italy at the hands of the Franks, the monastery experienced moments of concern over the demise of the founding monarch, but it was soon realized that the foreign king, Charlemagne, as defender of Christianity had every interest in preserving the integrity of the monastic entities, so much so that he granted the abbots of Leno control over the court, now Mantuan, of Sabbioneta. Over the years the real estate of the monastery grew more and more not only through donations made by people close to the imperial court, but also and especially through bequests from private individuals. Already at the beginning of the ninth century, the Abbey of Leno appeared to be linked by economic and spiritual relations to the far more famous transalpine one of Reichenau, located near Constance, and was soon elevated to the rank of imperial abbey, as evidenced by the appointment of Abbot Remigio as arch-chancellor to Emperor Louis II.

The same ruler, by the explicit intervention of his official abbot, reconfirmed to the Benedictine community the property bestowed by its ancestors, exempted it from paying taxes, and decreed that the brethren could directly elect the rector of the abbey, collect and withhold tax levies from their landed estates; the diploma also provided that no man outside the abbot could judge a resident in the monastery's domains.

=== Splendor ===
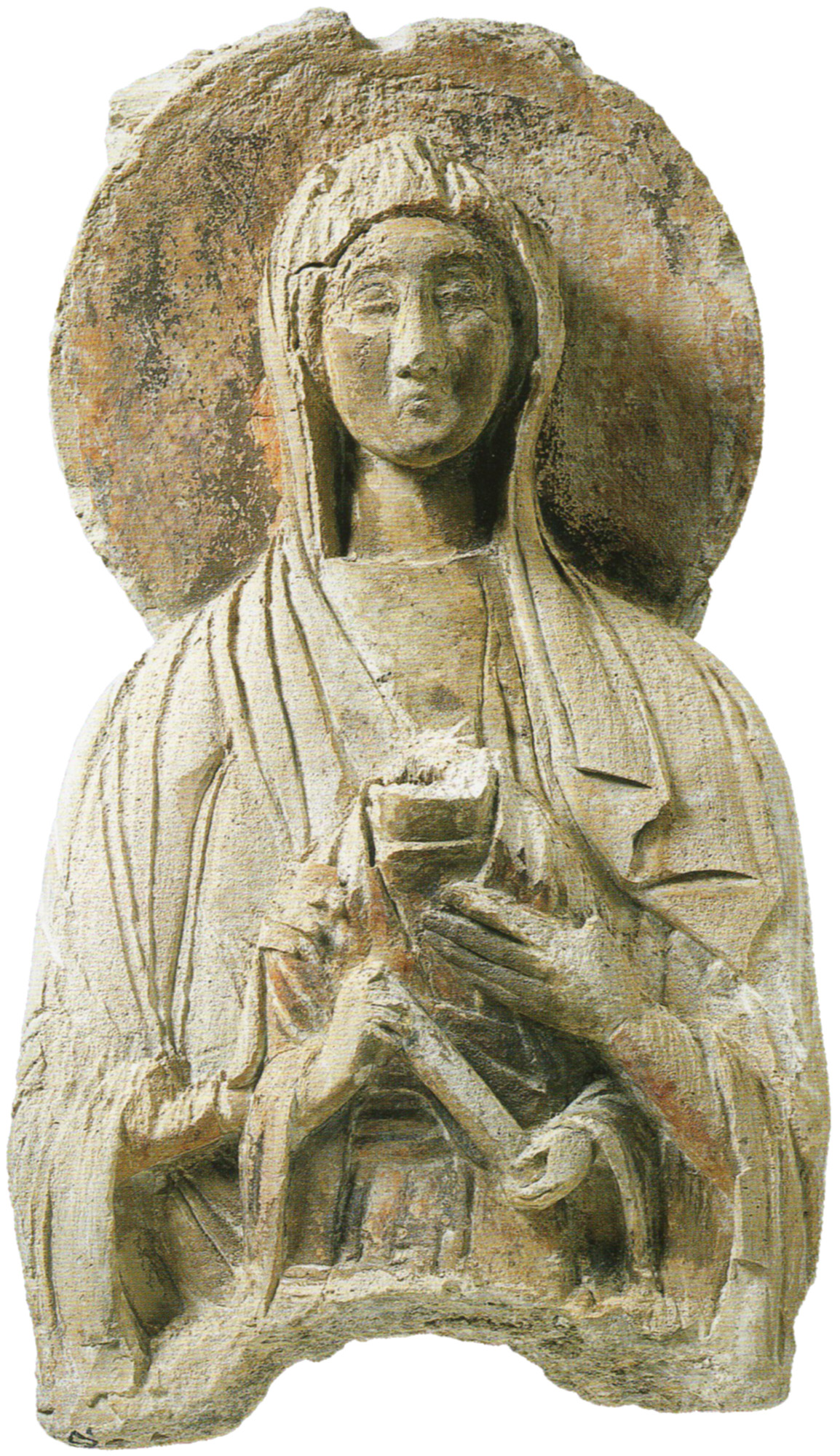
Virgin Theotokos from the Carolingian stuccoes of the Santa Giulia Museum, possibly from Leno Abbey, now on display at the Santa Giulia Museum in Brescia

In the 10th century, marked by the repeated incursions of the Hungarians into Italy, the monks of Leno ensured that the area around the abbey was fortified with palisades and towers and girdled the curtis of Gottolengo. In 938 the monastery's possessions were further expanded with the inclusion of Gambara. Twenty years later, with the diplomas of Berengar II and Adalbert II, the vast Benedictine possessions ranged from the province of Verona to the Comacchio Valleys and from the Modena area to the Brescian area. The list of possessions also included curtis Bonzaga, today's Gonzaga in the province of Mantua.

In 983 there was the first occupation of the monastery by a band of local brigands, who were driven back by the intervention of Otto III. In 999 the first papal bull, that of Sylvester II, was issued, granting the monastery the regime of libertas, already established in previous royal and imperial provisions, enriched the possessions by including the court of Panzano, and confirmed the abbot's right to appeal to any bishop, thus avoiding recourse to the Brescian diocese for the consecration of the chrism and monks.

The 11th century was the abbey's heyday. In 1014, Henry II's diploma represented for the monastery of St. Benedetto the largest list of possessions ever recorded, with estates scattered over as many as ninety-five localities throughout the northern region. Five years later Abbot Odone incorporated the reformed rules of the Cluniacs, who were also spreading in the Brescian area at that time, as evidenced by the building of the Abbey of Rodengo-Saiano in the middle of the century.

In 1030, disagreements with the Brescia cathedra began to escalate because of the bishop's attempts to substitute himself for the spiritual and later also the temporal jurisdiction of the abbot. The abbey was ruled from 1035 to 1075 by two Bavarian monks from Niederalteich, who enlarged the Desiderian church and reaffirmed the role of the monastery at the expense of the diocese. In 1078 Pope Gregory VII forbade any layman to take possession of the monastery and administer the lands without the abbot's permission, and also confirmed the fiscal and religious privileges and prerogatives of the brethren.

The ecclesiastical jurisdiction of the wealthy Abbey of Leno apparently extended beyond the boundaries of its own territory and came, around 1107, to include the Benedictine monastery of St. Thomas the Apostle in Acquanegra, a territory located between the Chiese and the Oglio, which the monks had reclaimed.

=== Decadence ===
In the following century began the downward spiral of the Benedictine monastery, a process that would lead to its cession in commendam in the late 15th century. After a period of relative quiet, around 1135 the monastery was destroyed by a fire, presumably caused by arson. In 1144 there is a record of interference by the Brescian diocese in the affairs of the abbey, when the cathedra installed one of its provosts in the parish of Gambara, at the time directly dependent on the abbot of Leno. The issue regarding the control of the Gambara see would only come to an end in 1195, following a trial with outcomes that were not explicitly favorable to either side, but substantially to the advantage of the bishop of Brescia.

In 1145 the brethren completed the work of repairing the damage caused by the fire, while it seems that during 1148 Pope Eugene III stayed at length in the monastery, a fact in which it is possible to glimpse an attempt by Abbot Onesto to reaffirm the role of the monastery. The papal measure of Adrian VI (1156), which restored prestige to the abbey at the expense of the Brescian diocese and attributed important privileges to the abbots, is also part of this revival.

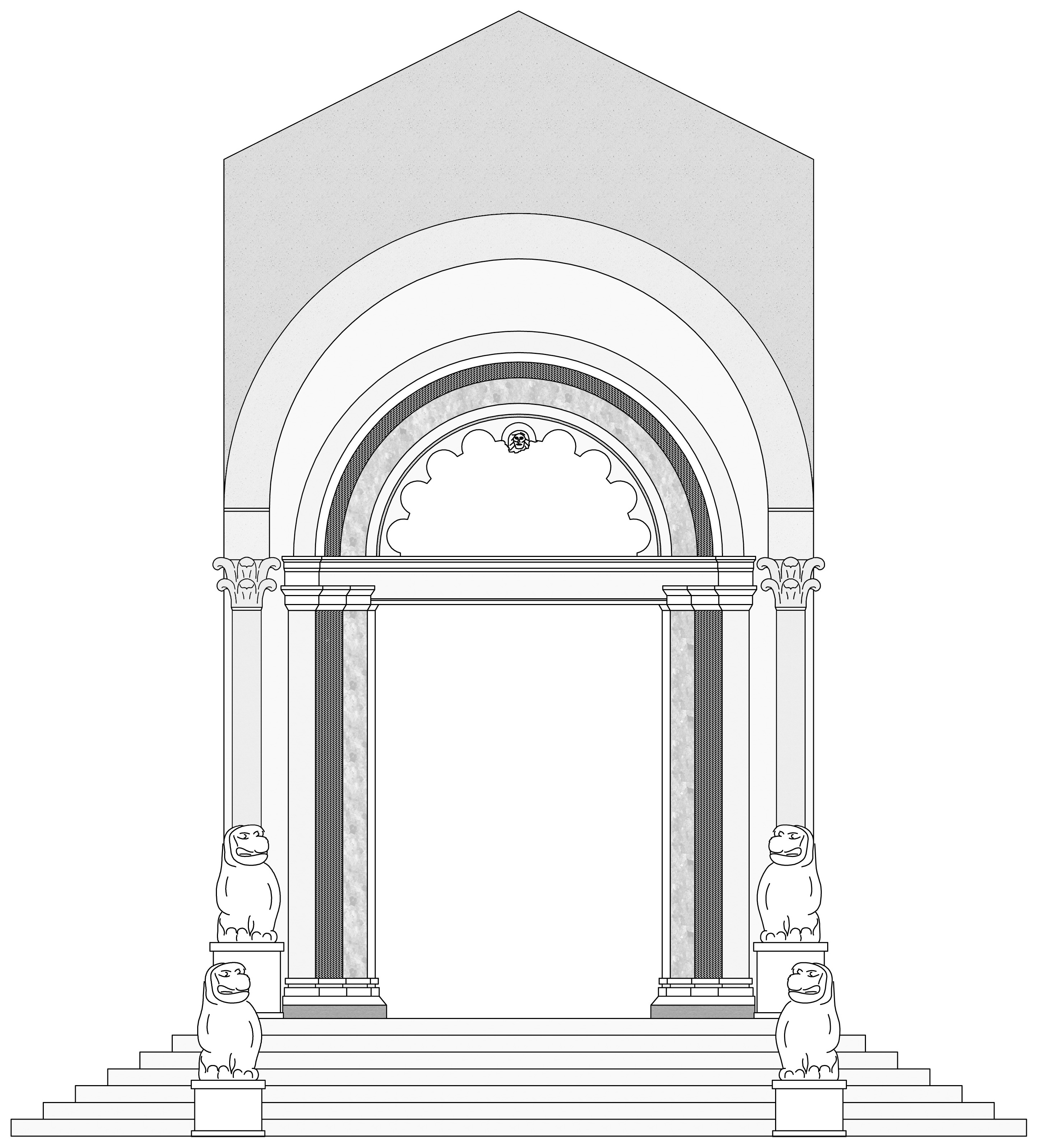
Reconstruction of the main portal of the abbey church carved in the 12th century during Gonterio's reconstruction

Meanwhile, the fragmentation of the abbatial dominatus gradually began to materialize with the transmission of administrative power over a variety of conspicuous properties in the north to numerous feudal lords; the first communal entities that were becoming established around the monastery, including Gottolengo, Gambara, Ghedi (1196), as well as Leno itself, were instead making their first claims for autonomy from the abbey's jurisdiction. For nearly two decades the monastery, which was also burned, endured the military campaigns of Frederick Barbarossa, but the latter, at the end of his clashes with the municipalities of the Lombard League, granted the monks, who had sided with him, an important diploma, an ephemeral reconfirmation of the monastery's power.

In the meantime, the contrast between the Brescian diocese and the Lenese abbey was sharpening: an emblematic testimony of this real perpetual clash between the cathedral and the abbey over the control of tithes and the jurisdiction of rural churches is placed in this period, at the end of the 12th century. It is a judicial deposition of Montenario, canon of the abbey in those years, reported in Dell'antichissima badia di Leno published in 1767 by Francesco Antonio Zaccaria, of which, however, the original has not survived. Montenario, referring to his own monastery, says:

I never heard that the church of Leno was subject to the bishop of Brescia or that it had been baptized under his authority. Once, however, I went to the synod of the Church of Brescia with my master Martino [of San Genesio], and on that occasion I heard that it was called "parish of Leno" when the priest Martino read the list in which the parishes of the Church of Brescia were recorded. Upon hearing those words, however, as if suddenly disturbed, vicedominus Giovanni exclaimed, "God help us! Will this foolishness ever end? From the time that lasts now only dogs return there!"

— Francesco Antonio Zaccaria, Dell'antichissima badia di Leno, Venezia 1767, p. 178

It can be deduced from the testimony how, for the community of Leno, it was considered an affront to call the abbey a "parish church", on the strength of its independence from the diocese constantly confirmed by popes and emperors. The 12th century ended with the rectorate of Gonterio, a man trusted by the emperor, who carried out a total reconstruction of the abbey church in an attempt to reaffirm the prestige of the Order in Leno.

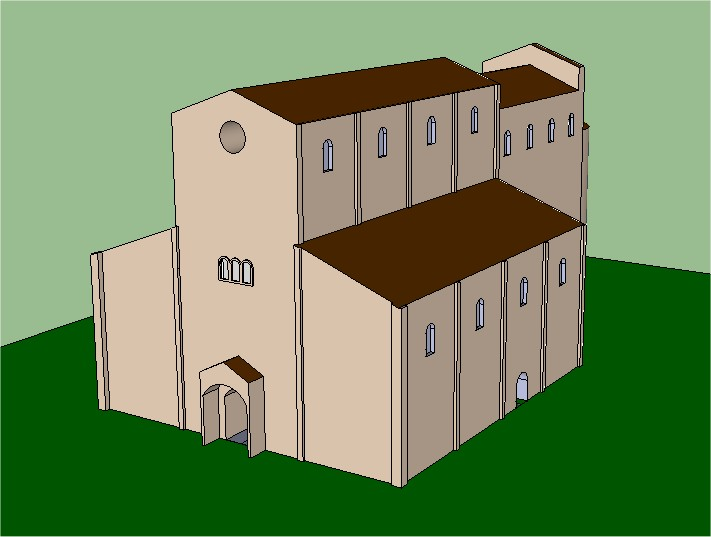
Reconstruction of the possible appearance of the church as reconstructed by Gonterio

The thirteenth century opened dramatically with an uprising of the people of Leno, who succeeded in seizing the monastery by driving out the monks, who, however, managed by force of arms to regain it in 1209. In the same year, Abbot Onesto decided to build a new hospital, dedicated to St. Bartholomew and St. Anthony, run by the Benedictines, for the use of the community. Numerous land sales were implemented to deal with economic debts, and in 1212 the Holy See delegated the bishop of Cremona, Sicardo, as curator of the economic affairs of the Leno monastery.

There followed Epifanio's long abbacy, which left not only the finances but also the abbey's books and sacred objects in such a deplorable state that the pope had to intervene and deposed him in the 1330s. In the following years, characterized by the struggle between the Guelphs and Ghibellines, the abbots of Leno sided sometimes on one side and sometimes on the other, accentuating more and more the misery of the monastic community, which increasingly resorted to rents and sales to support itself, further squandering its now diminished land holdings.

In the following century, jurisdictional and fiscal disputes between the monastery and the community of Leno increased, while the abbey's misery was further increased by a raid by the Visconti in 1351. This was followed by the long abbacy of Andrea di Taconia, from Prague and chaplain to Charles IV, who held the fortunes of the abbey by balancing himself through various hardships in an attempt to at least maintain its prestige and dignity.

The abbot often stayed away from Leno, so much so that the seat was occupied by two usurpers: one of these, Ottobono, after the death of the Bohemian abbot (1408) teamed up with the Venetians during the conquest of Bresciano, and when the city was conquered by the Serenissima he obtained from the doge and the pope the leadership of the Lenese monastery (1434), confirmed, in the same year, by an important papal bull.

In 1451, upon Ottobono's death, Bartolomeo Averoldi became abbot. He first (1471) intertwined contacts with the reformed Congregation of Santa Giustina of Padua, in an attempt to counter the fall of the Monastery of San Benedetto di Leno and aggregate it with the Congregation, as the Brescian Abbey of Sant'Eufemia had already done; then, more interested in personal advancement than in the welfare of the Benedictine community, in exchange for the archbishopric of Split, with the pope's approval he gave the Lenese monastery in commendation in 1479 to the Venetian nobleman Pietro Foscari. This event sanctioned the final end of Leno's hegemonic role as an imperial monastery and opened the door to a further slow decline of the monastic community.

=== The end ===
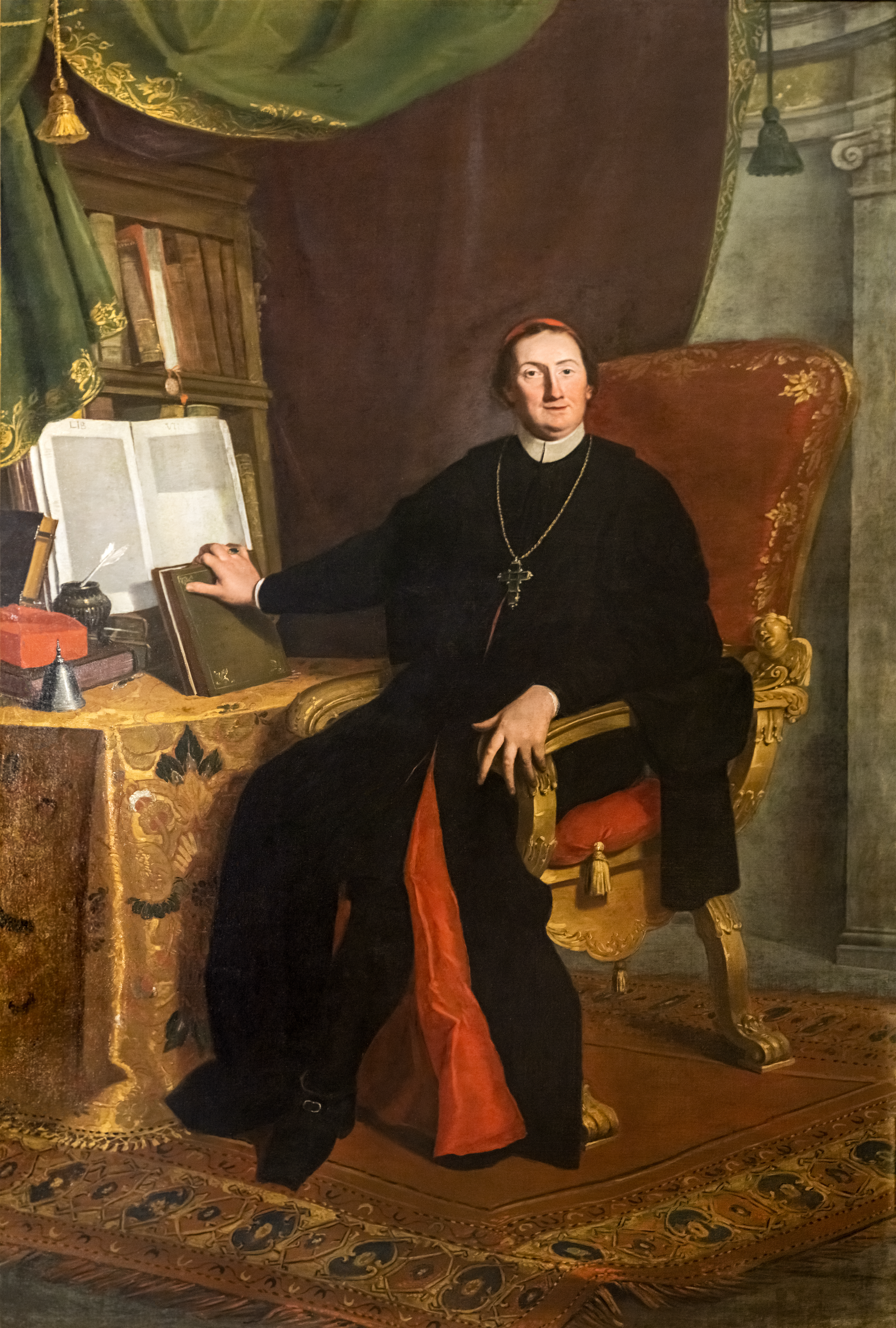
Angelo Maria Querini, commendatory abbot of Leno Abbey

After the cession in commendation of the monastery, mostly figures from the Venetian and Brescian nobility, such as the Foscari, Vitturi and Martinengo families, ruled its fortunes. The commendatory abbots were mostly interested in the titles they received with their appointment as abbot rather than by the actual organization of monastic life, also with regard to the fact that they often simultaneously exercised the office of bishop or other important prelatures, thus leaving the monastery to its own devices.

Case in point was the Abbey of Girolamo Martinengo (1529–1567), who had new rooms built for the monks and tenements for work use and planted, presumably, a vineyard. Meanwhile, quarrels continued between the Benedictine community and the local townships, particularly Ghedi, over the jurisdiction of numerous lands for agricultural use, which often resulted in the victory of the townships. Testifying to the poor state of the monastery are the directives issued by Charles Borromeo following the apostolic visitation that occurred in March 1580, which required the floor to be levelled, the tabernacle to be maintained, a crucifix to be provided, and the church to be painted.

In the seventeenth and eighteenth centuries the direction of the abbey was still the prerogative of Venetian patricians such as the Basadonna, Morosini, Barbarigo, and Querini families. In particular, Angelo Maria Querini, who held the position of commendatory abbot in the first half of the 18th century, limited himself only to receiving the income derived from the monastery (about 260 gold florins) and, while the Queriniana Library was being set up in Brescia on his initiative, he did not care at all to safeguard the copious Lenese archives and let the abbey buildings fall into ruin. In 1758 Marcantonio Lombardi was appointed commendatory abbot and commissioned Francesco Antonio Zaccaria to make a thorough historical and architectural survey about the Lenese monastery.

The scholar's work was published in Venice in 1767 under the title Dell'antichissima badia di Leno. Meanwhile, in 1759 a collection of bulls and diplomas addressed to the Leno monastery by Giovanni Ludovico Luchi had been published. Lombardi was to be the last abbot in the abbey's history: upon his death (1782), the remaining assets of the monastic institute were forfeited by the Republic of Venice, which, finding itself in a period of difficulty, tried to finance itself by abolishing the commendations, and in the following year, 1783, by senatorial decree the abbey was officially declared abolished.

The now former monastery was purchased, along with the land on which it stood, by the Dossi family, who asked and obtained permission from the Venetian government to proceed with the demolition of the abbey buildings: the site became a strip quarry for work on the construction of the new St. Peter's Parish Church. Thus ended the history of the abbey, which had lasted just over a millennium. The Dossi family then built a villa near the ancient monastery and kept the land as a meadow; the villa was in turn demolished in 1873 and replaced by the present Villa Badia.

== Archaeological excavations ==
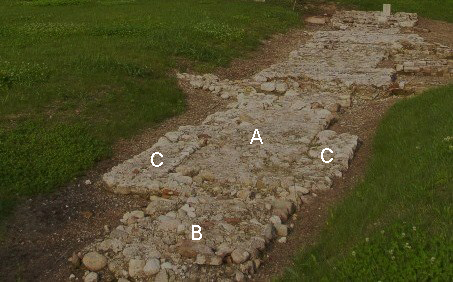
The remains found in the 2003–2004 excavation campaign. The three building phases of the abbey church can be clearly distinguished: A) Foundation of the Desiderian church (8th century); B) Grafting of the Wenzeslao second church (11th century);C) Thickening of the pre-existing foundation made by Gonterio for the third church (12th century).

It dates back to 1990, within a large archaeological project in the Lower Brescian area promoted by the University of Brescia, the first proposal to conduct excavations in the area where the ancient Benedictine monastery of San Benedetto di Leno stood, but the initiative was unsuccessful. It was not until 2002, after the purchase of the Villa Badia site (about 6500 m²) by a local bank, that the first geophysical prospecting using the GPR or georadar method began. The data confirmed the presence of groups of buried brick structures at several levels of depth; the following year, operating on the basis of data from scientific reconnaissance and eighteenth-century maps, the first excavation campaign began, which concluded in 2004.

The work of the archaeologists circumscribed to an area of 680 m² and unearthed part of the perimeter wall of the abbey church, distinguished in three phases, the foundations of the crypt, a painted tomb, the base of the ancient bell tower, and a few remains of abbey buildings. To the west of the abbey church, on the other hand, the presence of early medieval structures that can be dated to between the late 4th and 6th centuries was detected by georadar; the new area probably extends outside the area of Villa Badia, below the present parish church, in the area of the ancient castle, and was possibly separated from the monastery by an artificial moat, set up by the abbots to defend themselves from the Hungarians in the 10th century.

A second archaeological excavation campaign was undertaken in 2010, uncovering the foundations of a small church and multiple burials in its surroundings. The data that emerged are still being studied, but they seem to support the thesis of a settlement that pre-dated the founding of the monastery of St. Benedict.

== The abbey complex ==
=== First church ===
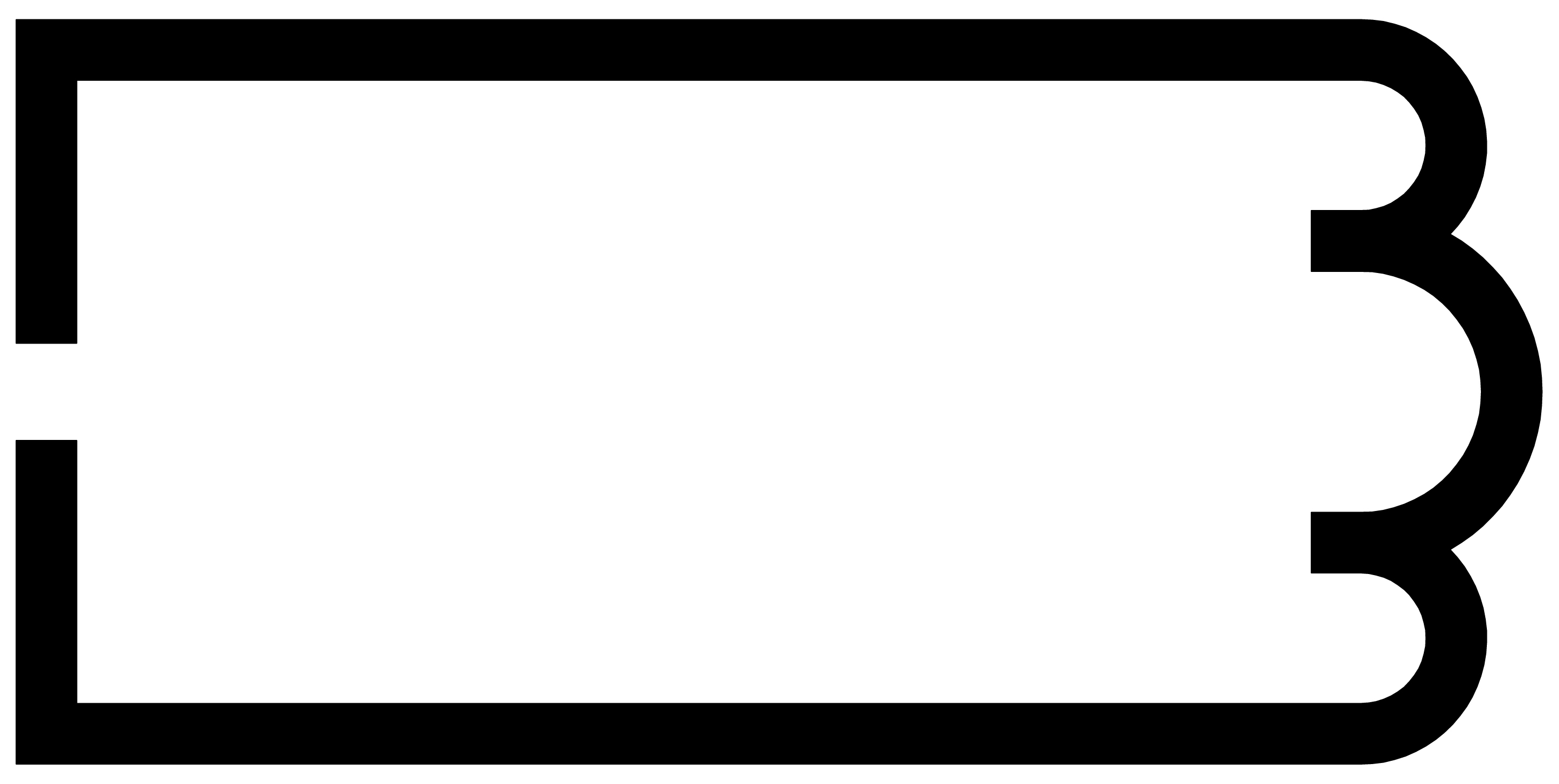
Floor plan of the first church

The first church of the Abbey of St. Benedict was founded a few years before the establishment of the monastery itself at the initiative of Desiderius, around 756, perhaps in anticipation of the erection of the monastery two years later. The existence of this primitive building has been confirmed by archaeological excavations, which, in addition to uncovering its foundations later incorporated in Gonterio's 12th-century reconstruction, led to the discovery of a burial ground with painted crosses dated to the 8th–9th centuries. The measurements, estimated during the excavations, are 16 to 24 meters long and 12 meters wide. The building also had the traditional orientation on the east-west axis.

The church ended in the east with the presbytery and altar and was probably triapsidal in the same way as the monastic churches of Desiderian foundation, such as San Salvatore in Brescia or San Salvatore in Sirmione, and as, on the other hand, the triple dedication of the sacred building to the Savior, Mary, and Archangel Michael suggests. Not demonstrable, but highly probable, is the existence from this early stage of the crypt, sufficiently motivated by the bestowal of important relics and by the likely similarities with the other Desiderian churches mentioned before.

=== Second church ===
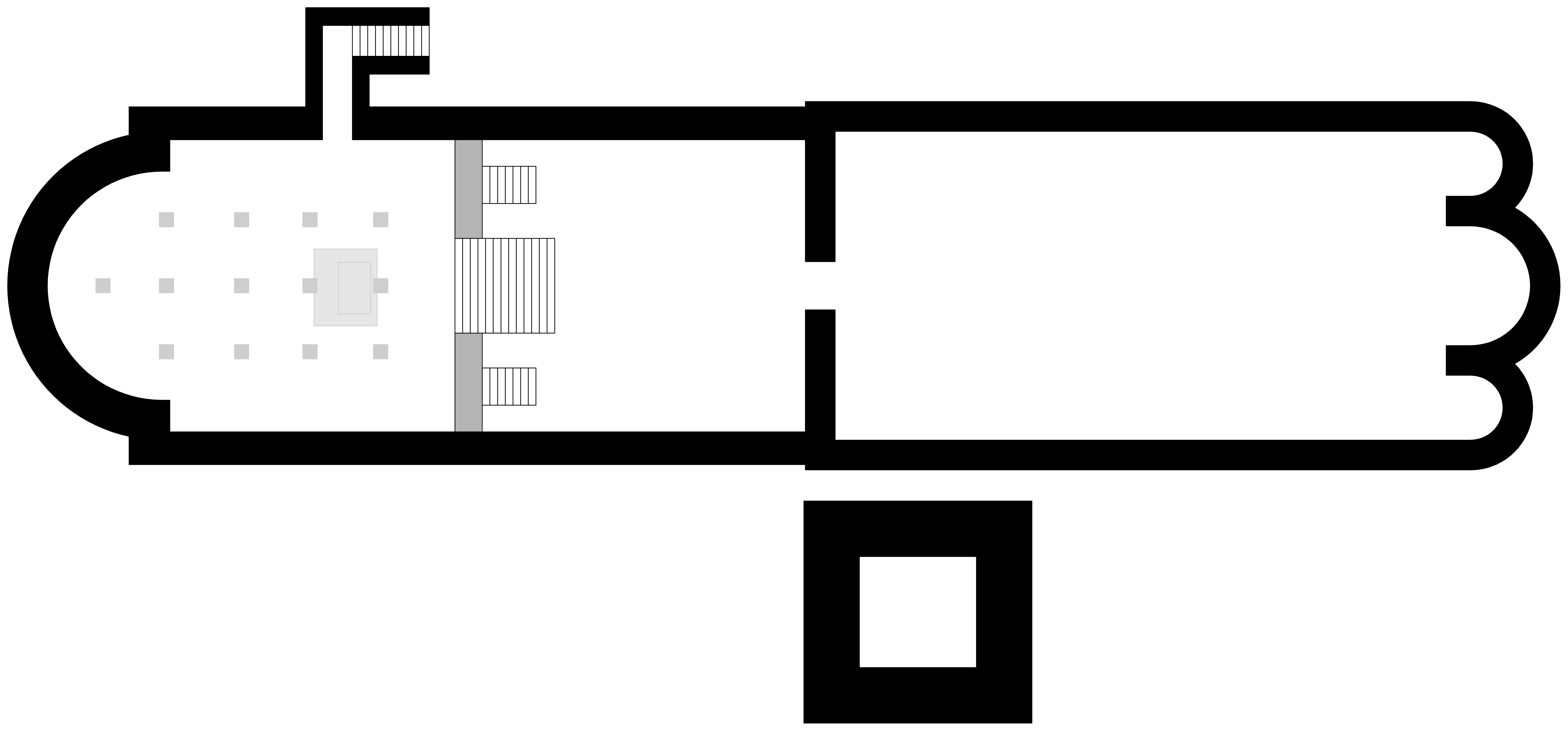
Floor plan of the second church

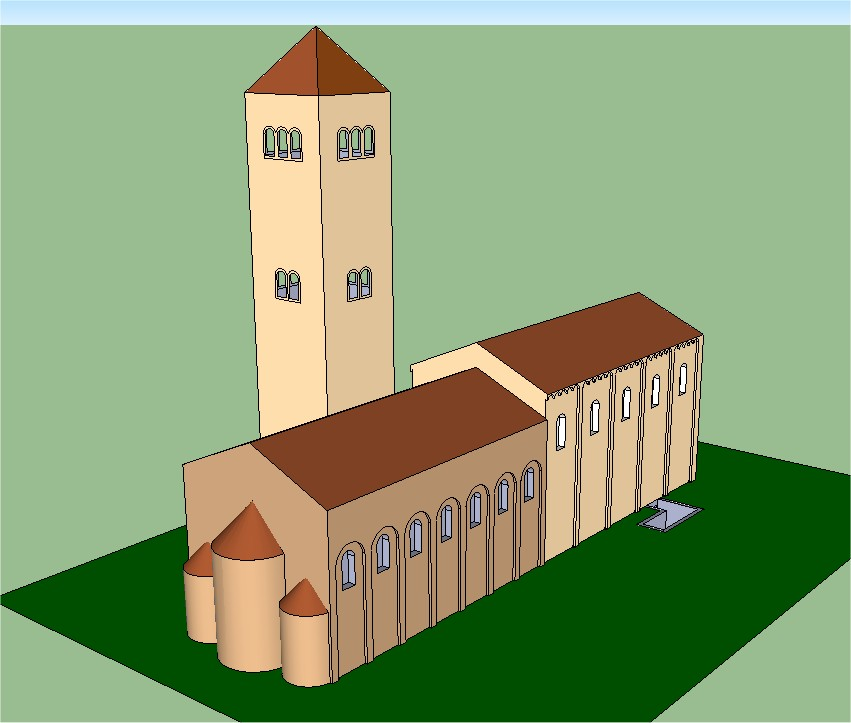
Reconstruction of the possible appearance of the 11th-century church

The second abbey church dates from the 11th century and was built at the initiative of Abbot Wenzeslao (1055–1068). The abbot's intervention took the form of a simple doubling to the west of the Wenzeslao church, which increased its length by about 28 meters, set on a single nave, ending in a wide apse with a raised chancel, where baptism was perhaps administered, and a crypt below provided with an altar. The latter was probably accessed by means of two staircases lateral to the main staircase, which instead led to the altar above.

The crypt consisted of four small naves, punctuated by 15 slender columns and provided both with an entrance that put it in direct communication with the outside and with masonry seats in the apsidal hemicycle that suggested the existence of a choir for the friars. Whether this extension of the first church to the west ended up resulting in two different sacred rooms, communicating through the ancient entrance to the church, or rather with the creation of a large sacred building from the unified environment through the demolition of the facade of the Desiderian structure, cannot be known with certainty.

With the building of the second church was also erected, on its southern perimeter side, a massive bell tower that hinted at the plebeian connotations of the monastery, supporting the thesis of the existence of a baptistery. Andrea Breda, in 2007, hypothesized, on the basis of the size of the foundations of the bell tower, that it must have been comparable to that of the basilica of San Zeno in Verona. The bell tower, as well as the second church, was, however, short-lived, having already disappeared in the early 12th century with the construction of the large church of Gonterio.

=== Third church ===
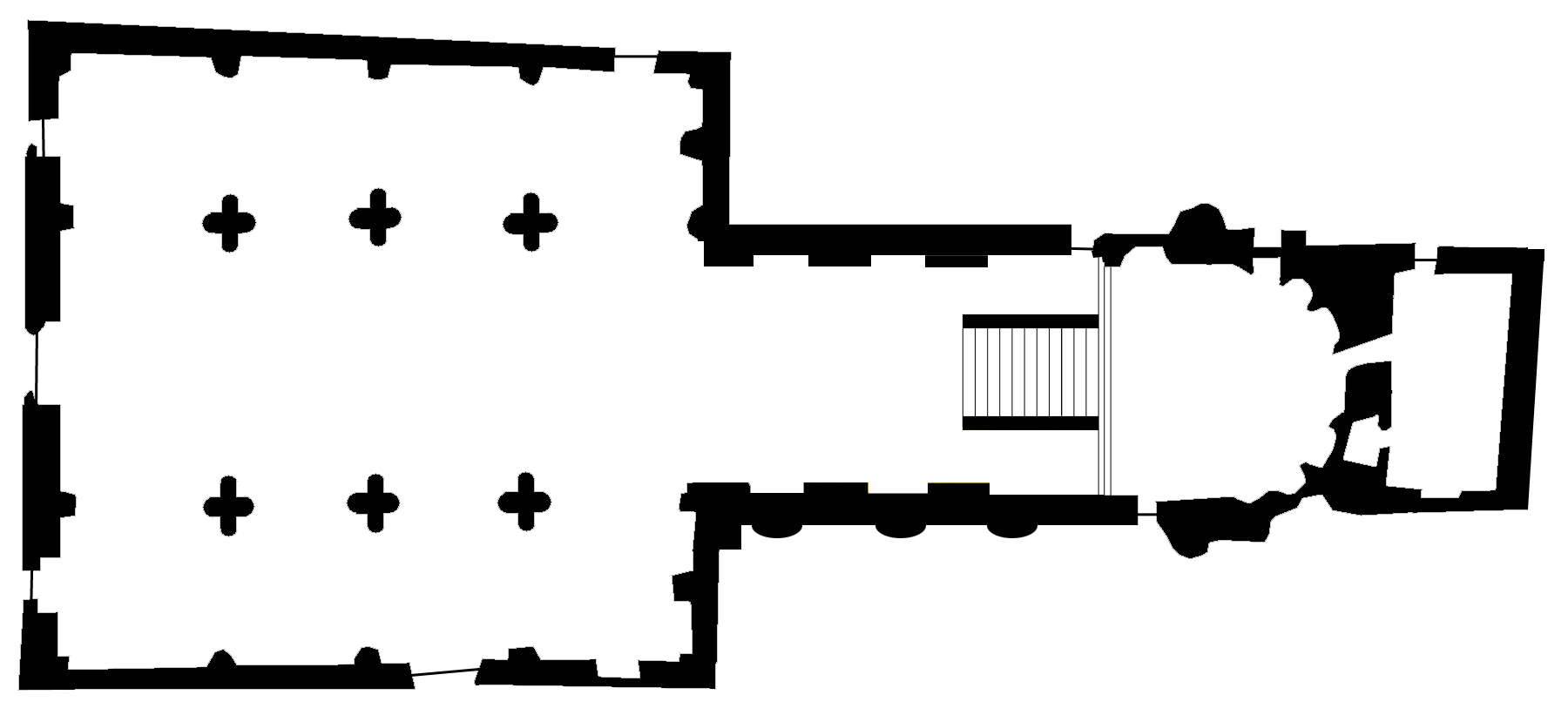
Floor plan of the third church

The last architectural phase of the abbey church, the one that later survived until the eighteenth century, can be dated to the twelfth century, operated at the behest of Abbot Gonterio. The construction of the building, although respecting the orientation of the previous building and tracing some of its features, involved the complete demolition of the Desiderian church and the Wenzeslao extension. The building was in quite unusual but imposing forms, almost 50 meters long and more than 25 meters wide, divided into two clearly distinct areas.

The first was the large hall reserved for the faithful, divided into three naves by large quadrilobed pillars 1.80 m in diameter, three on each side. This was followed by a long presbytery concluded by a semicircular apse, reserved instead for the monks. In the last section, the presbytery was also greatly elevated, and in the space below it opened a large crypt, probably intended for the veneration of the relics of St. Benedict and Saints Vitalis and Martialis, and still existing in the second half of the 16th century.

There is no knowledge of the pictorial and stone decorations that once must have adorned the building: the only major fragments that have survived come from the church's main portal or "royal door," carved as part of Gonterio's building site and still intact at the end of the 18th century. The remains consist of part of the lunette above the lintel, conformed in a succession of small arches with a human figure in the center, probably Jesus, and three lions: two of them are now preserved at the entrance to the Leno parish church, while the third, one of the two stylophores that supported the columns of the prothyrum, is inside the town hall of the town.

=== The other abbey buildings ===
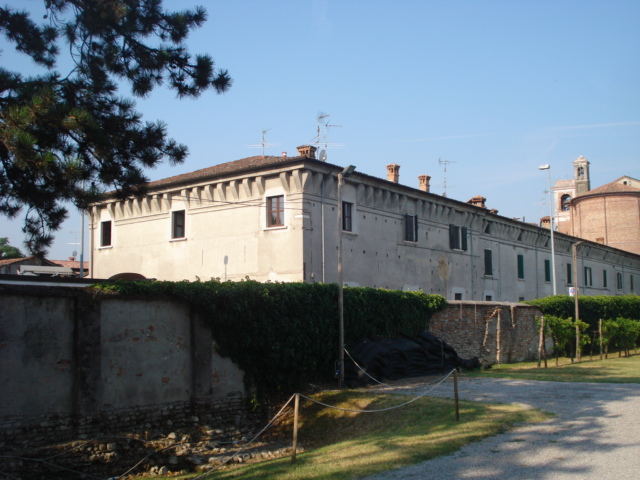
Badia Vecchia ("Old Abbey")

The rest of the abbey complex can be reconstructed on the basis of a map in the State Archives of Venice dating from the late eighteenth century, perhaps from shortly before the demolition, which illustrates in plan form the various rooms. The church to the south aligned on the east-west axis, with an apse to the east, can be recognized, followed to the north by the other buildings, in particular the large cloister, which appears, however, to be preserved on only two wings.

A small apsidal building can be seen to the northeast, which can be identified with one of the two oratories, St. Mary's and St. James's, present in the abbey in addition to the church. Toward the west is a large vineyard planted in the 16th century, which probably replaced other earlier structures. Also in the sixteenth century, a palace with service facilities and new cells for the monks had then been inaugurated by the commendatory abbot Girolamo Martinengo to the south of the abbey church, which still exists today as a building for housing purposes known by the name Badia Vecchia.

Archaeological data are meager, however, and there is nothing to confirm exactly the existence of a library, a scriptorium or a school for pueri oblati, although these are all structures of plausible existence, at least during the abbey's heyday, given the monastery's relevance in medieval times. In this sphere is ascribed the speculation of scholars about a codex, now preserved at the Queriniana Library in Brescia, presumably originating in the Lenese monastery.

== The prerogatives of the monastery ==
From the earliest years of its existence, the monastery of St. Benedict had been largely endowed with property and possessions. The abbey was configured as an imperial monastery or Reichklöster not only because of the eminence of the founder, but especially because of the role played by the monks within imperial politics. The emperors, beyond broad land concessions, gave the monastery's abbots such rights as tax exemption, free election of abbots, the power to appoint a lawyer who in turn appointed two judges to administer justice in the curtes dependent on Leno, and again the exclusive ownership of tithes collected on abbey-owned land.

The papal privileges, besides reconfirming some imperial concessions, guaranteed others of a very important spiritual nature. First of all, the abbot of Leno could be consecrated only by the pope; the rector of the monastery also had the right to call on any bishop for the consecration of canons and chrism, thus freeing himself from the obligation to defer to the Brescian prelate, and also the right, during Roman councils, to wear the mitre and episcopal robes. Papal bulls also ensured that the abbots could establish markets and build castles and churches on abbey-owned territories. Ultimately, the monastery and all its appurtenances became a kind of enclave within the diocese of Brescia.

This regime of exemptions and privileges began to gradually fade from the 12th century onward, at the end of the struggle for investiture.

== Monastic life and activities of the abbey ==
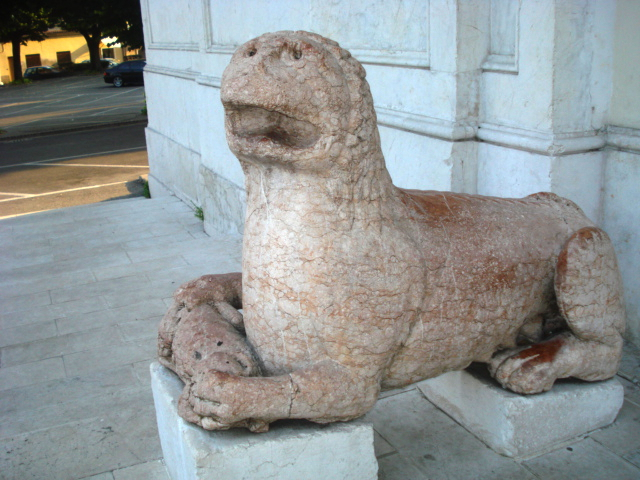
One of the lions in front of the entrance to the Leno parish church, from the main portal of the abbey's 12th-century church

The Benedictine monks, who had always been considered great reclaimers of marshy areas, did not need to undertake major drainage works when they arrived in Leno. Much of the Lower Brescian area had already been reclaimed by the Romans, so they limited themselves to draining only meager swampy areas.

The huge amount of land owned by the monastery of St. Benedict was redistributed to the peasants, who worked it on behalf of the abbots, giving them part of the harvest (tithe), which consisted mainly of wheat; the abbey funds were organized into curtes, administered on behalf of lay delegates or by the monks themselves. Livestock farming and viticulture were also intensively practiced, with the construction of canals for agricultural use. Deforestation made Leno a focal point for the timber trade throughout the district; the land obtained by logging became either new arable fields or pastures for sheep and cattle, but substantial areas of woodland were maintained since these were of enormous economic importance for activities such as hunting or pig farming, which required large quantities of acorns. Manual and agricultural work were considered activities for servants, while monks were mostly dedicated to managerial, cultural, welfare, religious, and at most handicraft tasks. There were in fact monks who devoted themselves to transcribing codices in the scriptorium, instructing oblates, caring for the sick and strangers in the xenodochium and hospital, and artisan friars such as blacksmiths, shoemakers, carpenters, or cooks.

As an imperial monastery, the abbots had important tasks in the public order on behalf of the ruler, a commitment rewarded by the emperor himself who ensured the security and quiet of the monastic complex.

Conspicuous, at least until the whole of the ninth century, was the number of brethren, exceeding a hundred. Of these, at least a third must have been children, the so-called pueri oblati, entrusted by their parents to the abbot so that he would take care of their education and sustenance, promising in return the taking of religious vows by their infant. The existence in the monastery of St. Benedict of Leno of a school for the education of these children seems to be confirmed, but from the beginning of the 12th century the oblation of children was moderated and regulated, which resulted in a drastic decrease in the number of Lenese monks.

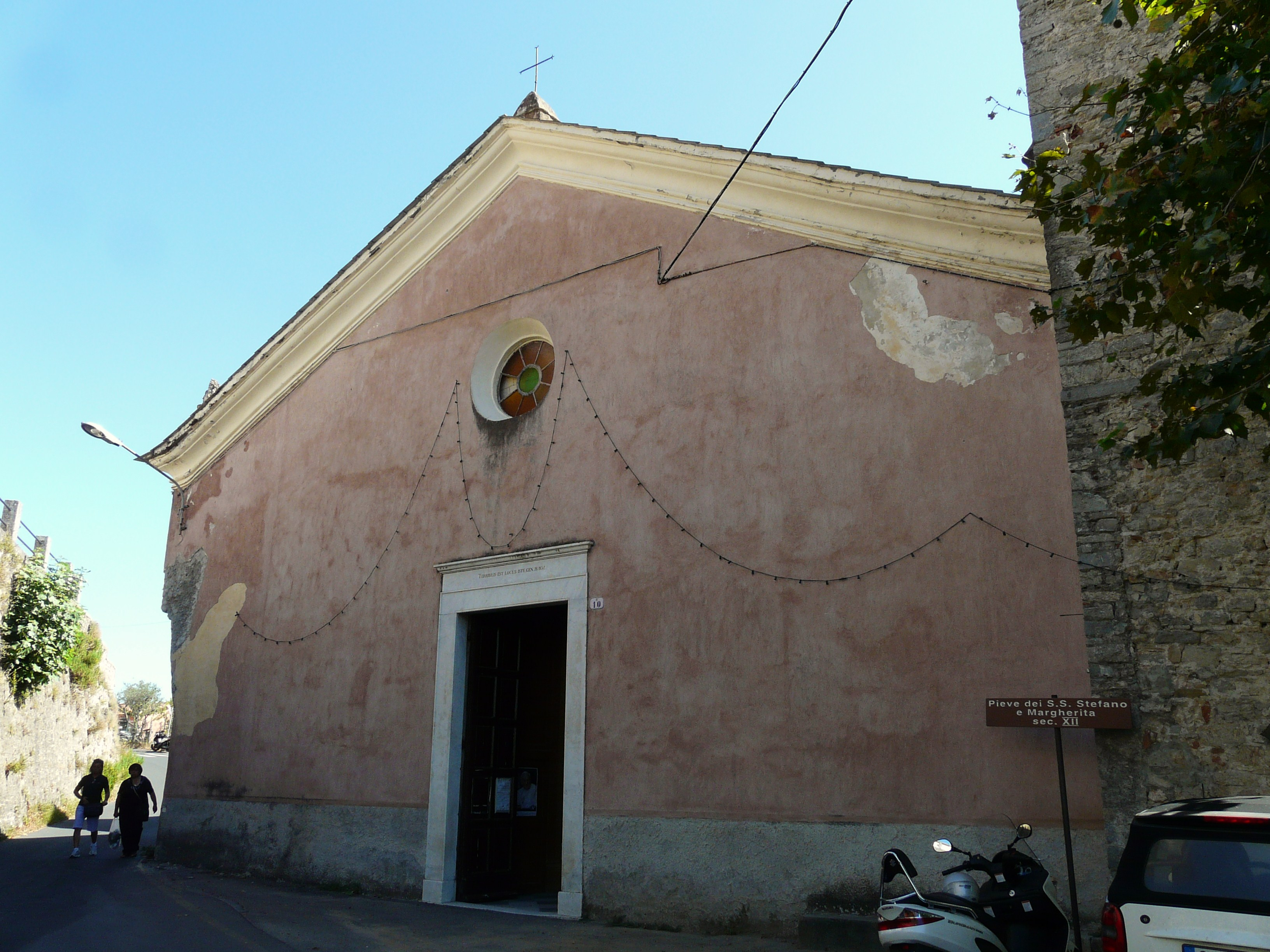
The parish church of Santi Stefano e Margherita in Arcola, an ancient property of the Lenese abbey

The monks were also in charge of the pastoral care of their estates, as the dispute over Gambara well testifies. They administered the sacraments in the external churches under their jurisdiction such as the Leno church of San Giovanni or in Ostiano and perhaps also in the abbey church. The monastic community of Leno and its dependencies offered shelter to the poor and pilgrims, a fact that is reflected in the existence of a large, two-story guesthouse that hosted, moreover, a judicial assembly presided over by Frederick Barbarossa in 1185. In 1209, the construction of a hospital for the care of the sick was also begun.

The abbey's possessions, scattered throughout the North, made it necessary to have a continuous and stable relationship with the abbey seat of Leno. A key communication route for the monastery's economy was the Oglio River, which flowing into the Po put the Brescian area in direct contact with the Adriatic Sea. Always taking advantage of this important waterway, salt extracted near Comacchio, a locality where the abbots of St. Benedict owned salt pans, was imported inland. The market of the Badia, although originating and developing in the manorial context, was a relatively open economy, whose main trade exchanges were carried out with the cities of Verona, Brescia and Pavia, localities where, moreover, structures owned by the monastery such as the Brescia church of San Benedetto were located. In addition, there is a record of Lenese possessions in the Lunigiana area, an important transit area for pilgrims on the Via Francigena from which it collected toll duties and offered them shelter.

== The surviving testimonies ==
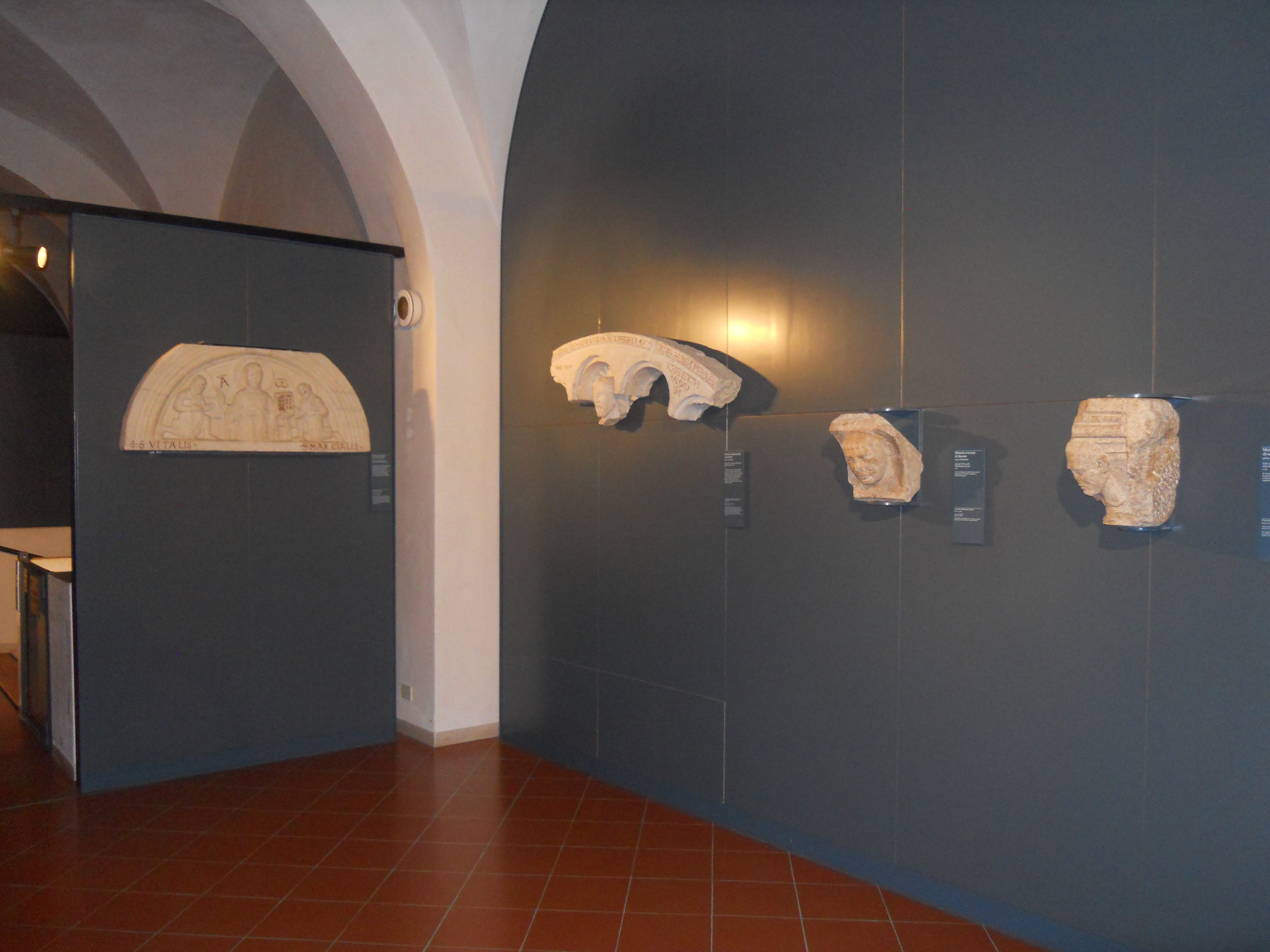
The section of the Santa Giulia Museum in Brescia devoted to fragments from the Lenese abbey

In addition to the structures that emerged during the archaeological excavations carried out on the abbey site, a group consisting of about a hundred fragments of various kinds, mostly stone and from the original plastic and architectural decoration of the monastic buildings, has survived. These fragments, either recovered directly from the abbey structures being demolished or recognized as coming from Leno only later, or still recovered during 20th-century excavations, are mostly preserved in the Santa Giulia Museum in Brescia and in public places or private collections in Leno.

For most of them it is practically impossible to trace their original location, since they are mostly small fragments now completely estranged from the context for which they were intended: they are, for the most part, small capitals, column bases, fragments of cornices or remnants of larger decorative plastic complexes. Among the most historically, artistically and documentarily significant pieces are the remains of the abbey church portal, some funerary inscriptions, a lunette worked in bas-relief, and two Madonnas with Child in stucco, but of uncertain provenance. Most of the fragments are dated to the earliest phases of the monastic complex (8th–10th centuries), while the others, the most substantial, can be ascribed to the 12th–13th centuries, to the renovations carried out by Gonterio. Other, later pieces are distributed from the 15th to 17th centuries.

== Chronotaxis of the abbots of Leno ==
The chronotaxis of abbots who ruled the fortunes of the abbey according to Zaccaria and Ferrante Aporti is proposed below:

=== Regular abbots ===
- Ermoaldo (759–790), a Brescian, allied himself with Potone, duke of Brescia, who was later killed, to reinstate him in the lordship of the city.
- Lantperto (c. 790–796), from the Abbey of Monte Cassino
- Amfrido (c. 796–800), appointed bishop of Brescia
- Badolfo or Baldolfo (c. 800–815), Charlemagne gave him the lands of Sabbioneta.
- Ritaldo (c. 815–840)
- Remigio (c. 840–869)
- Magno (c. 869 –?)
- Alberto (939–958)
- Donnino (958–981), accepted in exchange from Atto, count of Modena and Reggio, some of his property with the Gonzaga lands already owned by the abbey.
- Ermenolfo (981–999), in 994 was subjected to the abuse of the bandit Ramon, who was driven out of the abbey only in 996 with the arrival of Emperor Otto III.
- Liuzzone (999–1015)
- Andrea (1015–1019), deposed by Pope Benedict VIII
- Odone Gambara (1019–1036)
- Richerio (1036–1038), of Germanic descent, was a friend of Emperor Conrad II.
- Riccardo Gambara, (1038–1060)
- Wenzeslao (Guenzelao, according to Zaccaria) (1060–1078)
- Artuico (Arduino) (c. 1078–1104)
- Tedaldo (c. 1104–1146), under his regency, in 1137, the abbey suffered a violent fire.
- Onesto I (1146–1163), arranged for the reorganization of the burned abbey and the church, which was consecrated by Pope Eugene III.
- Lanfranco Gambara (1163–1168), abbot intruder
- Alberto da Reggio (1168–1176)
- Daniele (1176–1178)
- Gonterio Lavello Lungo (1178–1209), in 1205 the inhabitants of Leno rebelled against the lordship of the abbots.
- Onesto II (1209–1227)
- Epifanio (1227–1230)
- Pellegrino (c. 1230–1241)
- Giovanni (c. 1241–1248)
- Guglielmo (1248–1297), from Parma
- Pietro Baiardi (1297–1307), from Parma
- Uberto da Palazzo (1307–1312)
- Aicardo (1312–1339), from Parma
- Pietro Pagati (1339–1366), from Ghedi. The Humiliati of Brescia joined the friars of the abbey, bringing their property as dowry.
- Giovanni Griti (Gritti) (1366–1370)
- Andrea of Tacovia (1370–1407), from Tachov (Bohemia)
- Ottobono count of Langosco and Mirabello (1402–1451, then legitimized by the pope in 1434), usurper. Under his regency, in 1434, the cession of San Martino dall'Argine to Gianfrancesco Gonzaga, first marquis of Mantua, took place.
- Antonio di Rozoaglio (1403–1434), usurper, deposed by the pope
- Bartolomeo Averoldi (1451–1479), scholar. Received the chair of Split.

=== Commendatory abbots ===
- Pietro Foscari, cardinal (1479–1486)
- Francesco Vitturi (1586–1512)
- Vittore Vitturi (1512–1513)
- Francesco della Rovere, bishop of Vicenza (1513–1516)
- Antonio del Monte, cardinal (1516–1529)
- Girolamo Martinengo (1529–1567) (I)
- Ascanio Martinengo (1567–1583)
- Girolamo Martinengo (1583–1591) (II)
- Giovanni Francesco Morosini, cardinal (1591–1595)
- Gianfrancesco Morosini (1595–1628) (I)
- Gianfrancesco Morosini, patriarch of Venice (1628–1679) (II)
- Pietro Basadonna (1679–1690)
- Marcantonio Barbarigo (1690–1706)
- Francesco Maria Barbarigo (1706–1714)
- Cornelio Maria Francesco Bentivoglio, cardinal (1714–1733)
- Neri Maria Corsini, cardinal (1733–1734)
- Angelo Maria Querini, cardinal and bishop of Brescia (1734–1758)
- Marcantonio Lombardi, bishop of Crema (1758–1782)

== See also ==
- Leno, Lombardy
- Desiderius
- Benedictines

== Bibliography ==
- Aporti, Ferrante (2004). Memorie storiche riguardanti San Martino dall'Argine. Mantova: Gianluigi Arcari editore. ISBN 88-88499-22-9.
- Baronio, Angelo, ed. (2002). L'abbazia di San Benedetto di Leno: mille anni nel cuore della pianura Padana; atti della giornata di studio (Leno, Villa Seccamani, 26 maggio 2001). Brescia: Associazione per la storia della chiesa bresciana.
- Baronio, Angelo, ed. (2006). San Benedetto "ad Leones": un monastero benedettino in terra longobarda. Brescia: Associazione per la storia della chiesa bresciana.
- Bonaglia, Angelo (1985). Gottolengo dalle origini neolitiche all'età dei Comuni. Brescia: Apollonio.
- Andenna, Giancarlo; Rossi, Marco, eds. (2007). Società bresciana e sviluppi del romanico. Peschiera Borromeo: Solari.
- Cirimbelli, Luigi (1993). Leno. Dodici secoli nel cuore della Bassa. Il territorio, gli eventi, i personaggi. Borgo Poncarale: Cassa rurale ed artigiana padana.
- Guerrini, Paolo (1947). "Un cardinale gregoriano a Brescia. Il vescovo Arimanno". Studi gregoriani per la storia di Gregorio VII e della riforma gregoriana. Vol. 2.
- Guerrini, Sandro (1988). "Cultura e arte nella Bassa bresciana". Bassa bresciana: un patrimonio ambientale e culturale da conoscere e valorizzare. Leno: Percorsi.
- Malvezzi, Jacopo (1732). "Chronicon Brixianum ab origine urbis ad annum MCCCXXXII". In Muratori, Ludovico Antonio (ed.). Rerum Italicarum Scriptores. Vol. XXI. Milano.
- Pelati, Pierino (1996). Acque, terre e borghi del territorio mantovano. Saggio di toponomastica. Asola.
- Picasso, Giorgio (2001). "Il monachesimo bresciano nella storiografia di fine secolo". Dove va la storiografia monastica in Europa?: temi e metodi di ricerca per lo studio della vita monastica e regolare in età medievale alle soglie del terzo millennio. Milano: Vita e pensiero. ISBN 88-343-0754-2.
- Ragni, Elena Lucchesi; Morandini, Francesca; Tabaglio, Piera; de Leonardis, Francesco, eds. (2010). I tesori di Santa Giulia museo della città. Vol. 2. Brescia: Grafo.
- Zaccaria, Francesco Antonio (1767). Dell'antichissima badia di Leno. Venezia.
- Zoppè, Leandro (1988). Itinerari gonzagheschi. Milano: Itinera Edizioni. ISBN 88-85462-10-3.
