= Léon (Swedish singer) =

Swedish singer and songwriter

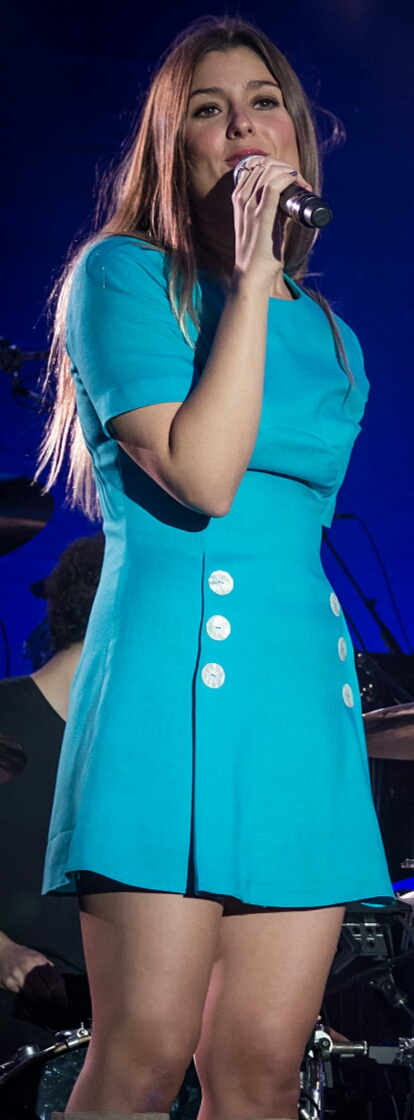

Background information
- Born: Lotta Lindgren; 26 February 1993 (age 33)
- Origin: Stockholm, Sweden
- Genre: Indie pop
- Occupations: Singer, songwriter
- Instruments: Vocals; guitar
- Years active: 2015–present
- Label: Columbia Records / LÉON Recordings / BMG

Lotta Lindgren (born 26 February 1993), known by her stage name Léon (stylized as LÉON), is a Swedish singer and songwriter from Stockholm, Sweden. Her first single, "Tired of Talking", was released on SoundCloud in July 2015. She has released three full-length albums: LÉON, Apart, and Circles. She also collaborated with Jonas Blue on the house single "Hear Me Say".

== Career ==
=== Early life ===
Lotta Lindgren was born in Stockholm, Sweden in 1993. She comes from a musical family: her mother is a cellist and her father is a composer and conductor. Léon began her musical career as front-woman of a hip hop and soul group in her teens before embarking on a solo career with producing partner Agrin Rahmani in 2015. She has cited Amy Winehouse, Janis Joplin, Beyoncé, Etta James, Sam Cooke, and Stevie Wonder as musical inspirations.

=== 2015–2017: First EPs ===
Her first single, "Tired of Talking", off her debut release, Treasure (EP), gained immediate attention earning praise from the music executive and producer Chris Anokute and getting a mention by the singer Katy Perry, who tweeted "she's one to watch!" The song went viral clocking up millions of plays on streaming platforms.

In October 2016, Léon played at the 31st edition of Eurosonic Noorderslag in Groningen, Netherlands. Her second EP, For You, was released on 3 March 2017, followed by Surround Me (EP) consisting of four tracks in October the same year.

=== 2018–2019: Debut album ===
Léon's first full-length album, titled LÉON, was released in March 2019 via her own LÉON Recordings in partnership with BMG. The album's release was preceded by the singles "Baby Don't Talk", "Falling" and the breakout song "You And I".

Produced by the production teams ELECTRIC and Captain Cuts, the album blends modern electronic production values and more intimate stripped down sounds, with varied styles ranging from synth-pop to retro-pop and soul.

The album was met with positive reviews from the critics, who praised its intricate melodies and intimate feel, comparing Léon's vocals with those of Stevie Nicks and Amy Winehouse. To promote the album, Léon embarked on a tour of Europe, the UK and USA.

=== 2020–present: Apart ===
After a series of singles, including "And It Breaks My Heart" and "Chasing a Feeling", Léon released her sophomore studio album, Apart, in October 2020. Created in the midst of the COVID-19 pandemic, the album was recorded and produced from start to finish in her hometown of Stockholm, with an old time collaborator, Martin Stilling.

Though overall similar in sound to the debut album, Apart features a more stripped-back production and is more personal in nature. It has been characterized as a break-up album with songs filled with a sense of longing and nostalgia. The album received generally favourable reviews. Although critics noted that the album may be not as accomplished as Léon's first record – nor distinctly recognizable from it – they praised her song-writing abilities, and, like on her debut outing, her mature vocals.

In May 2021, Léon collaborated with Jonas Blue on the dance house single "Hear Me Say", which quickly amassed 18 million plays on streaming platforms. The video for the song, directed by Alex Nicholson, was released in July 2021.

In September 2021, a single, "Dancer", was released.

Léon released her third studio album Circles on 4 March 2022. It includes previously released singles "Dancer", "Soaked", "Fade Into a Dream" and "Wishful Thinking".

== Discography ==
=== Studio albums ===
Title	Details	Peak chart positions
Title	Details	SWE
Léon	Released: 1 March 2019; Label: Léon Recordings, BMG; Formats: LP, CD, Digital Download	58
Apart	Released: 30 October 2020; Label: Léon Recordings, BMG; Formats: LP, CD, digital download	—
Circles	Released: 4 March 2022; Label: LL Entertainment, BMG; Formats: LP, CD, digital download	—
"—" denotes a recording that did not chart or was not released.

=== Extended plays ===
Title	Details
Treasure	Released: 23 October 2015; Label: Columbia; Formats: Digital download
Spotify Singles	Released: 30 November 2016; Label: Columbia; Formats: Streaming
For You	Released: 3 March 2017; Label: Columbia; Formats: Digital download
Surround Me	Released: 6 October 2017; Label: Columbia; Formats: Digital download
Live from the Village (Acoustic)	Released: 10 May 2019; Label: LÉON Recordings, BMG; Formats: Streaming

=== Singles ===
Year	Title	Peak chart positions	Certifications	Album/EP
Year	Title	SWE	Certifications	Album/EP
2015	"Tired of Talking"	— (Note: "Tired of Talking" did not enter the Swedish singles chart, but peaked at number one on the Swedish Heatseeker chart.)	GLF: Gold	Treasure
2016	"Think About You"	— (Note: "Think About You" did not enter the Swedish singles chart, but peaked at number eleven on the Swedish Heatseeker chart.)	GLF: Gold	For You
2016	"Liar"	—		For You
2017	"Sleep Deprived"	—		For You
2017	"Surround Me"	—		Surround Me
2017	"Body"	—		Surround Me
2017	"I Believe in Us"	81		Surround Me
2017	"No Goodbyes"	—		Surround Me
2018	"Baby Don't Talk"	—		LÉON
2018	"Falling"	—		LÉON
2019	"You and I"	68	GLF: Platinum	LÉON
2020	"In a Stranger's Arms"	—		Apart
2020	"Who You Lovin"	—		Apart
2020	"And It Breaks My Heart"	—		Apart
2020	"Chasing a Feeling"	—		Apart
2020	"Head and Heart on Fire"	—		Apart
2021	"Dancer"	— (Note: "Dancer" did not enter the Swedish Singellista Chart, but peaked at number 14 on the Swedish Heatseeker Chart.)		Circles
2021	"Soaked"	—		Circles
2021	"Fade into A Dream"	—		Circles
2022	"Wishful Thinking"	—		Circles
2023	"Pretty Boy"	—		Non-album singles
2023	"Dirt"	—		Non-album singles
"—" denotes a recording that did not chart or was not released.

=== Other songs ===
Year	Single	Album
2016	"Dreams" (Recorded at Spotify Studios NYC)	Spotify Singles
2019	"Want You Back" (with Grey)	Non-album single
2021	"Hear Me Say" (with Jonas Blue)	Together
