= Leno (surname) =

Leno is a surname. Notable people with the surname include:

- Bernd Leno (born 1992), German footballer
- Dan Leno (1860–1904), English music hall comedian
- Jay Leno (born 1950), American comedian, actor, voice actor, writer, producer, and television host
- John Bedford Leno (1826–1894), English radical activist
- Mark Leno (born 1951), American politician
- Charles Leno (born 1991), American football player

== See also ==
- Lenno
