= Leon, Waushara County, Wisconsin =

Leon, Wisconsin
- Town
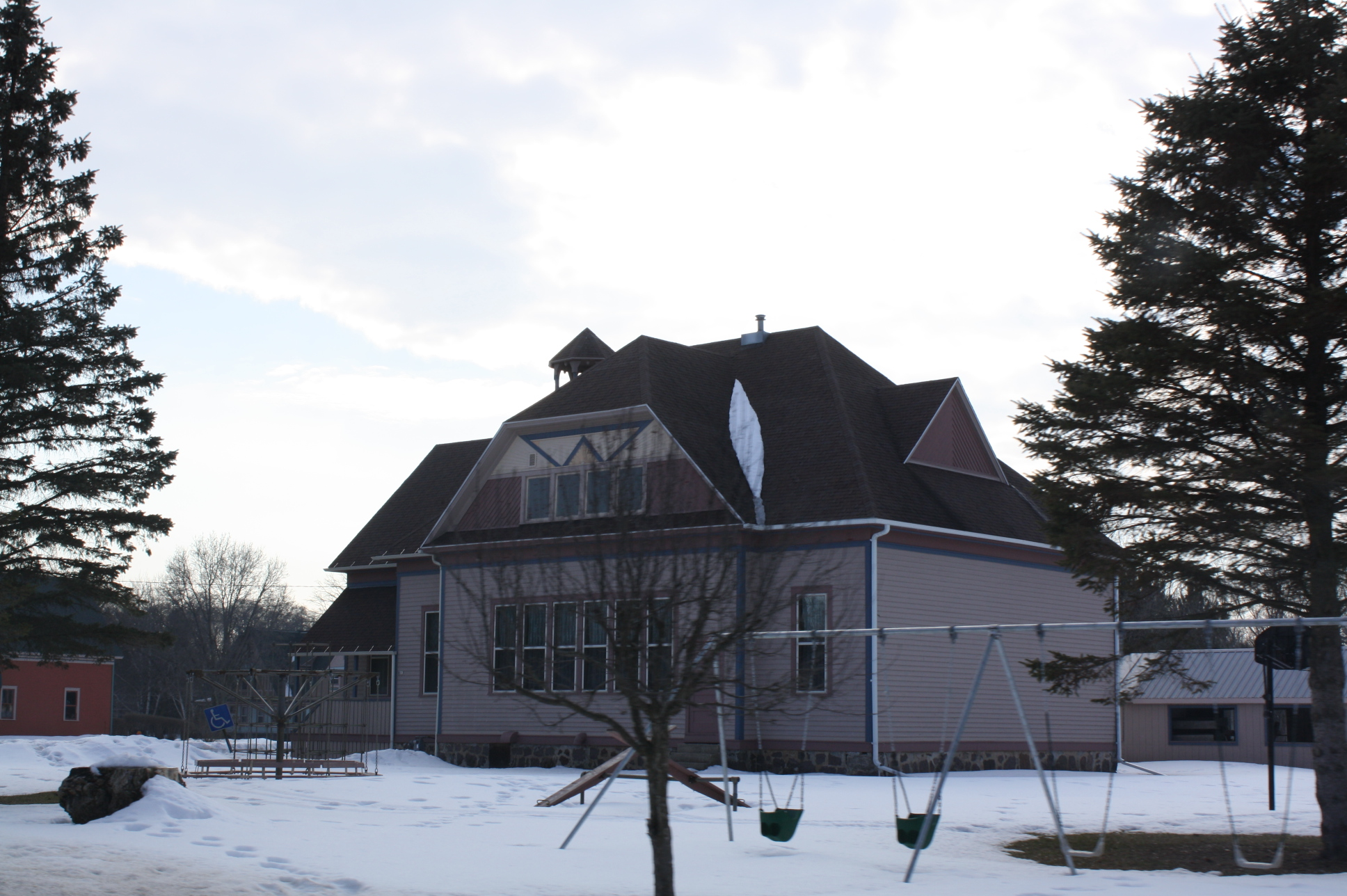
- Town hall in Pine River

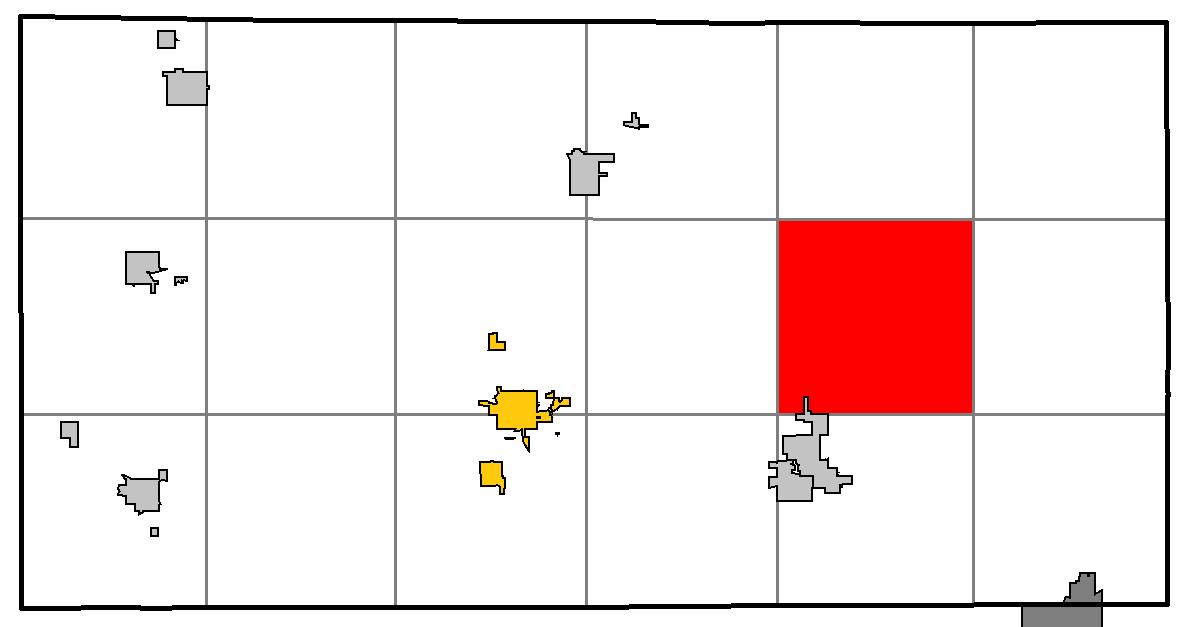
- Location of Leon, Waushara County, Wisconsin

- Location of Waushara County, Wisconsin
- Coordinates: 44°7′5″N 89°3′46″W
- Country: United States
- State: Wisconsin
- County: Waushara

Area
  - Total: 36.3 sq mi (94.0 km^{2})
  - Land: 36.0 sq mi (93.2 km^{2})
  - Water: 0.31 sq mi (0.8 km^{2})
- Elevation: 866 ft (264 m)

Population (2020)
  - Total: 1,534
  - Density: 42.6/sq mi (16.5/km^{2})
- Time zone: UTC-6 (Central (CST))
  - Summer (DST): UTC-5 (CDT)
- FIPS code: 55-43500
- GNIS feature ID: 1583545
- Website: https://www.townleon.com/

Leon is a town in Waushara County, Wisconsin, United States. The population was 1,534 at the 2020 census. The census-designated place of Pine River is located in the town. The village of Redgranite is located adjacent to the town.

== Geography ==
According to the United States Census Bureau, the town has a total area of 36.3 square miles (94.0 km^{2}), of which 36.0 square miles (93.2 km^{2}) is land and 0.3 square miles (0.8 km^{2}, 0.85%) is water.

== Demographics ==
As of the census of 2000, there were 1,281 people, 539 households, and 384 families residing in the town. The population density was 35.6 people per square mile (13.7/km^{2}). There were 851 housing units at an average density of 23.6 per square mile (9.1/km^{2}). The racial makeup of the town was 98.83% White, 0.47% Native American, and 0.70% from two or more races. Hispanic or Latino of any race were 0.70% of the population.

There were 539 households, out of which 23.6% had children under the age of 18 living with them, 64.7% were married couples living together, 3.9% had a female householder with no husband present, and 28.6% were non-families. 23.6% of all households were made up of individuals, and 10.4% had someone living alone who was 65 years of age or older. The average household size was 2.38 and the average family size was 2.81.

In town, the population was spread out, with 20.8% under the age of 18, 4.5% from 18 to 24, 24.0% from 25 to 44, 32.6% from 45 to 64, and 18.1% who were 65 years of age or older. The median age was 45 years. For every 100 females, there were 103.7 males. For every 100 females age 18 and over, there were 101.2 males.

The median income for a household in the town was $39,524, and the median income for a family was $45,938. Males had a median income of $30,924 versus $21,607 for females. The per capita income for the town was $18,445. About 3.9% of families and 7.7% of the population were below the poverty line, including 10.9% of those under age 18 and 8.7% of those age 65 or over.
