= Léon (album) =

Studio album by Léon
- Released: 1 March 2019
- Genres: Indie pop; soul
- Length: 34:39
- Labels: Léon; BMG

Léon chronology
Léon (2019)	Apart (2020)

Singles from Léon
- 1. "Baby Don't Talk" Released: 25 September 2018; 2. "Falling" Released: 9 November 2018; 3. "You and I" Released: 1 February 2019

Léon is the debut album by the Swedish indie-pop singer-songwriter Léon. The album was released in March 2019 via her own Léon Recordings in partnership with BMG Rights Management. The album features up-tempo songs, such as "Baby Don't Talk", "Falling" and the breakout song "You and I", which were promoted as singles ahead of the album's release, as well as more mellow compositions.

For the album, Léon worked with the production teams Electric and Captain Cuts, while acting as an arranger in the studio and playing some instruments. The resulting sound blends modern electronic pop production with more stripped down arrangements (such as the piano ballad "Come Home to Me"), while the varied styles on the album range from synth-pop to retro-pop and soul with country influences. One of the tracks on the album ("Cruel to Care") is a voice memo recorded on the phone.

Although the album did not make an impact on the charts, entering the Swedish chart only for one week, it generated positive reviews praising its intricate melodies, bittersweet lyrics and the singer's smokey vocals, which drew comparisons with Stevie Nicks and Amy Winehouse.

To promote the album, Léon embarked on a tour starting in Scandinavia, followed by several dates in other parts of Europe and the UK, before kicking off the final leg of the tour with more than 20 dates in North America.

== Track listing ==
Léon track listing
No.	Title	Writer(s)	Producer(s)	Length
1.	"Lost Time"	Edvard Førre Erfjord; Henrik Michelsen; Lotta Lindgren; Sean Douglas	Electric	3:52
2.	"Falling"	Erfjord; Michelsen; Lindgren	Electric	3:54
3.	"Hope Is a Heartache"	Erfjord; Michelsen; Lindgren	Electric	3:21
4.	"Come Home to Me"	Charlie McClean; Lindgren; Violet Skies	Charlie McClean	3:45
5.	"Baby Don't Talk"	Ben Berger; Lindgren; Ryan McMahon; Ryan Rabin	Captain Cuts	3:06
6.	"Better in the Dark"	Berger; Douglas; Lindgren; McMahon; Rabin	Captain Cuts	2:59
7.	"Cruel to Care" (voice memo)	Lindgren	–	3:24
8.	"Pink"	Aron Bergerwall; Lindgren	Aron Bergerwall; Electric	3:23
9.	"What You Said"	Linus Wiklund; Lindgren	Electric; Lotus IV	3:26
10.	"You and I"	Erfjord; Michelsen; Lindgren; Martin Stilling	Electric	3:44
Total length:				34:39

== Charts ==
Chart performance for Léon
Chart (2020)	Peak position
Swedish Albums (Sverigetopplistan)	58
