= Leon Airport =

Leon Airport may refer to:

- León Airport in Léon, Spain (IATA: LEN, ICAO: LELN)
- Leon Airport (West Virginia) in Leon, West Virginia, United States (FAA: W07)
- Del Bajío International Airport, in the León, Guanajuato, Mexico metropolitan area
- León Airport (Nicaragua) in León, Nicaragua
