= Leno, Lombardy =

Leno Lén
- Comune
- Comune di Leno
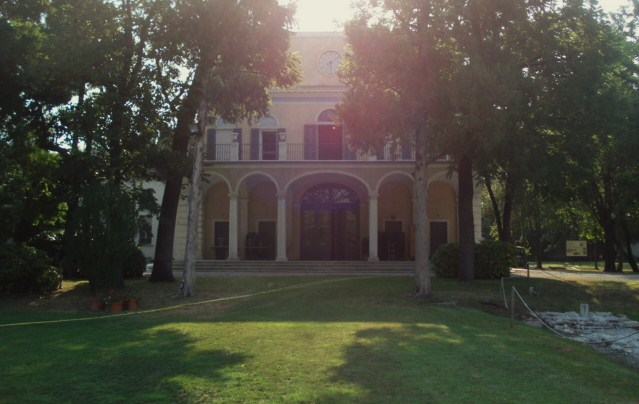
- Villa Badia.

- Coat of arms

- Location within Italy Location within Lombardy
- Coordinates: 45°22′N 10°13′E
- Country: Italy
- Region: Lombardy
- Province: Brescia (BS)
- Frazioni: Castelletto, Milzanello, Porzano

Government
  - Mayor: Cristina Tedaldi

Area
  - Total: 58.45 km^{2} (22.57 sq mi)
- Elevation: 66 m (217 ft)

Population (31 July 2021)
  - Total: 13,901
  - Density: 237.8/km^{2} (616.0/sq mi)
- Demonym: Lenesi
- Time zone: UTC+1 (CET)
  - Summer (DST): UTC+2 (CEST)
- Postal code: 25024
- Dialing code: 030
- Patron saint: Saints Peter and Paul
- Saint day: 10 July
- Website: Official website

Leno (Brescian: Lén) is a town and comune in the province of Brescia, in Lombardy, northern Italy.

== Twin towns ==
- Cassino, Italy, since 2005

== See also ==
- Abbey of Leno
- Madonna and Child with Saint Martin and Saint Catherine
