= León, Jujuy =

Coordinates: 24°02′S 65°25′W

León (Jujuy)
- Rural municipality and village
- Interactive map of León (Jujuy)
- Country: Argentina
- Province: Jujuy Province
- Time zone: UTC−3 (ART)

León (Jujuy) is a rural municipality and village in Jujuy Province in Argentina.
