= De León =

De León or de León or De Leon may refer to:

- De Leon, Texas, USA
- De Leon Independent School District of De Leon, Texas
- Manuel Márquez de León International Airport, the airport serving La Paz, Baja California Sur, Mexico
- De León (surname), people with the surname De León, de León or De Leon
