= List of rivers of Italy =

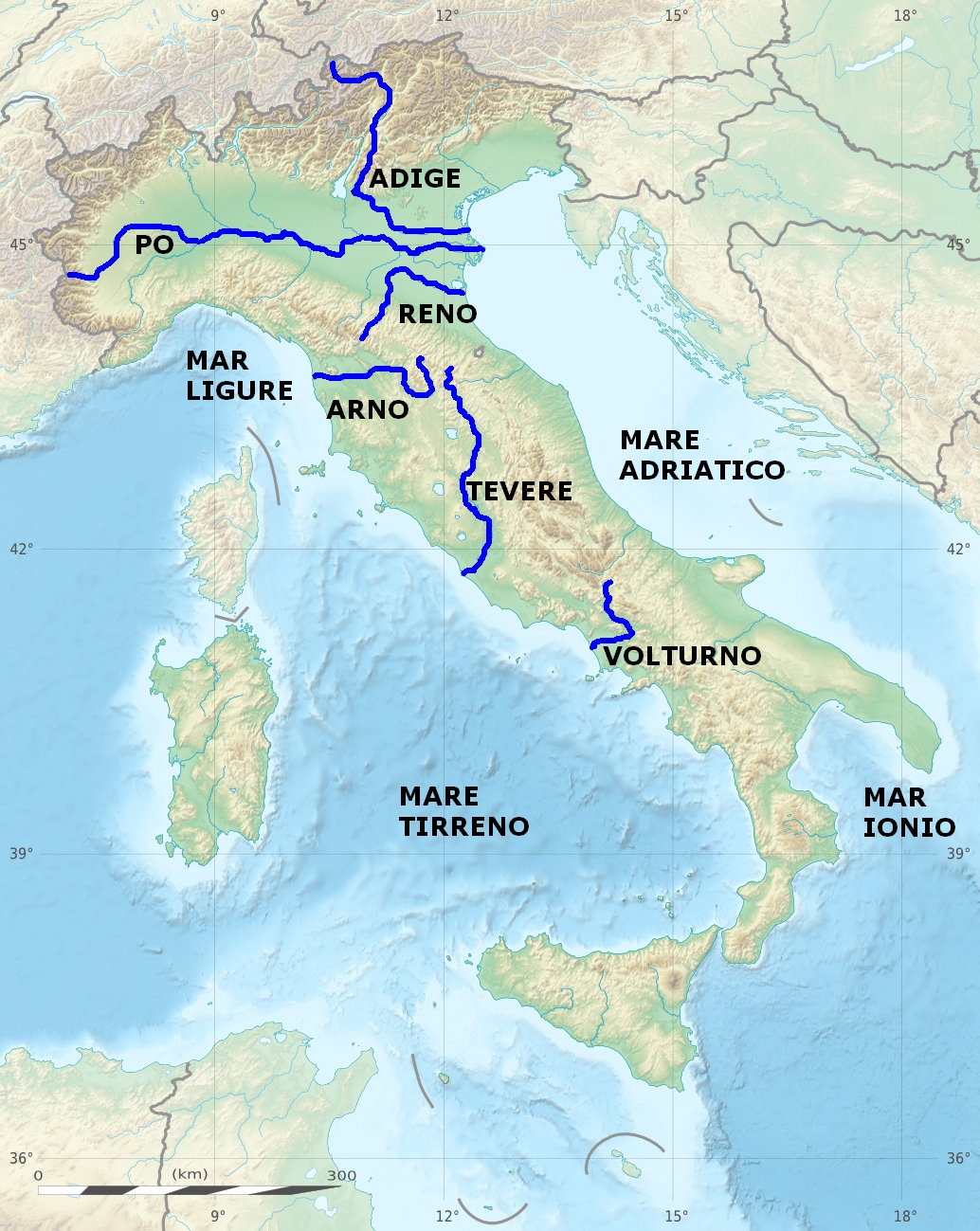
Location of some among the main Italian rivers

This is a list of rivers which are at least partially located in Italy. They are organized according to the body of water they drain into, with the exceptions of Sicily and Sardinia, which are listed separately. At the bottom, all of the rivers are also listed alphabetically.

Italian rivers are generally shorter than those of other European regions because Italy is partly a peninsula along which the Apennine chain rises, dividing the waters into two opposite sides. The longest river originating in Italy is the Drava, which flows for 724 km (450 mi), while the river flowing the most kilometers in Italy is the 652 km (405 mi) long Po.

Rivers in Italy total about 1,200, and give rise, compared to other European countries, to a large number of marine mouths. This is due to the relative abundance of rain events in Italy, and to the presence of the Alpine chain rich in snowfields and glaciers in the northern part of the country, in the presence of the Apennines in the center-south and in the coastal extension of Italy.

== Characteristics of Italian rivers ==
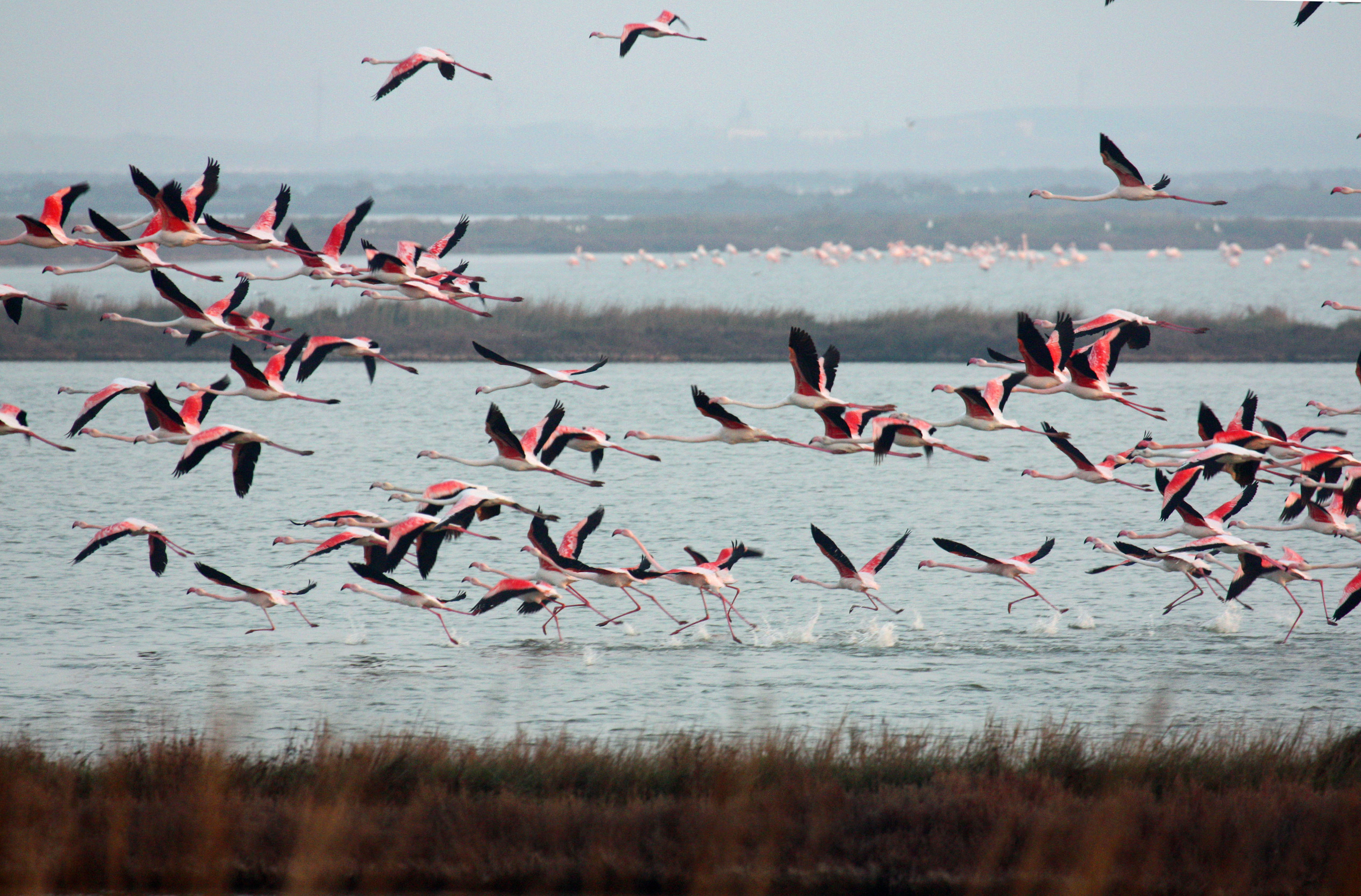
Flamingos in the delta of the Po river

- The widest and largest rivers belong to the Alpine region due to the arrangement and elevation of the relief, as well as the depth of the Po Valley.
- Along the peninsula, given the arrangement of the Apennine chain and the different slopes of the two sides, the rivers on the Adriatic and Ionian sides run through short transversal valleys and, except for the Reno, do not exceed 200 km (120 mi) in length, while ten are just over 100 km (62 mi). On the Tyrrhenian side instead, they are on average longer because the Apennine spurs and the sub-Apennine belt are wider.
- The rivers that flow into the Tyrrhenian sea are longer also because for the first stretch, they follow longitudinal valleys (Apennine valleys) and then run transversally with respect to the axis of the chain, in the south-Apennine area.
- Given the location of the springs and the local rainfall regime, the rivers of Italy are divided into:
  - Alpine rivers, of glacial origin, subject to flooding in spring and summer because when it is hot the glaciers melt. The lakes that frequently occupy the most depressed parts of the Alpine valleys serve to dampen the rush of the rivers and to clarify their murky waters. In fact, given the rapidity of the valleys from which the rivers descend, the speed of their waters is remarkable and their activity of erosion and transport of rocky debris is sensitive. Decanting is precisely the process by which this material is abandoned in the lakes of which these rivers are tributaries.
  - Apennine rivers, subject to sudden spring and autumn floods due to the rains. The lean period is in summer accentuated in the Northern Apennines, almost absolute in the southern one, except for some waterways (Aterno-Pescara, Sele, Volturno, Liri-Garigliano, to be limited to those that flow directly into the sea, to which are added Velino, Nera, Aniene all in the Tiber basin, etc.) which are fed by large karst springs that spring on the edge of areas characterized by permeable fissured rocks. In fact, there are no snowfields and glaciers on the Apennines (the only glacier, albeit small, is that of the Calderone, on the northern side of Corno Grande, in the Gran Sasso d'Italia massif, in Abruzzo); rainwater does not always collect in river beds made up of impermeable ground, that is, such as to allow a fair average annual flow.
  - The Sardinian and Sicilian rivers are torrential (full of water in winter and almost dry in summer), with the exception of Tirso, Flumendosa, Coghinas and Simeto.

== List of rivers in Italy over 150 km (93 mi) ==
Rivers of Italy over 150 km (93 mi) in length
Rank	River	Length	Regions crossed	Type
1	Po	652 km (405 mi)	Piedmont, Lombardy, Emilia-Romagna, Veneto	Alpine
2	Adige	410 km (250 mi)	Trentino-Alto Adige/Südtirol, Veneto	Alpine
3	Tiber	405 km (252 mi)	Emilia-Romagna, Tuscany, Umbria, Lazio	Apennine
4	Adda	313 km (194 mi)	Lombardy	Alpine
5	Oglio	280 km (170 mi)	Lombardy	Alpine
6	Tanaro	276 km (171 mi)	Piedmont, Liguria	Alpine
7	Ticino	248 km (154 mi)	Switzerland, Piedmont, Lombardy	Alpine
8	Arno	241 km (150 mi)	Tuscany	Apennine
9	Piave	231 km (144 mi)	Friuli-Venezia Giulia, Veneto	Alpine
10	Reno	212 km (132 mi)	Tuscany, Emilia-Romagna	Apennine
11	Sarca-Mincio	203 km (126 mi)	Trentino-Alto Adige/Südtirol, Veneto, Lombardy	Alpine
12	Volturno	175 km (109 mi)	Molise, Campania	Apennine
13	Brenta	174 km (108 mi)	Trentino-Alto Adige/Südtirol, Veneto	Alpine
14	Secchia	172 km (107 mi)	Emilia-Romagna, Lombardy	Apennine
15	Tagliamento	170 km (110 mi)	Friuli-Venezia Giulia, Veneto	Alpine
16	Dora Baltea	168 km (104 mi)	Aosta Valley, Piedmont	Alpine
17	Ombrone	160 km (99 mi)	Tuscany	Apennine
18	Chiese	160 km (99 mi)	Trentino-Alto Adige/Südtirol, Lombardy	Alpine
19	Liri-Garigliano	158 km (98 mi)	Abruzzo, Lazio, Campania	Apennine
20	Bormida	153 km (95 mi)	Liguria, Piedmont	Alpine
21	Aterno-Pescara	152 km (94 mi)	Abruzzo	Apennine
22	Tirso	152 km (94 mi)	Sardinia	Sardinian

== List of Italian rivers above 50 m^{3}/s (1,800 cu ft/s) ==
Rivers of Italy above 50 m^{3}/s (1,800 cu ft/s) of average flow at the mouth
Rank	River	Flow at the mouth	Regions crossed	Type
1	Po	1,540 m^{3}/s (54,000 cu ft/s)	Piedmont, Lombardy, Emilia-Romagna, Veneto	Alpine
2	Ticino	350 m^{3}/s (12,000 cu ft/s)	Switzerland, Piedmont, Lombardy	Alpine
3	Tiber	239 m^{3}/s (8,400 cu ft/s)	Emilia-Romagna, Tuscany, Umbria, Lazio	Apennine
4	Adige	235 m^{3}/s (8,300 cu ft/s)	Trentino-Alto Adige/Südtirol, Veneto	Alpine
5	Adda	187 m^{3}/s (6,600 cu ft/s)	Lombardy	Alpine
6	Isonzo	170 m^{3}/s (6,000 cu ft/s)	Slovenia, Friuli-Venezia Giulia	Alpine
7	Nera	160 m^{3}/s (5,700 cu ft/s)	Marche, Umbria, Lazio	Apennine
8	Oglio	137 m^{3}/s (4,800 cu ft/s)	Lombardy	Alpine
8	Piave	137 m^{3}/s (4,800 cu ft/s)	Veneto, Friuli-Venezia Giulia	Alpine
10	Liri-Garigliano	120 m^{3}/s (4,200 cu ft/s)	Abruzzo, Lazio	Apennine
11	Tanaro	116 m^{3}/s (4,100 cu ft/s)	Liguria, Piedmont	Alpine
12	Arno	110 m^{3}/s (3,900 cu ft/s)	Tuscany	Apennine
13	Dora Baltea	96 m^{3}/s (3,400 cu ft/s)	Aosta Valley, Piedmont	Alpine
14	Reno	95 m^{3}/s (3,400 cu ft/s)	Emilia-Romagna	Apennine
15	Brenta	93 m^{3}/s (3,300 cu ft/s)	Trentino-Alto Adige/Südtirol, Veneto	Alpine
16	Livenza	85 m^{3}/s (3,000 cu ft/s)	Friuli-Venezia Giulia, Veneto	Alpine
17	Volturno	83 m^{3}/s (2,900 cu ft/s)	Molise, Campania	Apennine
18	Isarco	78 m^{3}/s (2,800 cu ft/s)	Trentino-Alto Adige/Südtirol	Alpine
19	Sesia	70 m^{3}/s (2,500 cu ft/s)	Piedmont	Alpine
20	Tagliamento	70 m^{3}/s (2,500 cu ft/s)	Friuli-Venezia Giulia	Alpine
21	Toce	70 m^{3}/s (2,500 cu ft/s)	Piedmont	Alpine
22	Sele	69 m^{3}/s (2,400 cu ft/s)	Campania	Apennine
23	Mincio	60 m^{3}/s (2,100 cu ft/s)	Veneto, Lombardy	Alpine
24	Velino	60 m^{3}/s (2,100 cu ft/s)	Lazio, Umbria	Apennine
25	Rienza	60 m^{3}/s (2,100 cu ft/s)	Trentino-Alto Adige/Südtirol	Alpine
26	Aterno-Pescara	57 m^{3}/s (2,000 cu ft/s)	Abruzzo	Apennine
27	Sile	55 m^{3}/s (1,900 cu ft/s)	Veneto	Alpine

== Draining into the North Sea ==
- Reno di Lei
  From the artificial Lago di Lei (the barrage itself is part of Switzerland), the Reno di Lei, properly a torrente and not a river, runs for a few kilometers through northern Italy before entering Switzerland again, and drains via the Reno di Avers and the Hinterrhein into the Rhine.

== Draining into the Black Sea ==
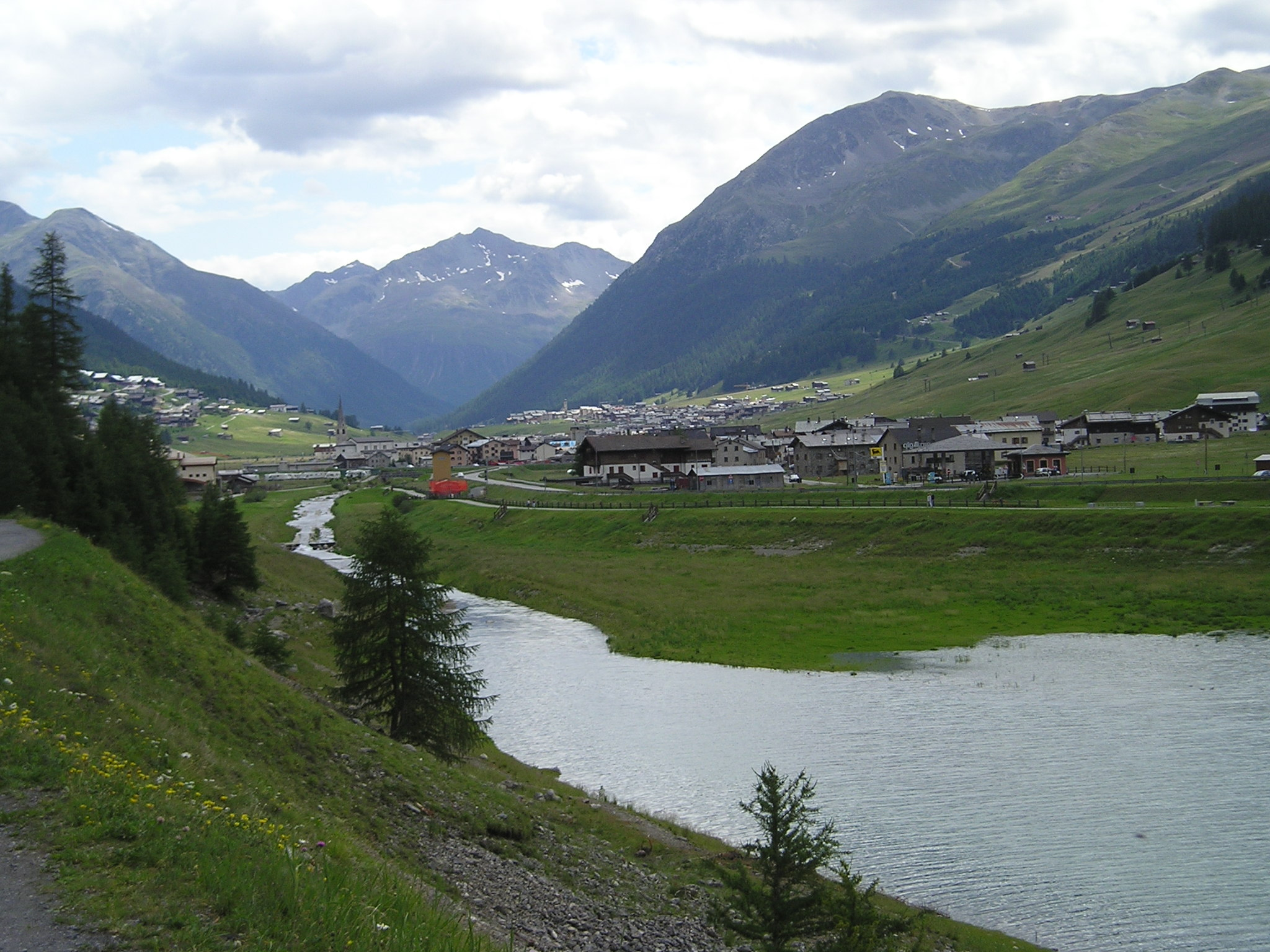
Acqua Granda (or Spöl)

- Drava (a short section in Italy, continues into Austria, Slovenia, Croatia and Hungary)
  The Drava drains into the Danube on the Croatia–Serbia border.
  - Slizza (three-quarters in Italy, a quarter in Austria)
    After entering Austria, the Slizza drains via the Gail into the Drava.
- Acqua Granda (half in Italy, half in Switzerland)
  After entering Switzerland, the Spöl drains into the Inn, which meets the Danube in Germany.

== Draining into the Adriatic Sea ==
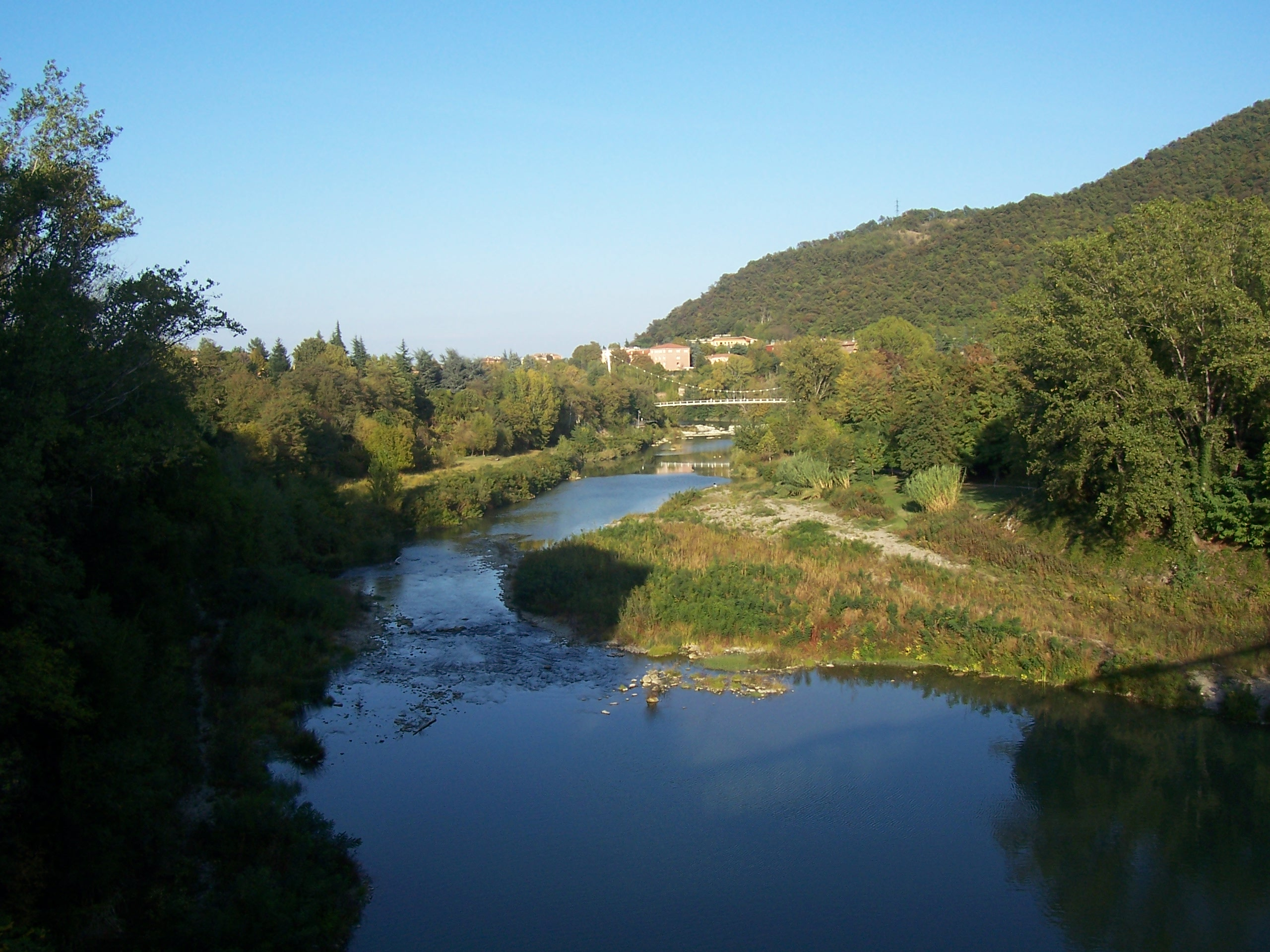
The Reno near Casalecchio

For the purposes of this list, the Italian rivers draining into the Adriatic Sea begin at the coastal border between Italy and Slovenia and follow the Adriatic coast of Italy until it reaches Santa Maria di Leuca. Beyond this point, rivers empty into the Ionian Sea rather than the Adriatic. The rivers are ordered according to how far along the coast the river mouth is from the Italian/Slovenian border, the first river having its mouth the closest to the border and the last being closest to Santa Maria di Leuca.

- Timavo (Reka)
- Isonzo (Soča)
  - Vipacco (Vipava)
  - Torre
    - Natisone
- Cormor
- Ausa
- Tagliamento
- Livenza
- Piave
- Brenta
- Bacchiglione
- Adige
- Tartaro-Canalbianco-Po di Levante
- Po
- Reno
  - Senio
  - Santerno
  - Sillaro
  - Idice
    - Savena
  - Samoggia
  - Limentra di Sambuca
  - Limentra orientale
- Lamone
- Uniti
  - Bidente-Ronco
  - Montone
    - Acquacheta
    - Rabbi
- Savio
- Rubicon
- Marecchia
  - San Marino
- Ausa
- Marano
- Conca
- Foglia
- Metauro
  - Candigliano
    - Biscubio
    - Burano
- Cesano
- Misa
  - Nevola
- Musone
- Potenza
- Chienti
  - Fiastrone
  - Fiastra
- Tenna
- Aso
- Tesino
- Tronto
  - Castellano
- Salinello
- Tordino
- Vomano
  - Fucino
  - Mavone
- Piomba
- Saline
  - Fino
  - Tavo
- Aterno-Pescara
  - Sagittario
    - Gizio
- Alento
- Foro
- Moro
- Sangro
- Trigno
- Biferno
- Fortore
- Carapelle
  - Calaggio
  - Carapellotto
- Ofanto
  - Locone
- Canale Reale

=== Tributaries of the Adige ===
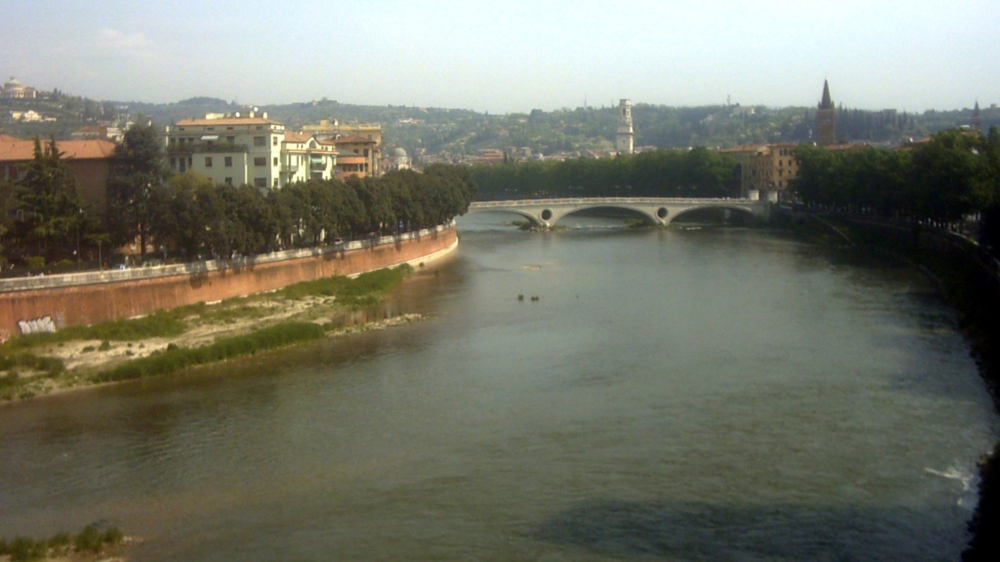
The Adige crossing Verona.

- Avisio
- Eisack
  - Braibach
  - Derjon
  - Eggentaler Bach
  - Pfitscher Bach
  - Pflerscher Bach
  - Plima
  - Ridnauner Bach
  - Rienz
    - Ahr
      - Reinbach
    - Antholzer Bach
    - Gran Ega
    - Gsieser Bach
    - Pragser Bach
    - Pfunderer Bach
  - Talfer
  - Villnößer Bach
- Karlinbach
- Passer
- Rom
- Saldurbach
- Schnalser Bach
- Suldenbach
- Falschauer

=== Tributaries of the Po ===
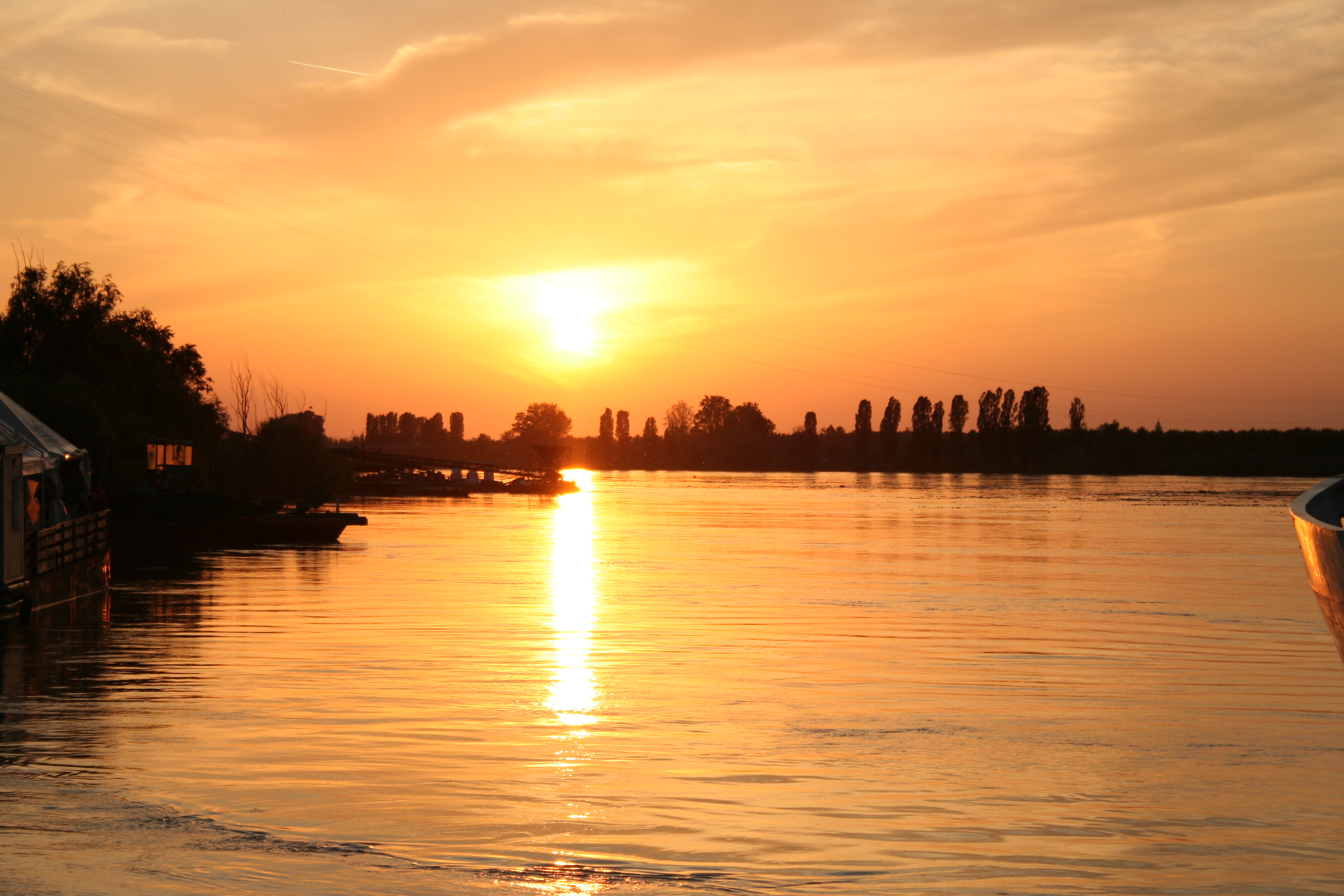
The Po in Boretto (RE).

The tributaries of the Po are organized into right- and left-hand tributaries. The lists are ordered from the river closest to the source of the Po to the river closest to the mouth of the Po.

==== Right-hand tributaries ====
- Varaita
- Maira
- Grana del Monferrato
- Rotaldo
  - Gattola
- Stura del Monferrato
- Tanaro
  - Pesio
  - Ellero
  - Stura di Demonte
    - Gesso
      - Vermenagna
  - Belbo
    - Tinella
  - Borbore
    - Triversa
  - Bormida
    - Bormida di Spigno
    - Orba
      - Piota
        - Gorzente
      - Lemme
      - Stura di Ovada
    - Erro
  - Stura di Demonte
  - Versa
- Staffora
- Scrivia
  - Borbera
  - Grue
  - Brevenna
- Curone
- Trebbia
- Nure
- Arda
- Taro
  - Ceno
  - Stirone
- Parma
  - Baganza
- Enza
- Crostolo
- Secchia
- Panaro

==== Left-hand tributaries ====
- Pellice
  - Chisone
    - Germanasca
- Chisola
  - Lemina
- Sangone
- Dora Riparia
  - Cenischia
  - Dora di Bardonecchia
- Stura di Lanzo
  - Ceronda
- Malone
- Orco
  - Soana
- Dora Baltea
  - Buthier
  - Évançon
  - Lys
  - Chiusella
- Sesia
  - Sessera
    - Strona di Postua
  - Cervo
    - Strona di Mosso
    - Ostola
    - Marchiazza
    - Rovasenda
    - Elvo
- Agogna
  - Erbognone
- Terdoppio
- Ticino
- Olona
- Lambro
- Adda
  - Brembo
    - Enna
    - Parina
    - Stabina
  - Seveso (The Seveso enters the Naviglio Martesana canal which enters the Lambro.)
- Oglio
  - Frigidolfo or Oglio Frigidolfo branch
    - Arcanello or Oglio Arcanello branch
  - Narcanello or Oglio Narcanello branch
  - Valpaghera
  - Valgrande
  - Ogliolo branch
  - Rabbia
  - Remulo
  - Allione (river)
  - Poia (river)
  - Re
  - Re
  - Clegna
  - Figna
  - Blé
  - Palobbia
  - Poia (creek)
  - Re
  - Lanico
  - Trobiolo
  - Grigna
  - Resio
  - Davine
    - Budrio
  - Dezzo
    - Gleno
  - Re
  - Orso
  - Supine
  - Borlezza (The Borlezza enters Lake Iseo which empties into the Oglio.)
  - Rino di Vigolo (The Rino di Vigolo enters Iseo lake which empties into the Oglio.)
  - Rino di Predore (The Rino di Predore enters Iseo lake which empties into the Oglio.)
  - Bagnadore (The Bagnadore enters Iseo lake which empties into the Oglio.)
  - Calchere (The Calchere enters Iseo lake which empties into the Oglio.)
  - Cortelo (The Cortelo enters Iseo lake which empties into the Oglio.)
  - Opelo (The Opelo enters Iseo lake which empties into the Oglio.)
  - Cherio
    - Tadone
    - Malmera
  - Mella
  - Chiese
    - Caffaro (The Caffaro enters Lake Idro which empties into the Chiese.)
    - Re di Anfo (The Re di Anfo enters Lake Idro which empties into the Chiese.)
- Mincio
  - Sarca (The Sarca enters Lake Garda which empties into the Mincio.)
- Versa

=== Rivers draining into Lake Maggiore ===
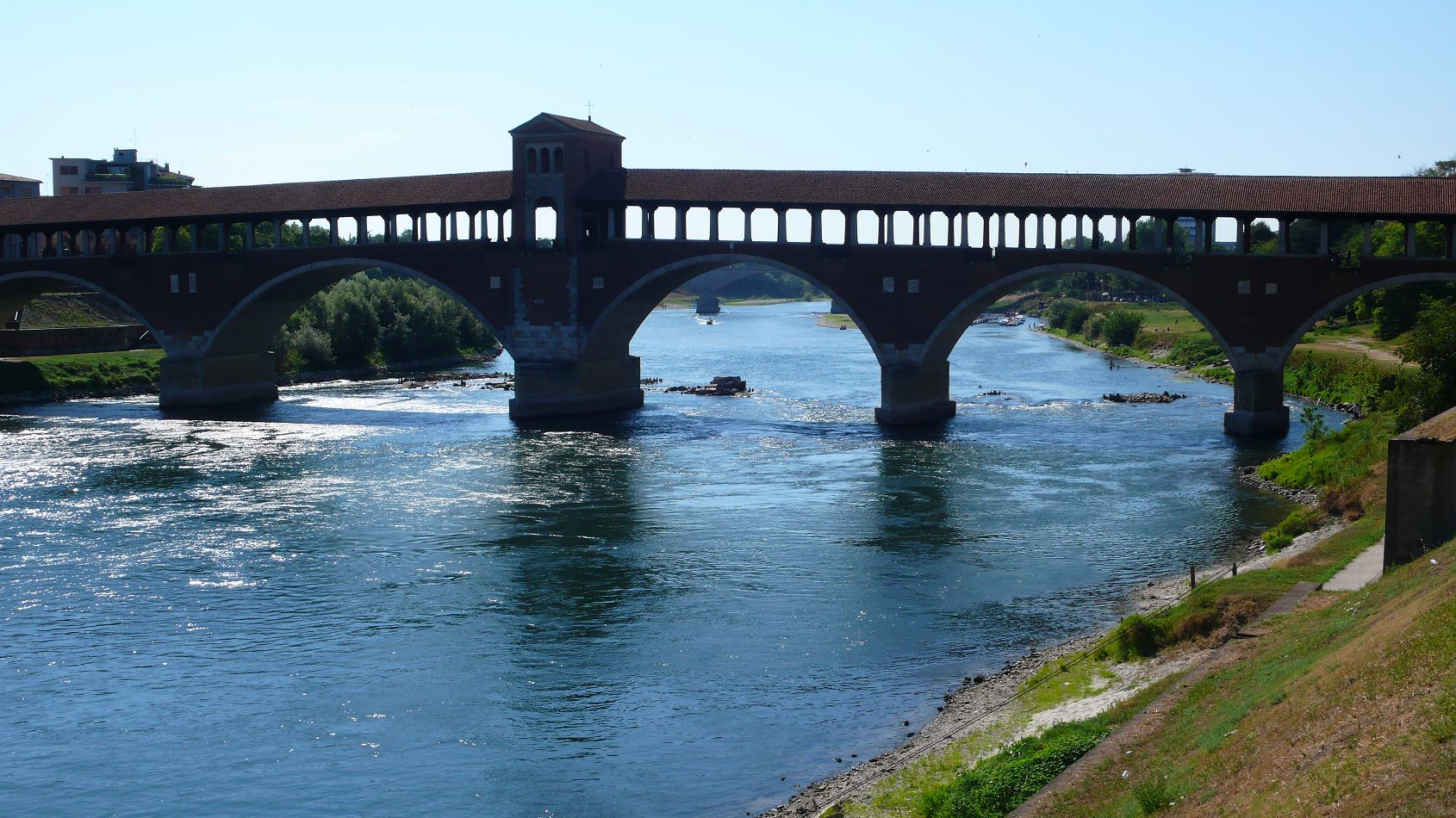
The Ticino and the Ponte Coperto of Pavia

- Boesio
- Cannobino
- Giona
- Maggia (entirely in Switzerland)
  - Melezzo Orientale (partly in Switzerland)
    - Isorno (partly in Switzerland)
- Margorabbia
- San Bernardino
- Stronetta
- Toce
  - Anza
  - Bogna
  - Diveria
  - Melezzo Occidentale
  - Ovesca
  - Strona
    - Nigoglia
- Ticino
- Tresa

=== Rivers draining into Lake Como ===
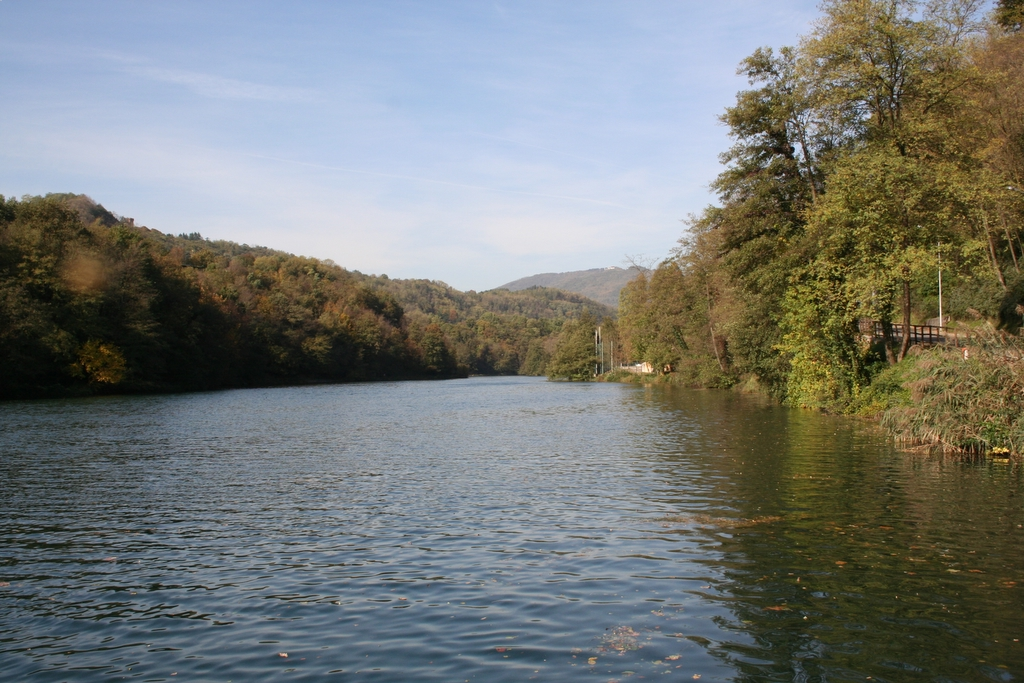
The Adda in Imbersago

- Adda
- Albano
- Breggia
- Cosia
- Fiumelatte
- Liro
- Mera
  - Acquafraggia
  - Liro
- Pioverna

== Draining into the Ionian Sea ==
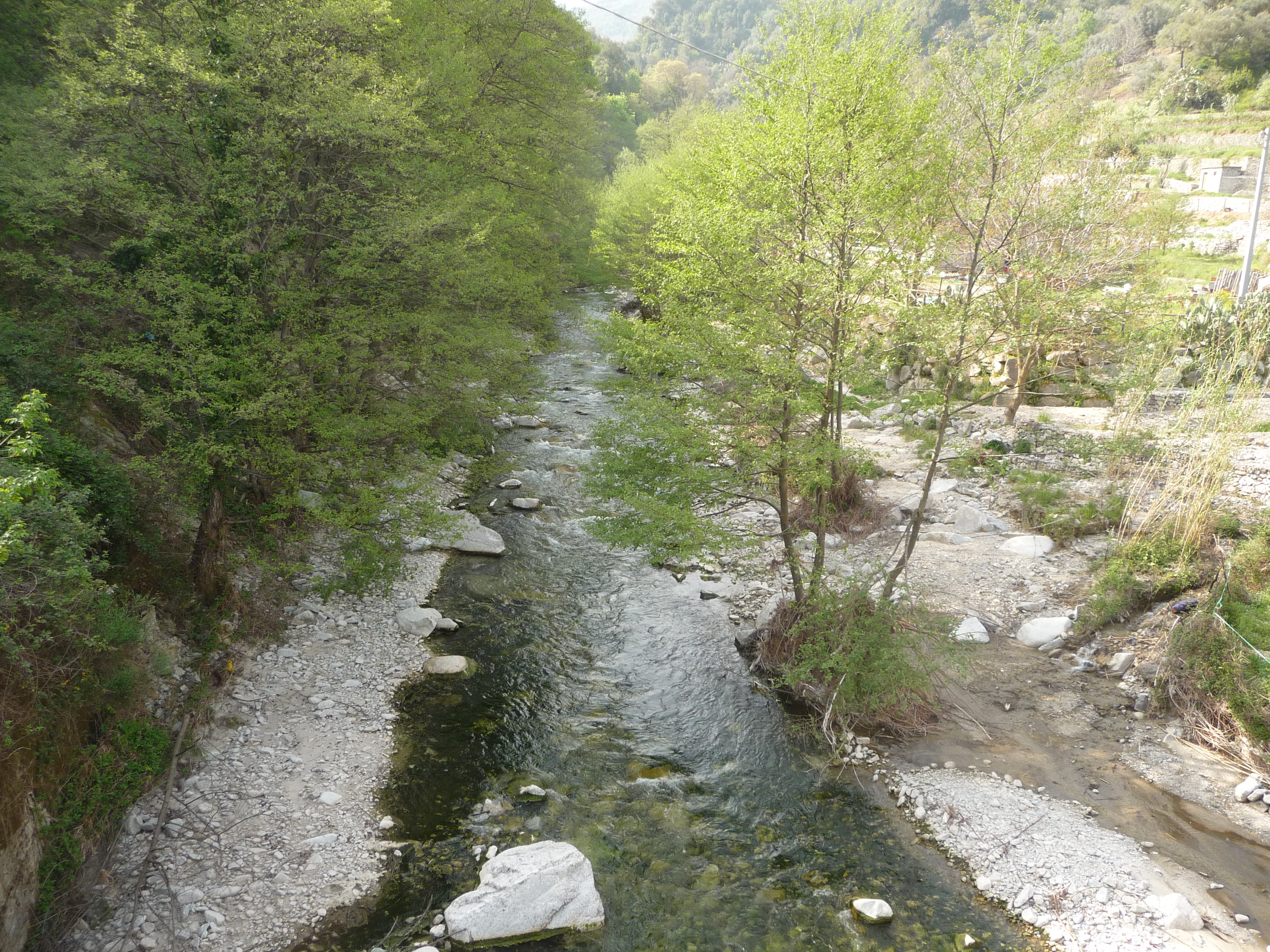
The Stilaro near Bivongi

For the purposes of this list, the Italian rivers draining into the Ionian Sea begin at Santa Maria di Leuca in the east and extend to the Strait of Messina in the west. Sicilian rivers are excluded because they are listed in their own section below. The rivers are ordered according to how far east their mouth is, the first river having the easternmost mouth and the last having the westernmost mouth.

- Lato
- Bradano
  - Alvo
  - Basentello
  - Bilioso
  - Gravina
  - Gravina di Matera
- Basento
- Cavone
  - Salandrella
- Agri
- Sinni
- Crati
  - Busento
  - Coscile
    - Garga
    - Esaro
  - Mucone
- Neto
  - Vitravo
- Esaro
- Stilaro
- Allaro
- Amusa
- Gerace
- Bonamico
- La Verde
- Torno
- Amendolea
- Melito

== Draining into the Tyrrhenian Sea ==
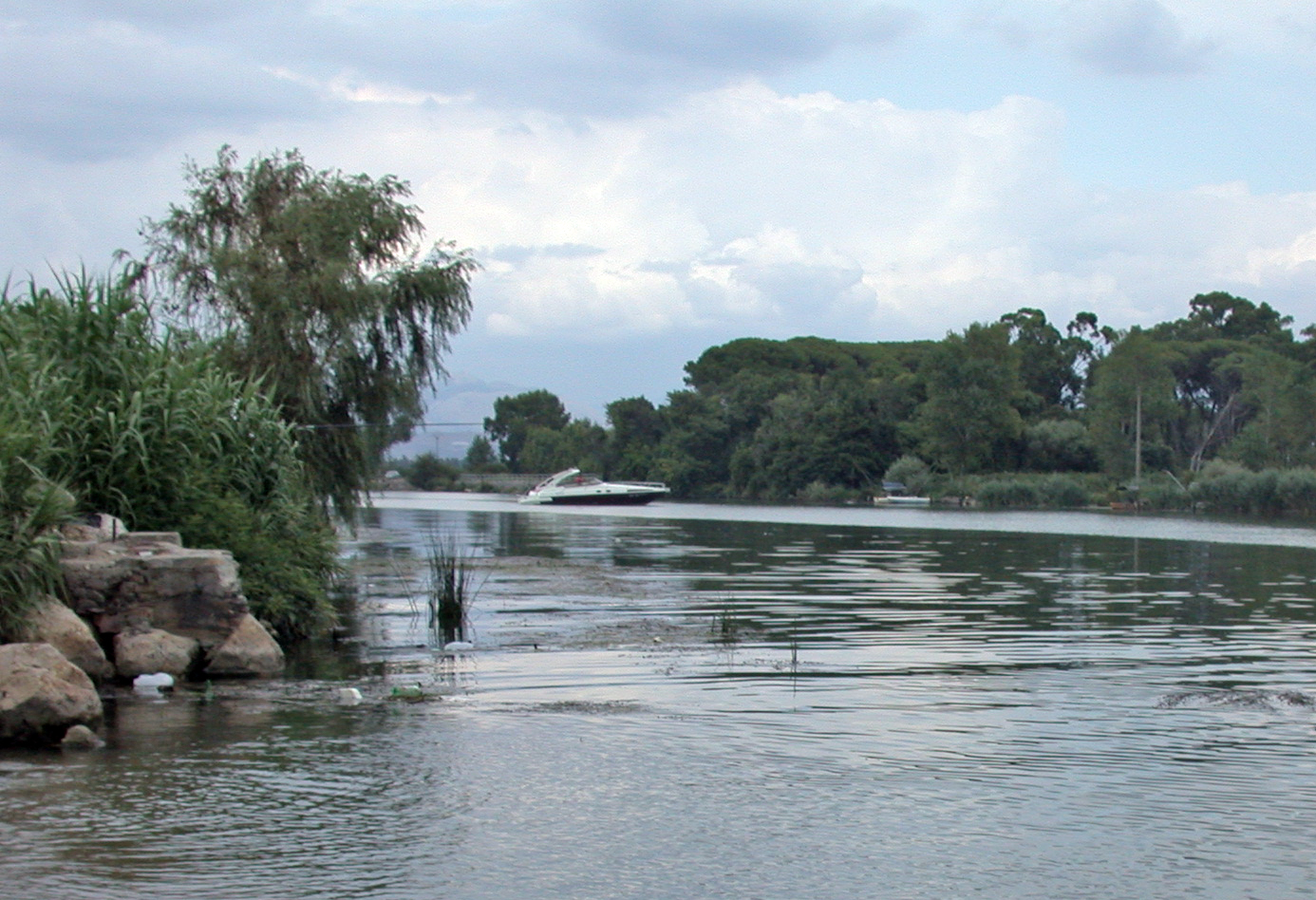
The Garigliano near its mouth

For the purposes of this list, the Italian rivers draining into the Tyrrhenian Sea begin at the Strait of Messina in the south and extend north up to San Pietro Point near Portovenere. Sicilian and Sardinian rivers are excluded from this list because those rivers are in their own sections below. The rivers are ordered according to how far south their mouth is, the first river having the southernmost mouth and the last having the northernmost mouth.

- Marro
- Savuto
- Tusciano
- Sele
  - Calore Lucano
  - Tanagro
- Alento
- Volturno
  - Calore Irpino
    - Sabato
    - Tammaro
    - Ufita
  - Isclero
- Garigliano
  - Liri
    - Sacco
  - Gari
    - Rapido
- Tiber
- Marta
- Arrone
- Fiora
- Ombrone
- Arno
  - Bisenzio
  - Elsa
  - Era
  - Pesa
  - Sieve
- Serchio
- Magra
  - Vara

=== Tributaries of the Tiber ===
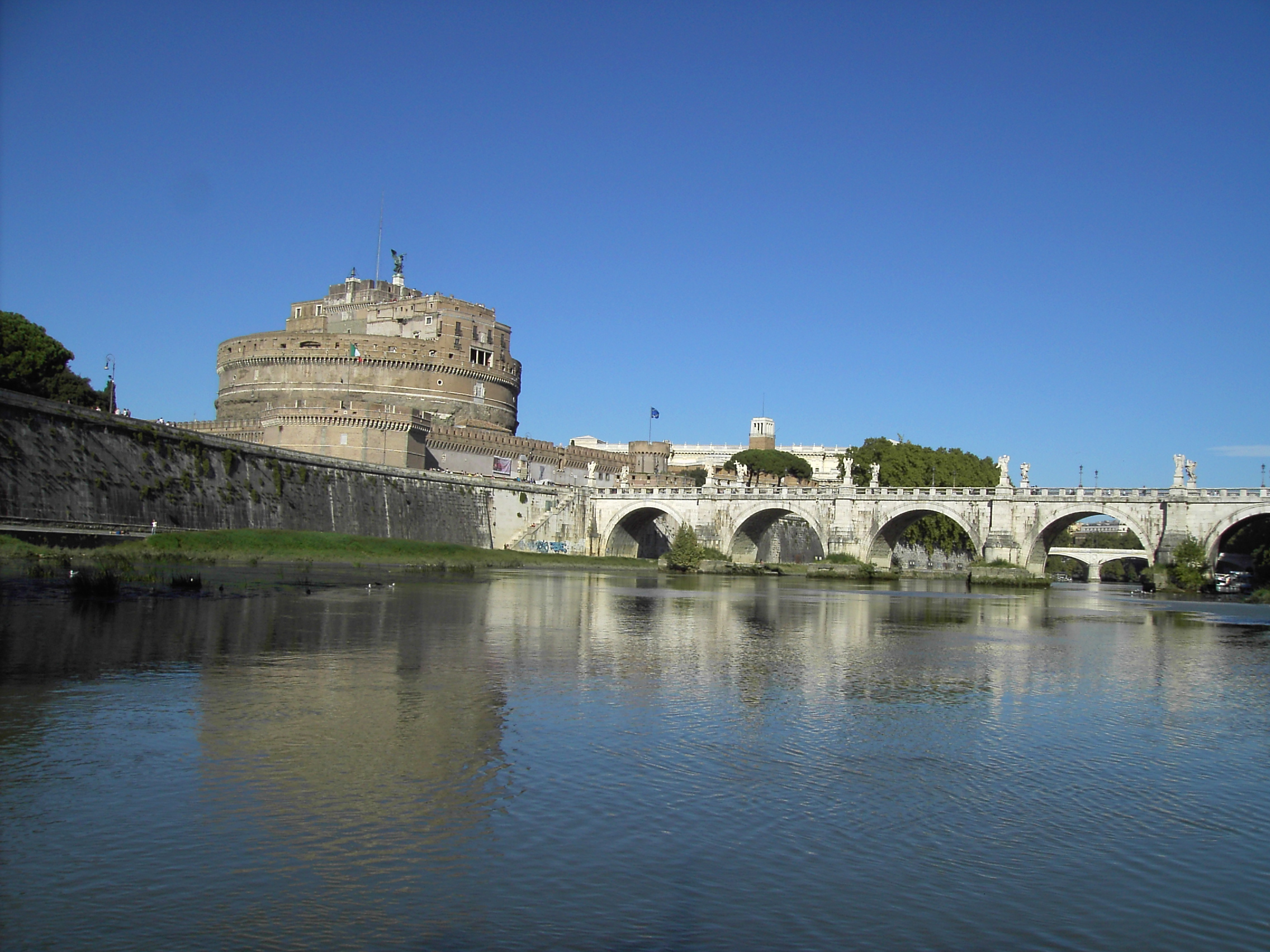
The Tiber: ponte Sant'Angelo (Rome)

- Allia
- Aniene
- Cremera
- Nera
  - Corno
    - Sordo
  - Velino
    - Turano
    - Salto
- Paglia
  - Chiani
- Chiascio
  - Topino
    - Clitunno
    - Ose

== Draining into the Ligurian Sea ==
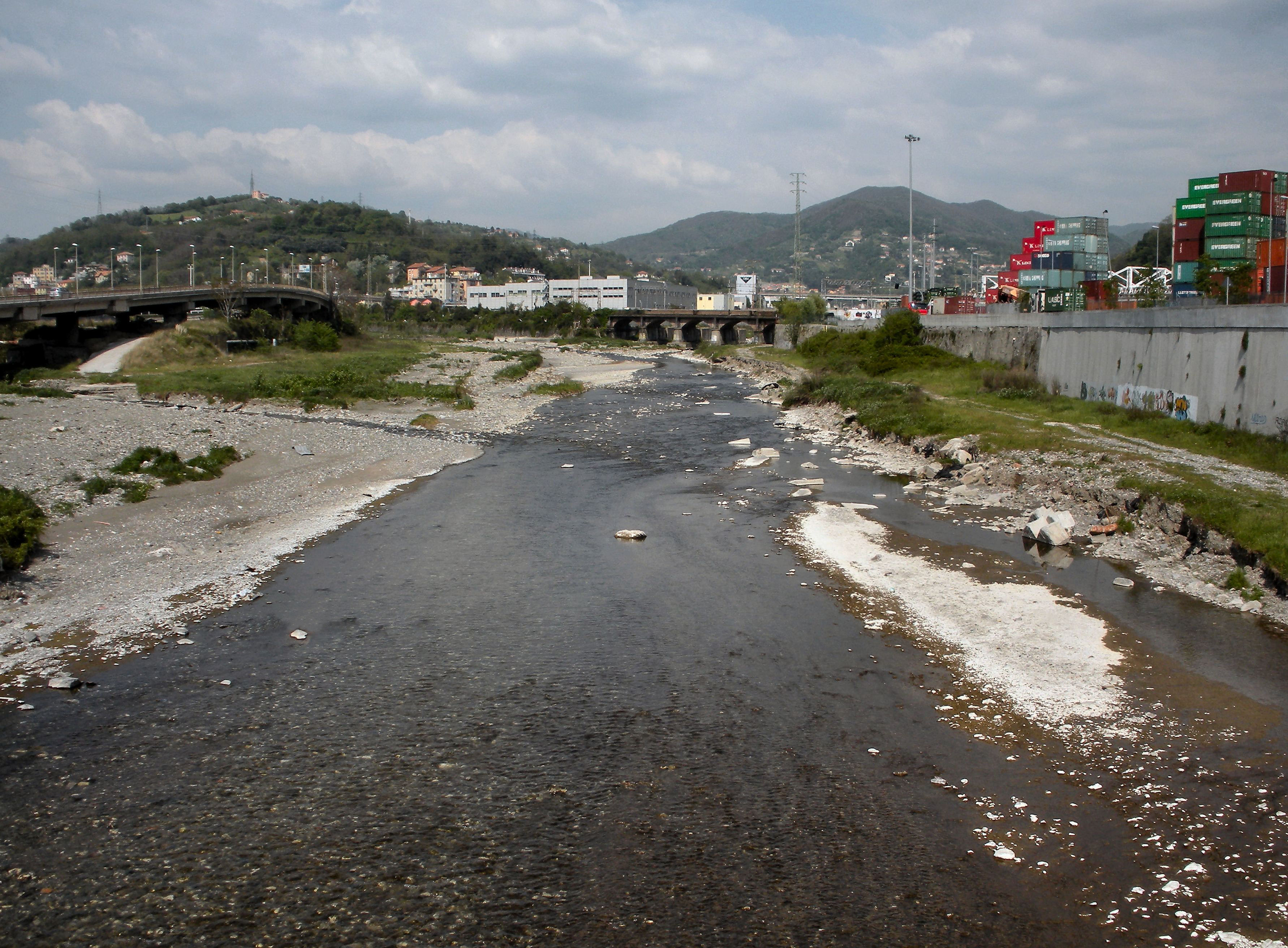
The Polcevera in Bolzaneto (Genova)

For the purposes of this list, the Italian rivers draining into the Ligurian Sea begin at San Pietro Point near Portovenere in the east and extend to the border with France near Monaco. Sardinian rivers are excluded from this list because those rivers are in their own section below. The rivers are ordered according to how close their mouth is to San Pietro Point. The river with its mouth closest to this geographic point is listed first and rivers further away from this point are listed in the order in which their mouth empties into the sea as one proceeds along the coast up to the border with France.

- Entella
  - Lavagna
- Bisagno
- Polcevera
- Cerusa
- Varatella
- Pora
- Centa
  - Arroscia
    - Giara di Rezzo
  - Neva
- Merula
- Steria
- San Pietro
- Impero
- Argentina
- Nervia
  - Barbaira
- Roia (Roya)
  - Bevera (Bévéra)

== Rivers of Sicily ==
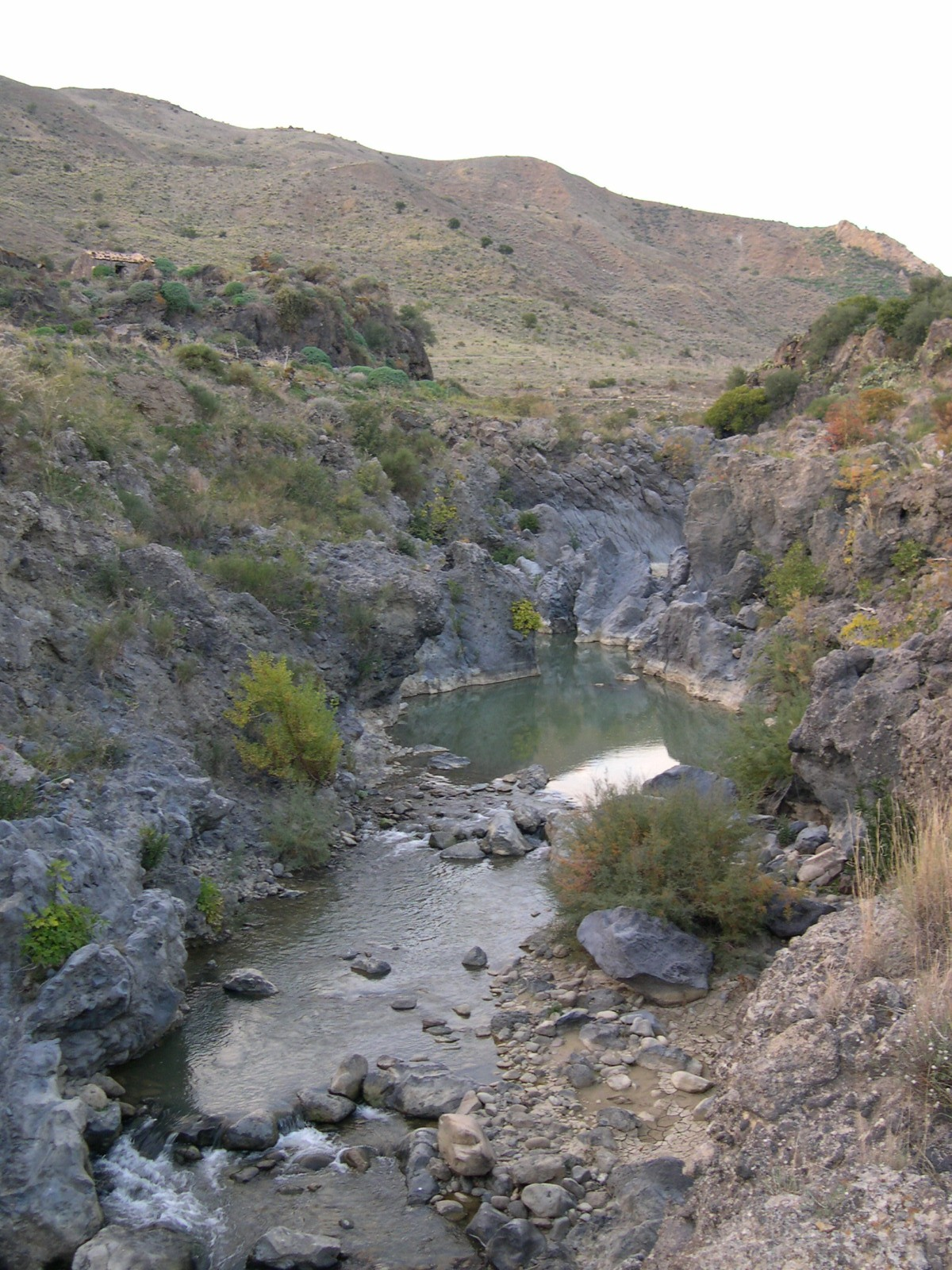
River Simeto

- Alcantara
- Anapo
- Belice
- Calcinara
- Cassibile
- Ciane
- Crinisus
- Dirillo
- Gela
- Helorus
- Imera Settentrionale
- Ippari
- Irminio
- Mazaro
- Platani
- San Leone
- Salso
- Simeto
  - Troina
  - Dittaino
  - Gornalunga
- Verdura

== Rivers of Sardinia ==
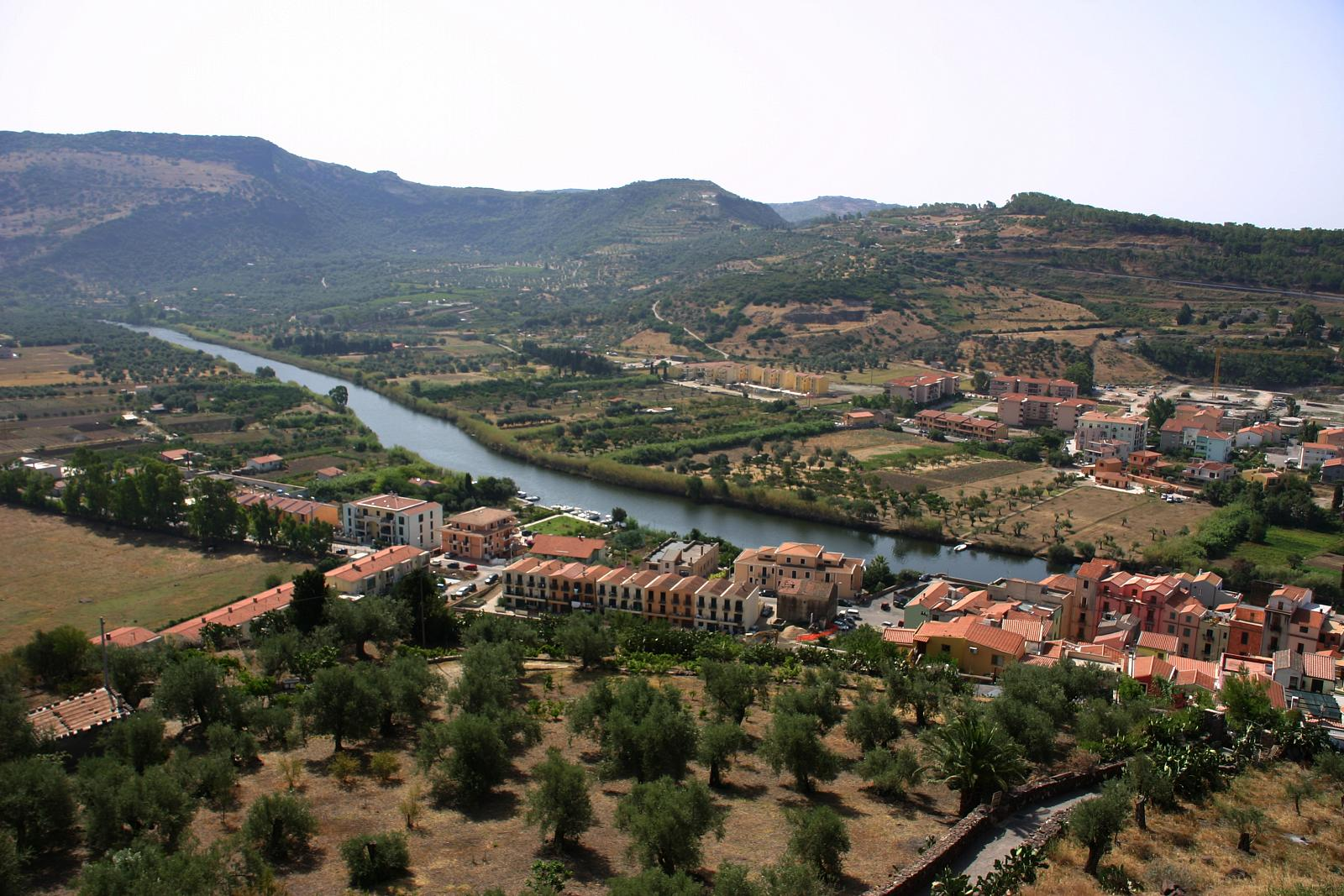
The Temo in Bosa

- Cixerri
- Coghinas
- Flumendosa
- Flumini Mannu
- Temo
- Tirso

== Alphabetical list ==
- Acquacheta
- Acquafraggia
- Adda
- Adige
- Agogna
- Agri
- Ahr
- Albano
- Alcantara
- Allaro
- Allia
- Allione
- Alvo
- Amendolea
- Amusa
- Anapo
- Aniene
- Antholzerbach
- Anza
- Arcanello
- Arda
- Argentina
- Arno
- Arrone
- Arroscia
- Aso
- Aterno-Pescara
- Ausa, in the Province of Udine
- Ausa, in San Marino and the Province of Rimini
- Avisio
- Bacchiglione
- Bagnadore
- Basentello
- Basento
- Barbaira
- Belbo
- Belice
- Bevera (Bévéra)
- Bidente-Ronco
- Biferno
- Bilioso
- Bisagno
- Biscubio
- Blé
- Boesio
- Bogna
- Bonamico
- Borbera
- Borlezza
- Bormida
- Bormida di Spigno
- Bradano
- Braibach
- Breggia
- Brembo
- Brenta
- Budrio
- Burano
- Busento
- Buthier
- Caffaro
- Calaggio
- Calchere
- Calcinara
- Calore Irpino
- Calore Lucano
- Canale Reale
- Candigliano
- Cannobino
- Carapelle
- Carapellotto
- Cassibile
- Castellano
- Cavone
- Cenischia
- Ceno
- Centa
- Cerami
- Cerusa
- Cervo
- Cesano
- Cherio
- Chiana
- Chiani
- Chiascio
- Chienti
- Chiese
- Chisone
- Ciane
- Cixerri
- Clegna
- Clitunno
- Coghinas
- Conca
- Cormor
- Corno
- Cortelo
- Cosia
- Coscile
- Crati
- Cremera
- Crinisus
- Crostolo
- Curone
- Davine
- Derjon
- Dezzo
- Dirillo
- Dittaino
- Diveria
- Dora Baltea
- Dora di Bardonecchia
- Dora Riparia
- Drava
- Eggentaler Bach
- Elvo
- Enna
- Enza
- Entella
- Erbognone
- Erro
- Esaro (Cosenza)
- Esaro (Crotone)
- Fiastra
- Fiastrone
- Figna
- Fiora
- Fiume di Girgenti
- Fiumelatte
- Flumendosa
- Foglia
- Fortore
- Frigidolfo
- Fucino
- Gorzente
- Gran Ega
- Garga
- Garigliano
- Gattola
- Gela
- Gerace
- Giona
- Gleno
- Grana del Monferrato
- Grande River
- Gravina
- Gravina di Matera
- Grigna
- Grue
- Gsieser Bach
- Helorus
- Idice
- Ippari
- Irminio
- Isarco (Eisack)
- Isonzo (Soča)
- Isorno
- Karlinbach
- Lambro
- Lamone
- Lanico
- Lato
- Lavagna
- La Verde
- Lemme
- Limentra di Sambuca
- Limentra orientale
- Liri
- Liro (This Liro enters Lake Como.)
- Liro (This Liro enters the Mera.)
- Livenza
- Locone
- Lys
- Magra
- Maira
- Malmera
- Malone
- Marano
- Marecchia
- Margorabbia
- Marro
- Marta
- Mazaro
- Melezzo Occidentale
- Melezzo Orientale
- Melito
- Mella
- Mera
- Metauro
- Mincio
- Misa
- Montone
- Mucone
- Musone
- Narcanello
- Natisone
- Nera
- Nervia
- Neto
- Nevola
- Nigoglia
- Nure
- Ofanto
- Oglio
- Ogliolo
- Olona
- Ombrone
- Opelo
- Orba
- Orco
- Orso
- Ose
- Ovesca
- Paglia
- Palobbia
- Panaro
- Parina
- Parma
- Passirio
- Pfitscher Bach
- Pflerscher Bach
- Pfunderer Bach
- Piave
- Piomba
- Piota
- Pioverna
- Platani
- Plima
- Po
- Poia (creek)
- Poia (river)
- Polcevera
- Pora
- Potenza
- Pragser Bach
- Rabbi
- Rabbia
- Rapido (Gari)
- Ram (Rom)
- Re di Anfo
- Re, in Gianico
- Re, in Niardo
- Re, in Sellero
- Re di Tredenus, in Capo di Ponte
- Reinbach
- Remulo
- Reno
- Reno di Lei
- Resio
- Ridnauner Bach
- Rienza (Rienz)
- Rino di Predore
- Rino di Vigolo
- Roia (Roya)
- Rotaldo
- Rubicon
- Sacco
- Salandrella
- Saldurbach
- Saline
- Salinello
- Salso
- Salto
- Samoggia
- San Bernardino
- Sangro
- San Marino
- Sant'Anna
- Santerno
- Sarca
- Savena
- Savio
- Savuto
- Scrivia
- Secchia
- Sele
- Senales (Schnalser Bach)
- Serchio
- Sesia
- Seveso
- Sillaro
- Simeto
- Sinni
- Slizza
- Soana
- Sordo
- Spöl
- Stabina
- Staffora
- Stilaro
- Stirone
- Strona
- Stronetta
- Stura del Monferrato
- Stura di Demonte
- Stura di Lanzo
- Stura di Ovada
- Suldenbach
- Supine
- Tadone
- Tagliamento
- Talfer
- Tammaro
- Tanagro
- Tanaro
- Taro
- Tartaro-Canalbianco-Po di Levante
- Tenna
- Terdoppio
- Tesino
- Tiber
- Ticino
- Timavo (Reka)
- Tinella
- Tirso
- Toce
- Topino
- Tordino
- Torno
- Torre
- Trebbia
- Tresa
- Trigno
- Troina
- Tronto
- Turano
- Tusciano
- Uniti
  - Valgrande
  - Valpaghera
- Valsura (Falschauer)
- Vara
- Varaita
- Varatella
- Velino
- Verdura
- Versa (This Versa is a tributary of the Po.)
- Versa (This Versa is a tributary of the Tanaro.)
- Villnößer Bach
- Vipacco
- Vitravo
- Volturno
- Vomano
