= Amusa =

Amusa or AMusA may refer to:

- Amusa (river), in Italy
- Associate in Music, Australia
- Dayo Amusa, Nigerian actress and singer
