= Cerusa =

Stream in Liguria, Italy

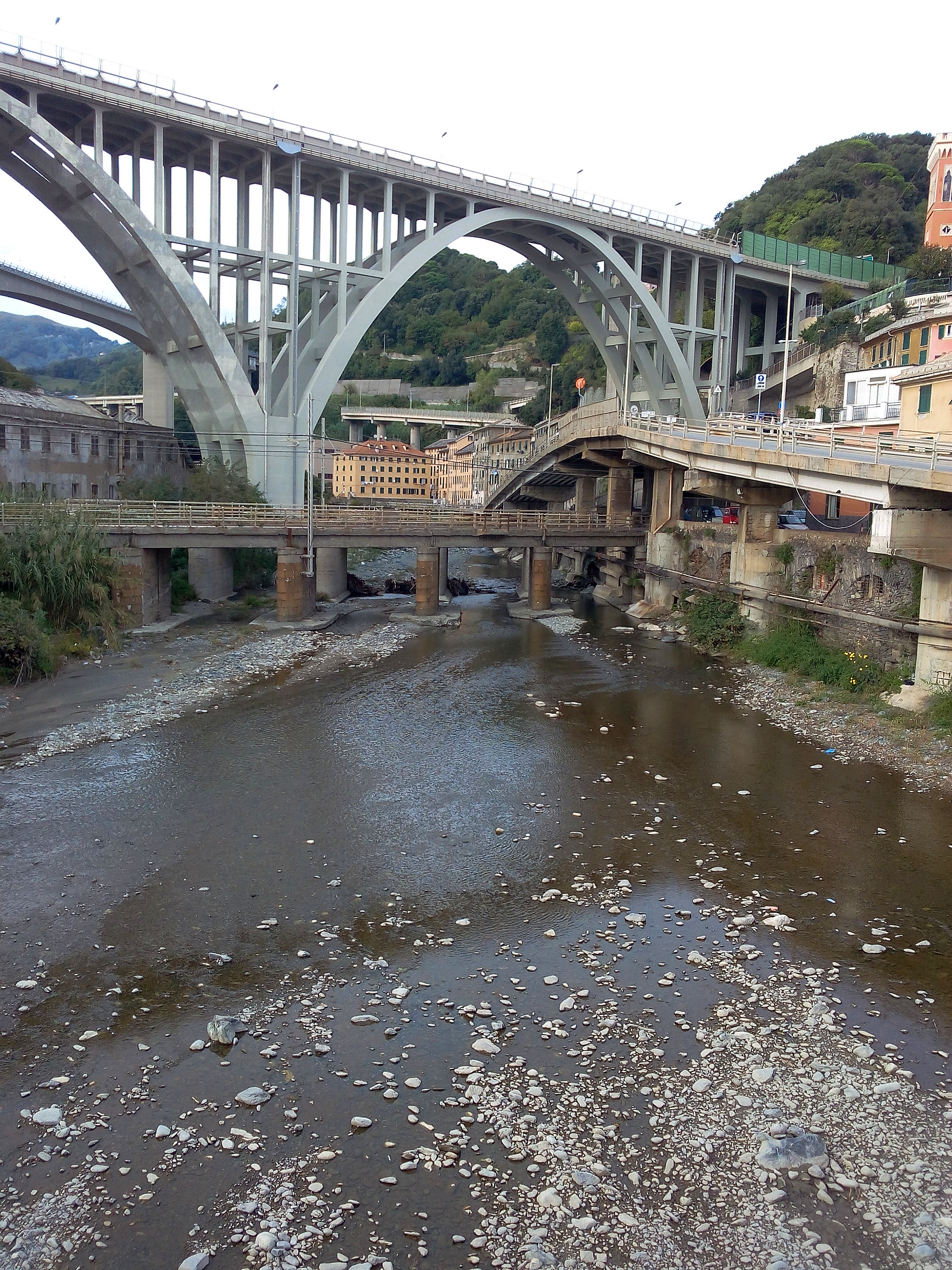

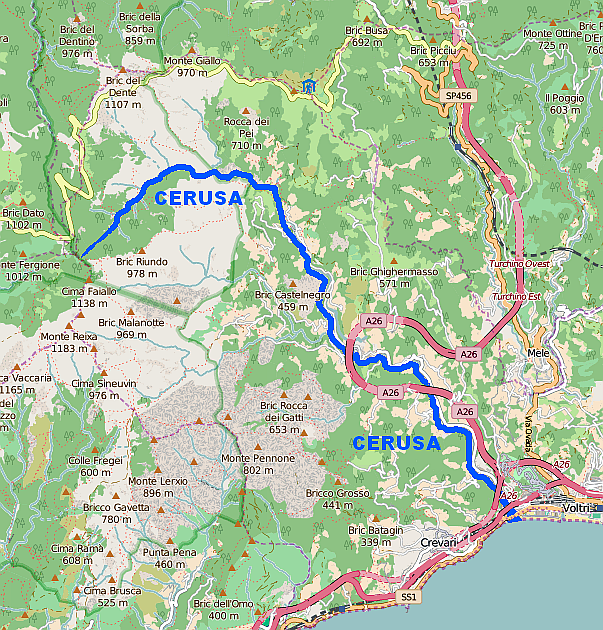

Location
- Country: Italy

Physical characteristics
- Source
  - location: Ligurian Apennines
  - elevation: 376 m (1,234 ft)
- Mouth: Ligurian Sea
  - location: Voltri (GE)
  - coordinates: 44°25′36″N 8°44′34″E
  - elevation: 0 m (0 ft)
- Length: 10.7 km (6.6 mi)
- Basin size: 24 km^{2} (9.3 sq mi)

The Cerusa is a 10.7-kilometre (6.6 mi) stream of Liguria (Italy).

== Geography ==
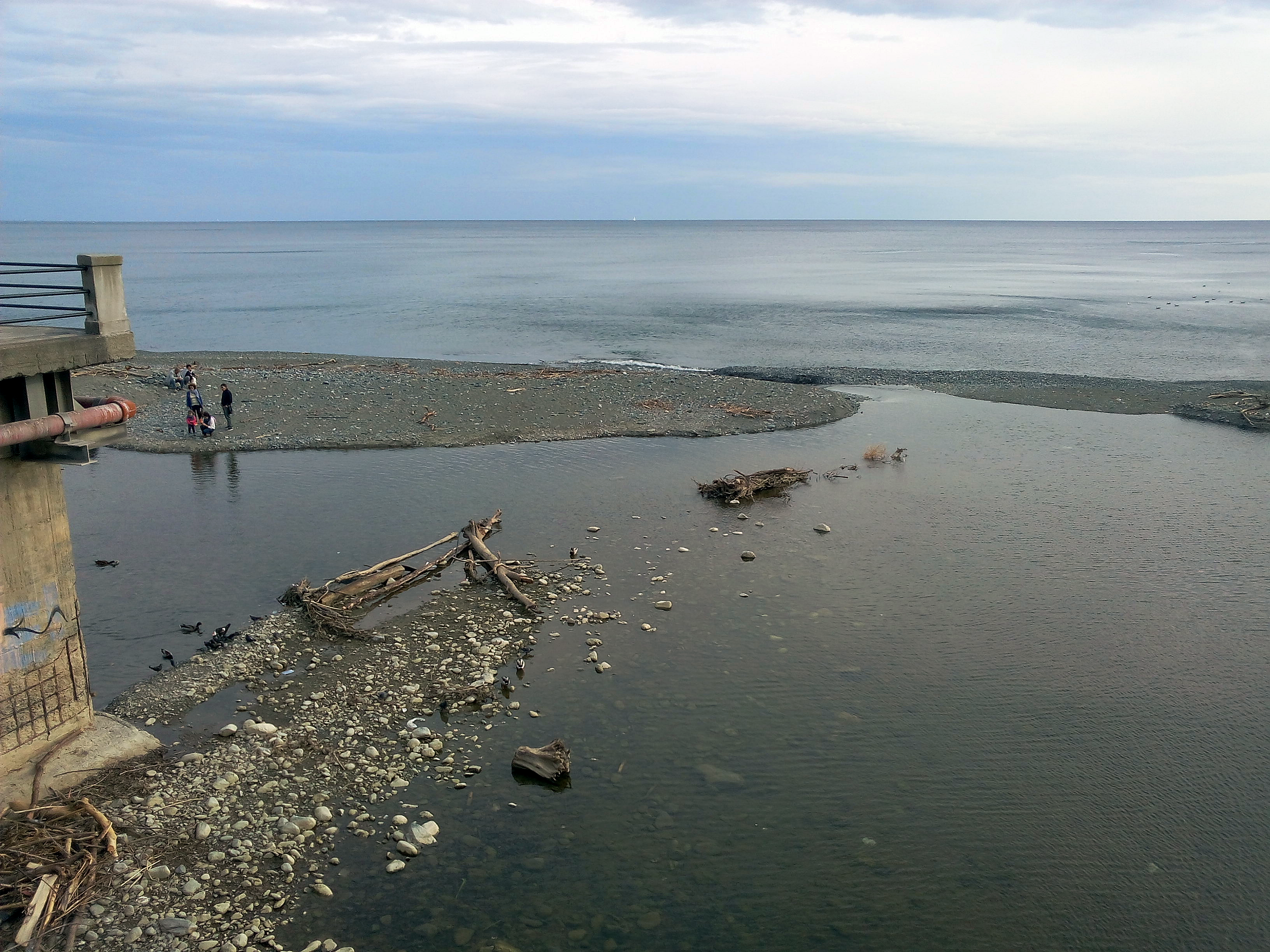
Mouth of the Cerusa

The river is formed at 376 m by the confluence of two streams, Rio Gava and Rio delle Cave, in the Ligurian Apennines. The river then flows through the Valle Cerusa and crosses the villages of Fiorino, Fabbriche di Voltri e Fullo. Heading south reaches Voltri and ends its course in the Ligurian Sea, after being crossed by Autostrada A10, Genoa–Ventimiglia railway and Aurelia national road.

Cerusa basin (24 km2) is totally included in the Province of Genova.

=== Main tributaries ===
- Left hand:
  - Rio delle Cave.
- Right hand:
  - Rio Gava;
  - Rio Secco.

== History ==
The Département de la Ceruse or Dipartimento della Cerusa of Ligurian Republic took its name at the end of the 18th century from the stream.

== See also ==
- List of rivers of Italy

Media related to Cerusa at Wikimedia Commons
