= Suldenbach =

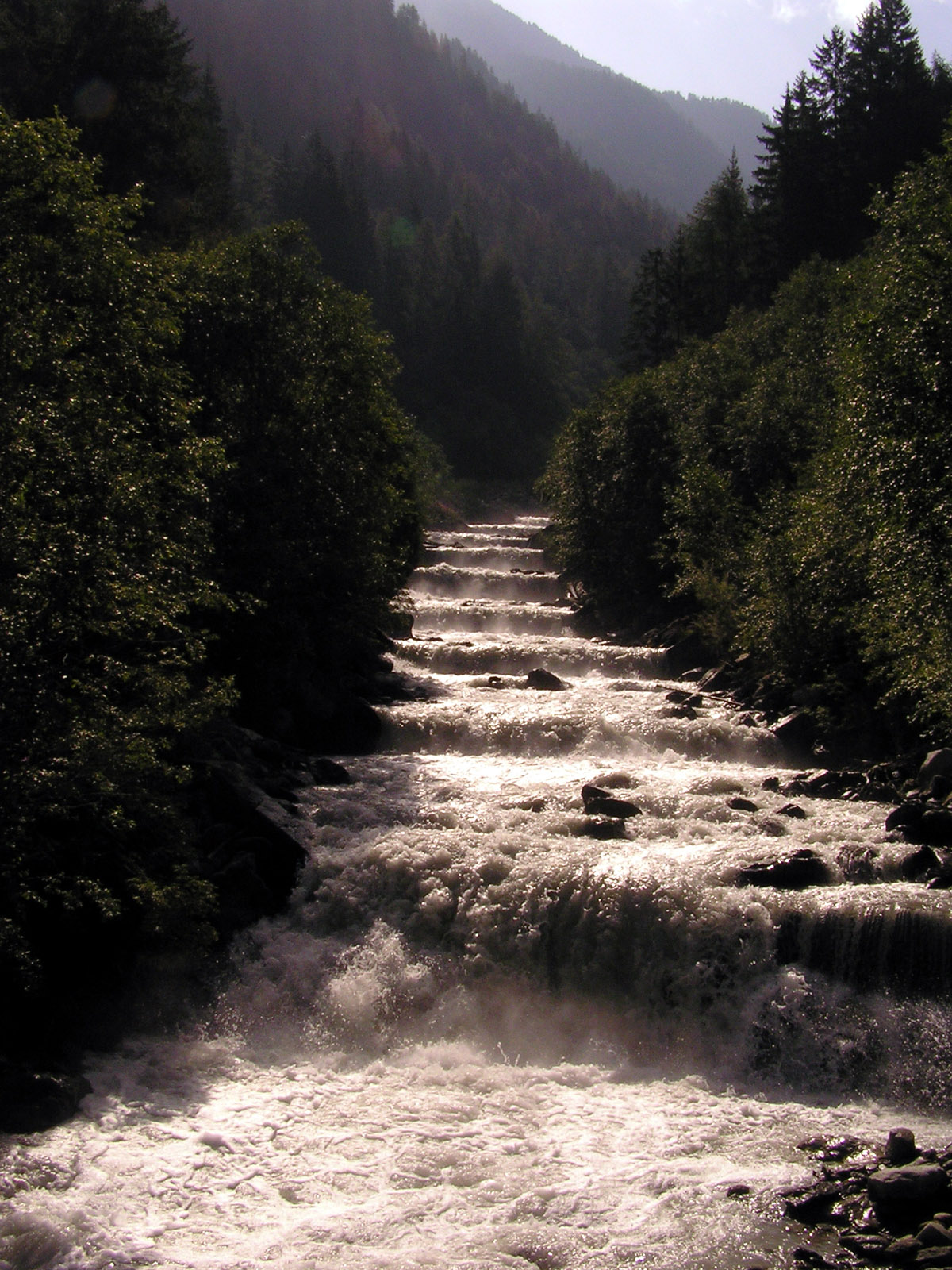
- The Suldenbach shortly upstream of its confluence with the Trafoier Bach

Location
- Country: Italy

Physical characteristics
- Source
  - location: Ortler-Monte Cevedale
- Mouth: Adige
  - coordinates: 46°37′59″N 10°36′42″E
  - elevation: 884 m (2,900 ft)
- Length: 21.4 km (13.3 mi)
- Basin size: 161 km^{2} (62 sq mi)

Basin features
- Progression: Adige→ Adriatic Sea

The Suldenbach (Italian: Rio Solda) is a stream located in South Tyrol, Italy. It flows into the Adige in Prad am Stilfser Joch.
