= Saldurbach =

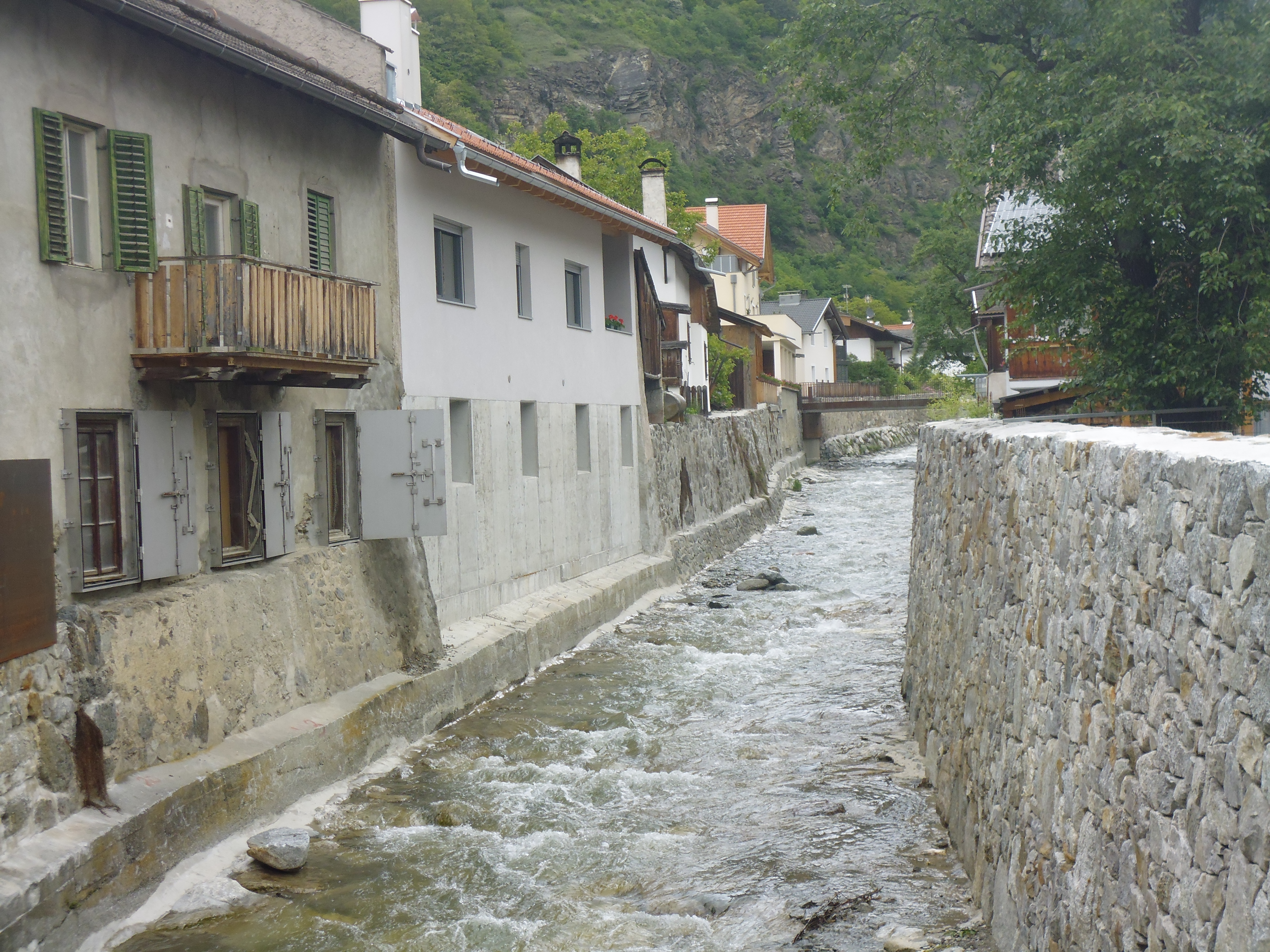

Location
- Country: Italy

Physical characteristics
- Source
  - location: Matscher Tal
- Mouth: Punibach
  - coordinates: 46.6461°N 10.5847°E
- Length: 21.6 km (13.4 mi)
- Basin size: 100 km^{2} (39 sq mi)

Basin features
- Progression: Punibach→ Adige→ Adriatic Sea

The Saldurbach (Italian: Saldura) is a stream located in South Tyrol, Italy. It flows into the Punibach close to its confluence with the Adige near Prad am Stilfser Joch.
