= La Verde (river) =

Location
- Country: Italy

Physical characteristics
- Source
  - location: Montalto
- Mouth: Ionian Sea
  - coordinates: 38.0581°N 16.1484°E
- Basin size: 117 km^{2} (45 sq mi)

La Verde (possibly Ancient Greek: Καϊκῖνος, romanized: Kaïkinos) is an Italian river whose source is on Montalto in the Aspromonte National Park, in Calabria, southern Italy. From there, the river flows southeast and then flows east before emptying into the Ionian Sea north of Cape Bruzzano. It has a drainage basin of 117 square kilometres (45 sq mi).
