= Cormor =

Coordinates: 45°46′N 13°08′E

- Native name: Cormôr (Friulian); Carmò (Friulian); Cormour (Friulian)

Location
- Country: Italy
- Location: Friuli-Venezia Giulia

Physical characteristics
- Source
  - location: West of Fagagna and east of Spilimbergo
- Mouth
  - location: Laguna di Marano in the Adriatic Sea

The Cormor is an Italian river in the Province of Udine. The source of the river is west of Fagagna and east of Spilimbergo. The river initially flows south but then curves east and flows past Martignacco. The river then flows south past Udine until it empties into the Laguna di Marano in the Adriatic Sea.
