= Cosia =

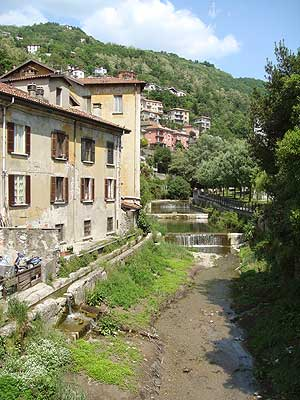

Location
- Country: Italy

Physical characteristics
- Source
  - location: Monte Bollettone
- Mouth
  - location: Lake Como, at Como
  - coordinates: 45.8153°N 9.0744°E
- Length: 16 km (9.9 mi)

Basin features
- Progression: Lake Como→ Adda→ Po→ Adriatic Sea

The Cosia is a 16 kilometres (9.9 mi) torrent whose springs are on the slopes of Monte Bolletone (1,317 metres (4,321 ft)) in Brianza, Italy. Its course takes it through the communities of Albese con Cassano, Tavernerio and Como, then it enters Lake Como near the war memorial designed by Antonio Sant'Elia and executed by Giuseppe Terragni. The river has two tributaries: the Valloni on the left and the Tisone on the right.

The few fish which the river supports are mostly souffia, members of the carp family.

On 14 October 1607 the Cosia caused disastrous floods at Como which the historian Primo Tatti described in his life of Saint Giovanni da Meda: the monasteries of Santa Chiara and Santa Margherita were destroyed, as was the Collegio Gallio, together with its church which held the remains of the saint, and the church of Rondinetto which was rebuilt on a new site.

== Notes ==
This article originated as a translation of this version of its counterpart on the Italian Wikipedia.
