= Plima =

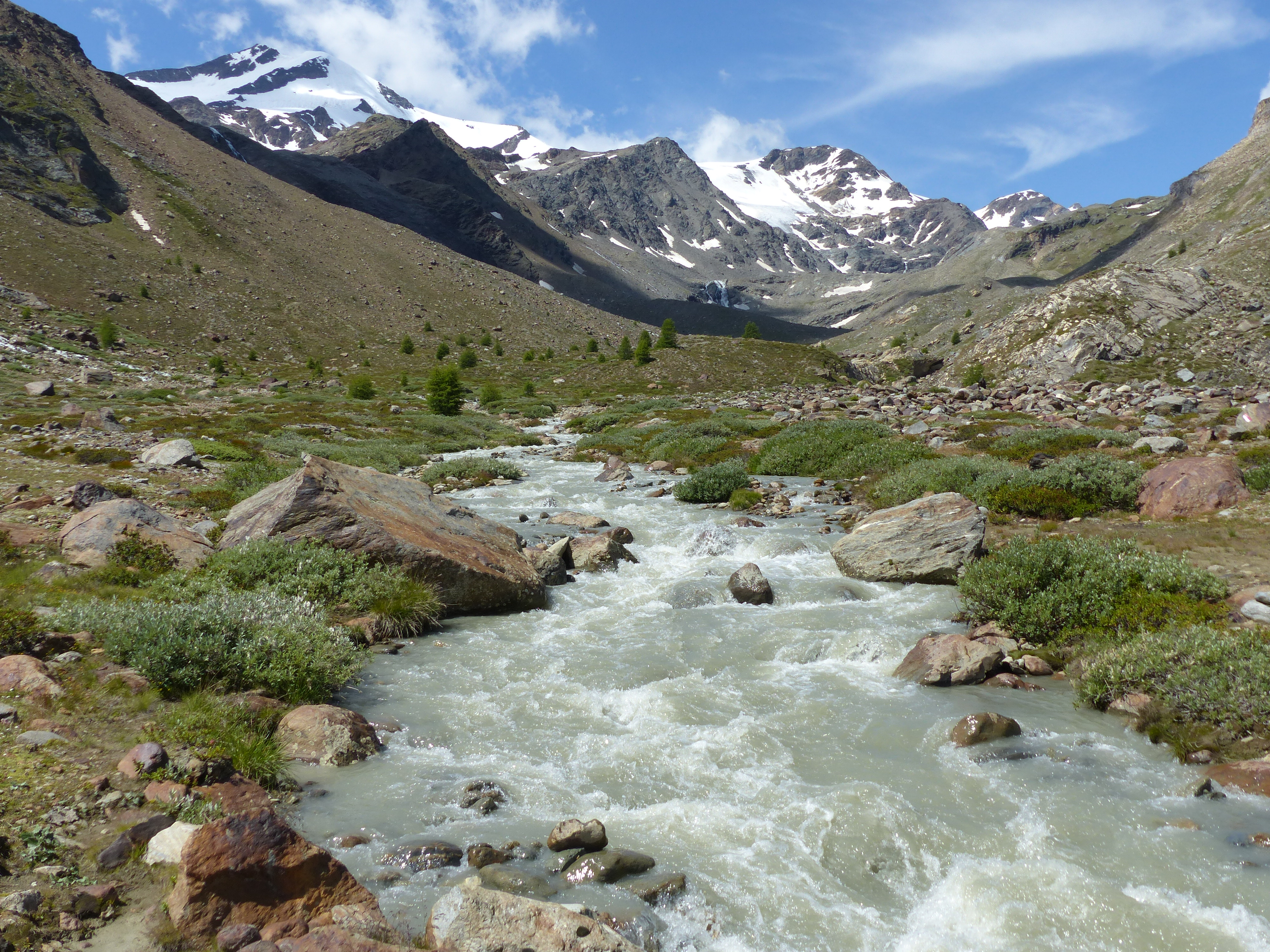

Location
- Country: Italy

Physical characteristics
- Source
  - location: Martelltal (South Tyrol)
- Mouth: Adige
  - coordinates: 46°37′08″N 10°50′17″E
  - elevation: 650 m (2,130 ft)
- Length: 28.5 km (17.7 mi)
- Basin size: 162 km^{2} (63 sq mi)

Basin features
- Progression: Adige→ Adriatic Sea

The Plima (Italian: Rio Plima; German: Plima) is a stream in South Tyrol, Italy. It flows into the Adige near Latsch.
