= Allaro =

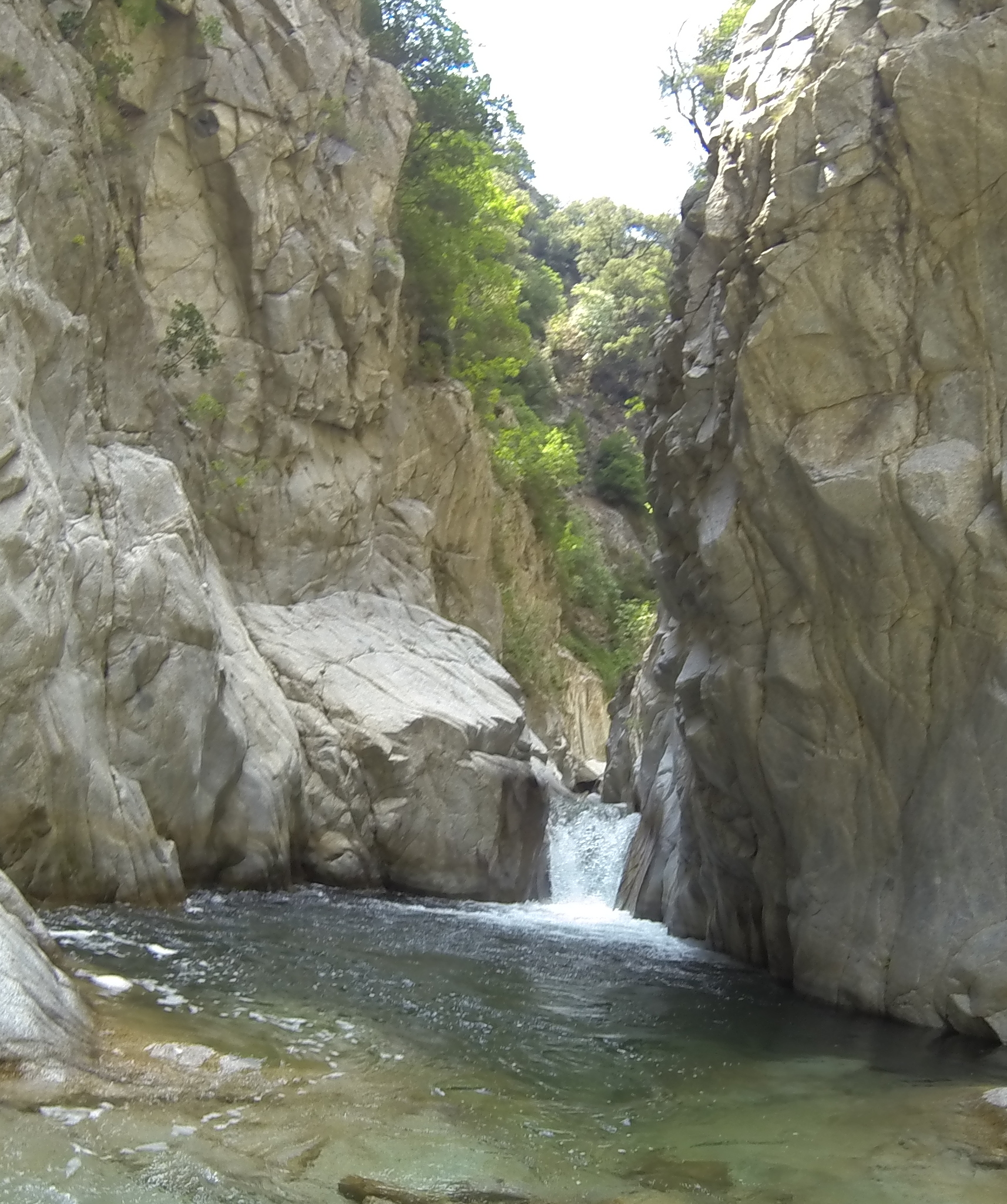

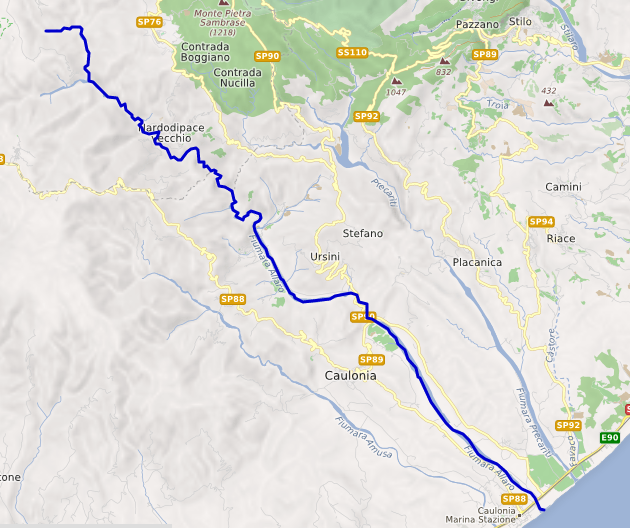

Location
- Country: Italy

Physical characteristics
- Mouth: Ionian Sea
  - coordinates: 38.3447°N 16.4758°E

The Allaro (Calabrian dialect Alaru) is a river in Calabria, Southern Italy. It flows into the Ionian Sea at Marina di Caulonia. It gives its name to the valley through which it runs (Vallata dello Stilaro Allaro) and is a candidate for the site of the ancient river Sagra.
