= Schnalser Bach =

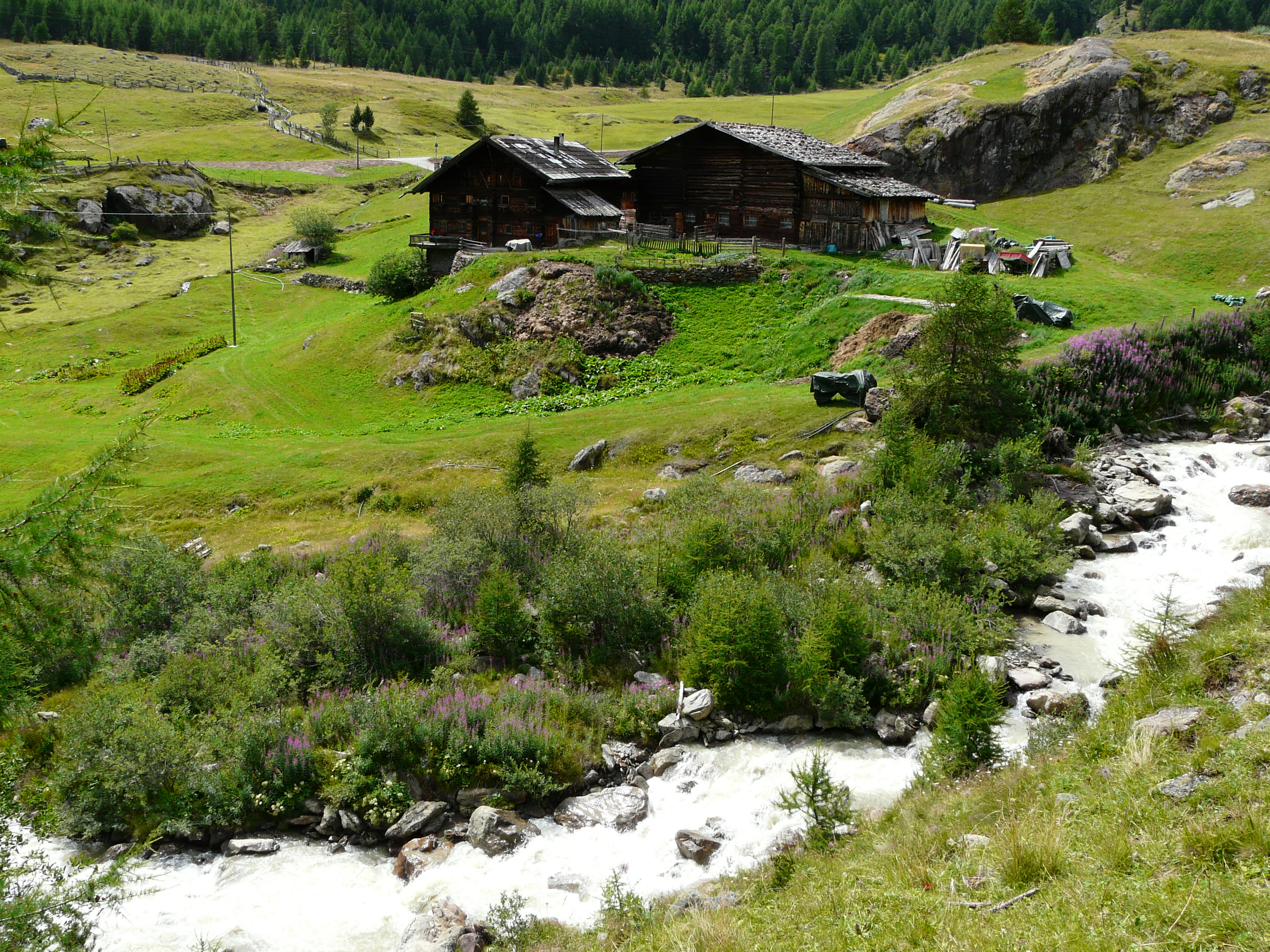
- Schnalser Bach with farm Köflhöfen

Location
- Country: Italy

Physical characteristics
- Source
  - location: Schnalstal
- Mouth: Adige
  - location: near Naturns
  - coordinates: 46.6473°N 10.9768°E
- Length: 25.7 km (16.0 mi)
- Basin size: 220 km^{2} (85 sq mi)

Basin features
- Progression: Adige→ Adriatic Sea

The Schnalser Bach (Italian: Rio Senales) is a stream located in South Tyrol, Italy. It flows into the Adige near Naturns.
