= Torno (river) =

Location
- Country: Italy

Physical characteristics
- Source
  - location: Aspromonte National Park
- Mouth: Ionian Sea
  - coordinates: 37.9817°N 16.1161°E

The Torno is an Italian river whose source is in Aspromonte National Park. From there, the river flows southeast and empties into the Ionian Sea north of Brancaleone.
