= Braibach =

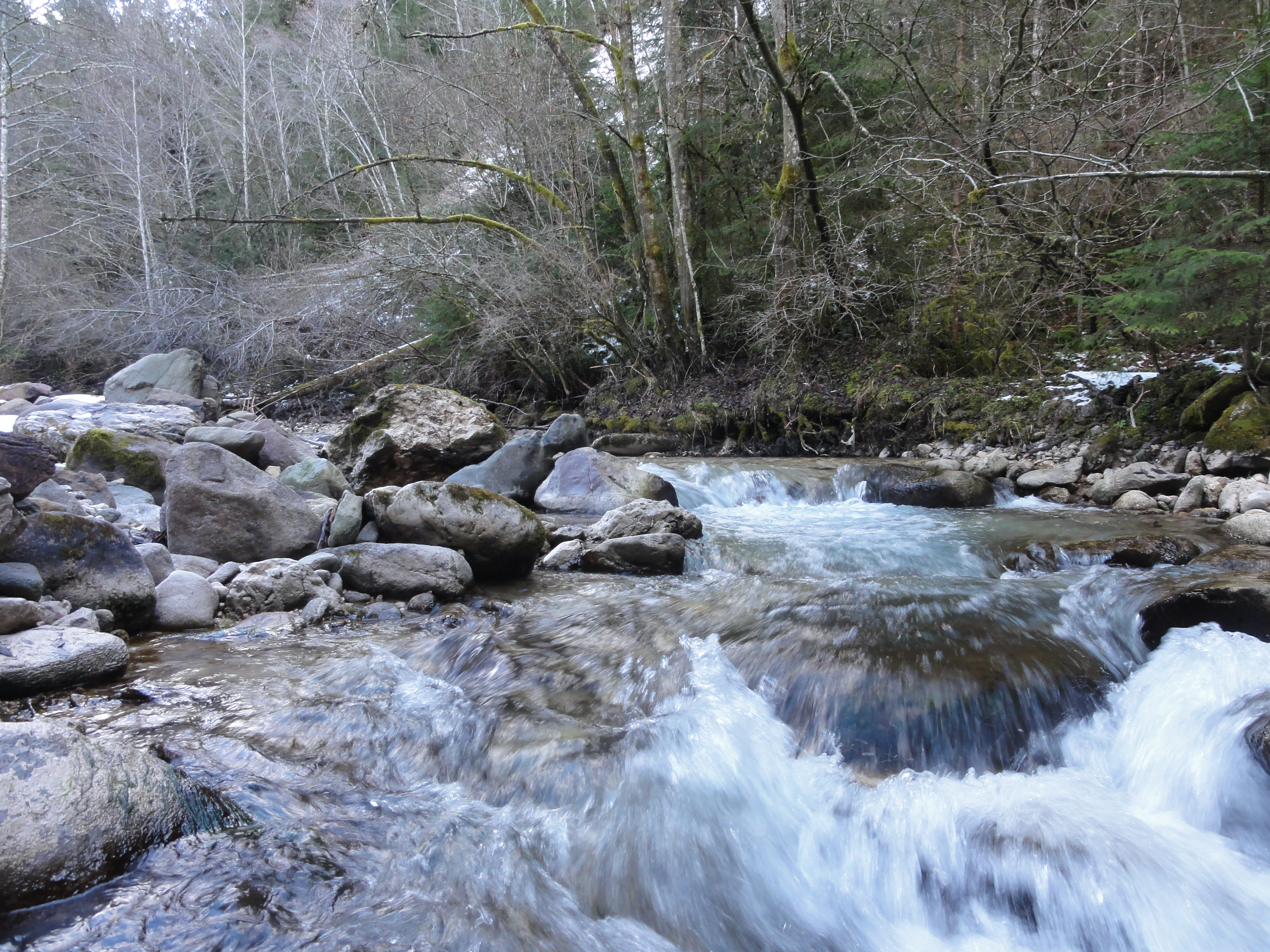

Location
- Country: Italy

Physical characteristics
- Source
  - location: Tierser Tal (South Tyrol)
- Mouth: Eisack
  - coordinates: 46.4971°N 11.4493°E
- Length: 15.2 km (9.4 mi)
- Basin size: 63 km^{2} (24 sq mi)

Basin features
- Progression: Eisack→ Adige→ Adriatic Sea

The Braibach or Tierser Bach (also Breibach, Breienbach, Braienbach) is a stream in South Tyrol, Italy.
