= Esaro (Crotone) =

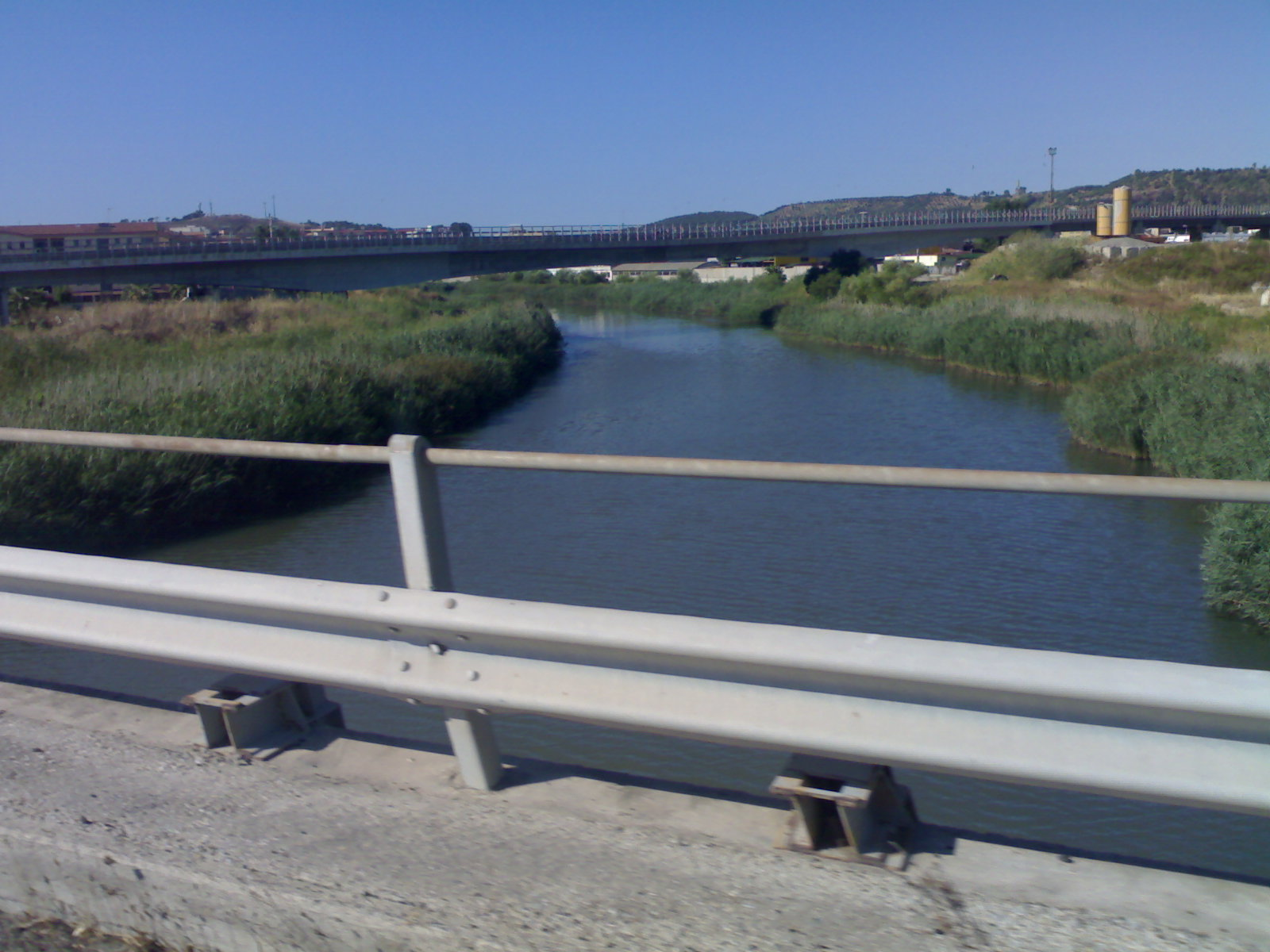

Location
- Country: Italy
- Region: Calabria
- Province: Crotone

Physical characteristics
- Source: near Cutro
  - elevation: 300 m
- Mouth: Ionian Sea
  - location: Crotone
  - coordinates: 39.0908°N 17.1156°E
- Length: 20 km (12 mi)
- Basin size: 110 km^{2} (42 sq mi)
- Discharge
  - average: 0.6 m^{3}/s (21 cu ft/s)

The Esaro (Latin: Aesarus) is a river in the province of Crotone, Calabria, southern Italy. Its source is near Cutro. The river flows southeast near Crotone Airport before curving northeast and eventually flowing into the Ionian Sea just north of Crotone.
