= Canale Reale =

Location
- Country: Italy

Physical characteristics
- Source
  - location: near Francavilla Fontana
- Mouth: Adriatic Sea
  - location: near the Strait of Otranto
  - coordinates: 40.7048°N 17.8069°E

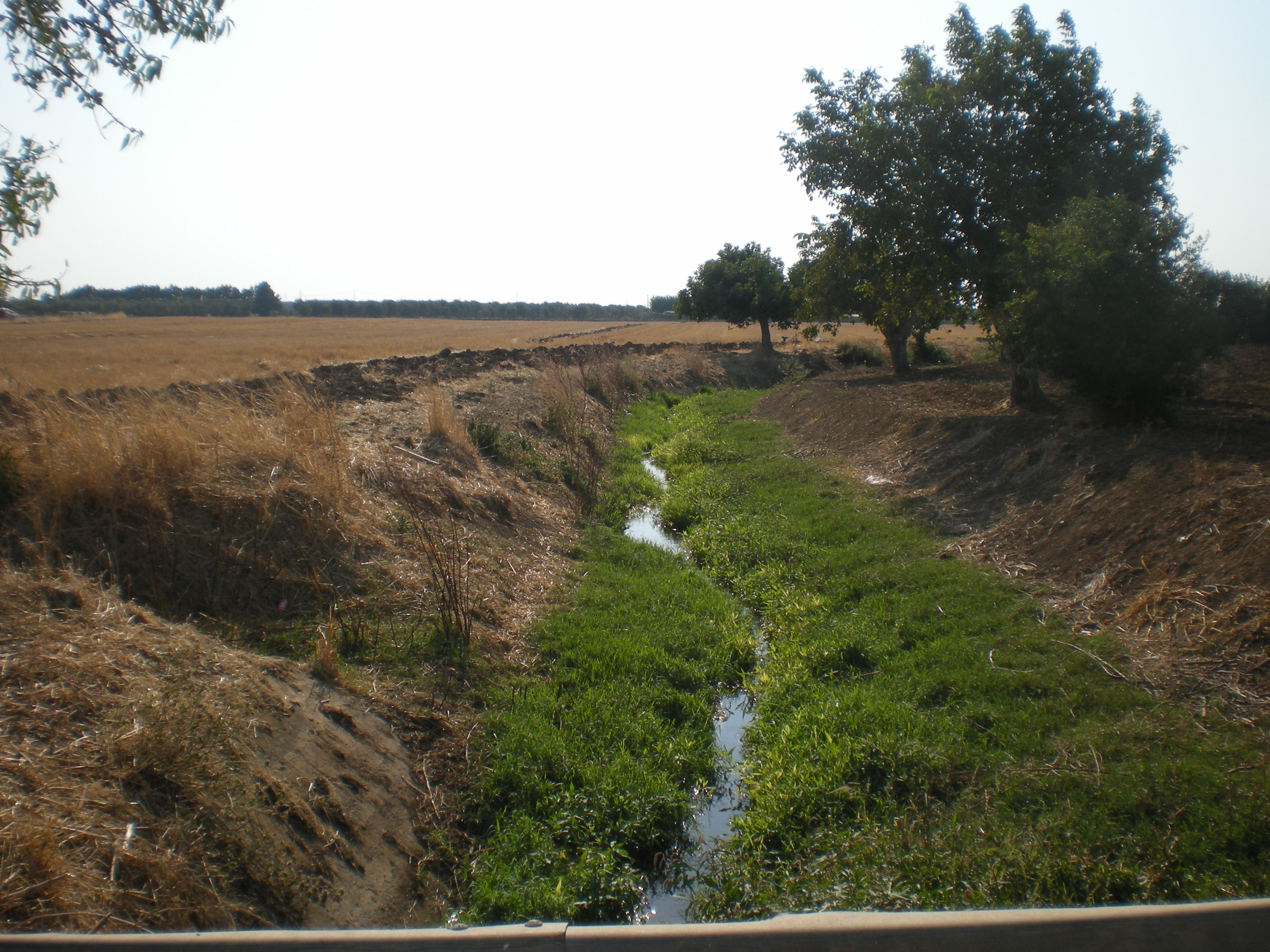

Canale Reale is an Italian river in the province of Brindisi. The source of the river is near Francavilla Fontana. The river flows east for a distance before curving northeast near Latiano. It enters the Adriatic Sea near the Strait of Otranto between Villanova and Brindisi.
