= Melito (river) =

Location
- Country: Italy

Physical characteristics
- Source
  - location: Aspromonte National Park
- Mouth: Ionian Sea
  - coordinates: 37.9171°N 15.7920°E

The Melito (possibly Latin: Halex) is an Italian river whose source is in Aspromonte National Park. The river flows south past Bagaladi and San Lorenzo before emptying into the Ionian Sea at Melito di Porto Salvo.
