= Crostolo =

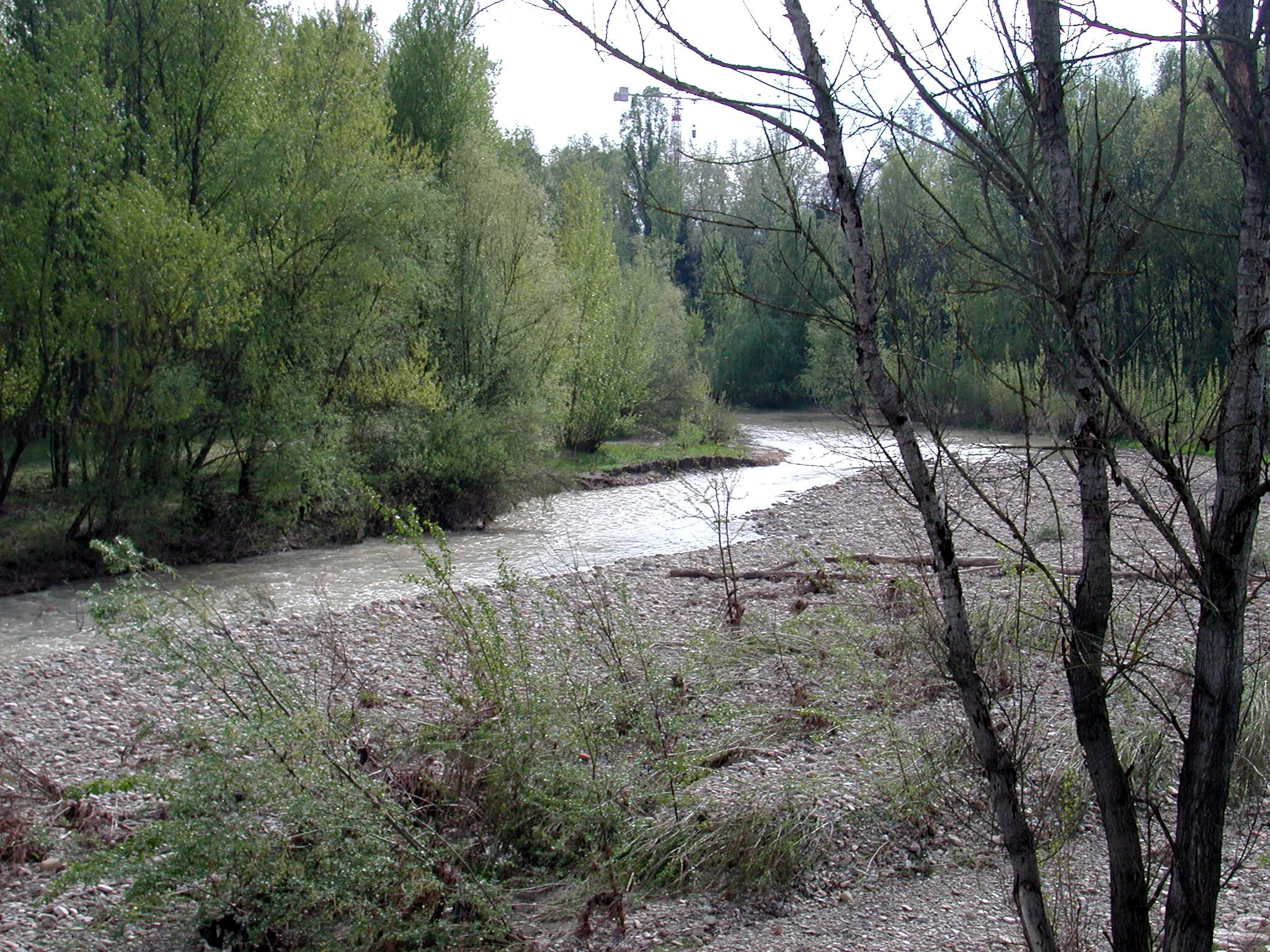
- The Crostolo at Rivalta, a frazione of Reggio Emilia

Location
- Country: Italy

Physical characteristics
- Mouth: Po
  - coordinates: 44.9299°N 10.6342°E

Basin features
- Progression: Po→ Adriatic Sea

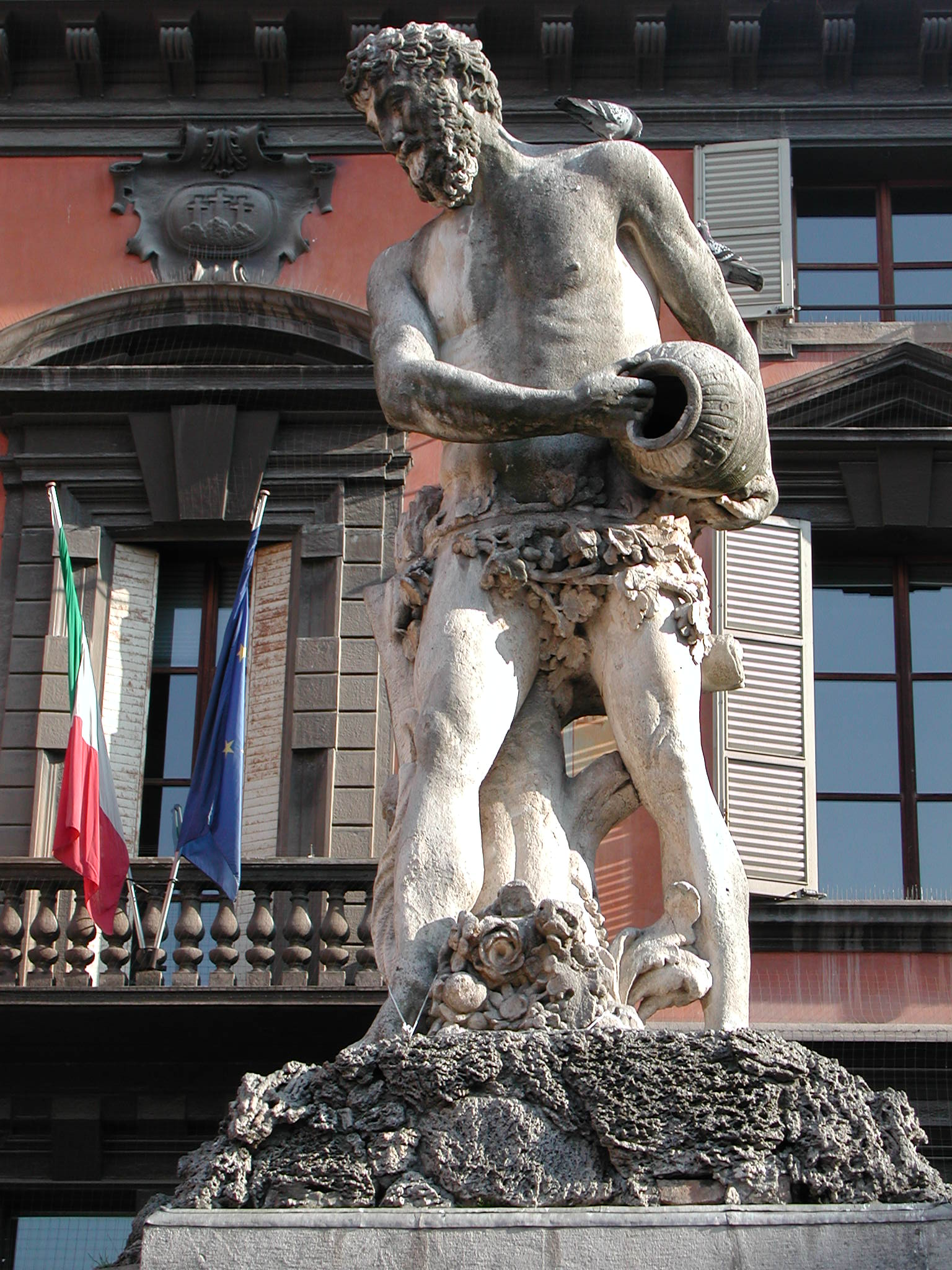
A statue in Reggio Emilia's Piazza del Duomo figuring the Crostolo

The Crostolo is a stream (a "torrente") in the Province of Reggio Emilia, Emilia-Romagna Region, Italy. It starts in the Apennines of the province of Reggio Emilia and flows northwards, passing through the provincial capital, Reggio nell'Emilia until it empties into the river Po near Guastalla.
