= Dezzo =

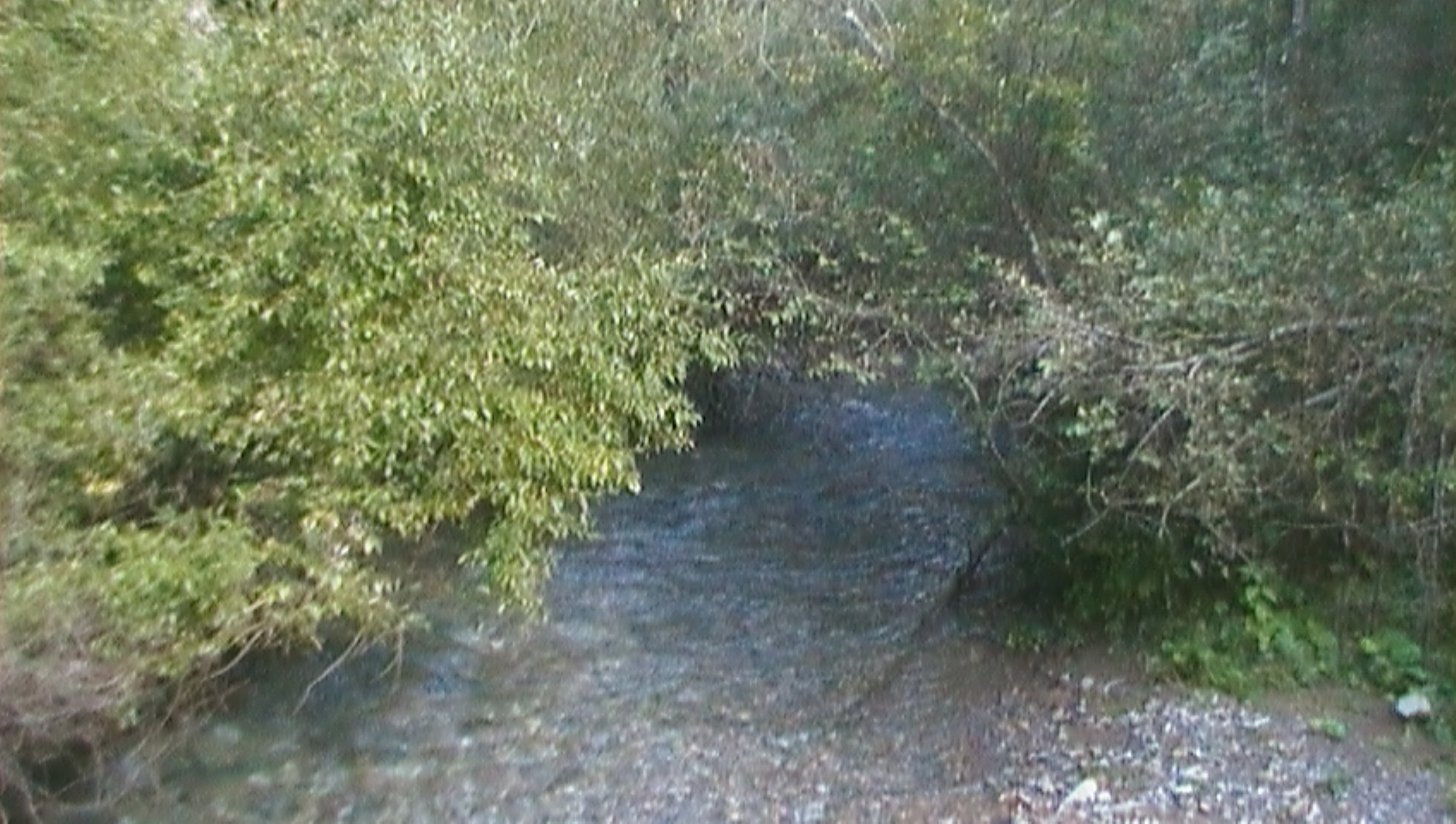
- Dezzo near the village of Schilpario

Location
- Country: Italy

Physical characteristics
- Source
  - location: Mountains of Schilpario
- Mouth
  - location: Oglio
  - coordinates: 45.8786°N 10.1774°E
- Length: 36 km (22 mi)

Basin features
- Progression: Oglio→ Po→ Adriatic Sea

The Dezzo is a river of Lombardy and is the main river of Val di Scalve. Dezzo starts its course in the mountains of Schilpario at 1,800 metres (5,900 ft) above sea level then continues to the river Oglio. Dezzo's mouth is close to the village of Boario Terme.
