= Pioverna =

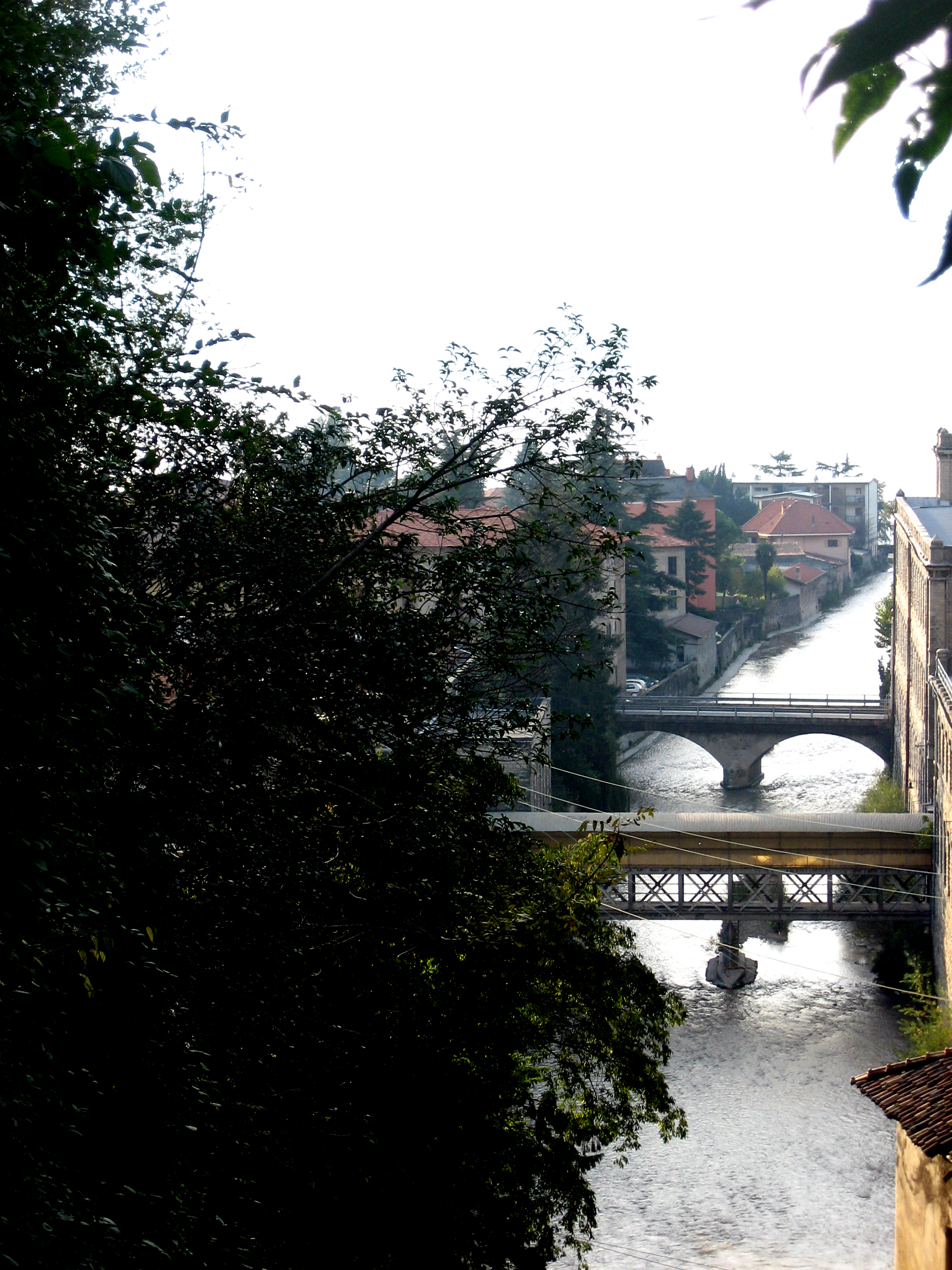
- The Pioverna at Bellano

Location
- Country: Italy

Physical characteristics
- Mouth: Lake Como
  - coordinates: 46°02′31″N 9°17′53″E

Basin features
- Progression: Lake Como→ Adda→ Po→ Adriatic Sea

The Pioverna is a torrente (a stream whose flow is subject to a high level of seasonal variation) of Lombardy in northern Italy. The stream is born in the Grigna massif and flows north and west through the Valsassina, forming a gorge at Bellano before entering Lake Como. The entire course of the stream falls within the Province of Lecco.

The river is a seasonal habitat of several species of fish. The torrent, home to brown trout, rainbow trout and European bullhead, is a favourite of anglers.

An "extreme" flood occurred on 12 June 2019.
