= Stronetta (river) =

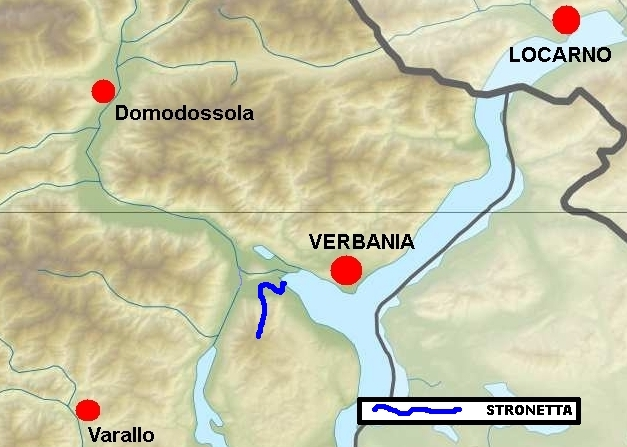
- Location within NE Piedmont (Italy)

Location
- Country: Italy

Physical characteristics
- Source
  - location: Mottarone
- Mouth
  - location: Lake Maggiore at Fondotoce
  - coordinates: 45.9333°N 8.4847°E

Basin features
- Progression: Lake Maggiore→ Ticino→ Po→ Adriatic Sea

The Stronetta, or Rio Stronetta (Italian pronunciation: [ˈriːo stroˈnɛtta]), is a small mountain torrent in the Province of Verbano Cusio Ossola, northern Italy.

It rises in the mountains to the south-east of Gravellona Toce and flows through the industrial district of the town, and into Lago Maggiore at Fondotoce, a locality of Verbania. A peculiarity of the river is that in places it is entirely covered by vegetation, and can be difficult to make out.
