= Ridnauner Bach =

Stream in South Tyrol, Italy

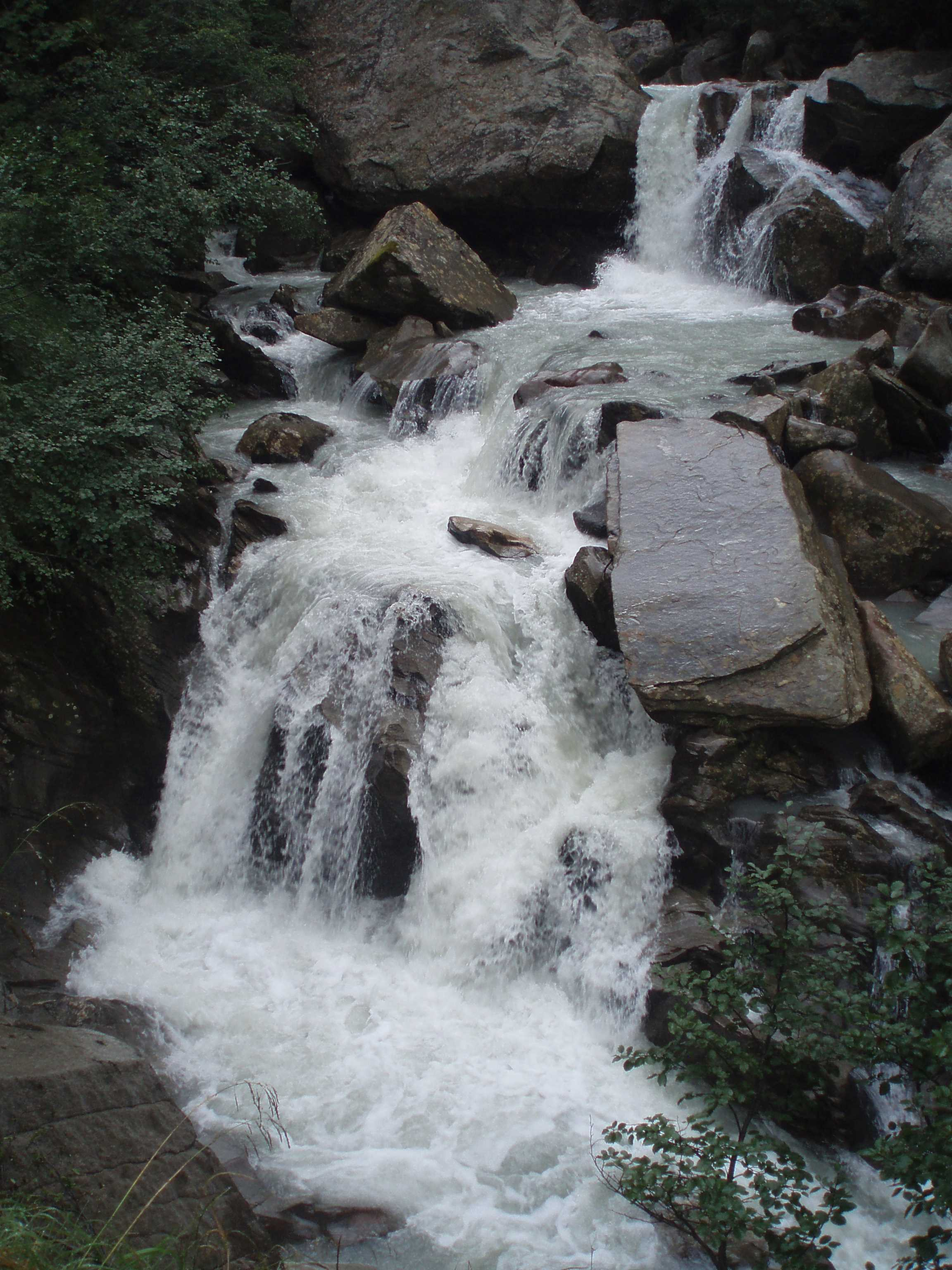

Location
- Country: Italy

Physical characteristics
- Source
  - location: Ridnauntal (South Tyrol)
- Mouth: Eisack
  - location: Sterzing
  - coordinates: 46°52′47″N 11°27′08″E
- Length: 16 km (9.9 mi)
- Basin size: 212 km^{2} (82 sq mi)

Basin features
- Progression: Eisack→ Adige→ Adriatic Sea

The Ridnauner Bach or Mareiter Bach (in Italian Rio Ridanna) is a stream in South Tyrol, Italy. It originates from the confluence of two streams just upstream of Masseria/Maiern (municipality of Racines/Ratschings), flows through the entire Ridnauntal, and empties into the Eisack in Sterzing.
