= Eggentaler Bach =

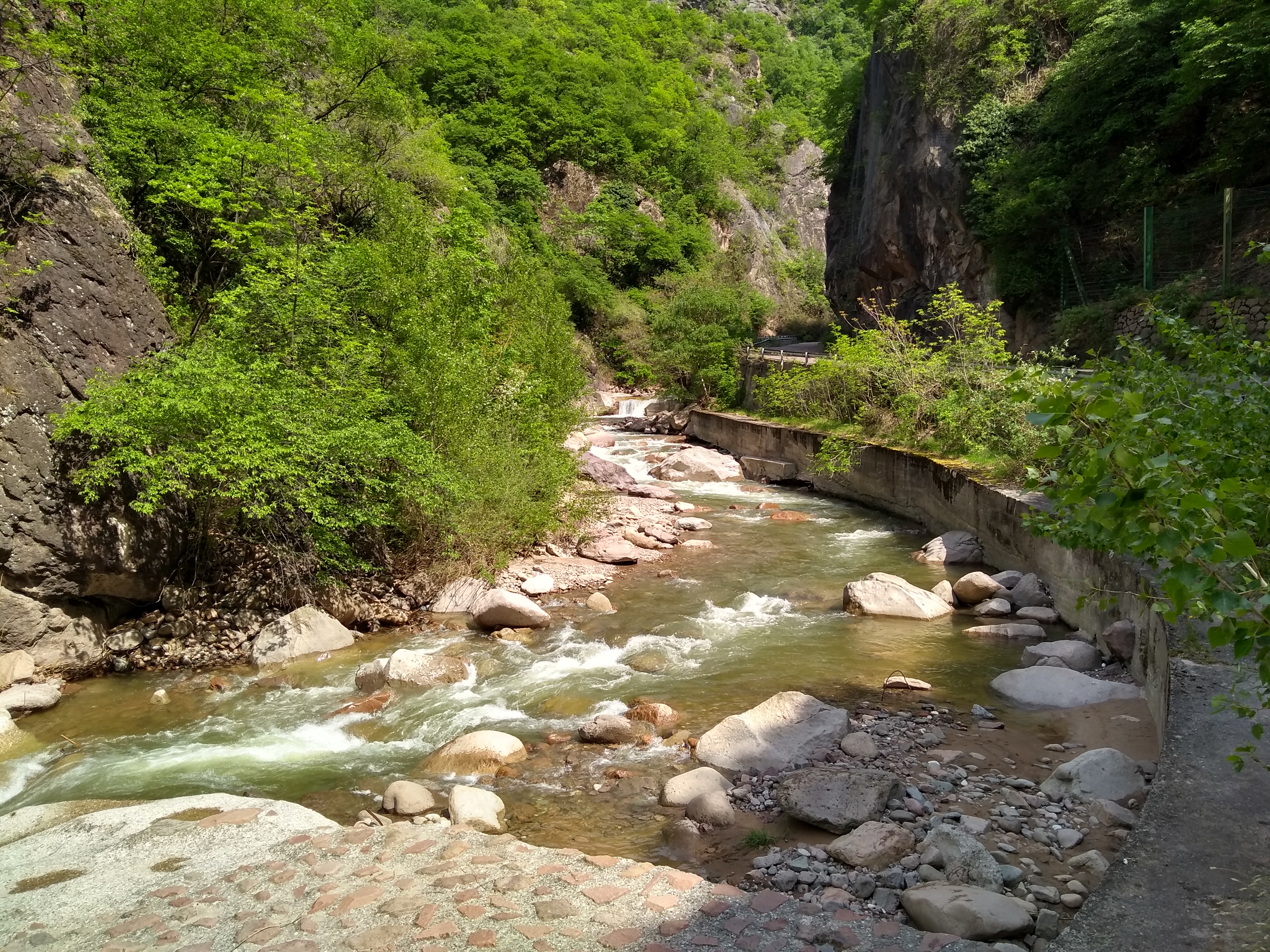

Location
- Country: Italy

Physical characteristics
- Source
  - location: Eggental (South Tyrol)
- Mouth: Eisack
  - coordinates: 46°29′41″N 11°23′20″E
- Length: 21.2 km (13.2 mi)
- Basin size: 165 km^{2} (64 sq mi)

Basin features
- Progression: Eisack→ Adige→ Adriatic Sea

The Eggentaler Bach is a stream in South Tyrol, Italy. It flows into the Eisack in Kardaun.
