= Gerace (river) =

Location
- Country: Italy

Physical characteristics
- Mouth: Ionian Sea
  - coordinates: 38.2211°N 16.2548°E

The Gerace is an Italian river whose source is near the source of the Petrace river in the Aspromonte National Park. From there, the river flows southeast past Gerace and into the Ionian Sea near Locri.
