= Amusa (river) =

Location
- Country: Italy

Physical characteristics
- Mouth: Ionian Sea
  - coordinates: 38.3376°N 16.4612°E

The Amusa is a river in Southern Italy whose source is near the border between the province of Reggio Calabria and the province of Vibo Valentia. From there, the river flows southeast past Caulonia and into the Ionian Sea east of Roccella Ionica.
