= Valchiavenna =

Valley in Lombardy, Italy

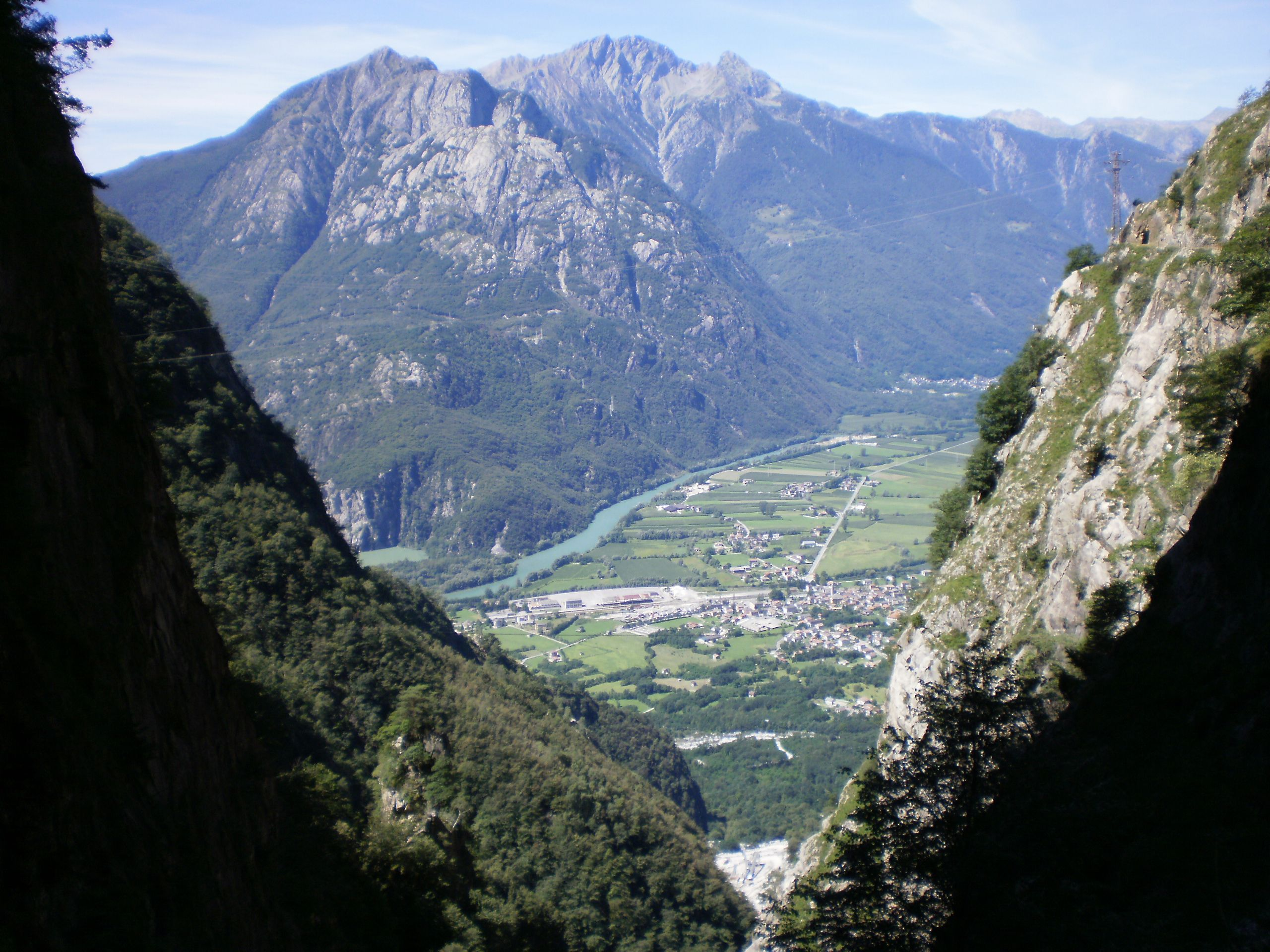

Naming
- Native name: Valciavèna (Lombard)

Geography
- Location: Province of Sondrio, Lombardy
- Country: Italy
- Coordinates: 46.25°N 9.40°E
- River: Mera; Liro
- Interactive map of Valchiavenna

Map with the grey area of Valchiavenna, Tre Pievi, Valtellina and Bormio ruled by the Three Leagues from 1512-1797

The Valchiavenna (Italian: [valkjaˈvɛnna]; Lombard: Valciàvena [ʋaltʃaˈʋɛna]) is an alpine valley in the province of Sondrio, in Lombardy in northern Italy. It lies to the north of Lake Como, and is traversed by the rivers Mera and Liro. It can be divided into three parts which branch from the confluence of these rivers near Chiavenna, the principal town of the region.

The lower part, the Bassa Valchiavenna, follows the course of the Mera downstream through the Piano di Chiavenna to Lago di Mezzola, and continues across the Pian di Spagna to the Trivio di Fuentes near Colico. Its territitory lies within the comuni of Mese, Prata Camportaccio, Gordona, Samolaco, Novate Mezzola and Verceia.

The northern part consists of the Valle Spluga, the valley of the Liro river which leads up to the Splügen Pass on the border with Switzerland and includes the comuni of San Giacomo Filippo, Madesimo, and Campodolcino.

The third subdivision of Valchiavenna is the Italian part (comuni of Villa di Chiavenna and Piuro) of the Val Bregaglia, which is the upper valley of the Mera and rises eastward towards the Passo del Maloja.

The Comunità Montana della Valchiavenna, which coincides approximately with the Valchiavenna, includes the thirteen comuni of Campodolcino, Chiavenna, Gordona, Madesimo, Menarola, Mese, Novate Mezzola, Piuro, Prata Camportaccio, Samolaco, San Giacomo Filippo, Verceia and Villa di Chiavenna. The Riserva Naturale Pian di Spagna e Lago di Mezzola lies partly within it.

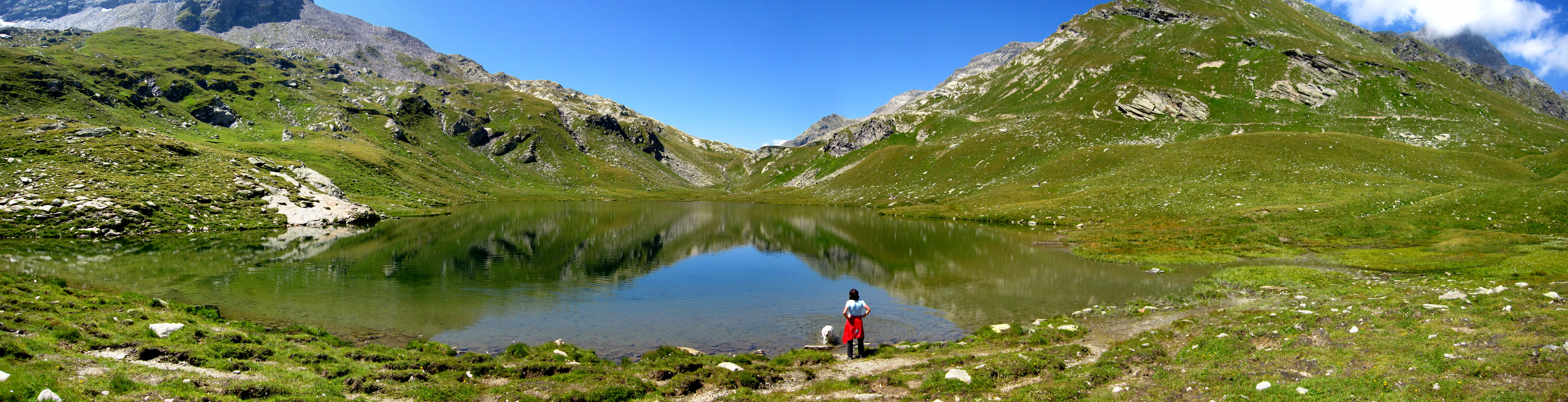
The Lago Grande di Baldiscio
