= Valle Spluga =

Alpine valley in Sondrio, Italy

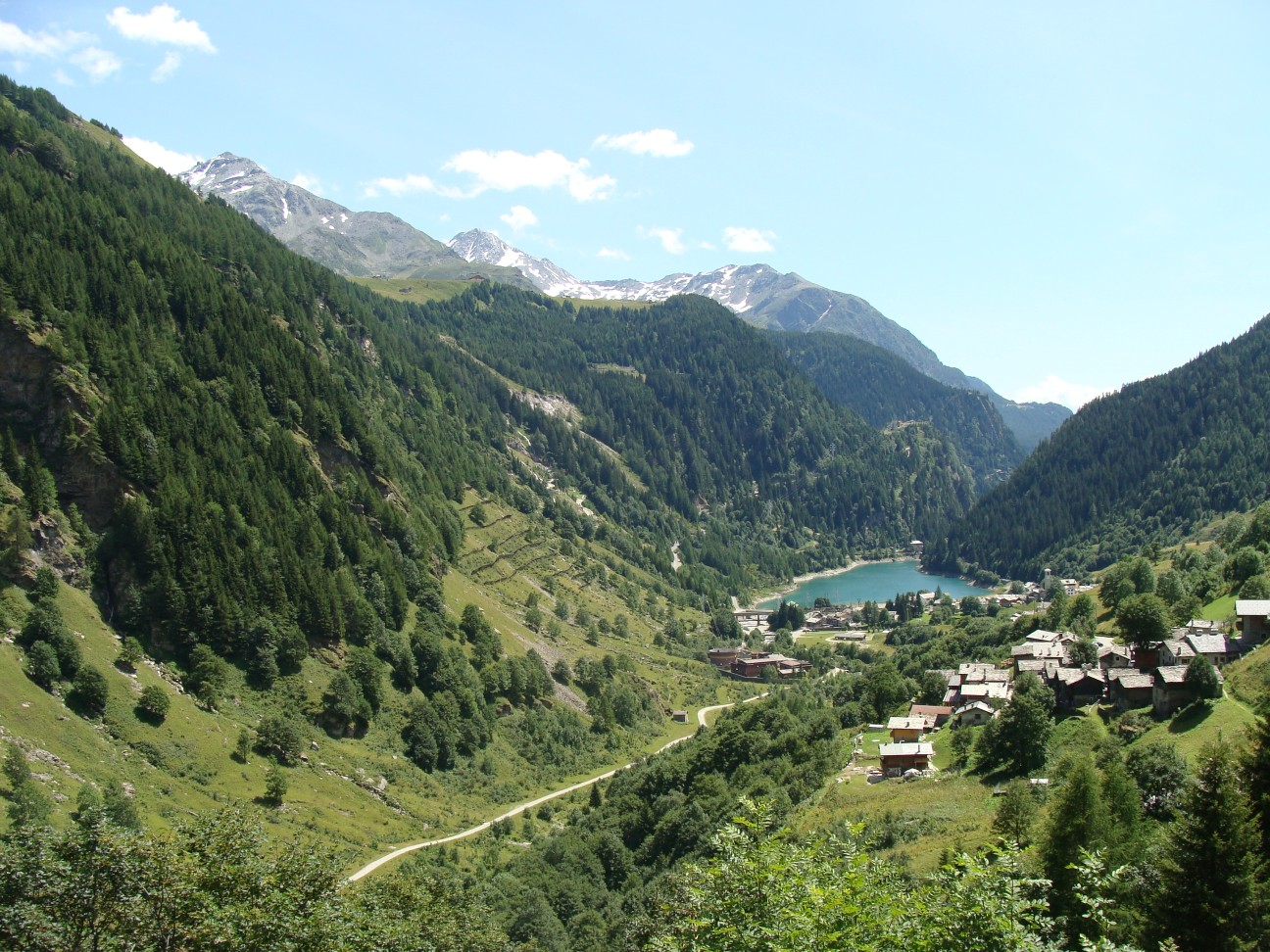
Panorama of Val San Giacomo with Lake Isola

Flag of Valle Spluga

The Valle Spluga, also known as Val San Giacomo, is an Alpine valley in the province of Sondrio in Lombardy, northern Italy. The valley extends from the Splügen Pass on the border with Switzerland southwards to Chiavenna and comprises the municipalities of San Filippo, Campodolcino, and Isolato (now part of Madesimo). The valley has historically functioned as a transit corridor on routes linking northern and southern Alpine regions.
