= Mesocco =

- Municipality
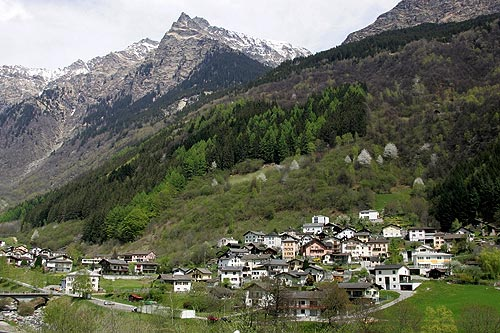

- Flag Coat of arms
- Location of Mesocco
- Location within Switzerland Location within Canton of Grisons
- Coordinates: 46°23′N 9°13′E
- Country: Switzerland
- Canton: Grisons
- District: Moesa

Area
  - Total: 164.9 km^{2} (63.7 sq mi)
- Elevation: 769 m (2,523 ft)

Population (December 2020)
  - Total: 1,323
  - Density: 8.023/km^{2} (20.78/sq mi)
- Time zone: UTC+01:00 (CET)
  - Summer (DST): UTC+02:00 (CEST)
- Postal code: 6563
- SFOS number: 3822
- ISO 3166 code: CH-GR
- Localities: San Bernardino
- Surrounded by: Campodolcino (IT-SO), Hinterrhein, Madesimo (IT-SO), Malvaglia (TI), Nufenen, Rossa, San Giacomo Filippo (IT-SO), Soazza, Splügen
- Website: www.mesocco.ch

Mesocco (Lombard: Mesòch) is a municipality in the Moesa Region in the Swiss canton of the Grisons.

== History ==
The first human settlement in the area dates back to the Mesolithic era. Stone tools dating to about 6000 BC have been found in the Silex section of the municipality. At the same site, Neolithic fire pits and ceramics (5000 BC) were also discovered. The first permanent settlements in the area date to the Bronze Age (about 1400-1200 BC) and the pre-Roman Iron Age. A notable necropolis from the early Iron Age (600-500 BC) and traces of a Roman settlement were discovered on Gorda hill near the village. Additionally, an Early Middle Ages grave (6th century AD) was also discovered on the same hill.

The castle was built in the 12th century and is first mentioned in 1219. The village of Mesocco is first mentioned in 1203 as Mesoco. In 1383 it was mentioned as Misogg. In 1480 Mesocco and Soazza willingly joined the Gray League.

Between 1907 and 1978, Mesocco was linked to Bellinzona and the Gotthard railway by the Bellinzona–Mesocco railway.

== Geography ==
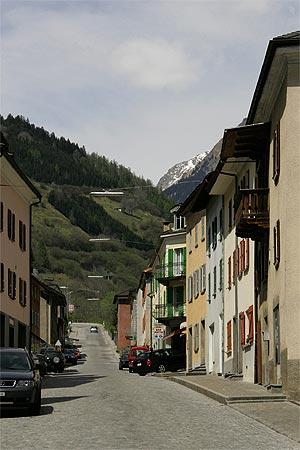
Village street in Mesocco

Aerial view (1953)

Mesocco has an area, as of 2006, of 164.8 km^{2} (63.6 sq mi). Of this area, 20.1% is used for agricultural purposes, while 20.1% is forested. Of the rest of the land, 1.3% is settled (buildings or roads) and the remainder (58.6%) is non-productive (rivers, glaciers or mountains).

Before 2017, the municipality was located in the Moesa sub-district of the Mesocco district, after 2017 it was part of the Moesa Region. It is the northernmost municipality in the Misox valley and is one of the largest in the canton. It contains the secondary school for the area, the local district courts and numerous government offices. It consists of the village of Mesocco with eleven sections, including the mountain village of San Bernardino.

== Demographics ==
Mesocco has a population (as of 31 December 2020) of 1,323. As of 2008, 13.5% of the population was made up of foreign nationals. Over the last 10 years the population has decreased at a rate of -1.1%. Most of the population (as of 2000) speaks Italian (89.1%), with German being second most common (6.2%) and Albanian being third (1.4%).

As of 2000, the gender distribution of the population was 50.4% male and 49.6% female. The age distribution, as of 2000, in Mesocco is; 112 children or 9.3% of the population are between 0 and 9 years old. 62 teenagers or 5.2% are 10 to 14, and 41 teenagers or 3.4% are 15 to 19. Of the adult population, 134 people or 11.2% of the population are between 20 and 29 years old. 189 people or 15.7% are 30 to 39, 163 people or 13.6% are 40 to 49, and 150 people or 12.5% are 50 to 59. The senior population distribution is 157 people or 13.1% of the population are between 60 and 69 years old, 129 people or 10.7% are 70 to 79, there are 50 people or 4.2% who are 80 to 89, and there are 14 people or 1.2% who are 90 to 99.

In the 2007 federal election the most popular party was the SP which received 37.1% of the vote. The next three most popular parties were the SVP (34.1%), the CVP (20.5%) and the FDP (8.2%).

In Mesocco about 70.3% of the population (between age 25-64) have completed either non-mandatory upper secondary education or additional higher education (either university or a Fachhochschule).

Mesocco has an unemployment rate of 4.26%. As of 2005, there were 52 people employed in the primary economic sector and about 17 businesses involved in this sector. 138 people are employed in the secondary sector and there are 19 businesses in this sector. 263 people are employed in the tertiary sector, with 56 businesses in this sector.

From the 2000 census, 1,093 or 91.0% are Roman Catholic, while 37 or 3.1% belonged to the Swiss Reformed Church. Of the rest of the population, there are 5 individuals (or about 0.42% of the population) who belong to the Orthodox Church. There are 23 (or about 1.92% of the population) who are Islamic. 31 (or about 2.58% of the population) belong to no church, are agnostic or atheist, and 12 individuals (or about 1.00% of the population) did not answer the question.

The historical population is given in the following table:

| year | population |
|---|---|
| 1701 | 1,013 |
| 1773 | 921 |
| 1802 | 862 |
| 1850 | 1,182 |
| 1900 | 1,173 |
| 1950 | 1,150 |
| 2000 | 1,201 |

== Climate ==
Between 1991 and 2020 Mesocco had an average of 123.9 days of rain per year and on average received 1,637 mm (64.4 in) of precipitation. The wettest month was August during which time Mesocco received an average of 187 mm (7.4 in) of precipitation. During this month there was precipitation for an average of 12.7 days. The driest month of the year was February with an average of 60 mm (2.4 in) of precipitation over 6.5 days.

Climate data for S. Bernardino (1991–2020)
| Month | Jan | Feb | Mar | Apr | May | Jun | Jul | Aug | Sep | Oct | Nov | Dec | Year |
|---|---|---|---|---|---|---|---|---|---|---|---|---|---|
| Mean daily maximum °C (°F) | 0.7 (33.3) | 1.0 (33.8) | 3.7 (38.7) | 6.8 (44.2) | 11.5 (52.7) | 15.9 (60.6) | 18.2 (64.8) | 17.8 (64.0) | 13.4 (56.1) | 9.2 (48.6) | 4.1 (39.4) | 1.3 (34.3) | 8.6 (47.5) |
| Daily mean °C (°F) | −3.4 (25.9) | −3.1 (26.4) | −0.3 (31.5) | 2.7 (36.9) | 7.0 (44.6) | 11.2 (52.2) | 13.2 (55.8) | 12.9 (55.2) | 9.0 (48.2) | 5.0 (41.0) | 0.4 (32.7) | −2.6 (27.3) | 4.3 (39.7) |
| Mean daily minimum °C (°F) | −7.3 (18.9) | −7.1 (19.2) | −4.2 (24.4) | −1.1 (30.0) | 2.9 (37.2) | 6.7 (44.1) | 8.6 (47.5) | 8.6 (47.5) | 5.1 (41.2) | 1.4 (34.5) | −2.7 (27.1) | −6.1 (21.0) | 0.4 (32.7) |
| Average precipitation mm (inches) | 77 (3.0) | 60 (2.4) | 81 (3.2) | 133 (5.2) | 168 (6.6) | 172 (6.8) | 159 (6.3) | 187 (7.4) | 162 (6.4) | 181 (7.1) | 168 (6.6) | 88 (3.5) | 1,637 (64.4) |
| Average snowfall cm (inches) | 100 (39) | 82 (32) | 77 (30) | 92 (36) | 14 (5.5) | 1 (0.4) | 0 (0) | 0 (0) | 1 (0.4) | 10 (3.9) | 69 (27) | 91 (36) | 537 (211) |
| Average precipitation days (≥ 1.0 mm) | 7.6 | 6.5 | 8.1 | 10.1 | 14.1 | 12.5 | 12.0 | 12.7 | 10.0 | 11.1 | 10.7 | 8.5 | 123.9 |
| Average snowy days (≥ 1.0 cm) | 8.7 | 7.7 | 7.8 | 7.8 | 1.8 | 0.1 | 0.0 | 0.0 | 0.2 | 1.6 | 7.0 | 8.9 | 51.6 |
| Average relative humidity (%) | 66 | 63 | 66 | 71 | 73 | 72 | 72 | 75 | 77 | 77 | 74 | 68 | 71 |
| Mean monthly sunshine hours | 97 | 107 | 141 | 128 | 128 | 145 | 163 | 154 | 133 | 109 | 81 | 86 | 1,470 |
| Percentage possible sunshine | 54 | 56 | 52 | 44 | 40 | 44 | 49 | 50 | 49 | 48 | 45 | 51 | 48 |
Source: MeteoSwiss (snow 1981–2010)

== Sights ==
=== Heritage sites of national significance ===
The Castello di Mesocco and the Church of S. Maria al Castello are listed as Swiss heritage sites of national significance.

The Castello ruins are among the largest in the canton. Originally the seat of the noble family von Sax, from the 12th century until 1480 it was held by the Freiherr of Misox. From 1480 until 1549 it was held by the Trivulzio family.

At the foot of the castle is the Church of Santa Maria al Castello. The church was first mentioned in 1219. It houses several frescoes from the workshop of Seregnesi from the mid-15th century.

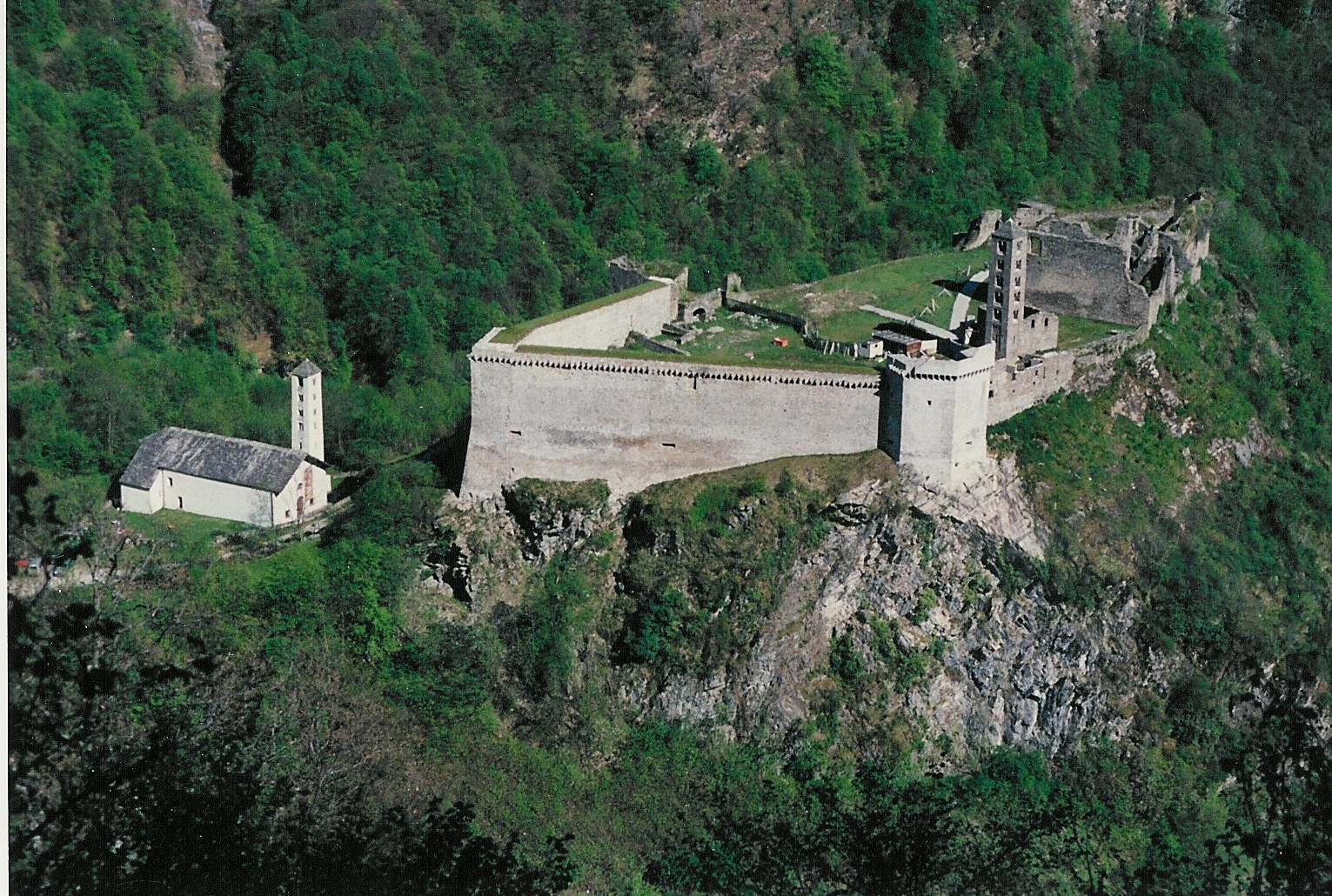
Aerial view of the castle

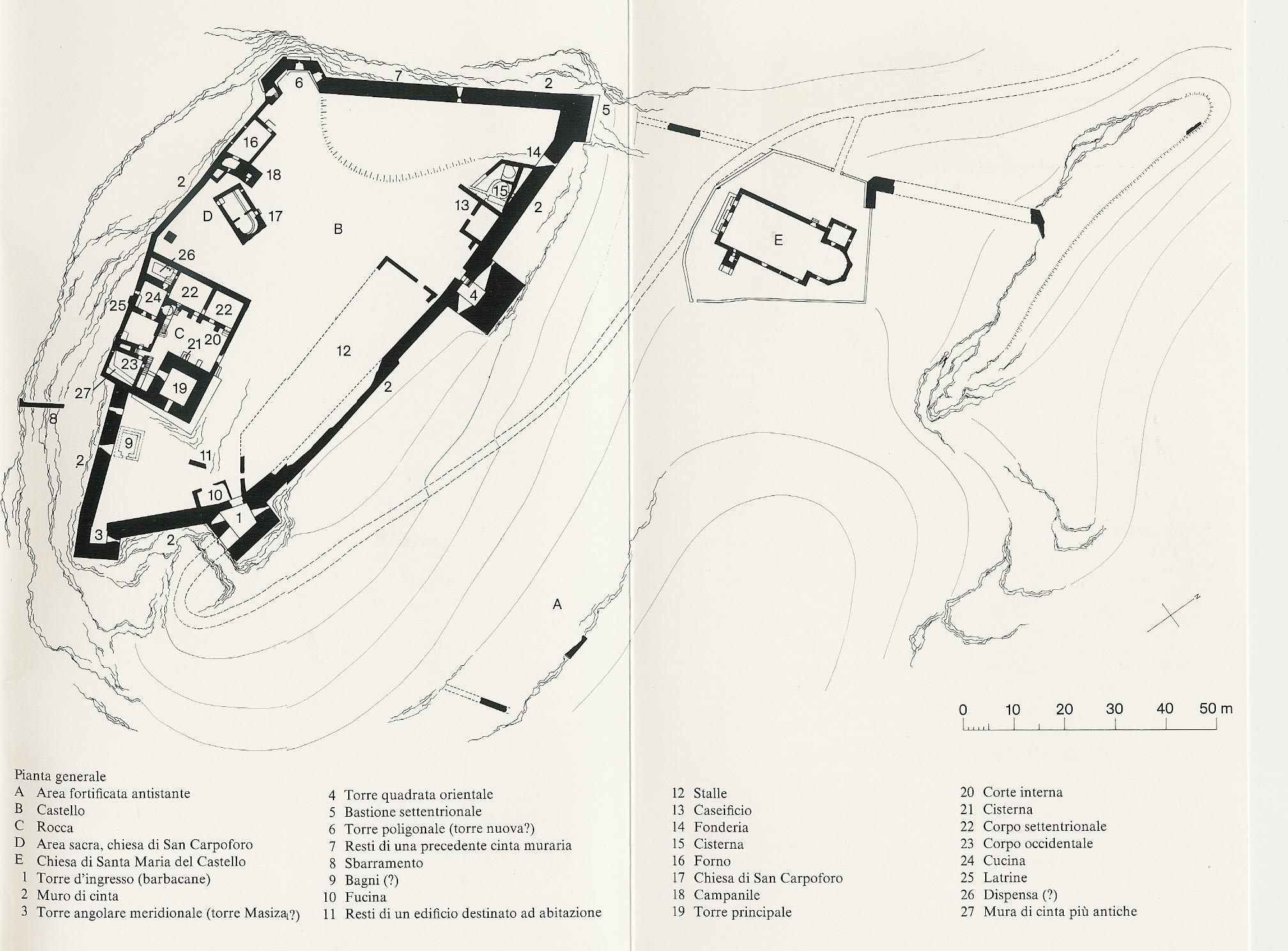
Castle plan

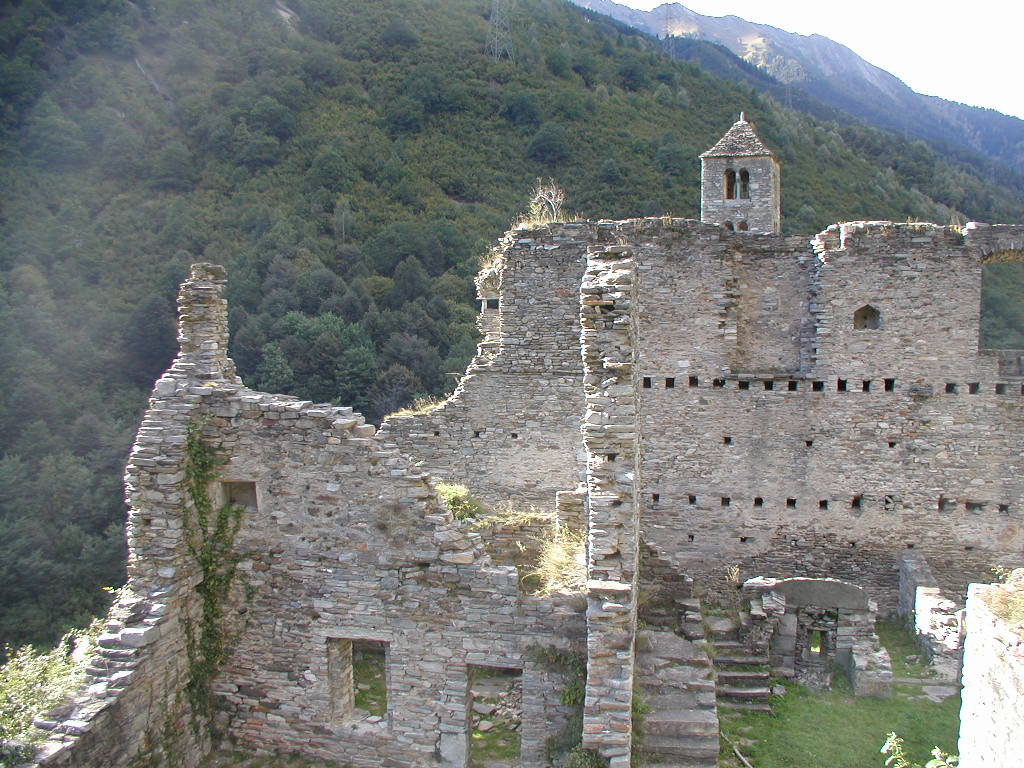
Castle walls

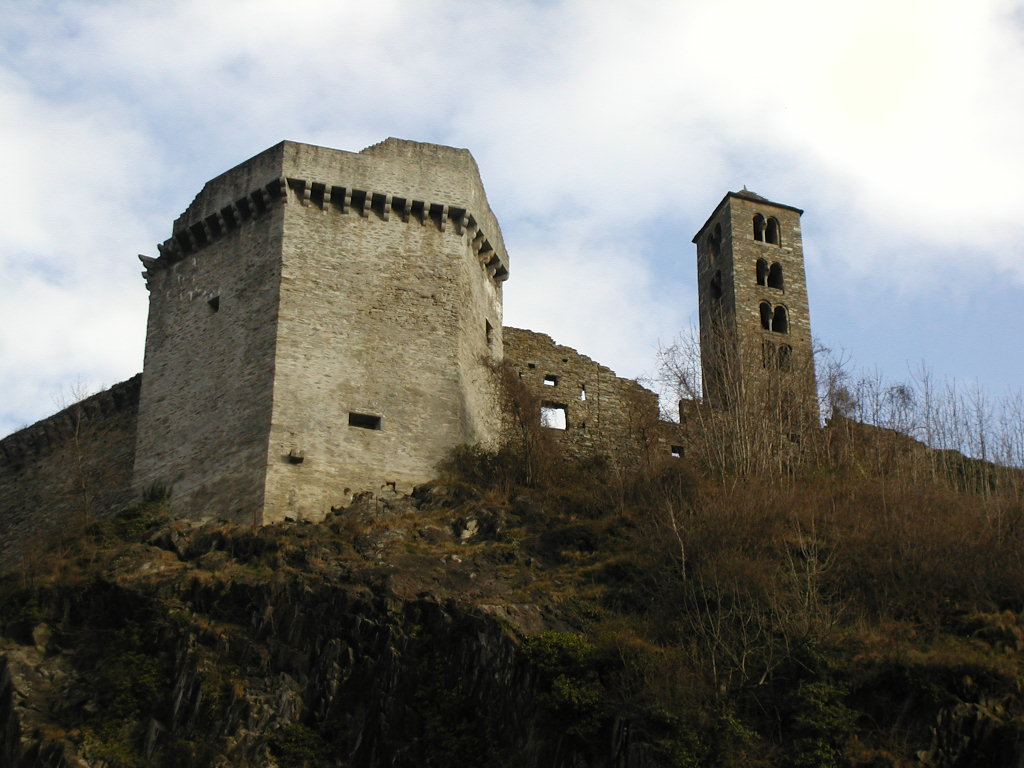
Main tower and bell tower

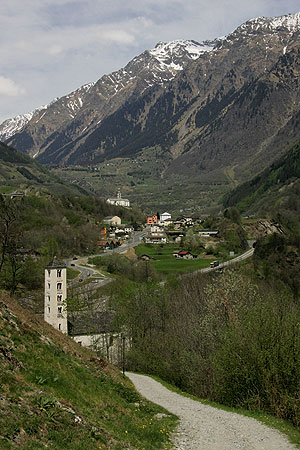
View from the castle toward Mesocco and the Church of S. Maria

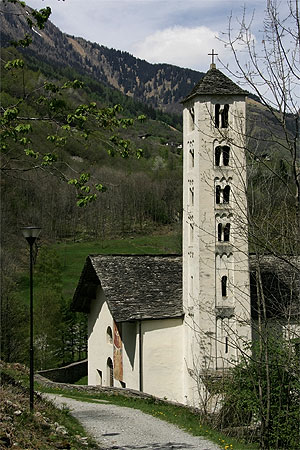
S. Maria al Castello

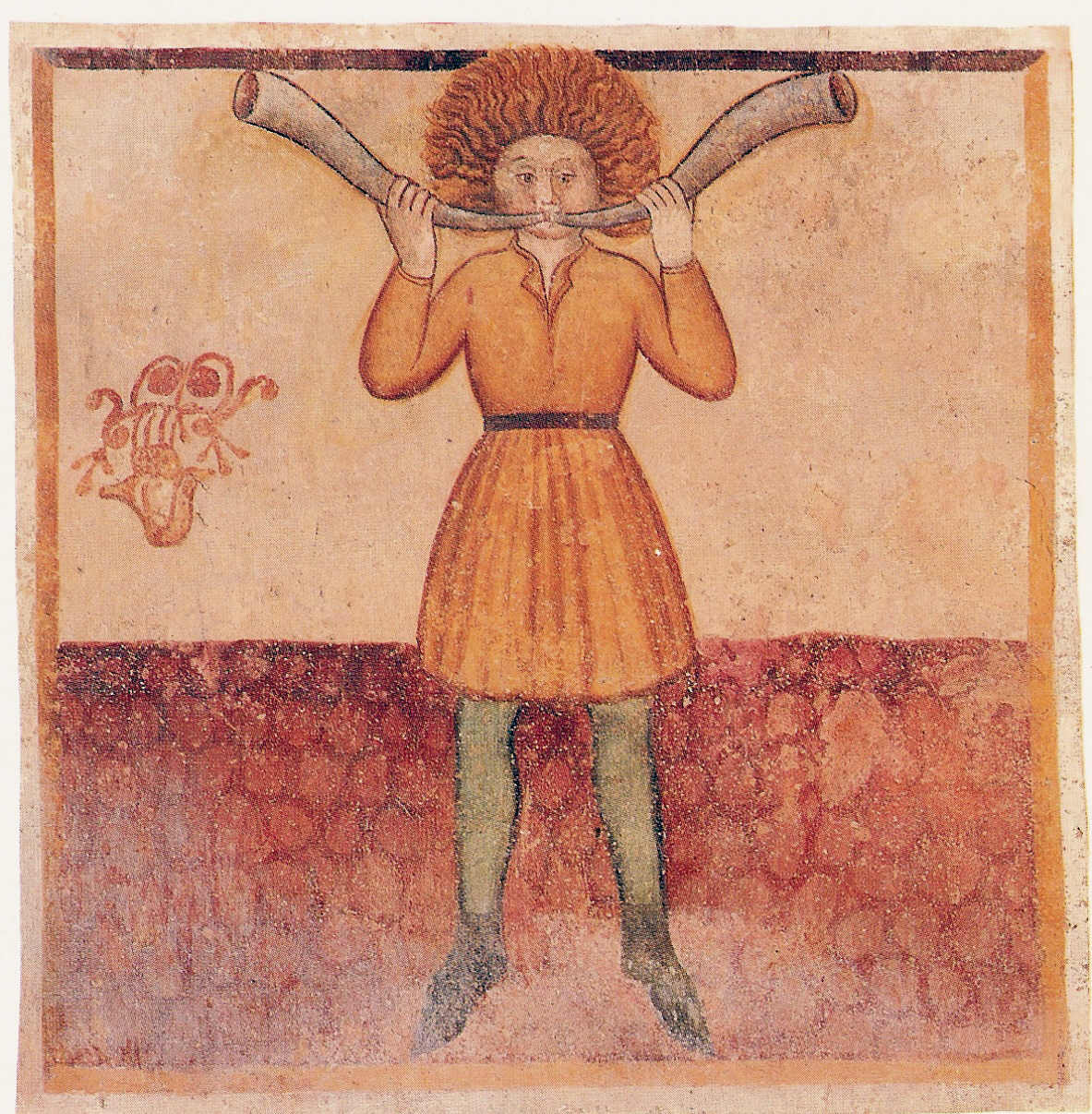
Fresco from the church, representing the month of March

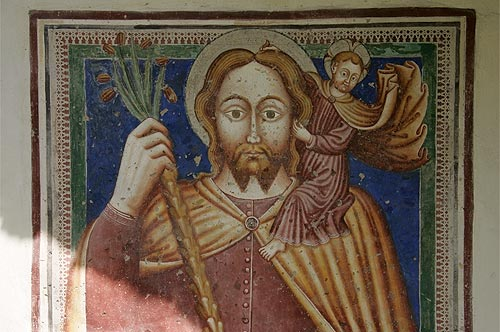
Fresco of St. Christopher

=== Churches ===
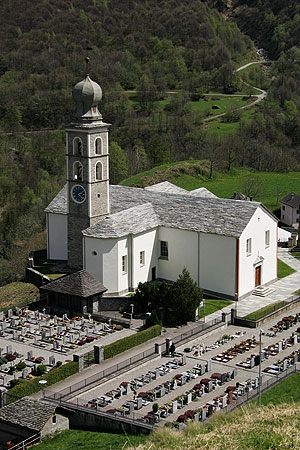
The church of SS. Pietro e Paolo

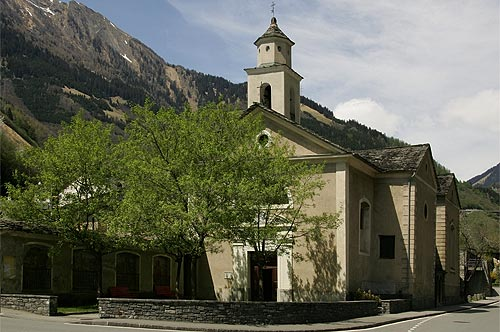
The church of S. Rocco

The parish church of SS. Pietro e Paolo was first mentioned in 1219. In the 17th century it was renovated and in 1959 it was restored.

The church of S. Rocco was built with an attached hospice, which since 1668 has been staffed by the Capuchin friars. The church grounds include a number of chapels, among then, the chapel of S. Giacomo which was first mentioned in 1419.

During the Protestant Reformation, the church of S. Giuseppe in Andergia, was used for Protestant services.

The church of S. Giovanni Nepomuceno in Cebbia, was destroyed in 1978 by a flood and had to be rebuilt.

=== Other buildings ===
The House a Marca was built in 1565 and later expanded. In addition to this old house, there are a several of patrician houses from the 19th century.
