= Chiavenna =

Chiavenna Ciavèna (Lombard) Clavenna / Claven (Romansh)
- Comune
- Città di Chiavenna
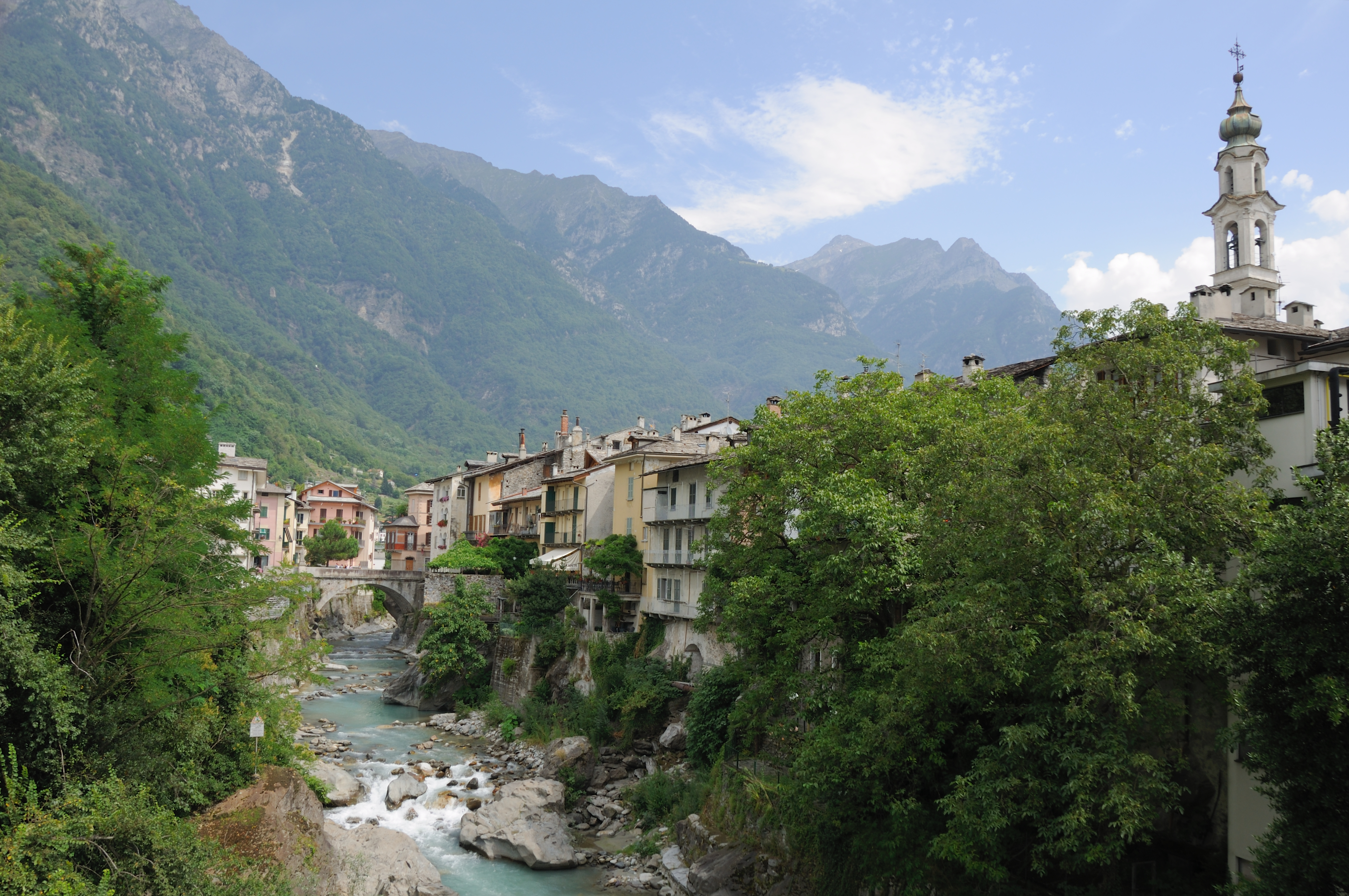
- Townscape on the Mera

- Flag

- Chiavenna within the Province of Sondrio

- Location within Italy Location within Lombardy
- Coordinates: 46°19′N 9°24′E
- Country: Italy
- Region: Lombardy
- Province: Sondrio (SO)
- Frazioni: Campedello, Loreto, Pianazzola, San Carlo

Government
  - Mayor: Luca Della Bitta

Area
  - Total: 10.77 km^{2} (4.16 sq mi)
- Elevation: 333 m (1,093 ft)

Population (31 May 2022)
  - Total: 7,149
  - Density: 663.8/km^{2} (1,719/sq mi)
- Demonym: Chiavennasque
- Time zone: UTC+1 (CET)
  - Summer (DST): UTC+2 (CEST)
- Postal code: 23022
- Dialing code: 0343
- Website: Official website

Chiavenna (Italian: [kjaˈvɛnna]; Lombard: Ciavèna [tʃaˈʋɛna]; Latin: Clavenna; Romansh: Clavenna [klaˈvɛnːɐ] or Claven; archaic German: Cläven or Kleven) is a comune (municipality) in the Province of Sondrio in the northern Italian region of Lombardy. It is the centre of the Alpine Valchiavenna region. The historic town is a member of the Cittaslow movement.

== Geography ==
Chiavenna is located about 100 kilometres (62 mi) north of Milan and about 40 kilometres (25 mi) northwest of Sondrio. The town is situated on the right bank of the river Mera about 16 kilometres (10 mi) north of Lake Como. The river course leads up to Val Bregaglia in the east and the Swiss border at Castasegna. In the north, the Valle Spluga stretches up to Passo dello Spluga and the road to Chur in the Grisons.

Chiavenna borders the following municipalities: Mese, Piuro, Prata Camportaccio, and San Giacomo Filippo.

The municipality of Chiavenna contains the frazioni (subdivisions, mainly villages and hamlets) Campedello, Loreto, Pianazzola, and San Carlo. As of 31 December 2004, it had a population of 7,263 and an area of 11.1 square kilometres (4.3 mi^{2}).

== History ==
=== Antiquity ===
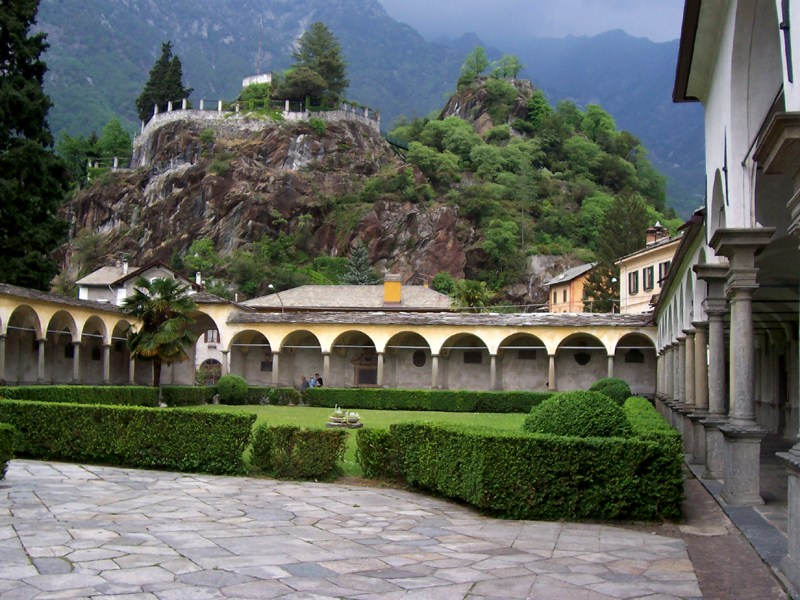
Porticato della Collegiata di S. Lorenzo.

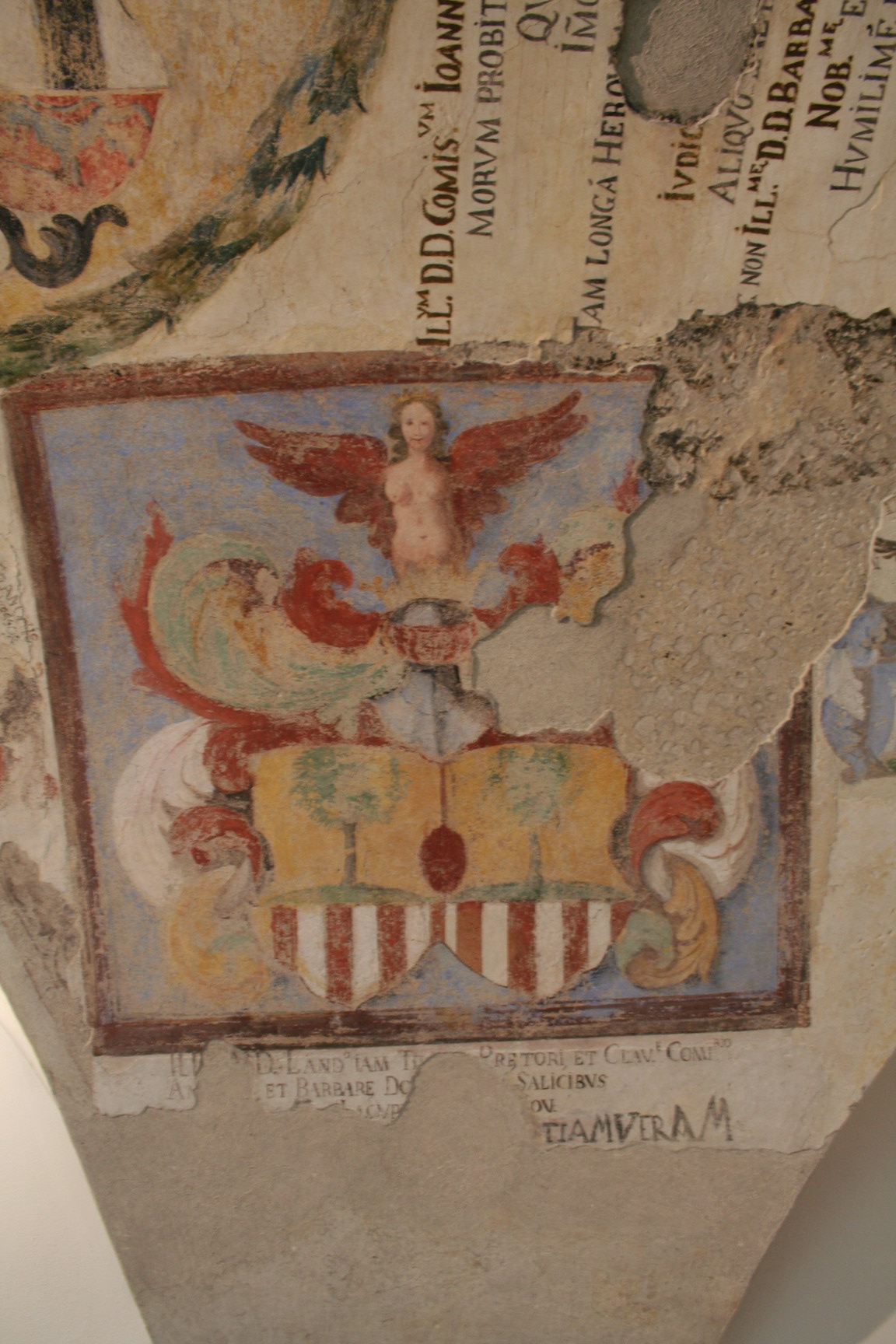
Salis impailing Salis, 16th- or 17th-century heraldry.

The name of Chiavenna, believed to derive by paretymology from clavis (English: key) referring to its pivotal position on the mountain passes between Northern Italy and the Posterior Rhine valley, comes in reality from a much older, pre-Latin (probably Ligurian and certainly non-Celtic) etymon klava, meaning fallen rocks of a mountain slip. In Roman times Clavenna, conquered in 16 BC by the troops of Emperor Augustus during his Alpine campaigns, temporarily was a town of the Raetia et Vindelicia province, though actually located on the Italian (Cisalpine Gaul) side of the Alpine crest, north of the head of the Lacus Larius (modern Lake Como) at the entrance of the Valle Spluga.

The Romans had two important roads built from Clavenna: the itineraries demonstrate that the route up the Valle Spluga to Splügen Pass was frequented in ancient times; as well as another, which separated from it at Clavenna, and led by a more circuitous route up the Val Bregaglia (Val Chiavenna) and across Septimer Pass to Curia (modern Chur), where it rejoined the preceding road. (Itin. Ant. pp. 277, 278; Tab. Peut.; P. Diac. vi. 29.) These passes had already played an important role as a line of supply for the Roman legion. It was by one or other of the roads that Magister militium Stilicho crossed the Alps in midwinter, a feat celebrated by Claudian (de B. Get. 320–358).

=== Middle Ages ===
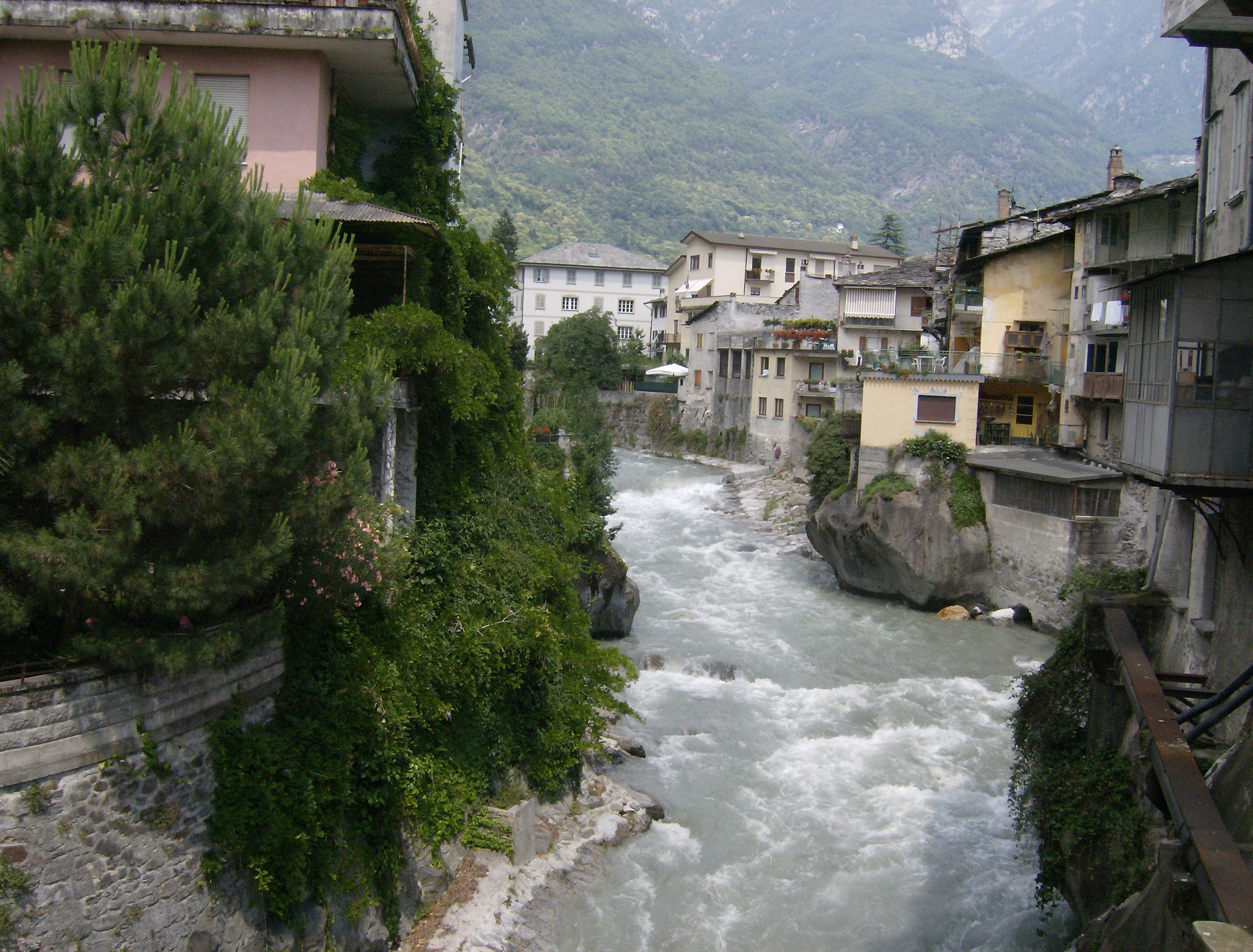
The Mera.

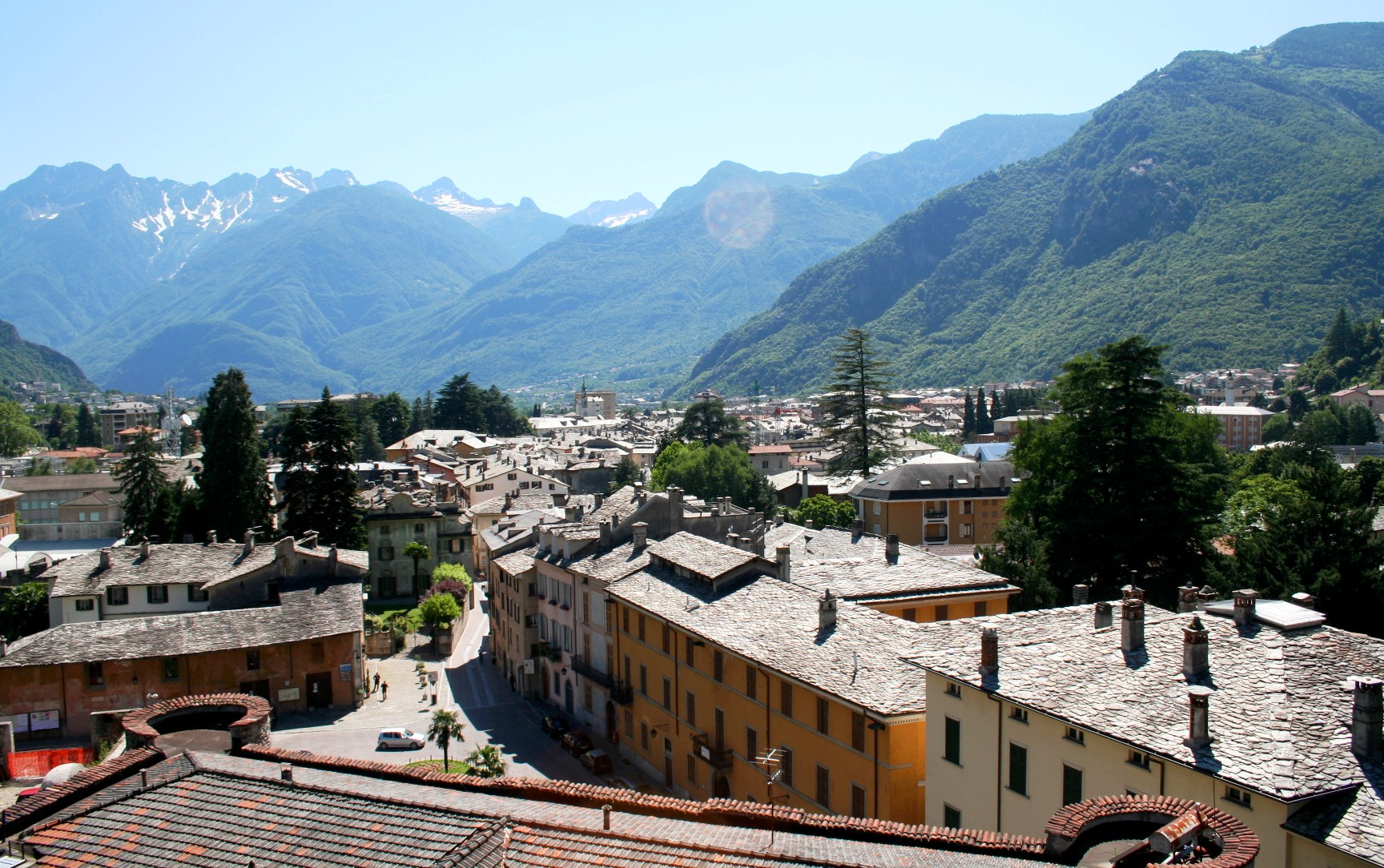
Chiavenna from the north, June 2009.

After the collapse of the Western Roman Empire the city marked the northern limit of the Ostrogothic Kingdom in Italy. Clavenna belonged to the Italian territories retaken by the Byzantine Empire in the mid-6th century during the reign of Emperor Justinian the Great and avoided capture by the Lombard kingdom until the 7th century. Clavenna probably derived some importance from its position at the junction of the two pass roads, as does the modern town of Chiavenna, which is the chief town of the surrounding district.

When the East Frankish king Otto I married the dowager queen Adelaide of Italy in October 951 and campaigned against King Berengar II, he assigned the Val Bregaglia and the control over Septimer Pass to the Bishopric of Chur, while the Bishops of Como held the adjacent estates from Villa down to Chiavenna in the southwest (corresponding to the current Italian-Swiss border). In 961 King Otto himself took the Septimer road to traverse the Alps on his way to Rome to be crowned Holy Roman Emperor the following year. The citizens of Chiavenna received town privileges from the Como bishops in 1030.

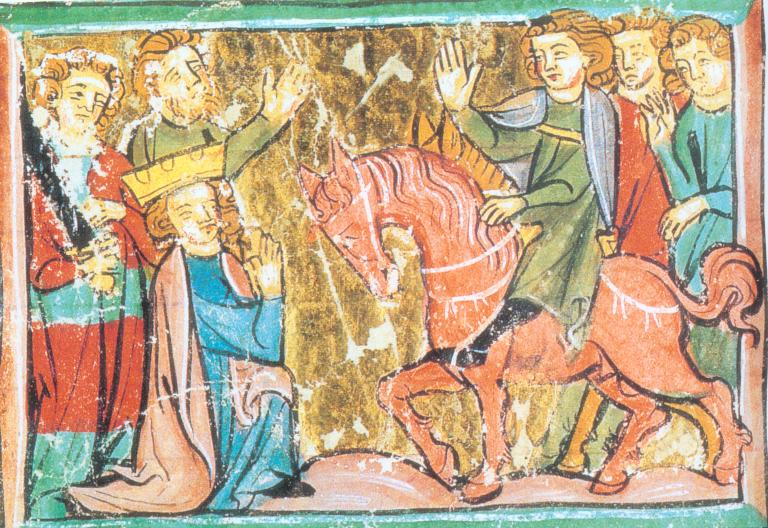
Barbarossa kneeling in front of Henry the Lion, Sächsische Weltchronik (13th century)

Chiavenna is crowned by a ruined castle, once an important strategic point, and the seat of the counts who ruled the valley from the time of the Goths till 1194, when the district was handed over to the Bishops of Chur. In medieval times, the castello served as a residence of local counts controlling the Alpine passes in the north and east. The Hohenstaufen emperor Frederick Barbarossa first crossed Septimer Pass on his Italian campaign of 1163/64. It was in Chiavenna, where in 1176 he met with his Welf cousin, the Saxon duke Henry the Lion. He allegedly fell on his knees to implore Henry's aid against the cities of the Lombard League, however, the duke refused. Two years later, the forces of the Chur bishops advanced across the Alpine crest into the Val Bregaglia and by 1194, Chiavenna was incorporated into the Upper Raetian territories of the Duchy of Swabia.

With the adjacent Valtellina (Veltlin) valley in the southeast, the town was acquired by the Visconti lords of Milan in 1335 from the Chur bishops.

=== Modern age ===
During the time of the transalpine campaigns of the Old Swiss Confederacy from the early 15th century onwards, Chiavenna was controlled by the Three Leagues' forces, fighting against the Sforza who had succeeded the Visconti as Dukes of Milan. In 1486 they set Chiavenna ablaze; two years later, Ludovico Sforza had the town fortified. Nevertheless, Chiavenna was conquered by the Leagues's forces during the War of the League of Cambrai, when they allied with the Swiss Confederacy defeating the French troops of King Louis XII at the 1513 Battle of Novara. Together with the Valtellina and Bormio (Worms), the Chiavenna estates became bailiwicks governed by the Three Leagues. A first Protestant parish arose in 1542; thereafter, Chiavenna became a centre of the Reformation while numerous religious refugees from the Italian lands settled here, among them notable theologians like Camillo Renato, Bernardino Ochino, and Girolamo Zanchi.

Temporarily lost during the Bündner Wirren in 1620–39 during the Thirty Years' War, the Three Leagues' rule over Chiavenna actually lasted until 1797, when the French revolutionaries merged it into the Cisalpine Republic which was rapidly promoted to the Regno d'Italia with Eugène de Beauharnais as Viceré (the King being Napoleon Bonaparte himself). Hence, together with neighbouring Bormio and Valtellina valleys, it did not form part of the Swiss Confederacy, as the Free State of the Three Leagues (modern Canton of Grisons, German: Graubünden) was not part of Switzerland until Napoleon's much later conquest. To this day, there is a statue of the Anglo-Swiss count Peter de Salis (1738–1807) in Chiavenna, from the time when he was governor of the Valtellina.

After the fall of Napoleon, from 1815 to 1859 Chiavenna and the whole of Lombardy and Veneto went to the House of Habsburg, who always wanted control of the pass from Austria to Milan to link the Habsburg families. During the favourable time of the Kingdom of Lombardy–Venetia, primary schools were created in every place, and the instruction was made obligatory for maids. Lombard and Venetic women where the first to be alphabetised in Italy, long before the women of other Italian provinces. The Austrian administration build bold modern routes (Spluga, Stelvio), created hospitals and brought the level of medicine in Milan up to the top for the time. A citizen of Chiavenna could study in the universities of Innsbruck, Vienna, Prague, Budapest. He could serve in the imperial army, become an officer, accede to the higher administration, and be ennobled. After the proclamation of the Sabaudian Regno d'Italia, Chiavenna followed the sort of the rest of Lombardy.

On 6 June 2000, a Catholic sister, Maria Laura Mainetti, was murdered in a satanic sacrifice by three teenage girls.

== People ==
- Peter, (3rd) Count de Salis (1738–1807). A popular governor, 1771–1773 and 1781–1783.
- Ima Agustoni (1935–2017), actress and writer of Italian educational materials, most famous for presenting Avanti! Avanti!.
- Astor family has its roots in Chiavenna
- Francesco Puppi, Italian trail runner

== Climate ==
Climate data for Chiavenna, elevation 332 m (1,089 ft), (1961–1990)
Month	Jan	Feb	Mar	Apr	May	Jun	Jul	Aug	Sep	Oct	Nov	Dec	Year
Mean daily maximum °C (°F)	6.0 (42.8)	8.7 (47.7)	13.5 (56.3)	17.8 (64.0)	22.1 (71.8)	26.0 (78.8)	28.4 (83.1)	27.1 (80.8)	22.9 (73.2)	16.8 (62.2)	10.5 (50.9)	6.8 (44.2)	17.2 (63.0)
Daily mean °C (°F)	2.8 (37.0)	4.9 (40.8)	8.9 (48.0)	12.8 (55.0)	16.6 (61.9)	20.1 (68.2)	22.6 (72.7)	21.6 (70.9)	18.1 (64.6)	12.9 (55.2)	7.2 (45.0)	3.7 (38.7)	12.7 (54.8)
Mean daily minimum °C (°F)	−0.4 (31.3)	1.2 (34.2)	4.3 (39.7)	7.9 (46.2)	11.1 (52.0)	14.3 (57.7)	16.8 (62.2)	16.1 (61.0)	13.4 (56.1)	8.9 (48.0)	4.0 (39.2)	0.7 (33.3)	8.2 (46.7)
Average precipitation mm (inches)	59 (2.3)	57 (2.2)	84 (3.3)	126 (5.0)	161 (6.3)	147 (5.8)	132 (5.2)	165 (6.5)	159 (6.3)	126 (5.0)	137 (5.4)	58 (2.3)	1,411 (55.6)
Source: Istituto Superiore per la Protezione e la Ricerca Ambientale
