= Lostallo =

- Municipality
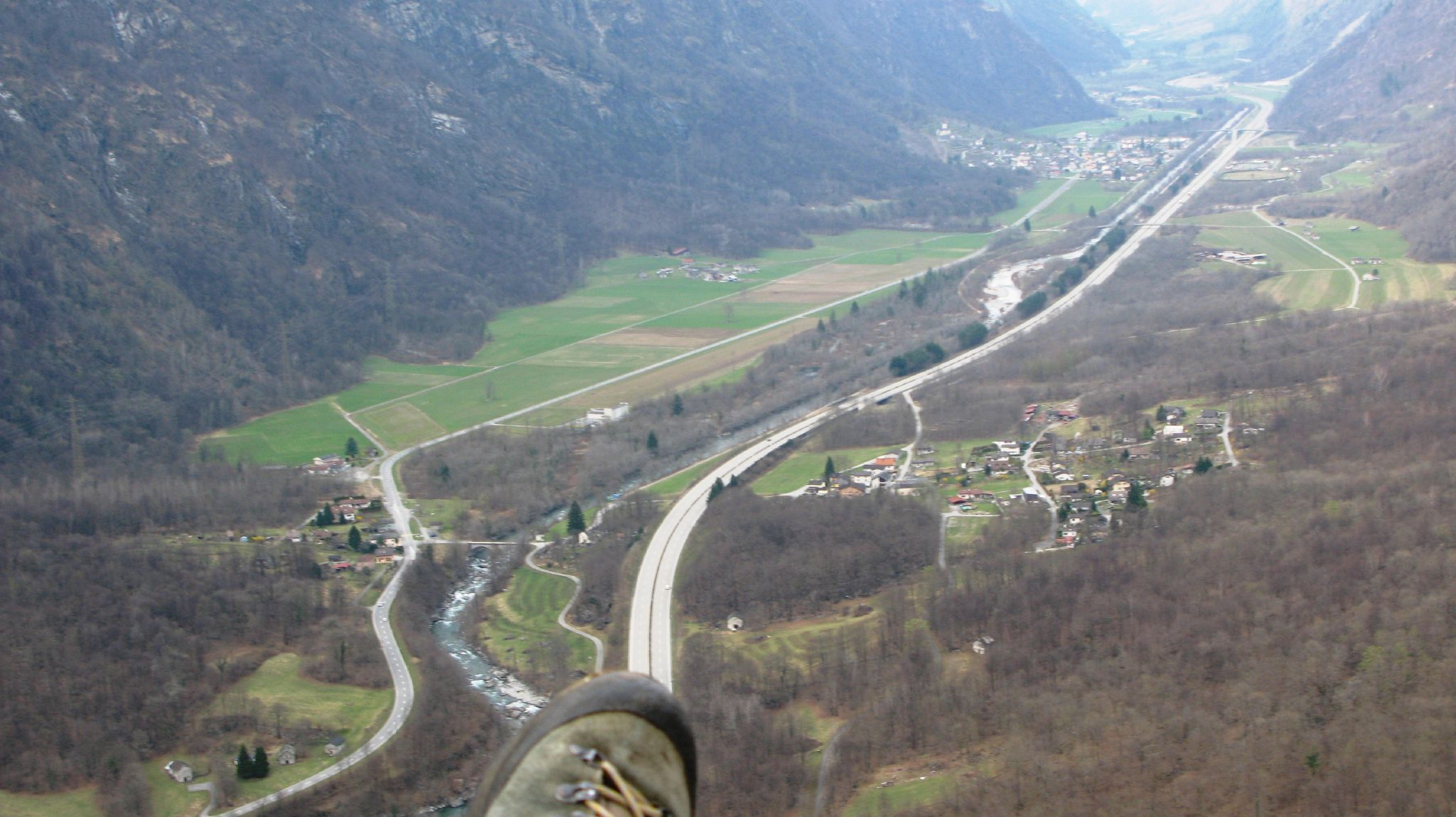

- Flag Coat of arms
- Location of Lostallo
- Location within Switzerland Location within Canton of Grisons
- Coordinates: 46°18′N 9°11′E
- Country: Switzerland
- Canton: Grisons
- District: Moesa

Area
  - Total: 50.91 km^{2} (19.66 sq mi)
- Elevation: 439 m (1,440 ft)

Population (December 2020)
  - Total: 840
  - Density: 16/km^{2} (43/sq mi)
- Time zone: UTC+01:00 (CET)
  - Summer (DST): UTC+02:00 (CEST)
- Postal code: 6558
- SFOS number: 3821
- ISO 3166 code: CH-GR
- Localities: Cabbiolo, Sorte
- Surrounded by: Cama, Cauco, Gordona (IT-SO), Menarola (IT-SO), Soazza, Verdabbio
- Website: www.lostallo.ch

Lostallo is a municipality in the Moesa Region in the Swiss canton of the Grisons.

== History ==
Lostallo is first mentioned in 1219.

== Geography ==
Aerial view (1953)

Lostallo has an area, as of 2006, of 50.9 km^{2} (19.7 sq mi). Of this area, 6.8% is used for agricultural purposes, while 59% is forested. Of the rest of the land, 1.8% is settled (buildings or roads) and the remainder (32.3%) is non-productive (rivers, glaciers or mountains).

Before 2017, the municipality was located in the Mesocco sub-district of the Moesa district on the right bank of the Moesa river. It consists of the village of Lostallo and the hamlets of Cabbiolo to the north and Sorte to the south.

== Demographics ==
Lostallo has a population (as of 31 December 2020) of 840. As of 2008, 11.7% of the population was made up of foreign nationals. Over the last 10 years the population has grown at a rate of 5%. Most of the population (as of 2000) speaks Italian (81.4%), with German being second most common (13.4%) and Portuguese being third ( 2.0%).

As of 2000, the gender distribution of the population was 50.9% male and 49.1% female. The age distribution, as of 2000, in Lostallo is; 80 children or 12.2% of the population are between 0 and 9 years old. 32 teenagers or 4.9% are 10 to 14, and 26 teenagers or 4.0% are 15 to 19. Of the adult population, 89 people or 13.6% of the population are between 20 and 29 years old. 115 people or 17.5% are 30 to 39, 91 people or 13.9% are 40 to 49, and 90 people or 13.7% are 50 to 59. The senior population distribution is 71 people or 10.8% of the population are between 60 and 69 years old, 45 people or 6.9% are 70 to 79, there are 15 people or 2.3% who are 80 to 89, and there are 2 people or 0.3% who are 90 to 99.

In the 2007 federal election the most popular party was the SP which received 35.3% of the vote. The next three most popular parties were the FDP (26.2%), the SVP (23.8%) and the CVP (14.3%).

The entire Swiss population is generally well educated. In Lostallo about 70.6% of the population (between age 25-64) have completed either non-mandatory upper secondary education or additional higher education (either university or a Fachhochschule).

Lostallo has an unemployment rate of 2.25%. As of 2005, there were 49 people employed in the primary economic sector and about 19 businesses involved in this sector. 50 people are employed in the secondary sector and there are 18 businesses in this sector. 45 people are employed in the tertiary sector, with 15 businesses in this sector.

The historical population is given in the following table:

| year | population |
|---|---|
| 1802 | 212 |
| 1850 | 363 |
| 1900 | 372 |
| 1950 | 424 |
| 2000 | 656 |
