= Soazza =

- Municipality
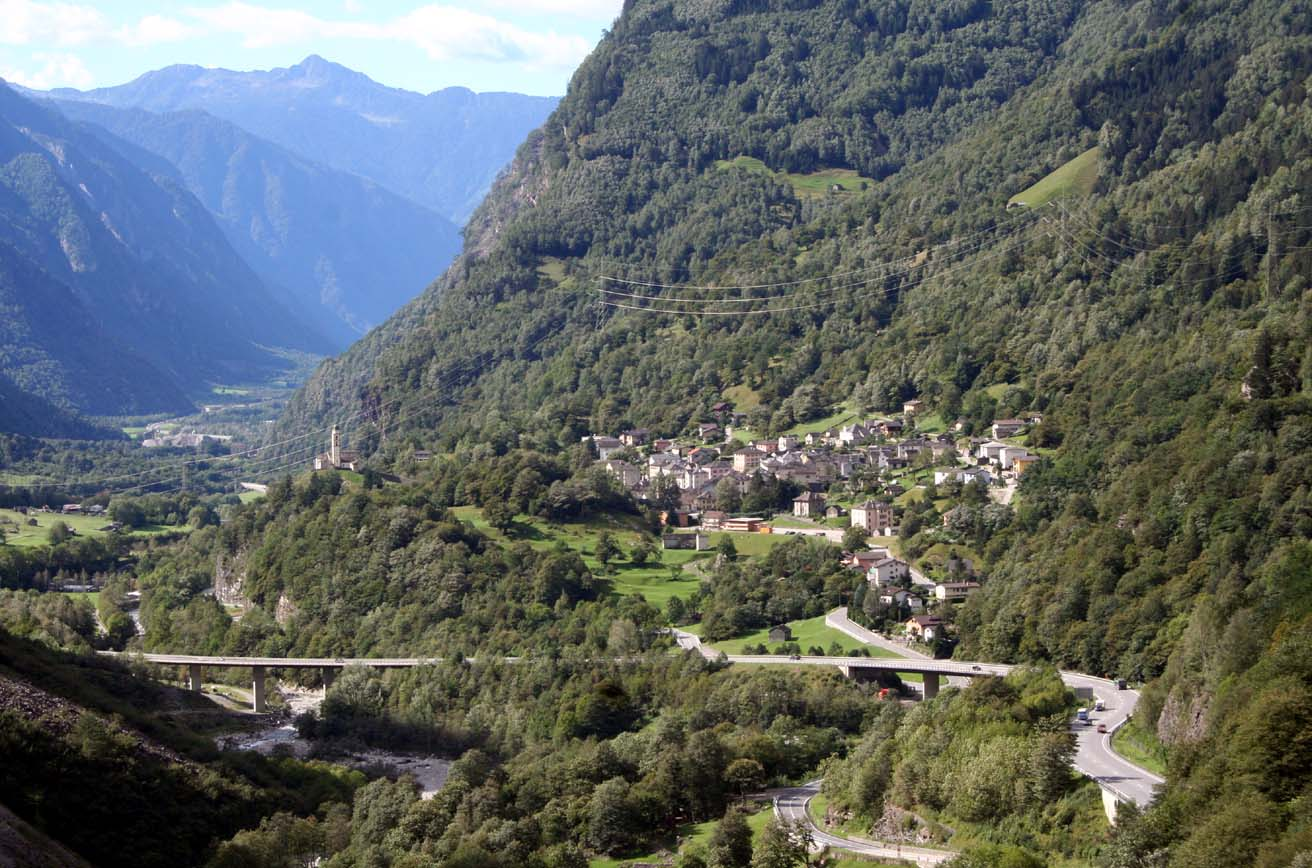

- Flag Coat of arms
- Location of Soazza
- Location within Switzerland Location within Canton of Grisons
- Coordinates: 46°21′N 9°13′E
- Country: Switzerland
- Canton: Grisons
- District: Moesa

Area
  - Total: 46.37 km^{2} (17.90 sq mi)
- Elevation: 620 m (2,030 ft)

Population (December 2020)
  - Total: 324
  - Density: 6.99/km^{2} (18.1/sq mi)
- Time zone: UTC+01:00 (CET)
  - Summer (DST): UTC+02:00 (CEST)
- Postal code: 6562
- SFOS number: 3823
- ISO 3166 code: CH-GR
- Surrounded by: Cauco, Lostallo, Menarola (IT-SO), Mesocco, Rossa, San Giacomo Filippo (IT-SO)
- Website: www.soazza.ch

Soazza is a municipality in the Moesa Region in the Swiss canton of the Grisons.

== History ==
Soazza is first mentioned in 1203 as Soaza.

== Geography ==
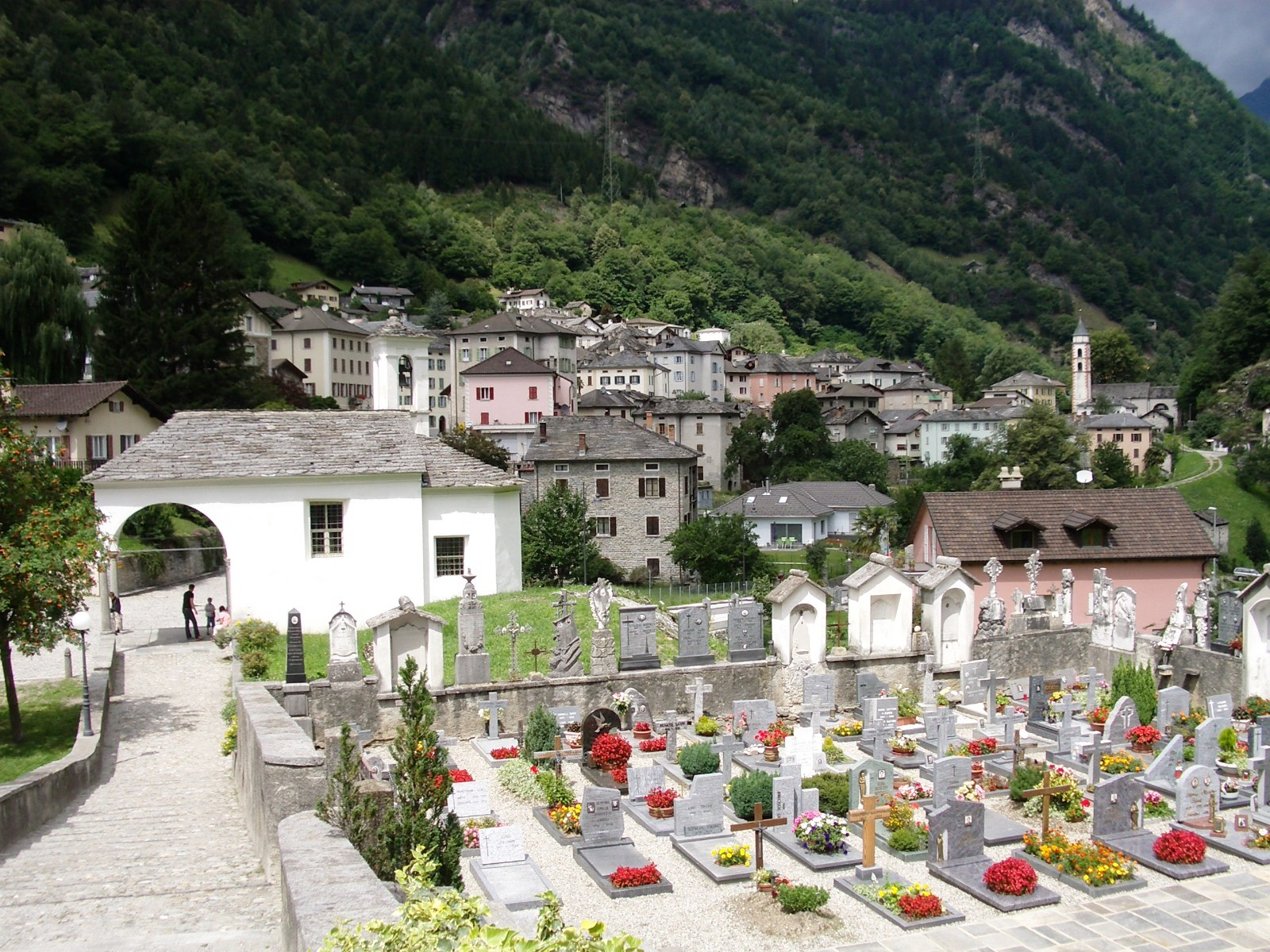
Soazza village

Aerial view (1953)

Soazza has an area, as of 2006, of 46.4 km^{2} (17.9 sq mi). Of this area, 7.2% is used for agricultural purposes, while 53.7% is forested. Of the rest of the land, 1.5% is settled (buildings or roads) and the remainder (37.7%) is non-productive (rivers, glaciers or mountains).

== Demographics ==
Soazza has a population (as of 31 December 2020) of 324. As of 2008, 11.9% of the population was made up of foreign nationals. Over the last 10 years the population has decreased at a rate of -6.9%. Most of the population (as of 2000) speaks Italian (91.9%), with German being second most common ( 3.3%) and Serbo-Croatian being third ( 2.2%).

As of 2000, the gender distribution of the population was 54.4% male and 45.6% female. The age distribution, as of 2000, in Soazza is; 37 children or 10.3% of the population are between 0 and 9 years old. 17 teenagers or 4.7% are 10 to 14, and 10 teenagers or 2.8% are 15 to 19. Of the adult population, 35 people or 9.7% of the population are between 20 and 29 years old. 64 people or 17.8% are 30 to 39, 49 people or 13.6% are 40 to 49, and 42 people or 11.7% are 50 to 59. The senior population distribution is 51 people or 14.2% of the population are between 60 and 69 years old, 37 people or 10.3% are 70 to 79, there are 16 people or 4.5% who are 80 to 89, and there is 1 person who is 90 to 99.

In the 2007 federal election the most popular party was the CVP which received 34.9% of the vote. The next three most popular parties were the SP (28.5%), the SVP (26%) and the FDP (9.2%).

In Soazza about 73.3% of the population (between age 25-64) have completed either non-mandatory upper secondary education or additional higher education (either university or a Fachhochschule).

Soazza has an unemployment rate of 2.6%. As of 2005, there were 24 people employed in the primary economic sector and about 9 businesses involved in this sector. 71 people are employed in the secondary sector and there are 7 businesses in this sector. 38 people are employed in the tertiary sector, with 14 businesses in this sector.

The historical population is given in the following table:

| year | population |
|---|---|
| 1650 | 427 |
| 1802 | 311 |
| 1850 | 315 |
| 1900 | 339 |
| 1950 | 348 |
| 2000 | 359 |

== Heritage sites of national significance ==
The Casa Paret, the Church of S. Martino including the della Madonna Addolorata and the Ospizio e Via Crucis are listed as Swiss heritage sites of national significance.

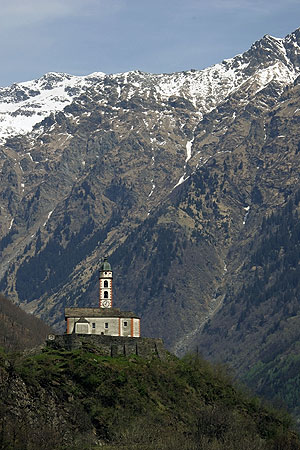
Church of S. Martino

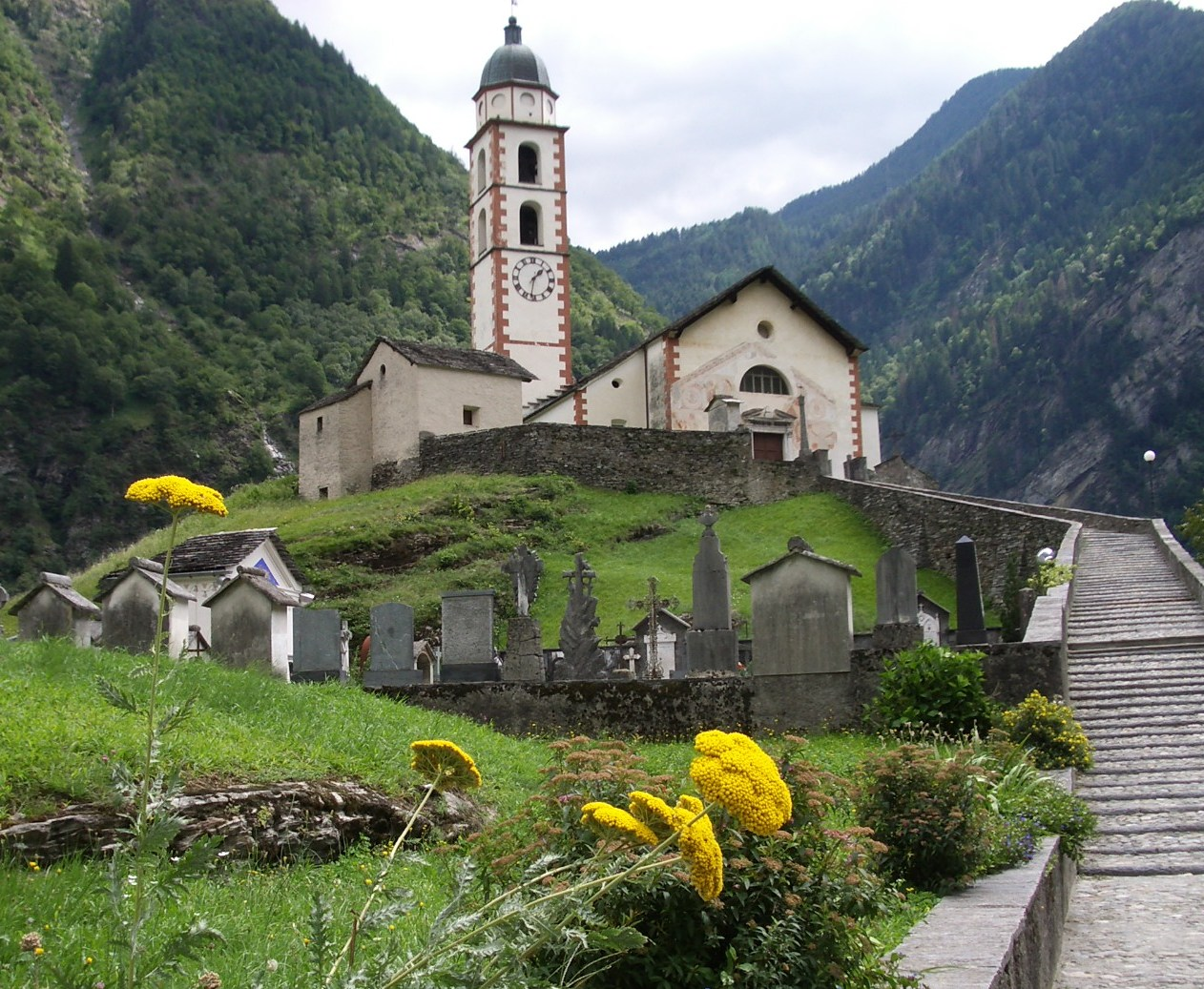
Church of S. Martino
