= Menarola =

- Comune
- Comune di Menarola
- Location within Italy Location within Lombardy
- Coordinates: 46°18′N 9°21′E
- Country: Italy
- Region: Lombardy
- Province: Province of Sondrio (SO)

Area
  - Total: 14.8 km^{2} (5.7 sq mi)
- Elevation: 720 m (2,360 ft)

Population (Dec. 2004)
  - Total: 40
  - Density: 2.7/km^{2} (7.0/sq mi)
- Time zone: UTC+1 (CET)
  - Summer (DST): UTC+2 (CEST)
- Postal code: 23022
- Dialing code: 0343

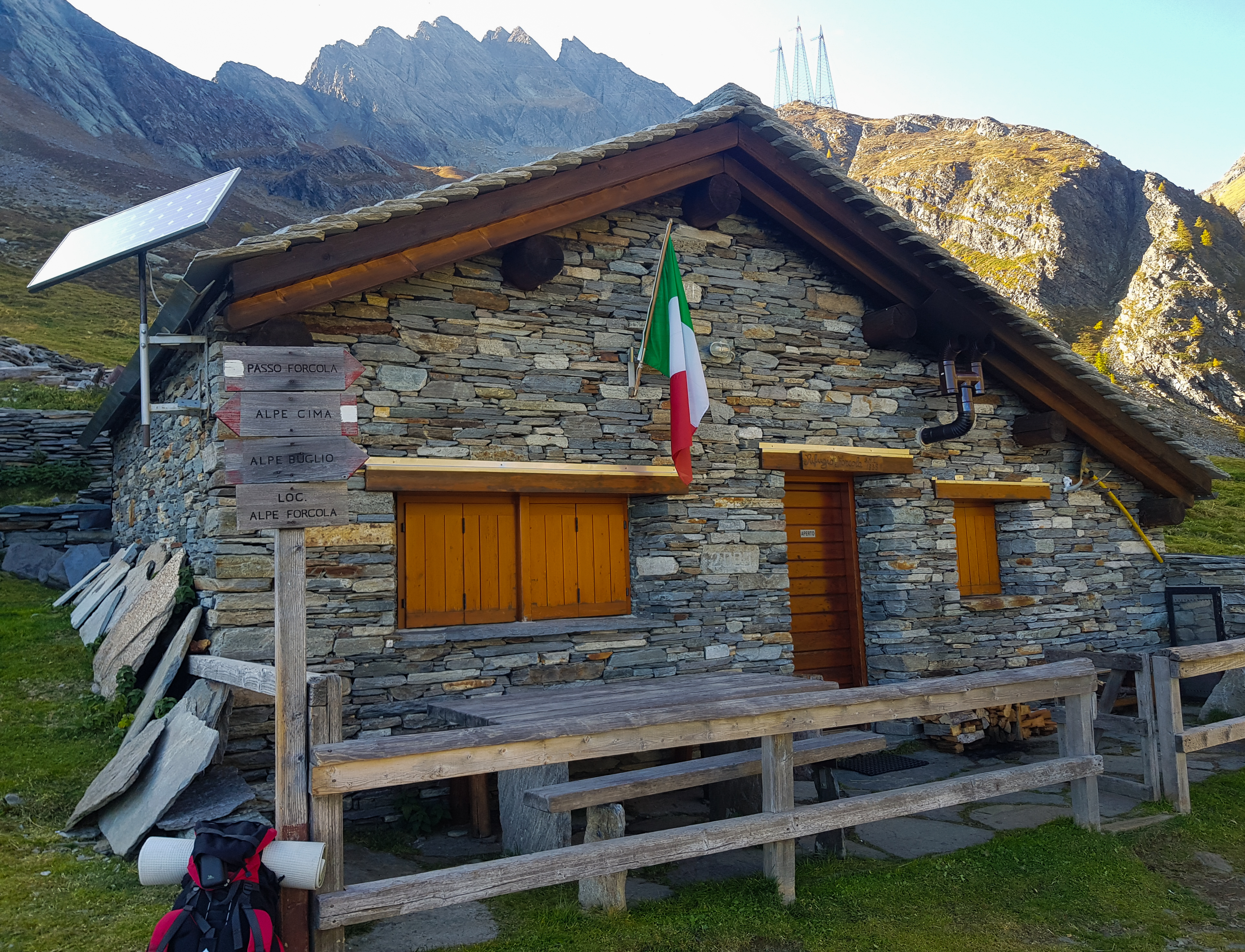
Sondrio, Lombady, Italy

Menarola is a frazione and a former comune (municipality) in the Province of Sondrio in the Italian region Lombardy, located about 90 kilometres (56 mi) north of Milan and about 45 kilometres (28 mi) northwest of Sondrio, on the border with Switzerland. As of 31 December 2004, it had a population of 40 and an area of 14.8 square kilometres (5.7 mi^{2}).

Menarola borders the following municipalities: Gordona, Lostallo (Switzerland), Mese, San Giacomo Filippo, Soazza (Switzerland).

== Demographic evolution ==
Historical population

Year	Pop.	±%
1861	342	—
1871	424	+24.0%
1881	416	−1.9%
1901	354	−14.9%
1911	330	−6.8%

Year	Pop.	±%
1921	317	−3.9%
1931	313	−1.3%
1936	277	−11.5%
1951	271	−2.2%
1961	189	−30.3%

Year	Pop.	±%
1971	154	−18.5%
1981	88	−42.9%
1991	49	−44.3%
2001	43	−12.2%

Source: Data from ISTAT
