= San Giacomo Filippo =

San Giacomo Filippo San Giacum (Lombard)
- Comune
- Comune di San Giacomo Filippo
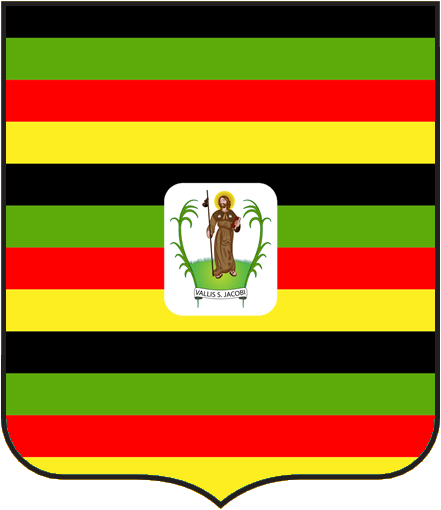
- Coat of arms

- Location within Italy Location within Lombardy
- Coordinates: 46°20′N 9°22′E
- Country: Italy
- Region: Lombardy
- Province: Province of Sondrio (SO)
- Frazioni: San Bernardo ai Monti, Olmo, Sommarovina, Sant'Antonio di Albareda, Dalò, Uggia, Gallivaggio, Lirone, Cimaganda, Vho

Area
  - Total: 62.1 km^{2} (24.0 sq mi)
- Elevation: 679 m (2,228 ft)

Population (Dec. 2004)
  - Total: 453
  - Density: 7.29/km^{2} (18.9/sq mi)
- Demonym: Filippesi
- Time zone: UTC+1 (CET)
  - Summer (DST): UTC+2 (CEST)
- Postal code: 23020
- Dialing code: 0343

San Giacomo Filippo (Alpine Lombard: San Giacum) is a comune (municipality) in the Province of Sondrio in the Italian region of Lombardy, located about 100 kilometres (62 mi) north of Milan and about 45 kilometres (28 mi) northwest of Sondrio, on the border with Switzerland. As of 31 December 2004, it had a population of 453 and an area of 62.1 square kilometres (24.0 mi^{2}).

The municipality of San Giacomo Filippo contains the frazioni (subdivisions, mainly villages and hamlets) San Bernardo ai Monti, Olmo, Sommarovina, Sant'Antonio di Albareda, Dalò, Uggia, Gallivaggio, Lirone, Cimaganda, Vho.

San Giacomo Filippo borders the following municipalities: Campodolcino, Chiavenna, Menarola, Mese, Mesocco (Switzerland), Piuro, Soazza (Switzerland).

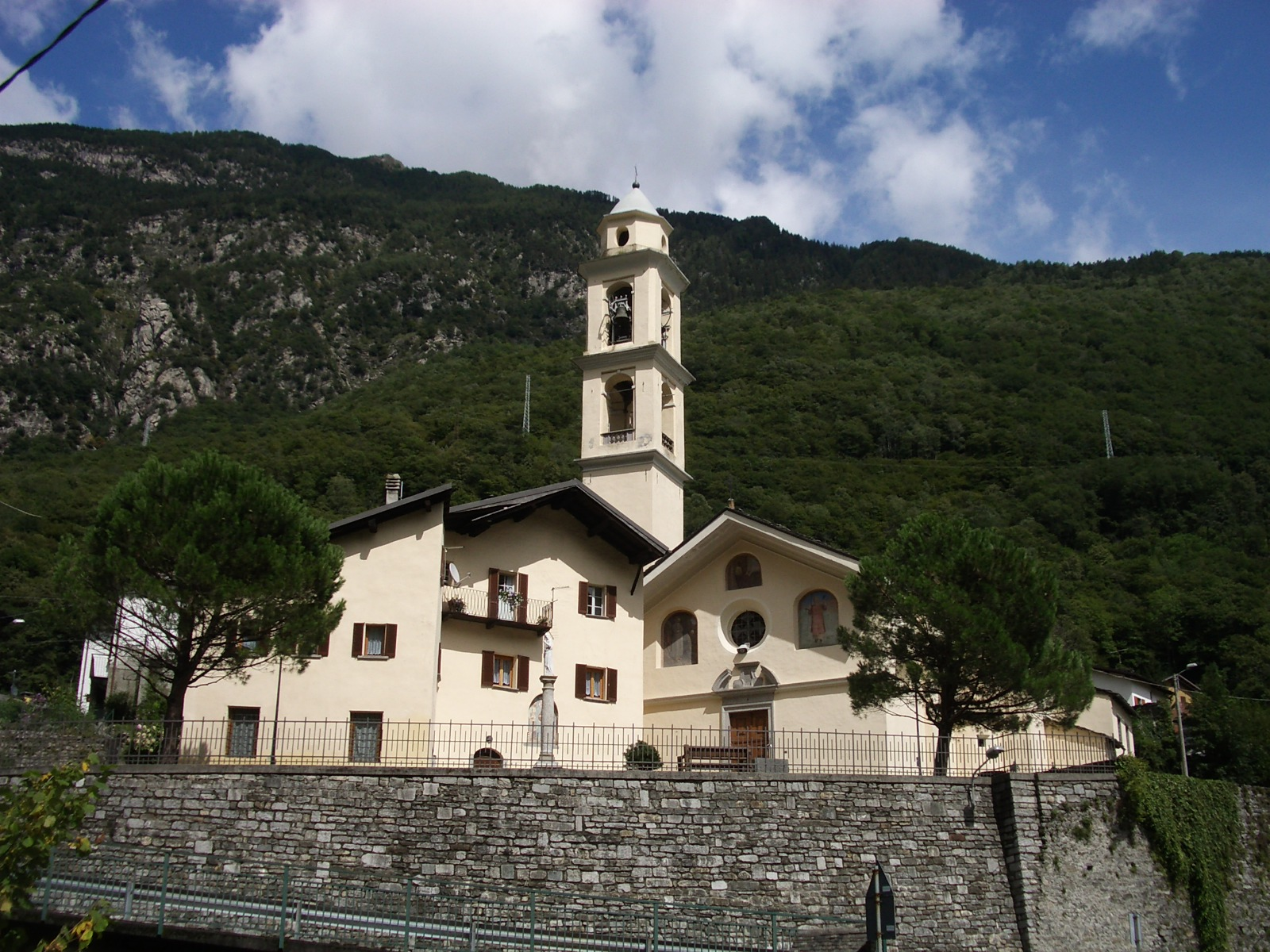
the church of the town

== Demographic evolution ==
Historical population

Year	Pop.	±%
1861	1,649	—
1871	1,746	+5.9%
1881	1,632	−6.5%
1901	1,721	+5.5%
1911	1,550	−9.9%

Year	Pop.	±%
1921	1,548	−0.1%
1931	1,244	−19.6%
1936	1,270	+2.1%
1951	1,206	−5.0%
1961	1,069	−11.4%

Year	Pop.	±%
1971	865	−19.1%
1981	674	−22.1%
1991	576	−14.5%
2001	472	−18.1%

Source: Data from ISTAT
