= Splügen Pass =

Mountain pass of the Lepontine Alps between Switzerland and Italy

- German: Splügenpass; Italian: Passo dello Spluga
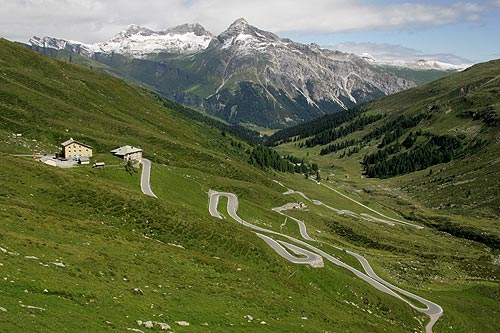
- The Splügen Pass from the Swiss side

- Location within Alps
- Elevation: 2,114 metres (6,936 ft)
- Traversed by: Road

Third Approach
- Location: Lombardy, Italy; Graubünden, Switzerland
- Range: Lepontine Alps
- Coordinates: 46°30′20″N 09°19′49″E
- Topo map: Swiss Federal Office of Topography swisstopo

The Splügen Pass (German: Splügenpass; Italian: Passo dello Spluga; Romansh: Pass dal Spleia 2,114 m (6,936 ft)) is an Alpine mountain pass of the Lepontine Alps. It connects Splügen in the Swiss canton of Graubünden 5 kilometres (3.1 mi) to the north, 675 metres (2,215 ft) below the pass, with the Italian municipality of Chiavenna 21 kilometres (13 mi) to the south at the end of the Valle San Giacomo, 1,789 metres (5,869 ft) below the pass.

== Geography ==
The pass road connects the Swiss Hinterrhein valley and Splügen in the canton of Graubünden with the Valle San Giacomo and Chiavenna in the Italian province of Sondrio, the road continuing to Lake Como. The pass is the water divide between the drainage basins of the Rhine, which flows into the North Sea, and the Po, which flows into the Adriatic. The pass is overlooked by Pizzo Tambo and the Surettahorn, on its western and eastern side, respectively. On the Italian side of the pass is Montespluga, a small three street village that is cut off from both Italy and Switzerland during the winter.

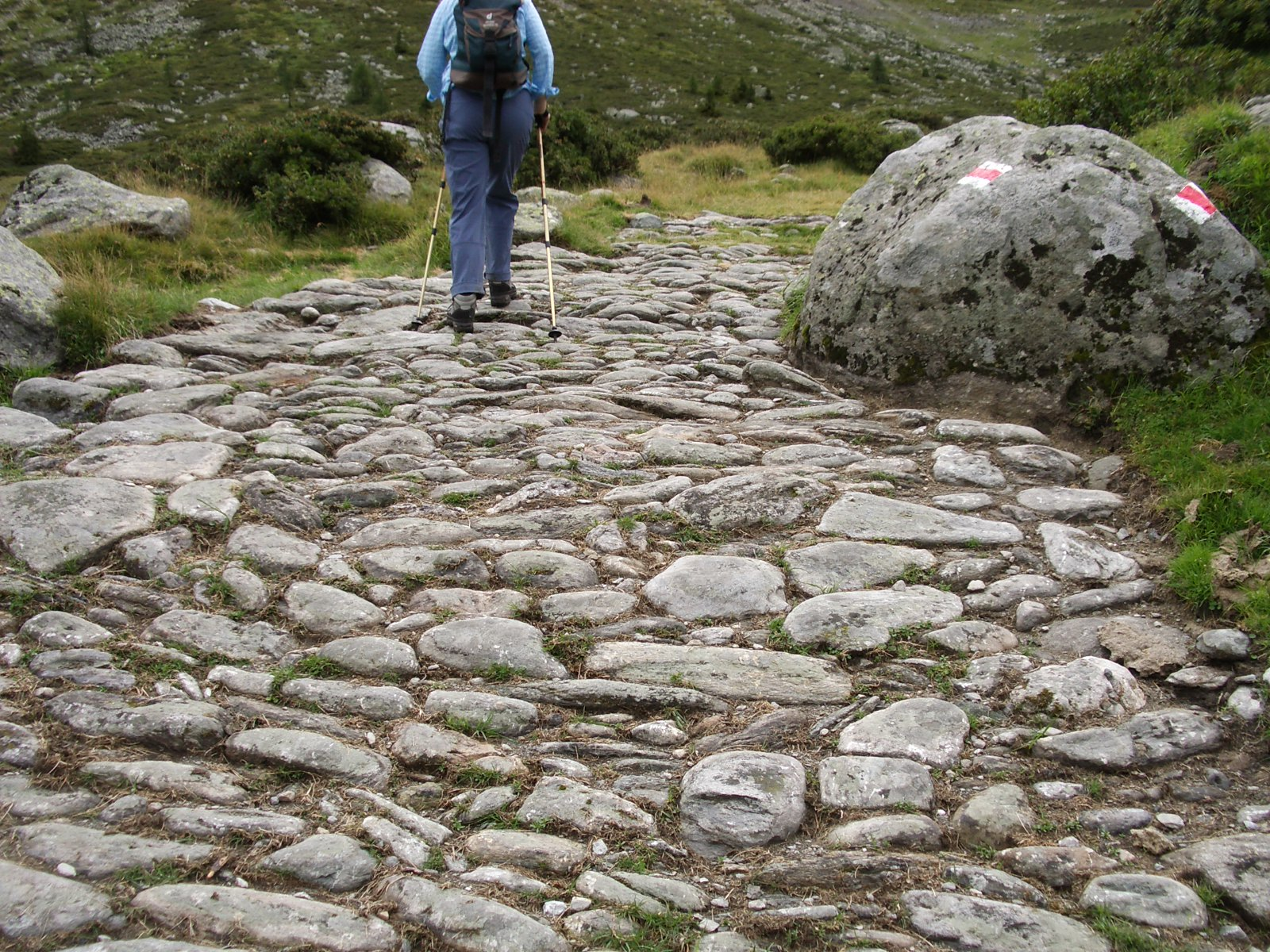
Historic Via Spluga

Since the opening of the San Bernardino road tunnel in 1967, the pass has lost its former importance; it is not kept open in winter. Thanks to its lack of importance, it is now a quiet pass where essential portions of the historical roads have survived allowing a good historical review for hikers on the Via Spluga.

== History ==
The pass was in use in the Roman era. It possibly corresponds to Cunus Aureus shown on the Tabula Peutingeriana (which may alternatively have referred to the Julier Pass). The name Splügen itself is possibly derived from specula ("lookout"). In the Middle Ages, the bishops of Chur had the trade route relocated to Septimer Pass.

From 1818 to 1823 the modern road was built at the behest of the Austrian authorities, then ruling the Kingdom of Lombardy–Venetia in the south. In 1840, author Mary Shelley traveled through the pass on the way to Lake Como with her son. She describes the pass in her travel narrative, Rambles in Germany and Italy, published in 1844:

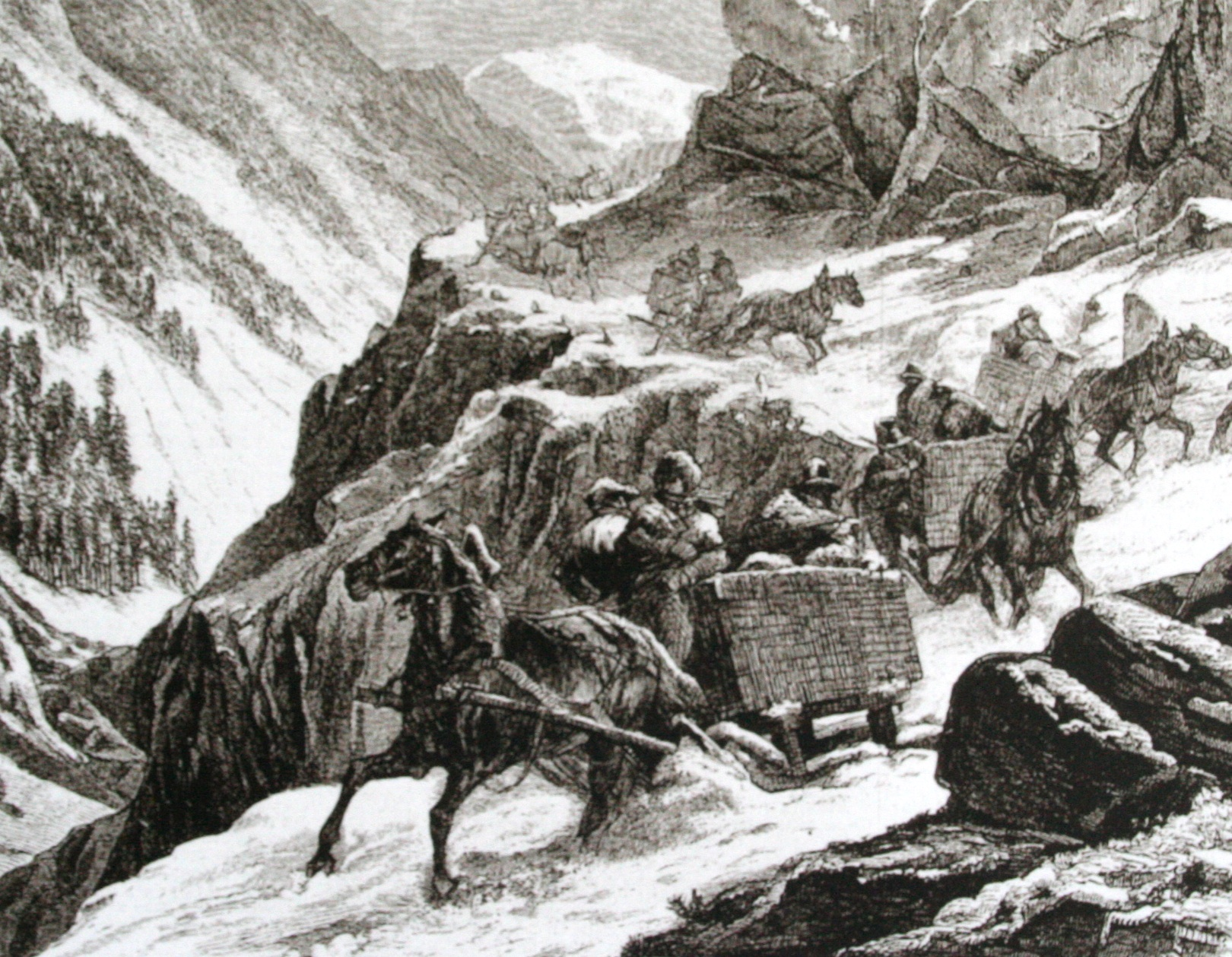
Historic depiction of crossing Splügen Pass in winter

A few years ago, there was no path except across this mountain, which being very exposed, and difficult even to danger, the Splugen was only traversed by shepherds and travellers of the country on mules or on foot. But now, a new and most marvellous road has been constructed - the mountain in question is, to the extent of several miles, cleft from the summit to the base, and a sheer precipice of 4000 feet rises on either side. The Rhine, swift and strong, but in width a span, flows in the narrow depth below. The road has been constructed on the face of the precipice, now cut into the side, now perforated through the living rock into galleries: it passes, at intervals, from one side of the ravine to the other, and bridges of a single arch span the chasm. The precipices, indeed approach so near, in parts, that a fallen tree could not reach the river below, but lay wedged in mid-way. It may be imagined how singular and sublime this pass is, in its naked simplicity. After proceeding about a mile, you look back and see the country you had left, through the narrow opening of the gigantic crags, set like a painting in this cloud-reaching frame. It is giddy work to look down over the parapet that protects the road, and mark the arrowy rushing of the imprisoned river. Mid-way in the pass, the precipices approach so near that you might fancy that a strong man could leap across."

In 1843 the road was further expanded with a 312 m (1,024 ft) long avalanche gallery designed by the Swiss engineer Richard La Nicca which today is out of use but largely preserved. Plans to build a railroad line across Splügen Pass were abandoned in favour of the Gotthard railway line, which opened in 1882.

The Pass is also mentioned in Arthur Conan Doyle's The Adventure of the Illustrious Client, a Sherlock Holmes short story of 1924. The Austrian Baron Adalbert Grüner, the villain of the story, murdered his wife by throwing her from the Pass, although Holmes cannot prove it.

== See also ==
- List of highest paved roads in Europe
- List of mountain passes
- List of the highest Swiss passes

== Bibliography ==
- Nicola Pfund, Sui passi in bicicletta - Swiss Alpine passes by bicycle, Fontana Edizioni, 2012, p. 140-145. ISBN 978-88-8191-281-0
