= Prata Camportaccio =

- Comune
- Comune di Prata Camportaccio
- Location within Italy Location within Lombardy
- Coordinates: 46°19′N 9°24′E
- Country: Italy
- Region: Lombardy
- Province: Province of Sondrio (SO)

Area
  - Total: 27.9 km^{2} (10.8 sq mi)

Population (Dec. 2004)
  - Total: 2,758
  - Density: 98.9/km^{2} (256/sq mi)
- Time zone: UTC+1 (CET)
  - Summer (DST): UTC+2 (CEST)
- Postal code: 23020
- Dialing code: 0343

Prata Camportaccio is a comune (municipality) in the Province of Sondrio in the Italian region Lombardy, located about 100 kilometres (62 mi) north of Milan and about 40 kilometres (25 mi) northwest of Sondrio. As of 31 December 2004, it had a population of 2,758 and an area of 27.9 square kilometres (10.8 mi^{2}).

Prata Camportaccio borders the following municipalities: Chiavenna, Gordona, Mese, Novate Mezzola, Piuro, Samolaco.

== Demographic evolution ==
Historical population

Year	Pop.	±%
1861	1,091	—
1871	1,096	+0.5%
1881	1,245	+13.6%
1901	1,275	+2.4%
1911	1,248	−2.1%
1921	1,414	+13.3%

Year	Pop.	±%
1931	1,443	+2.1%
1936	1,504	+4.2%
1951	1,583	+5.3%
1961	1,706	+7.8%
1971	1,926	+12.9%
1981	2,239	+16.3%

Year	Pop.	±%
1991	2,570	+14.8%
2001	2,727	+6.1%
2011	2,921	+7.1%
2021	2,918	−0.1%

Source: Data from ISTAT
