= Piuro =

- Comune
- Comune di Piuro
- Location within Italy Location within Lombardy
- Coordinates: 46°20′N 9°25′E
- Country: Italy
- Region: Lombardy
- Province: Province of Sondrio (SO)
- Frazioni: Savogno

Area
  - Total: 85.4 km^{2} (33.0 sq mi)

Population (Dec. 2004)
  - Total: 1,938
  - Density: 22.7/km^{2} (58.8/sq mi)
- Time zone: UTC+1 (CET)
  - Summer (DST): UTC+2 (CEST)
- Postal code: 23020
- Dialing code: 0343
- Website: Official website

Piuro (Piür in the local dialect) is a comune (municipality) in the Province of Sondrio in the Italian region Lombardy, located about 100 kilometres (62 mi) north of Milan and about 40 kilometres (25 mi) northwest of Sondrio, on the border with Switzerland. As of 31 December 2004, it had a population of 1,938 and an area of 85.4 square kilometres (33.0 mi^{2}).

The municipality of Piuro contains the frazione (subdivision) Savogno.

Piuro borders the following municipalities: Avers (Switzerland), Campodolcino, Chiavenna, Ferrera (Switzerland), Madesimo, Novate Mezzola, Prata Camportaccio, San Giacomo Filippo, Soglio (Switzerland), Villa di Chiavenna.

On 4 September 1618, Piuro (then belonging to the Three Leagues) was the site of one of the worst landslides in recorded history. The event, described as an avalanche (somewhat inaccurately as it was more probably a mudslide), completely wiped out Piuro and killed between 1,000 and 2,500 people.

== Demographic evolution ==
Historical population

Year	Pop.	±%
1861	1,796	—
1871	1,997	+11.2%
1881	2,061	+3.2%
1901	1,914	−7.1%
1911	1,764	−7.8%

Year	Pop.	±%
1921	1,746	−1.0%
1931	1,869	+7.0%
1936	1,647	−11.9%
1951	1,823	+10.7%
1961	1,694	−7.1%

Year	Pop.	±%
1971	1,564	−7.7%
1981	1,697	+8.5%
1991	1,713	+0.9%
2001	1,913	+11.7%

Source: Data from ISTAT
