= Gordona =

- Comune
- Comune di Gordona
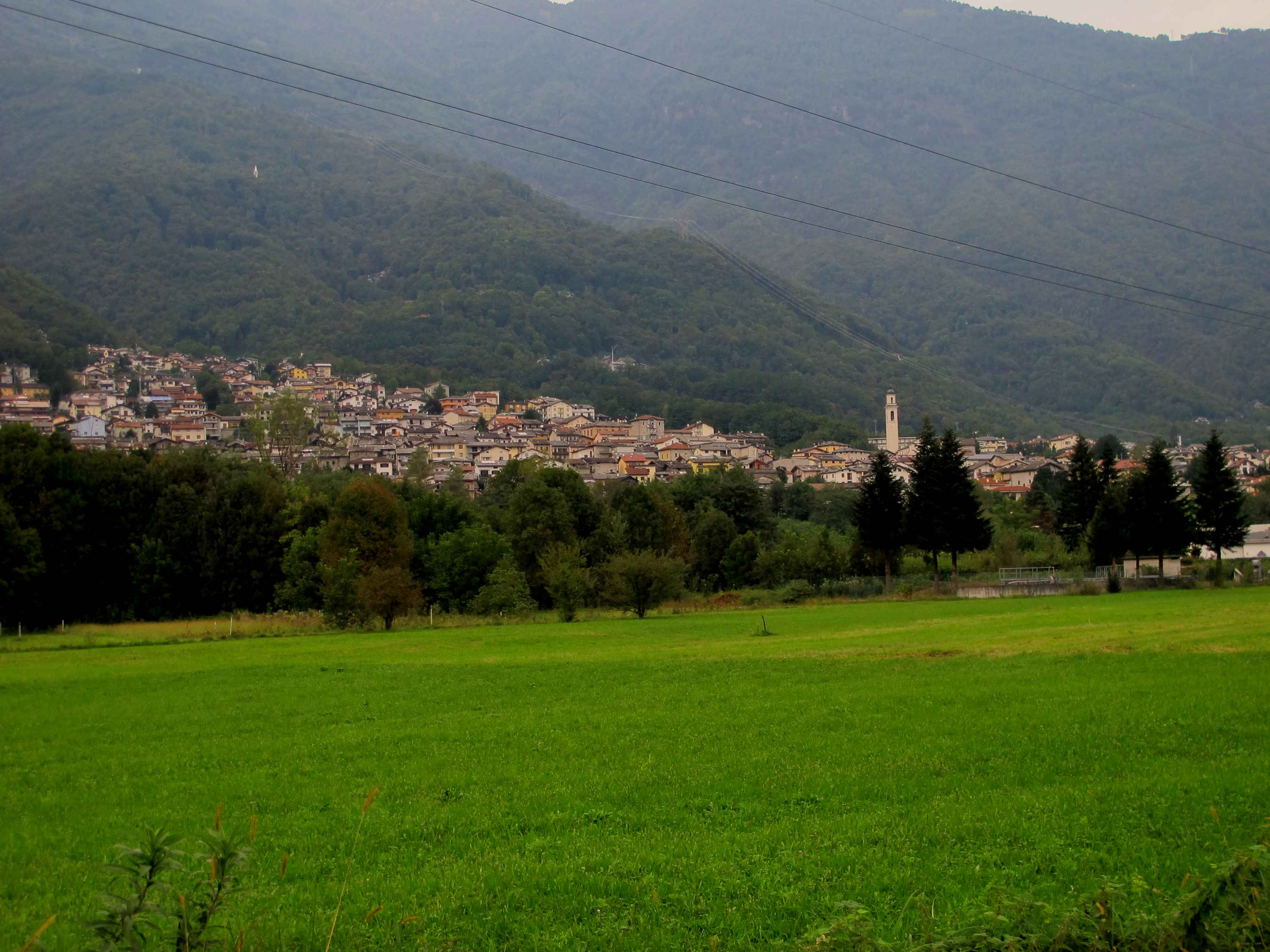
- Gordona

- Location within Italy Location within Lombardy
- Coordinates: 46°17′N 9°22′E
- Country: Italy
- Region: Lombardy
- Province: Province of Sondrio (SO)

Area
  - Total: 49.0 km^{2} (18.9 sq mi)

Population (Dec. 2004)
  - Total: 1,770
  - Density: 36.1/km^{2} (93.6/sq mi)
- Time zone: UTC+1 (CET)
  - Summer (DST): UTC+2 (CEST)
- Postal code: 23020
- Dialing code: 0343
- Website: Official website

Gordona is a comune (municipality) in the Province of Sondrio in the Italian region Lombardy, located about 90 kilometres (56 mi) north of Milan and about 40 kilometres (25 mi) northwest of Sondrio, on the border with Switzerland. As of 31 December 2004, it had a population of 1,770 and an area of 49.0 square kilometres (18.9 mi^{2}).

Gordona borders the following municipalities: Cama (Switzerland), Livo, Lostallo (Switzerland), Menarola, Mese, Prata Camportaccio, Samolaco, Verdabbio (Switzerland).

== History ==
With the approval of the regional law in n. 35 of the Lombardy Region on 6 November 2015, the former municipality of Menarola was merged by incorporation into the municipality of Gordona, restoring the situation prior to a decision by the Grisons in the 18th century.

== Demographic evolution ==
Historical population

Year	Pop.	±%
1861	1,182	—
1871	1,320	+11.7%
1881	1,314	−0.5%
1901	1,524	+16.0%
1911	1,514	−0.7%

Year	Pop.	±%
1921	1,376	−9.1%
1931	1,409	+2.4%
1936	1,395	−1.0%
1951	1,544	+10.7%
1961	1,459	−5.5%

Year	Pop.	±%
1971	1,503	+3.0%
1981	1,621	+7.9%
1991	1,637	+1.0%
2001	1,751	+7.0%

Source: Data from ISTAT
