= Mese, Lombardy =

Mese
- Comune
- Comune di Mese
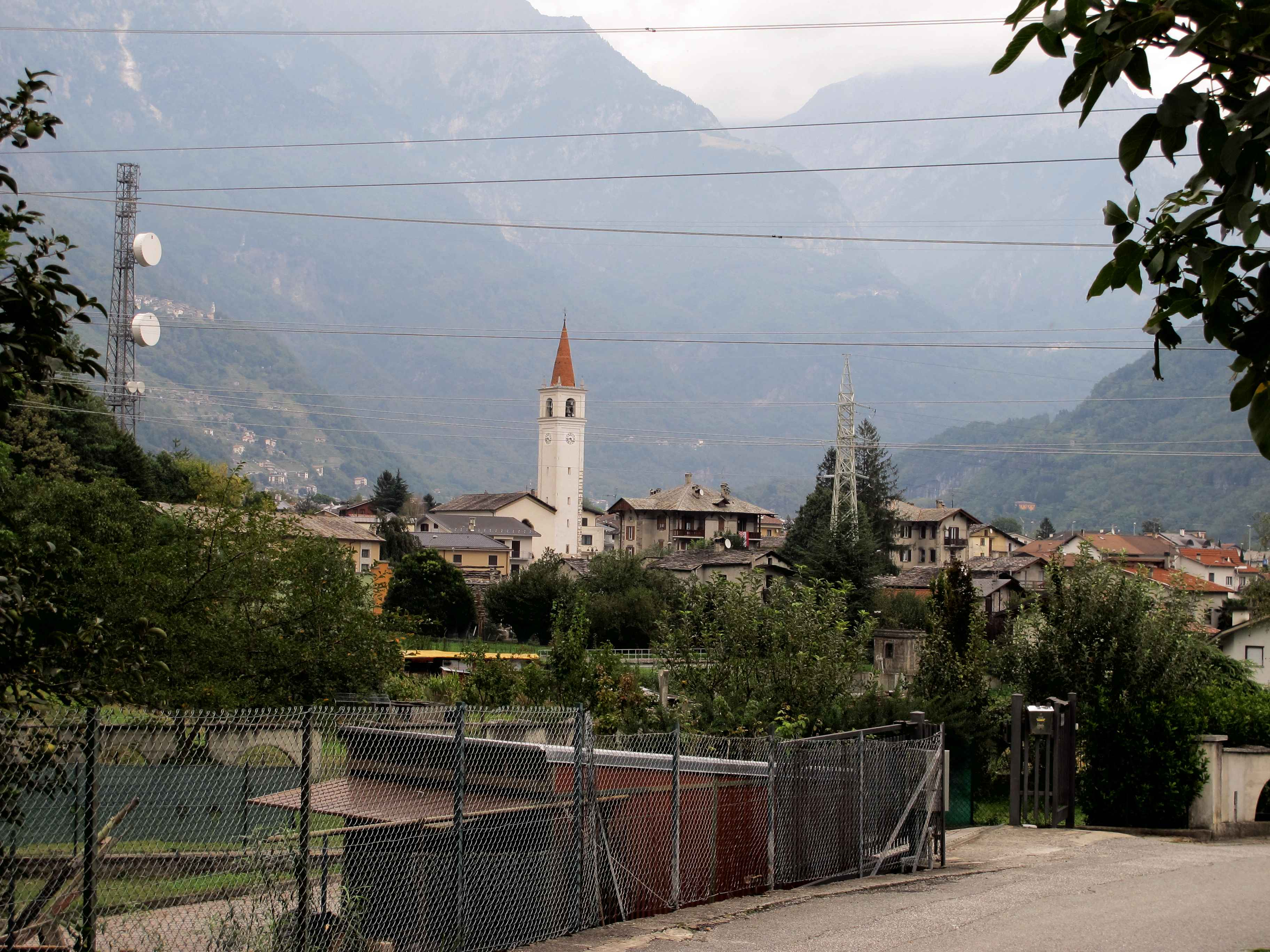

- Location within Italy Location within Lombardy
- Coordinates: 46°18′N 9°23′E
- Country: Italy
- Region: Lombardy
- Province: Sondrio (SO)

Government
  - Mayor: Paolo Cipriani

Area
  - Total: 4.15 km^{2} (1.60 sq mi)
- Elevation: 274 m (899 ft)

Population (31 May 2022)
  - Total: 1,812
  - Density: 437/km^{2} (1,130/sq mi)
- Demonym: Masuati
- Time zone: UTC+1 (CET)
  - Summer (DST): UTC+2 (CEST)
- Postal code: 23020
- Dialing code: 0343
- Website: Official website

Mese is a comune (municipality) in the Province of Sondrio in the Italian region Lombardy, located about 90 kilometres (56 mi) north of Milan and about 40 kilometres (25 mi) northwest of Sondrio.

Mese borders the following municipalities: Chiavenna, Gordona, Menarola, Prata Camportaccio, San Giacomo Filippo.
