= Madesimo =

- Comune
- Comune di Madesimo
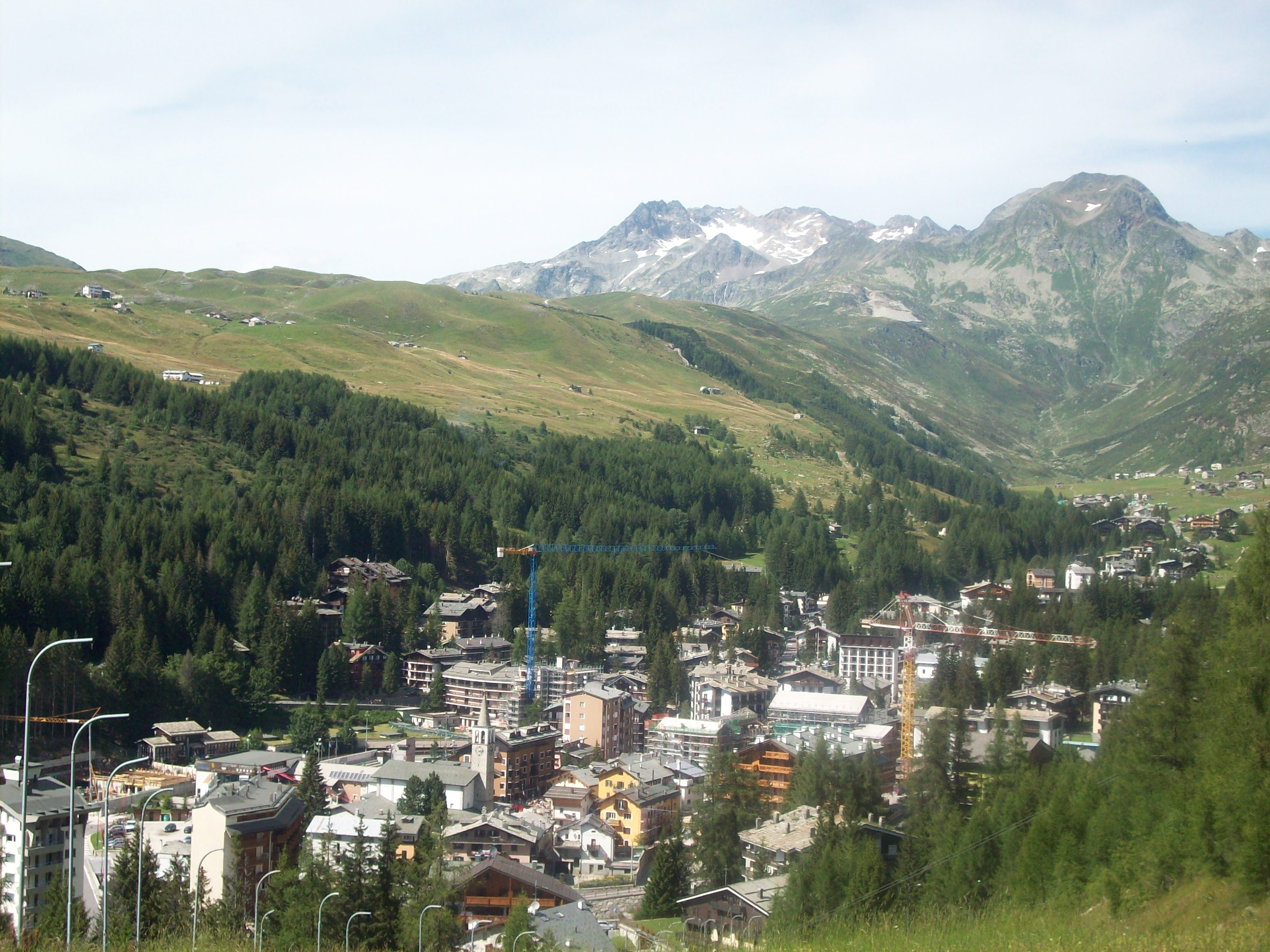

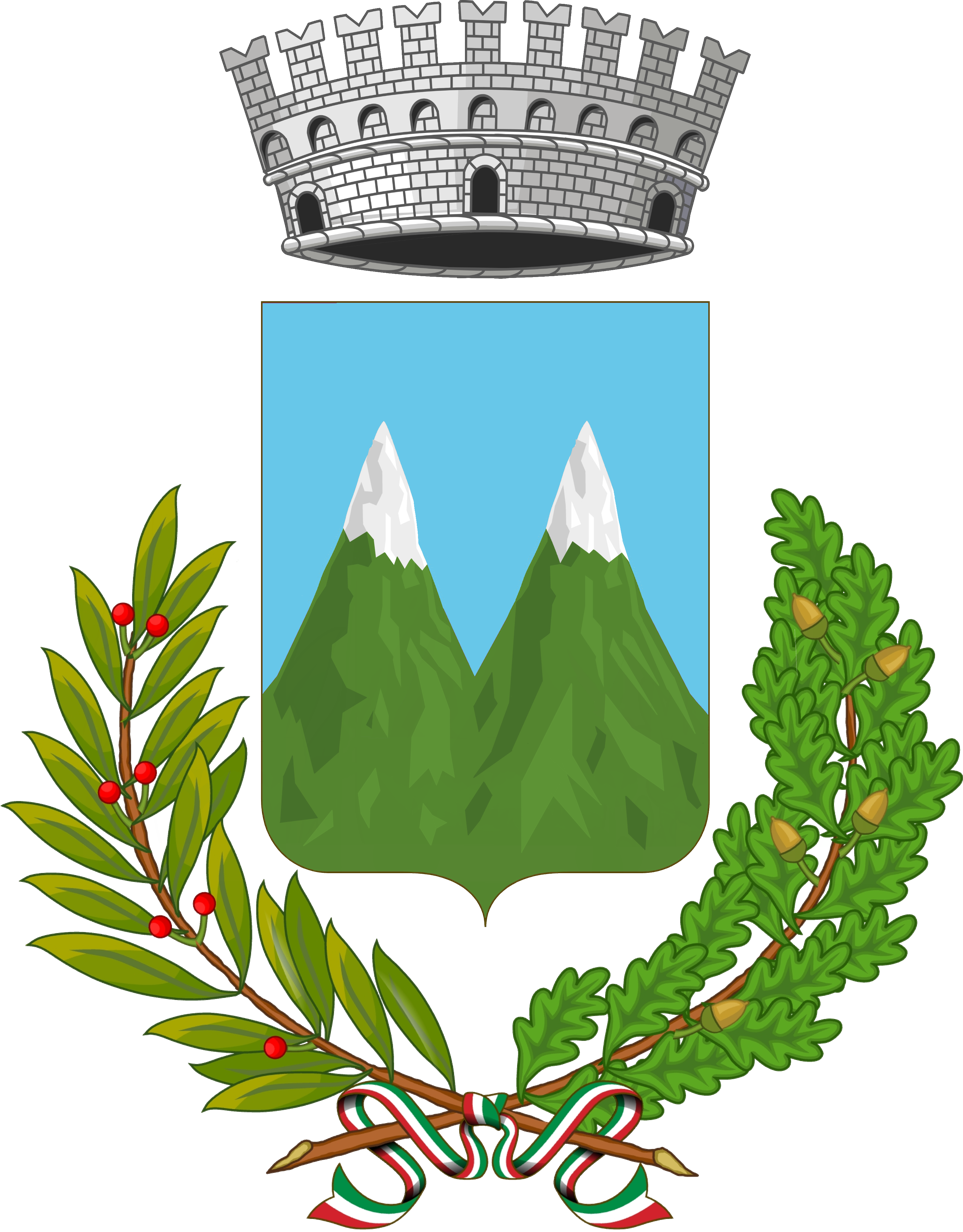
- Coat of arms

- Location within Italy Location within Lombardy
- Coordinates: 46°26′N 9°21′E
- Country: Italy
- Region: Lombardy
- Province: Sondrio (SO)
- Frazioni: Isola, Montespluga, Pianazzo

Government
  - Mayor: Franco Masanti

Area
  - Total: 85.4 km^{2} (33.0 sq mi)
- Elevation: 1,399 m (4,590 ft)

Population (Dec. 2004)
  - Total: 597
  - Density: 6.99/km^{2} (18.1/sq mi)
- Demonym: Isolani or Madesimini
- Time zone: UTC+1 (CET)
  - Summer (DST): UTC+2 (CEST)
- Postal code: 23024
- Dialing code: 0343
- Website: Official website

Madesimo (Italian pronunciation: [maˈdɛːzimo, maˈdeːzimo], called Isolato until 1983) is a comune (municipality) in the Province of Sondrio in the Italian region Lombardy, located about 110 kilometres (68 mi) north of Milan and about 50 kilometres (31 mi) northwest of Sondrio, on the border with Switzerland.

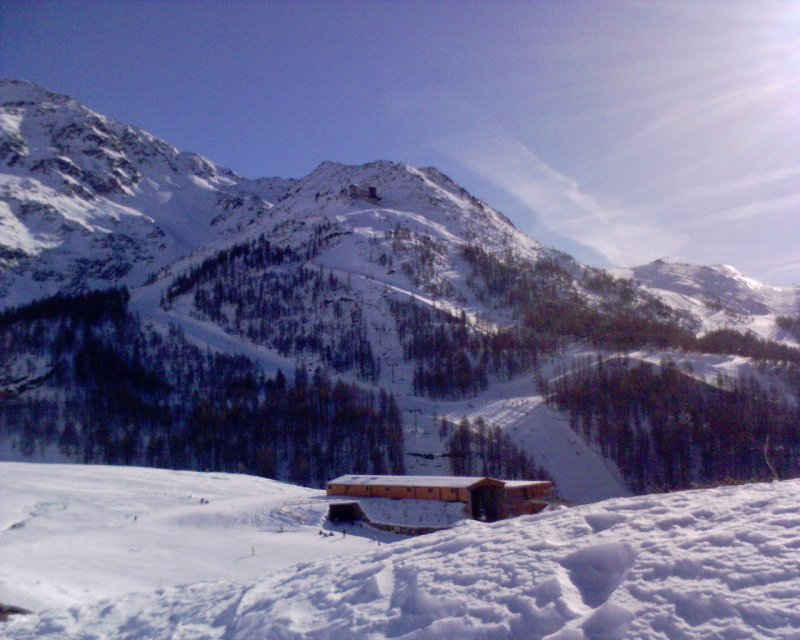
Madesimo in winter

Madesimo borders the following municipalities: Campodolcino, Ferrera (Switzerland), Medels im Rheinwald (Switzerland), Mesocco (Switzerland), Piuro, Splügen (Switzerland), Sufers (Switzerland).

Madesimo is a popular place for winter sports and summer holidays, and offers a variety of slopes and hills for both skiing and snowboarding. It features over 30 slopes which range from beginners to expert level. Among the slopes present in Madesimo is the Canalone, an off-the-track slope considered to be one of the most challenging in the Alps. During the summer, there are many hike-able trails and paths that run up the mountains. It is here that the Tuscan poet Giosuè Carducci would come in search of inspiration for his works. The main avenue in Madesimo is named after him.
