= Campodolcino =

Campodolcino Candulscin (Lombard)
- Comune
- Comune di Campodolcino
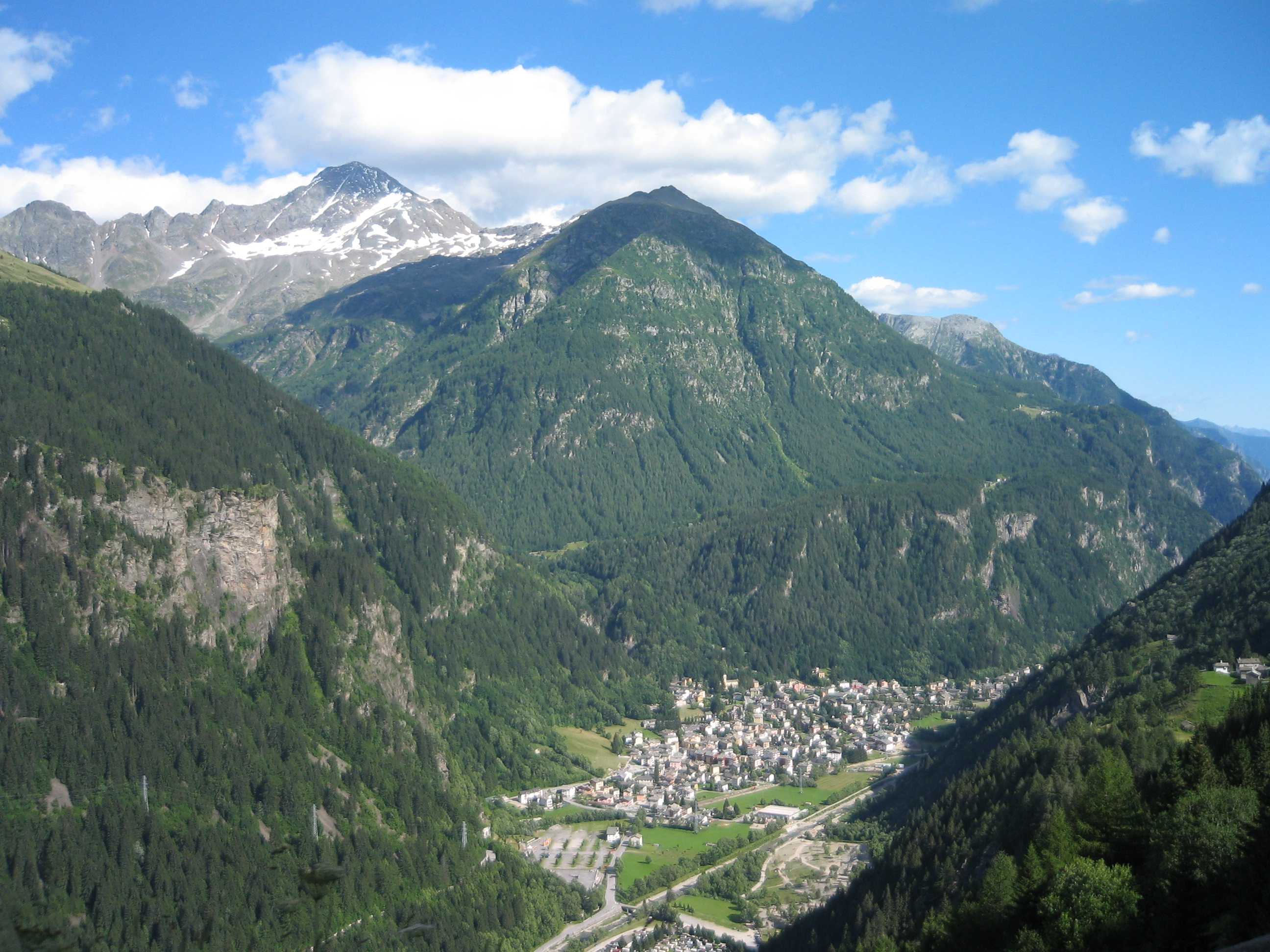

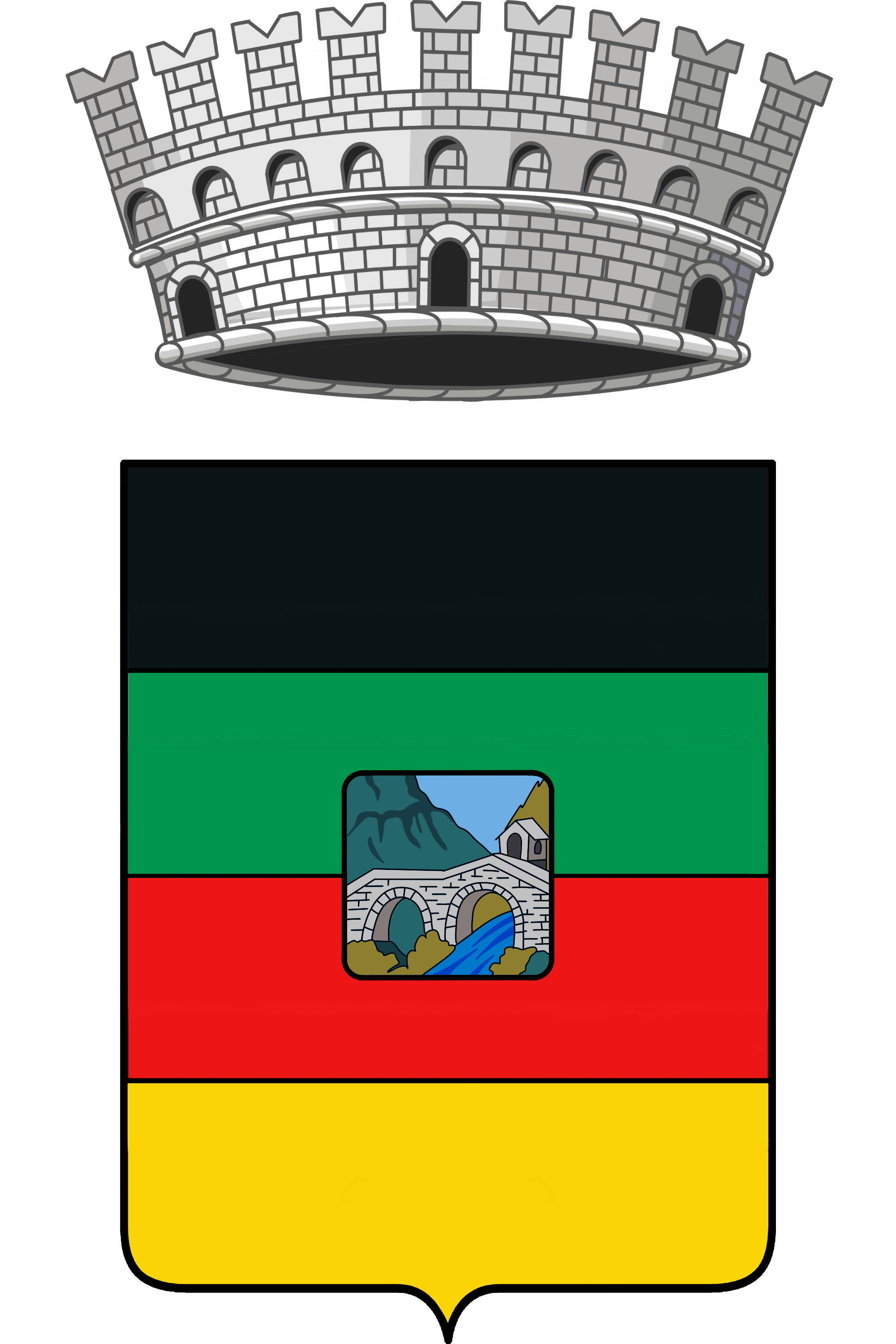
- Flag Coat of arms

- Location within Italy Location within Lombardy
- Coordinates: 46°24′N 9°21′E
- Country: Italy
- Region: Lombardy
- Province: Province of Sondrio (SO)
- Frazioni: Tini, Strarleggia, Fraciscio, Motta, Corti, Acero, Pietra, Prestone, Portarezza, Gualdera

Government
  - Mayor: Enrica Guanella (elected 2017-06-11)

Area
  - Total: 48.3 km^{2} (18.6 sq mi)
- Elevation: 1,071 m (3,514 ft)

Population (Apr. 2017)
  - Total: 947
  - Density: 19.6/km^{2} (50.8/sq mi)
- Demonym: Campodolcinesi
- Time zone: UTC+1 (CET)
  - Summer (DST): UTC+2 (CEST)
- Postal code: 23021
- Dialing code: 0343
- Website: Official website

Campodolcino (Lombard: Candulscin) is a comune (municipality) in the Province of Sondrio in the Italian region of Lombardy, located about 100 kilometres (62 mi) north of Milan and about 50 kilometres (31 mi) northwest of Sondrio, on the border with Switzerland. As of 31 December 2004, it had a population of 1,077 and an area of 48.3 square kilometres (18.6 mi^{2}).

The municipality of Campodolcino contains the frazioni (subdivisions, mainly villages and hamlets) Fraciscio, Motta (the site of the Shrine of Our Lady of Europe), Strarleggia and Tini.

Campodolcino borders the following municipalities: Madesimo, Mesocco (Switzerland), Piuro, San Giacomo Filippo.

== Demographic evolution ==
Historical population

Year	Pop.	±%
1861	1,616	—
1871	1,635	+1.2%
1881	1,763	+7.8%
1901	1,512	−14.2%
1911	1,724	+14.0%

Year	Pop.	±%
1921	1,713	−0.6%
1931	1,751	+2.2%
1936	1,675	−4.3%
1951	1,673	−0.1%
1961	1,737	+3.8%

Year	Pop.	±%
1971	1,569	−9.7%
1981	1,224	−22.0%
1991	1,108	−9.5%
2001	1,086	−2.0%
2011	1,037	−4.5%

Source: Data from ISTAT
