= Livo =

Livo may refer to:

== Places ==
Italy

- Livo, Lombardy, a comune in the Province of Como
  - The Livo, a river in that comune
- Livo, Trentino, a comune in the Province of Trento

== Animal breeds ==
- The Lariana or Capra di Livo, a breed of domestic goat from the Province of Como
- The Livo, a sheep breed from the Val di Livo

== See also ==
- Livø
