= Liro =

Liro may refer to:

- Liro, Benin
- Liro (Como), a stream in the Province of Como, Lombardy, Italy
- Liro (Sondrio), a stream in the Province of Sondrio, Lombardy, Italy
- Liro Bank, (formerly Lippmann Rosenthal Bank) a bank in the Netherlands under German occupation
