= Liro (Como) =

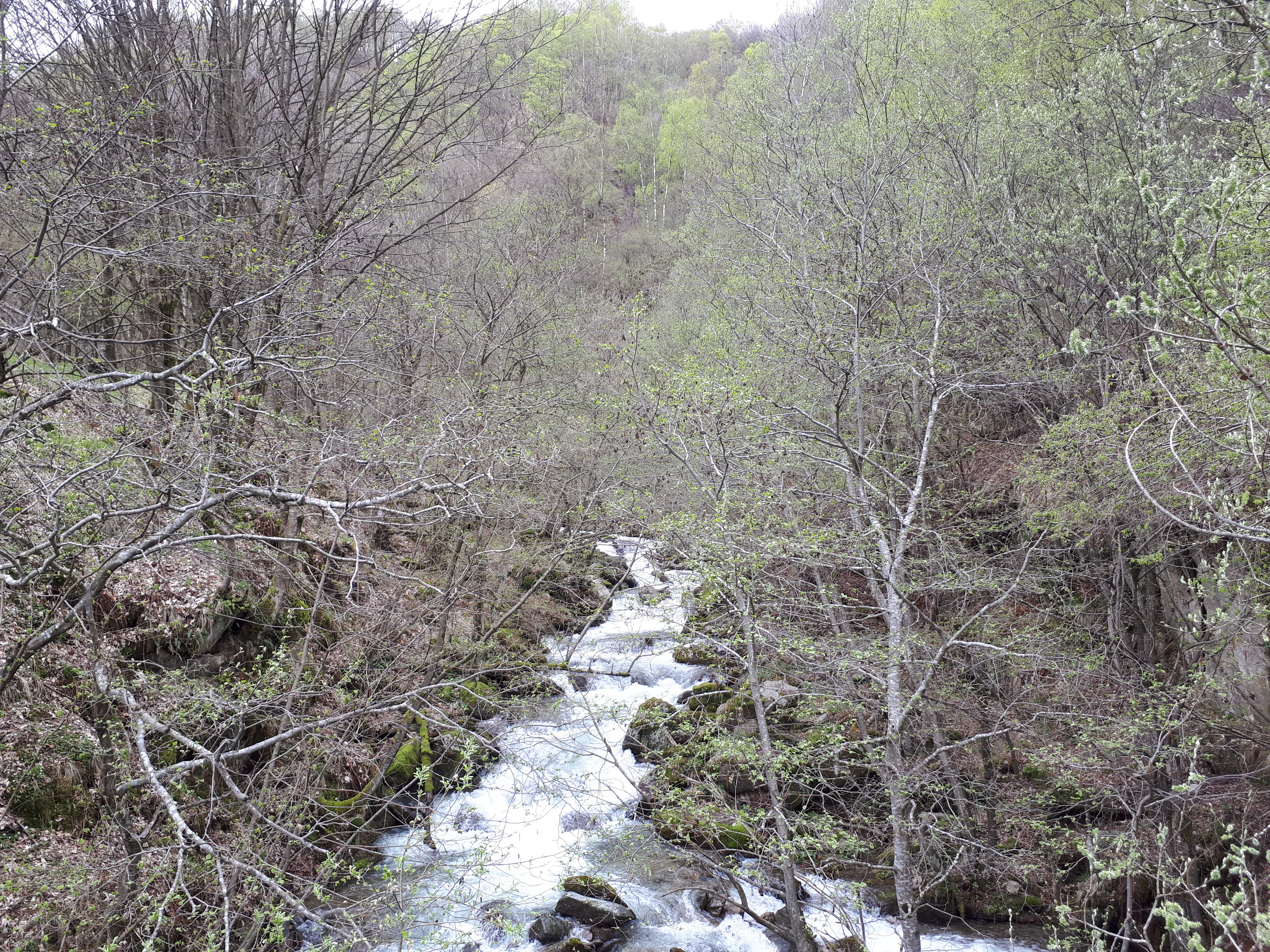

Location
- Country: Italy

Physical characteristics
- Source
  - location: Monte Marmontana
- Mouth
  - location: Lake Como at Gravedona
  - coordinates: 46.1368°N 9.3040°E
- Length: 14.2 km (8.8 mi)
- Basin size: 57.5 km^{2} (22.2 sq mi)

Basin features
- Progression: Lake Como→ Adda→ Po→ Adriatic Sea

The Liro is a torrente, or stream, in the north Italian Province of Como. The drainage basin is triangular in shape; its principal source lies on Monte Marmontana near the Swiss border and flows through the Valle San Iorio (also Jorio). The second source lies to the northeast on the slopes of Pizzo Martello and forms the Valle del Dosso. Near Dosso del Liro the stream receives the waters of the torrente Ronzone, which flows from Monte Duria through the Val d’Inferno. The Liro enters Lake Como at Gravedona.

== See also ==
- Another torrente named the Liro, in the Valle Spluga
