= Livo sheep =

Breed of sheep

Livo
- Conservation status: FAO (2007): extinct
- Country of origin: Italy
- Distribution: province of Como
- Use: meat

Traits
- Weight: Male: 70 kg; Female: 50–55 kg
- Height: Male: 70–75 cm; Female: 65–70 cm
- Wool color: straw-coloured
- Face color: pale
- Horn status: hornless in both sexes

The Livo is a rare Italian breed of domestic sheep. It takes its name from the Val di Livo, in the province of Como, in Lombardy in northern Italy. Most of the data on the breed dates to 1983. Its conservation status is not clear; it may be extinct.

== History ==
The origins of the Livo are unknown. It originates in the Val di Livo, in the province of Como, in Lombardy in northern Italy, and is named for the Livo river or for the comune of Livo. It shows similarity to the Ciavenasca breed of the Valchiavenna, in the province of Sondrio further to the north. It may have been influenced by Merinolandschaf (Württemberger) stock imported to the southern part of the area of Lake Como in the 1950s, and possibly also by lop-eared Alpine breeds such as the Bergamasca and the Brianzola.

Data on the breed dates to 1983, when there were approximately 500 head. The Livo was, but is no longer, among the autochthonous local sheep breeds of limited distribution officially recognised by the Ministero delle Politiche Agricole Alimentari e Forestali, the Italian ministry of agriculture. A herd-book is kept by the Associazione Nazionale della Pastorizia, the Italian national association of sheep-breeders; it has been empty for many years. In 2007 the Livo was classified by the FAO as "extinct".

== Characteristics ==
The Livo is well adapted to its mountain environment, where pastures may be very steep. The coat is straw-coloured, and extends onto the forehead and the upper part of the legs. The breed has a low twinning rate, about 20–25%.

== Use ==
The Livo is kept mainly for meat production; lambs are slaughtered at a weight of 10–12 kg. The milk is just sufficient for the lambs. Wool yield is some 2–2.5 kg per year; it is of mediocre quality.
