= Dongo, Lombardy =

Dongo Dongh (Lombard)
- Comune
- Comune di Dongo
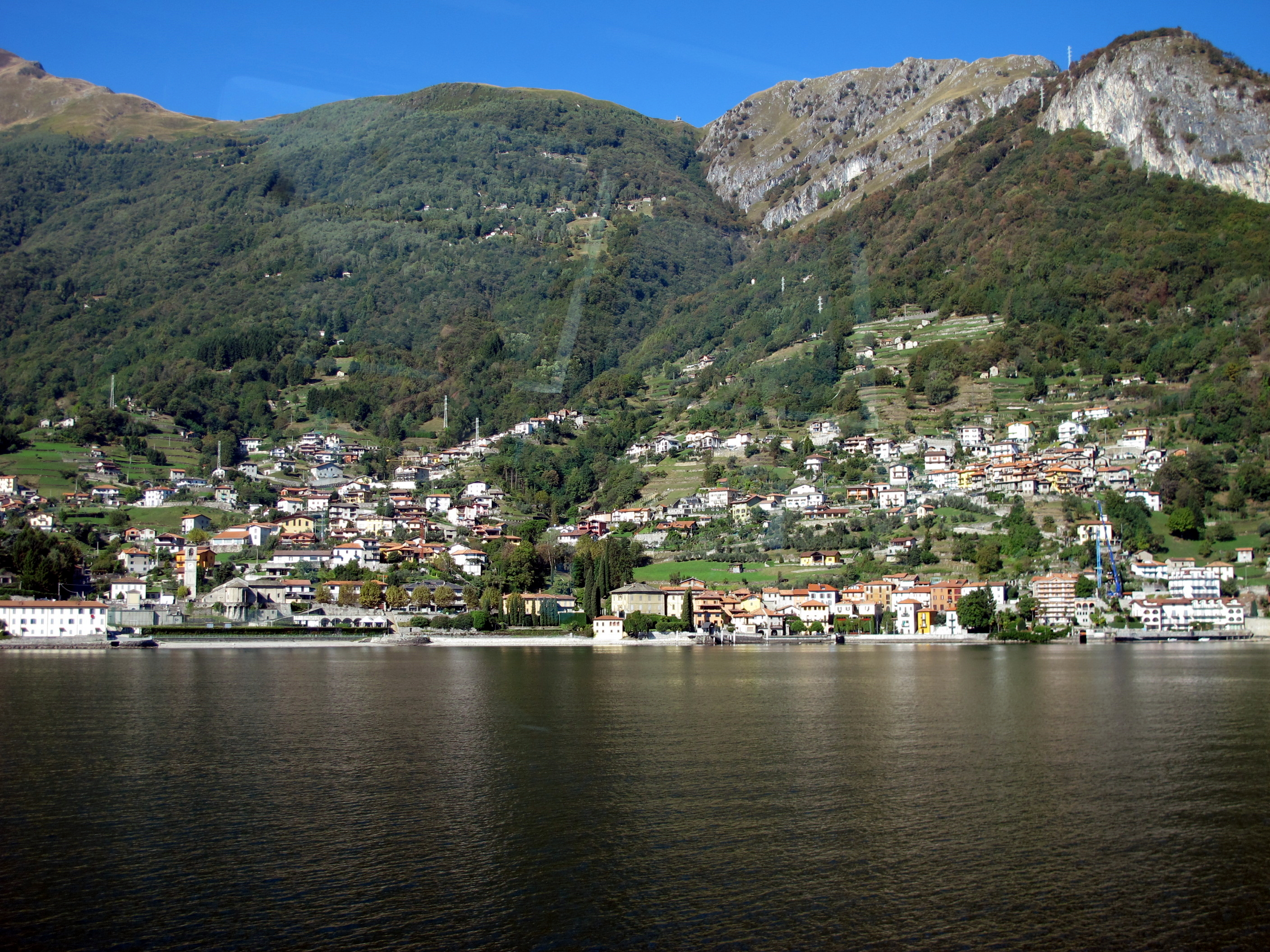

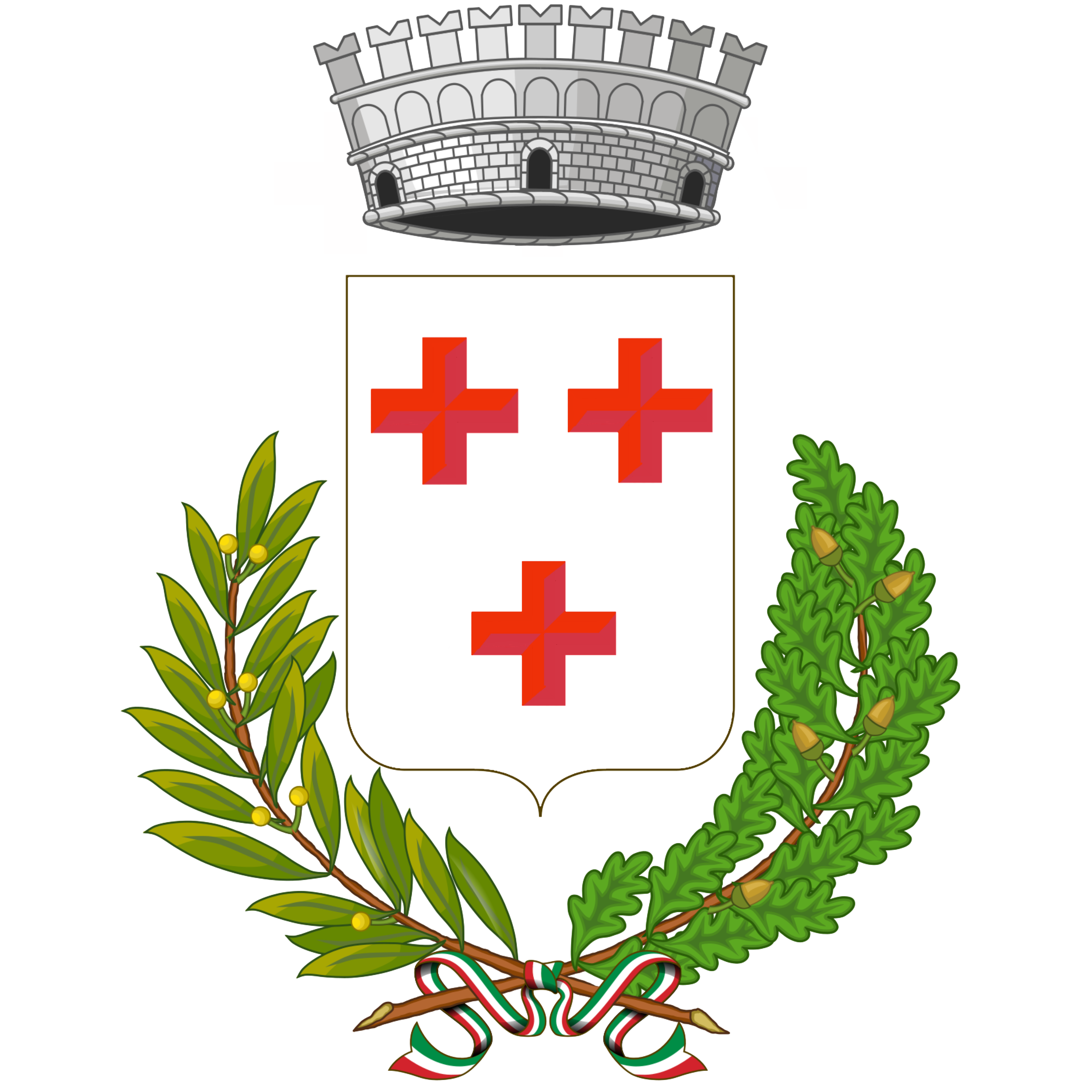
- Coat of arms

- Location within Italy Location within Lombardy
- Coordinates: 46°8′N 9°17′E
- Country: Italy
- Region: Lombardy
- Province: Como (CO)

Government
  - Mayor: Giovanni Muolo

Area
  - Total: 7.5 km^{2} (2.9 sq mi)
- Elevation: 208 m (682 ft)

Population (1-1-2017)
  - Total: 3,407
  - Density: 450/km^{2} (1,200/sq mi)
- Demonym: Donghese(i)
- Time zone: UTC+1 (CET)
  - Summer (DST): UTC+2 (CEST)
- Postal code: 22014
- Dialing code: 0344
- Patron saint: Saint Gothard
- Saint day: 5 May
- Website: Official website

Dongo (Comasco: Dongh [ˈdũːk]) is a comune in the Province of Como in the Italian region of Lombardy. It lies on the northwestern shore of Lake Como between Gravedona and Musso at the mouth of the Albano. It is 70 kilometres (43 mi) north of Milan and about 40 kilometres (25 mi) northeast of Como.

It was in Dongo, on 27 April 1945, that Benito Mussolini and other fascists, fleeing from Milan towards Valtellina, were captured by Urbano Lazzaro and other partisans.

Dongo borders Colico, Consiglio di Rumo, Garzeno, Germasino, Musso, Pianello del Lario, and Stazzona.

== Main sights ==
=== Palazzo del Vescovo ===
The Palazzo del Vescovo (Palace of the Bishop) was erected in the 17th century by the family of the Marquis Cossoni. In 1854, Carlo Romanò, the Bishop of Como, acquired the building from the Cossoni family.

In 1983, the Town of Dongo purchased the building. The citizens of Dongo, assisted financially by the Comunità Montana Alto Lario Occidentale, initiated the complete restoration of the Palazzo shortly thereafter.

Still bearing its original name, the building currently houses the Civic Institute of Music "Alto Lario", and, since December 2003, the International Piano Academy Lake Como.

=== Palazzo Manzi ===
The Palazzo Manzi, facing across the main square on the lake front, now serves as the Municipio (centre of civic administration) for the comune. Its ground floor houses the Museo della Fine della Guerra (Museum of the end of the war), reopened after refurbishment in April 2014 and formerly known as the Museo della Resistenza (Museum of the resistance). The museum provides audio and visual displays relating to the partisan movement in Dongo and the north Como area from the time of the Italian armistice in September 1943 up to the end of the war, and more specifically to the capture of Mussolini and other fascist leaders at Dongo in April 1945, and their subsequent execution.

== Twin towns ==
Dongo is twinned with Arromanches-les-Bains in Normandy.

== See also ==
- Dongo Treasure
