= Dongo Treasure =

Italian Fascist expropriations found during Mussolini's capture

The Dongo Treasure were the valuables in Italian dictator Benito Mussolini's possession at the time of his capture and execution.

== Treasure ==
During the dissolution of the Mussolini administration, valuables disappeared or were distributed. The finance minister distributed 200 million lire of state funds among government ministers who fled Italy along with their belongings.

At the time of Benito Mussolini's capture, on April 27, 1945, the Italian resistance fighter Urbano Lazzaro seized two cases of valuables and documents. Mussolini's case included 1,150,000 lire and 160 British sovereigns. Lazzaro brought the two cases to a bank in the village of Domaso, north of Dongo.

Additionally, Mussolini's German escorts had discarded three bags of valuables in a river. These contained gold jewelry that Italian citizens had donated to the Fascists during the 1935 Oro alla Patria fundraising campaign for Mussolini's Second Italo-Ethiopian War. Two fishermen recovered the sacks.

Partisans stopped two Germans in an expensive Fiat automobile found to carry 33 million lire. The Germans attempted to bribe a Swiss national to send the money to their mistresses, but the individual instead brought the money to Lazzaro, who deposited it in the Domaso bank.

In 1949, Life magazine estimated the Dongo Treasure at US$66,259,590 (equivalent to $896,589,557 in 2025).

== See also ==
- Robbing Mussolini

== Bibliography ==
- Moseley, Ray (2004). "Lakeside Murders and the Dongo Treasure". Mussolini: The Last 600 Days of Il Duce. Taylor Trade Publications. pp. 333–. ISBN 978-1-58979-095-7.
- Palmieri, Edmund L.; Kobler, John (January 17, 1949). "What Happened to Mussolini's Millions". Life. Vol. 26, no. 3. pp. 78–93.
