= Mallero =

River in Italy

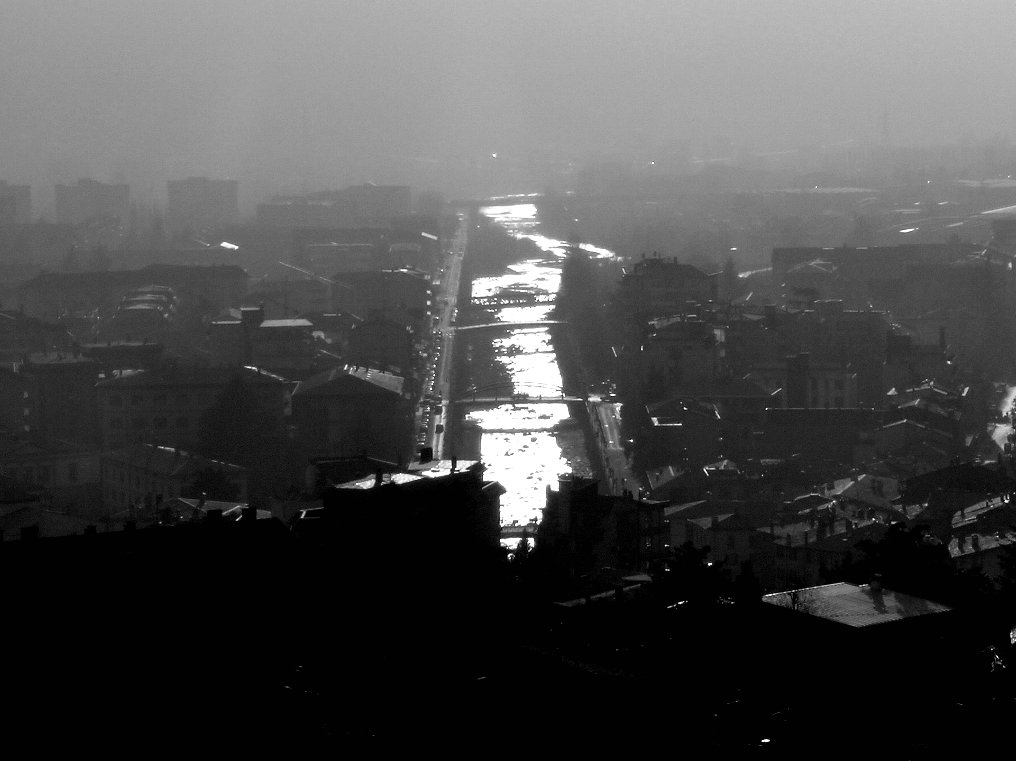

Location
- Countries: Italy

Physical characteristics
- Source: Monte del Forno
  - location: north of Sondrio, Italy
  - coordinates: 46.3416256°N 9.731859°E
  - elevation: 2,750 m (9,020 ft)
- Mouth: Adda
  - location: Sondrio
  - coordinates: 46.1610982°N 9.8497101°E
- Length: 30.3 km (18.8 mi)

Basin features
- Progression: Adda→ Po→ Adriatic Sea

Mallero is a river in the Province of Sondrio.

== Course ==
Its source is near the Monte del Forno, it flows south through the Valmalenco and joins the Adda after crossing Sondrio. Towns along the river include Chiesa in Valmalenco, Torre di Santa Maria and Spriana.

=== Tributaries ===
Antognasco, Lanterna, Torreggio, Entovasco, Nevasco, Forasco, Pirola, Braciasco, Giumellini, Arcoglio, Dagua, Valdone.

== See also ==
- Valtellina disaster
