= Liro (Sondrio) =

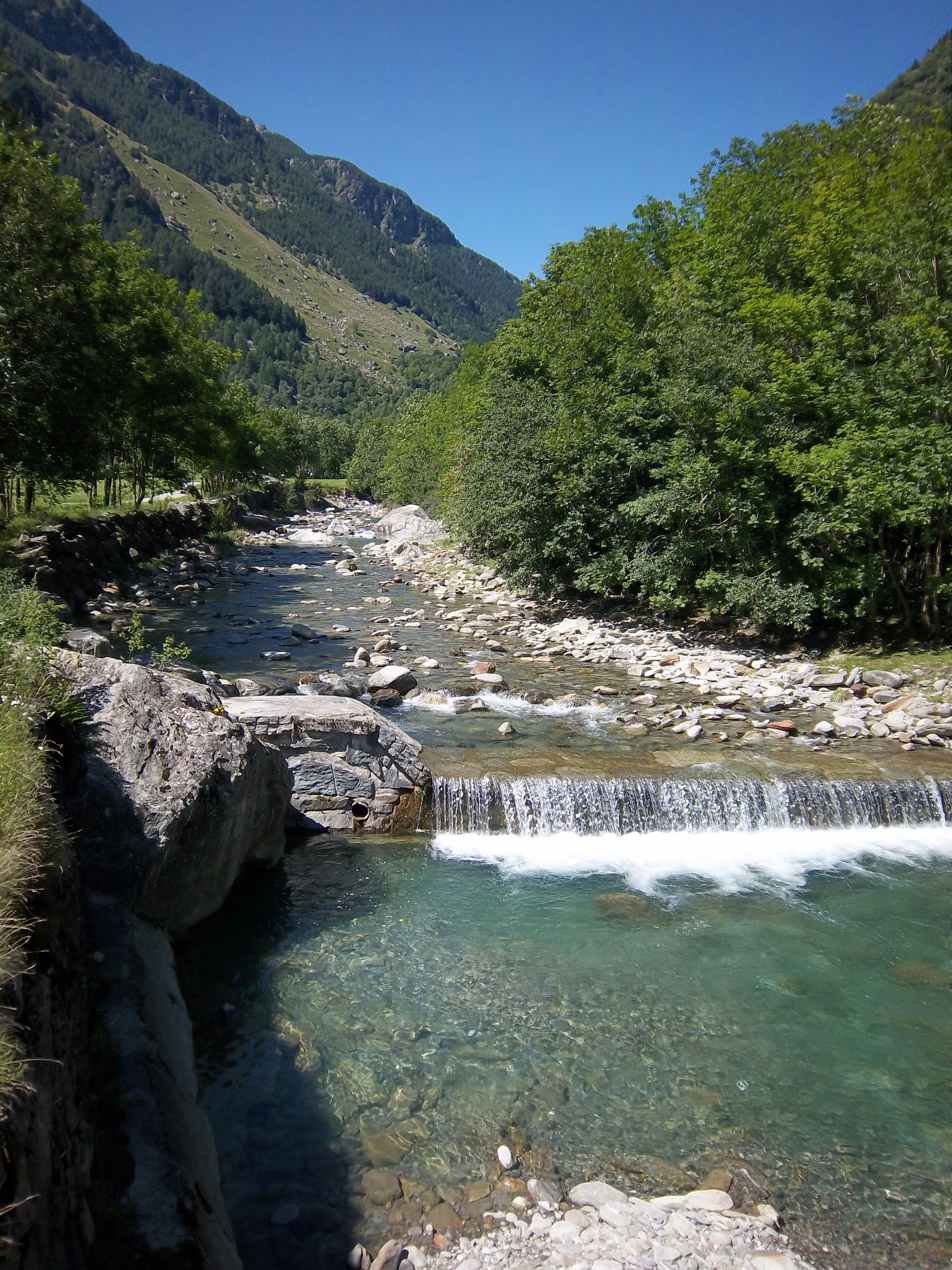

Location
- Country: Italy

Physical characteristics
- Mouth: Mera
  - coordinates: 46.3078°N 9.3913°E
- Length: 14km

Basin features
- Progression: Mera→ Lake Como→ Adda→ Po→ Adriatic Sea
- Tributaries
  - right: torrente dei Boo e torrente dello zio

The Liro is an Alpine torrente of the north Italian Province of Sondrio which rises near the Splügen Pass and the boundary with Switzerland. It runs the length of the Valle Spluga (or Val San Giacomo) before joining the Mera from the right at Prata Camportaccio, a little southwest of Chiavenna. At the upper part of its course by Montespluga it forms a small reservoir, the Lago di Montespluga, elevation 1,901 metres (6,237 ft). It forms a second, and still smaller, lake at Isola.

== See also ==
- The torrente named the Liro, which runs through the Valle San Iorio and enters Lake Como at Gravedona.
