= Albano (river) =

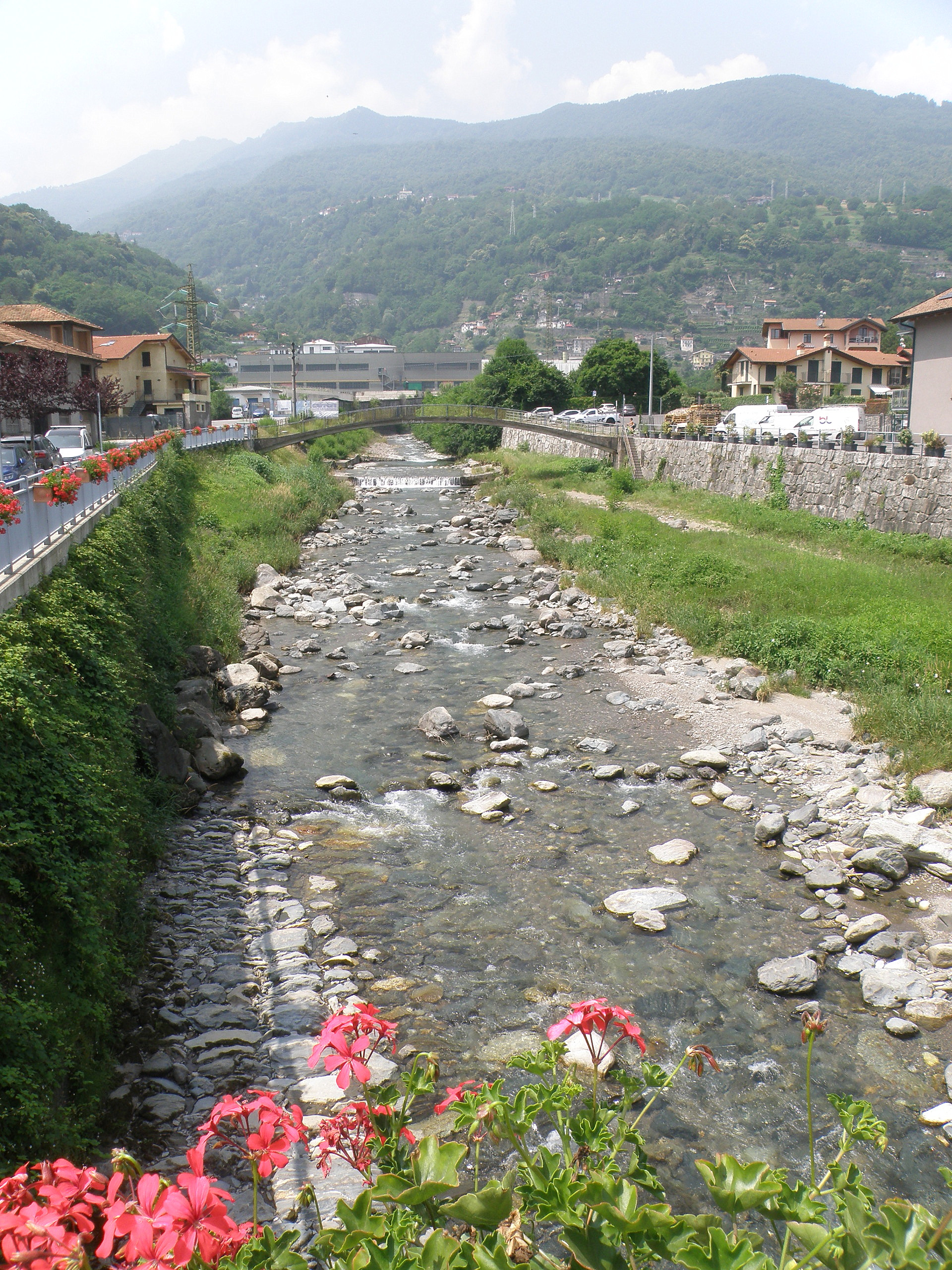
- River Albano in Dongo

Location
- Country: Italy

Physical characteristics
- Source
  - location: Bocchetta di Sommafiume
  - elevation: 1,750 m (5,740 ft)
- Mouth
  - location: Lake Como, at Dongo
  - coordinates: 46.1240°N 9.2864°E
  - elevation: 199 m (653 ft)

Basin features
- Progression: Lake Como

The Albano is a stream (or torrente) of Lombardy, Italy which flows through the province of Como. It rises from the Bocchetta di Sommafiume, in the commune of Germasino and runs eastwards through the Albano valley entering Lake Como at Dongo. Between the communes of Germasino and Dongo Albano passes through Garzeno.

The most common fish are brown trout (both Salmo trutta morpha fario and S. trutta morpha lacustris), rainbow trout, and chub. The fauna supported by the stream also includes amphibians such as the fire salamander, and insects such as stream mayflies.
