= Acquafraggia =

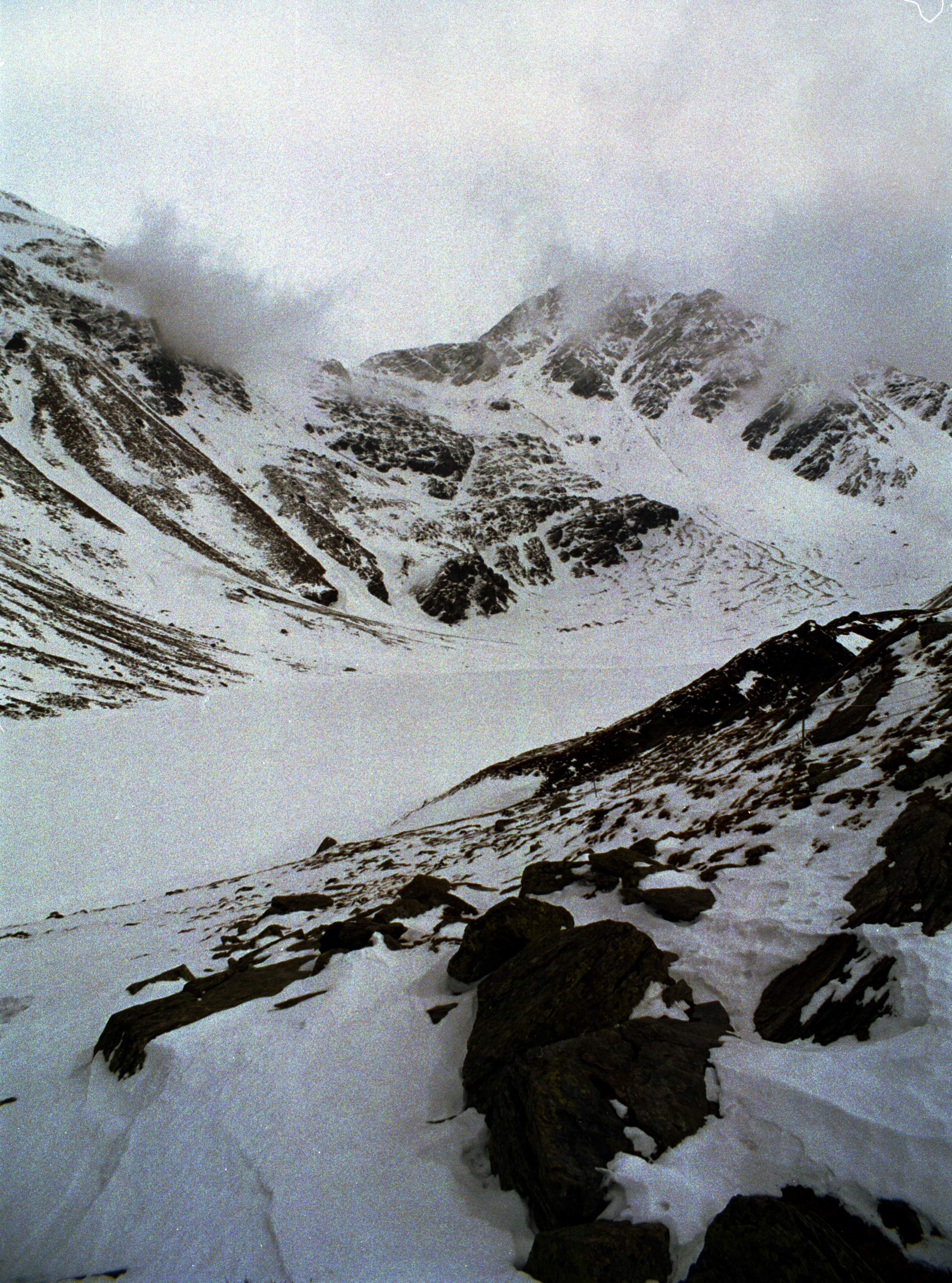
- The lake of Acquafraggia frozen over in March 2007

Location
- Country: Italy

Physical characteristics
- Source
  - location: Pizzo di Lago
  - elevation: 3,050 m (10,010 ft)
- Mouth: Mera
  - location: Borgonuovo, Piuro
  - coordinates: 46.3253°N 9.4316°E

Basin features
- Progression: Mera→

Acquafraggia (also Acqua Fraggia) is a short and frequently steep torrente, or seasonal stream, of the province of Sondrio in Lombardy, north Italy.

Its source is on Pizzo del Lago, at an elevation of 3,050 metres (10,010 ft), on the north side of the Val Bregaglia and close to the Swiss border which here marks the limit of the Po drainage basin. From here it flows in a southwesterly direction within the territory of the commune of Piuro until it joins the Mera as a right tributary at the locality of Borgonuovo, a little upstream from Chiavenna and the mouth of the Val Bregaglia.

At an early point of its course the stream forms the lake of Acqua Fraggia at an elevation of 2,043 metres (6,703 ft); it then runs through two hanging valleys of glacial origins, emerging from each in a series of waterfalls, which were noted by Leonardo da Vinci in the Codex Atlanticus. This has been a protected area since 1983.

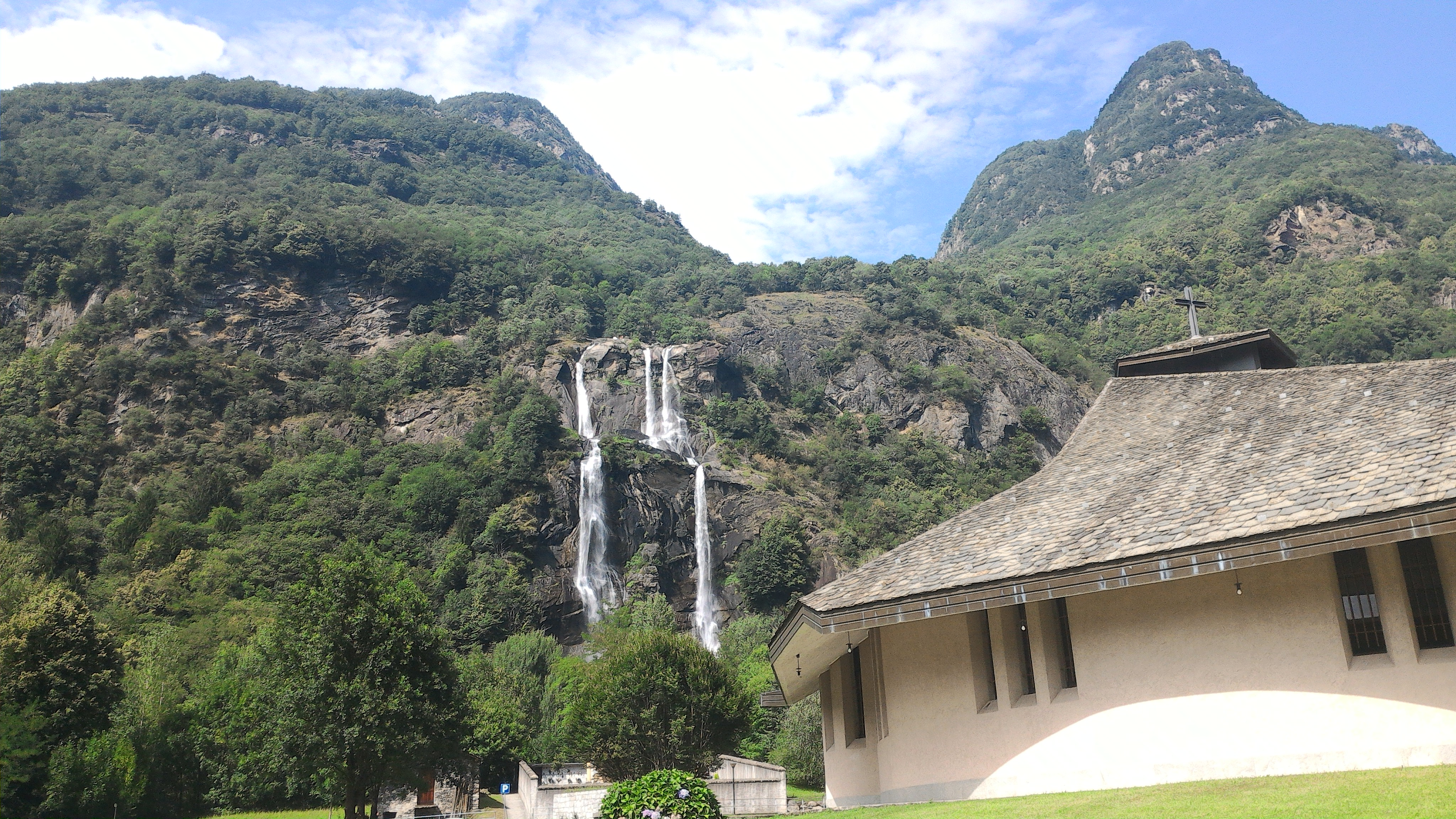
Waterfall called Cascade Acquafraggia. From 2015-07. With surrounding

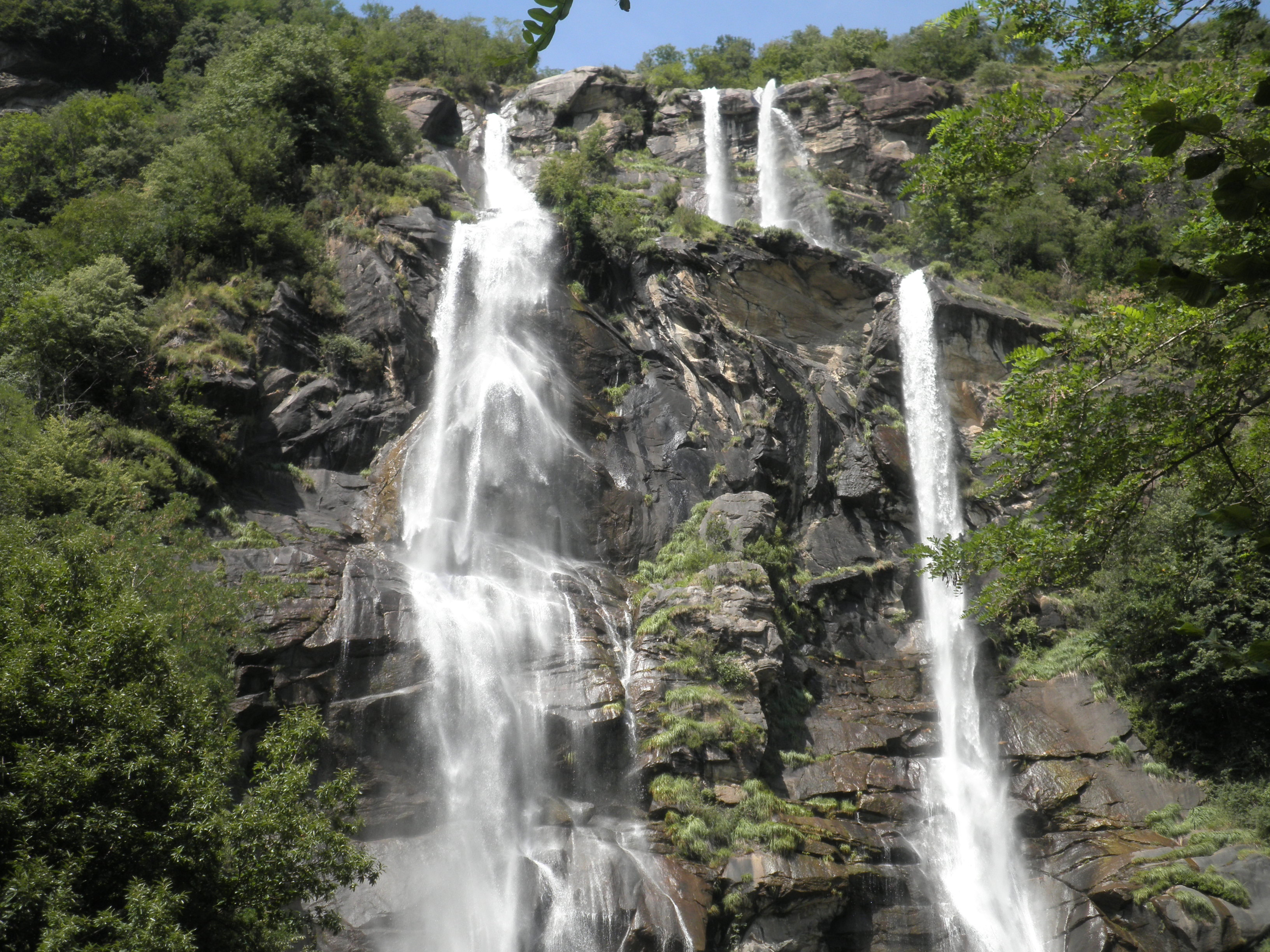
Waterfall called Cascade Acquafraggia. From 2015-07. Closeup

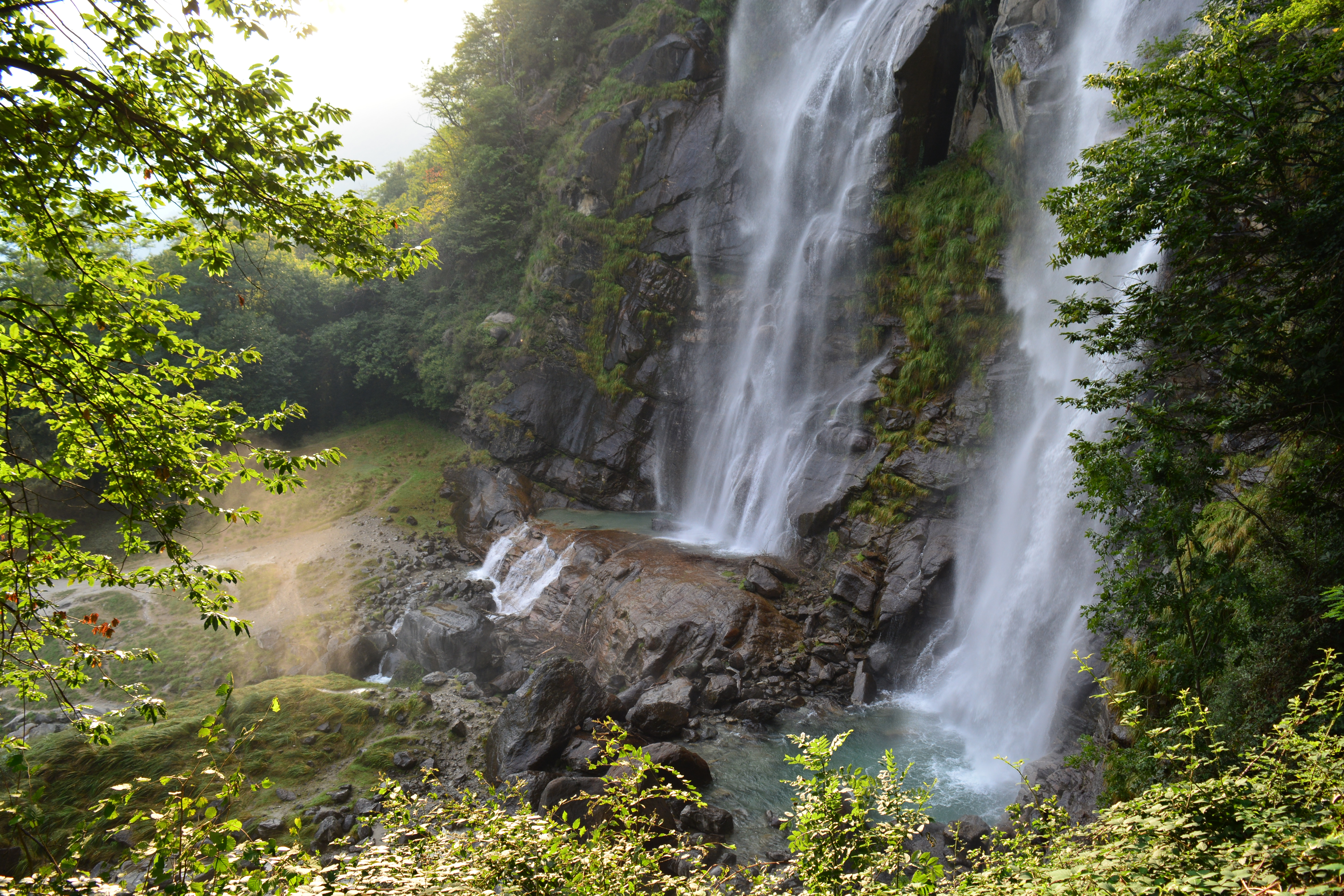
Acquafraggia waterfall view from the top
