= Mera (Lake Como) =

River in Switzerland and Italy

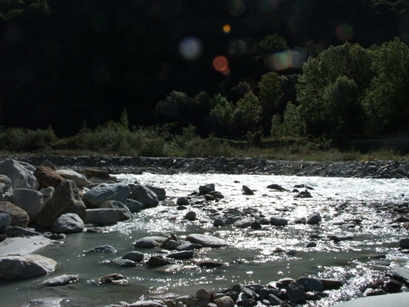
- The Mera above Villa di Chiavenna

Location
- Country: Switzerland; Italy

Physical characteristics
- Source
  - location: Mungiroi, Grisons, Switzerland
  - coordinates: 46.3944°N 9.5728°E
  - elevation: 2,849 m (9,347 ft)
- Mouth
  - location: Lake Como at Gera Lario
  - coordinates: 46.1668°N 9.3751°E
  - elevation: 197 m (646 ft)
- Length: 50 km (31 mi)

Basin features
- Progression: Lake Como→ Adda→ Po→ Adriatic Sea
- Tributaries
  - right: Acquafraggia, Liro

The Mera (Lombard: Maira) is a river in Switzerland and Italy. Its source is near the Piz Mungiroi, in the Grisons, Switzerland. First, it flows east in the direction of Maloja Pass, then turns west through the Val Bregaglia (German: Bergell) and crosses the border to Italy in Castasegna (Dogana). It is joined by the Acquafraggia close to Piuro, and then turns south at Chiavenna, just before it receives the river Liro from the right at Prata Camportaccio. The Mera ends in Lake Como, near Sorico in the Province of Como.
