= Dosso del Liro =

- Comune
- Comune di Dosso del Liro
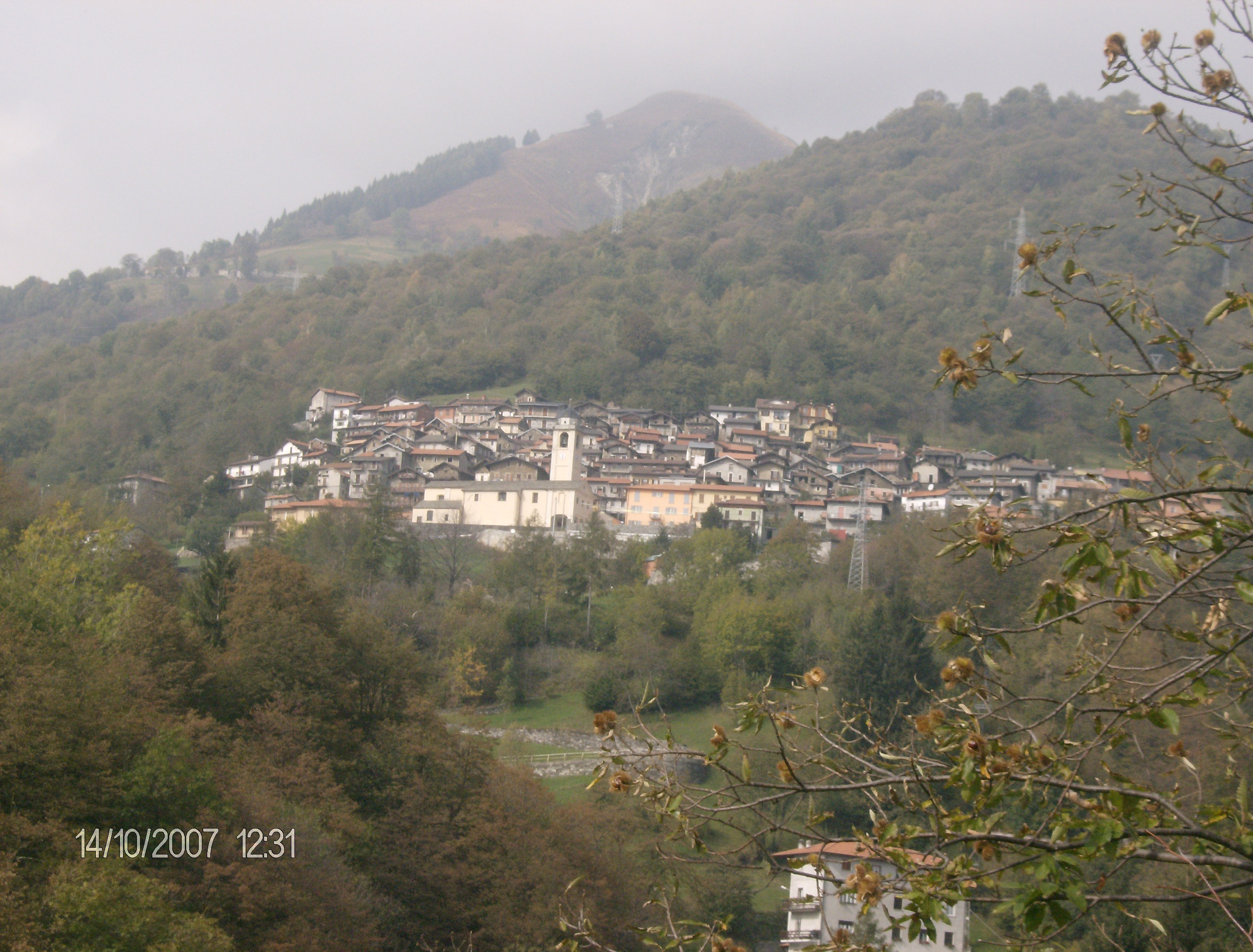

- Location within Italy Location within Lombardy
- Coordinates: 46°10′N 9°16′E
- Country: Italy
- Region: Lombardy
- Province: Province of Como (CO)

Area
  - Total: 23.2 km^{2} (9.0 sq mi)

Population (Dec. 2004)
  - Total: 297
  - Density: 12.8/km^{2} (33.2/sq mi)
- Time zone: UTC+1 (CET)
  - Summer (DST): UTC+2 (CEST)
- Postal code: 22015
- Dialing code: 0344

Dosso del Liro (Comasco: Dòss [ˈdɔs]) is a comune (municipality) in the Province of Como in the Italian region Lombardy, located about 80 kilometres (50 mi) north of Milan and about 40 kilometres (25 mi) northeast of Como, on the border with Switzerland. As of 31 December 2004, it had a population of 297 and an area of 23.2 km^{2} (9.0 sq mi).

Dosso del Liro borders the following municipalities: Cama (Switzerland), Consiglio di Rumo, Gravedona, Grono (Switzerland), Livo, Peglio, Roveredo (Switzerland).

== Demographic evolution ==
Historical population

Year	Pop.	±%
1861	702	—
1871	746	+6.3%
1881	730	−2.1%
1901	715	−2.1%
1911	789	+10.3%

Year	Pop.	±%
1921	709	−10.1%
1931	641	−9.6%
1936	650	+1.4%
1951	579	−10.9%
1961	499	−13.8%

Year	Pop.	±%
1971	453	−9.2%
1981	395	−12.8%
1991	354	−10.4%
2001	315	−11.0%

Source: Data from ISTAT
