= Adda (river) =

Tributary of the Po in Italy

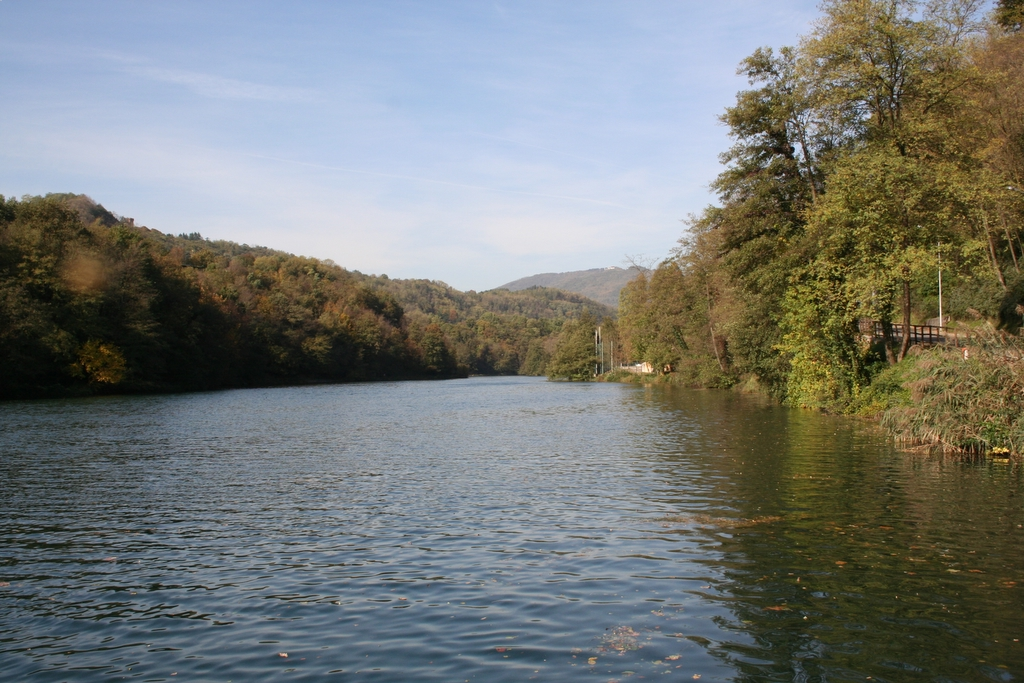
- The Adda in Imbersago

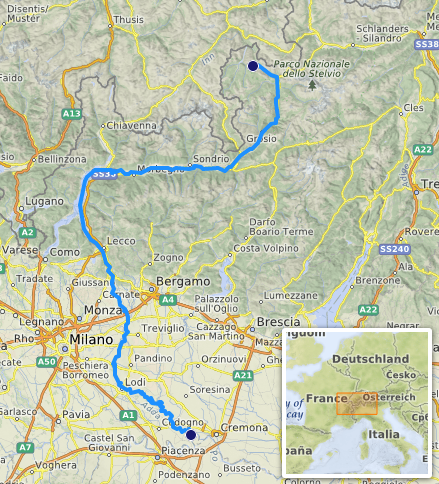
- Location of the Adda

Location
- Countries: Italy, Switzerland

Physical characteristics
- Source: Val Alpisella
  - location: east of Livigno, Italy
  - coordinates: 46°32′50.64″N 10°14′21.12″E
  - elevation: 2,122 m (6,962 ft)
- Mouth: Po
  - location: near Castelnuovo Bocca d'Adda
  - coordinates: 45°06′38″N 9°53′12″E
- Length: 313 km (194 mi)
- Basin size: 7,979 km^{2} (3,081 mi^{2})
- Discharge
  - average: 187 m^{3}/s (6,600 cu ft/s)

Basin features
- Tributaries
  - left: Brembo, Serio
  - right: Mallero, Mera

The Adda (Latin: Abdua, or Addua; Lombard: Ada, or Adda) is a river in North Italy, a tributary of the Po. It rises in the Alps near the border with Switzerland and flows through Lake Como. The Adda joins the Po near Castelnuovo Bocca d'Adda, a few kilometers upstream of Cremona. The river's length is 313 kilometres (194 mi). The highest point of the drainage basin is the summit of La Spedla (a subpeak of Piz Bernina), at 4,020 metres (13,190 ft).

Towns along the river include Bormio, Tirano, Sondrio, Bellagio and Lecco (both on Lake Como), Brivio and Lodi. The Poschiavino, a tributary, originates in Switzerland and flows through the town of Poschiavo.

== Course ==
The Adda's source is in the Alpisella valley near the head of the Fraele glen, within the Rhaetian Alps. Its flow is augmented by several smaller streams near Bormio. From there, it flows southwest, then west, through the Valtellina, passing Tirano, where the Poschiavino joins from the right, and Sondrio, where the Mallero joins, also from the right. This section of the Adda's course is unusual in Northern Italy, as it flows from east to west. The river flows into the northern end of Lake Como, contributing significantly to the lake's volume. Exiting the lake's southeastern (Lecco) arm, it crosses the Lombardy Plain. It receives water from the Brembo and Serio from the left, and ultimately joins the Po.

The Trezzo sull'Adda Bridge, constructed in 1377, had a single arch of 72 metres (236 ft), the longest bridge arch built before the introduction of metal in bridge construction.

The lower course of the Adda historically marked the border between the Republic of Venice and the Duchy of Milan, as established by the Treaty of Lodi in 1454. Several significant battles have been fought along its banks, including the Battle of Lodi in 1796, where Napoleon defeated Austrian forces. The bridgehead at Cassano d'Adda and its surrounding area have also been the site of multiple battles, including one in 1705 involving Prince Eugene of Savoy and the French, and another in 1799 where Alexander Suvorov led his forces across the river.

== Tributaries ==
The Adda has the following tributaries (R on the right bank, L on the left, from source to mouth):

- Frodolfo (L)
- Bormina (R)
- Roasco (R)
- Rezzalasco (L)
- Lenasco (L)
- Poschiavino (R)
- Mallero (R)
- Masino (R)
- Bitto (L)
- Tartano (L)
- Mera (Lake Como, R)
- Livo (Lake Como, R)
- Liro (Lake Como, R)
- Albano (Lake Como, R)
- Pioverna (Lake Como, L)
- Breggia (Lake Como, R)
- Cosia (Lake Como, R)
- Fiumelatte (Lake Como, L)
- Brembo (L)
- Serio (L)

== Gallery ==
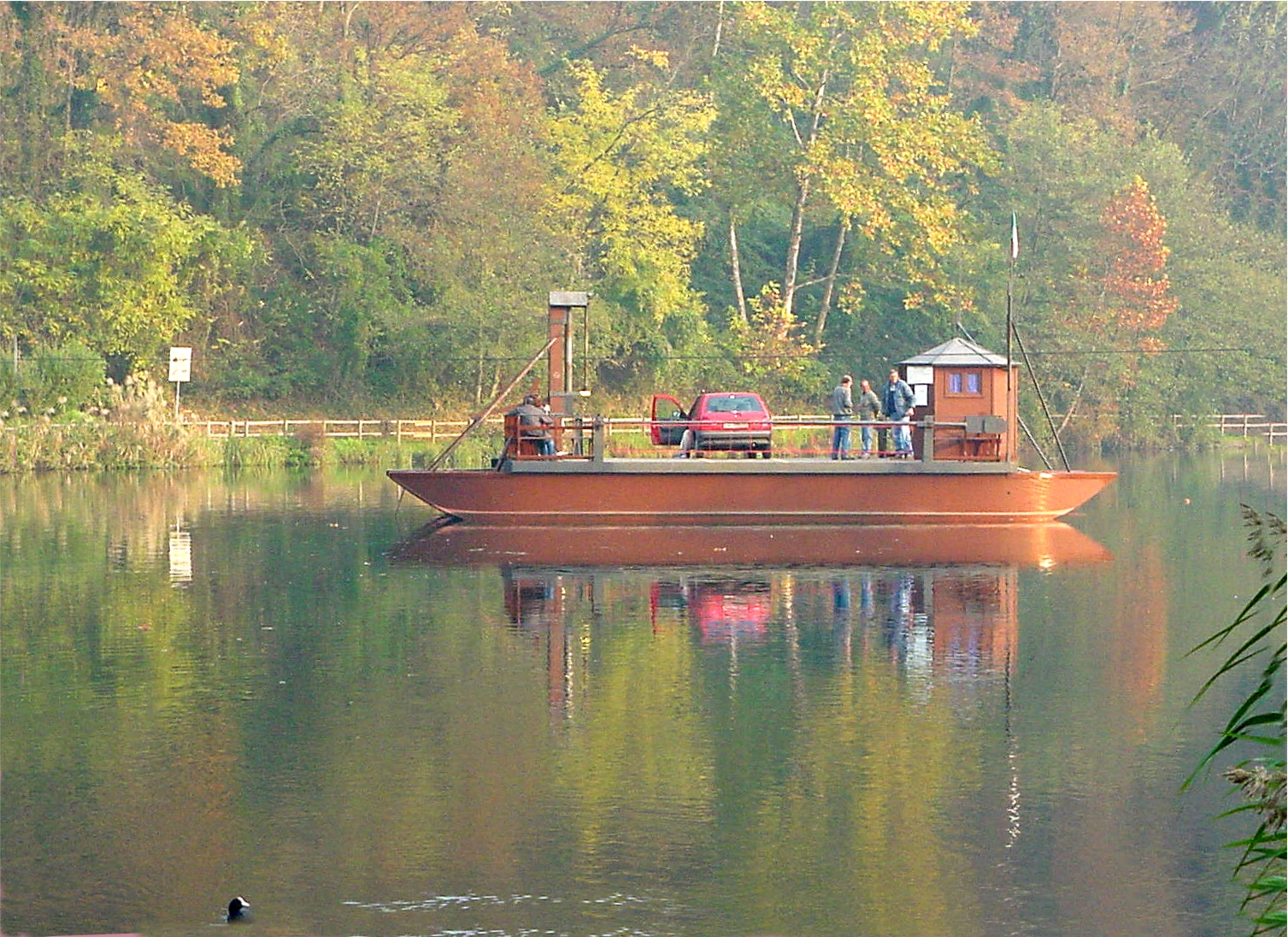
Ferry, attributed to Leonardo da Vinci

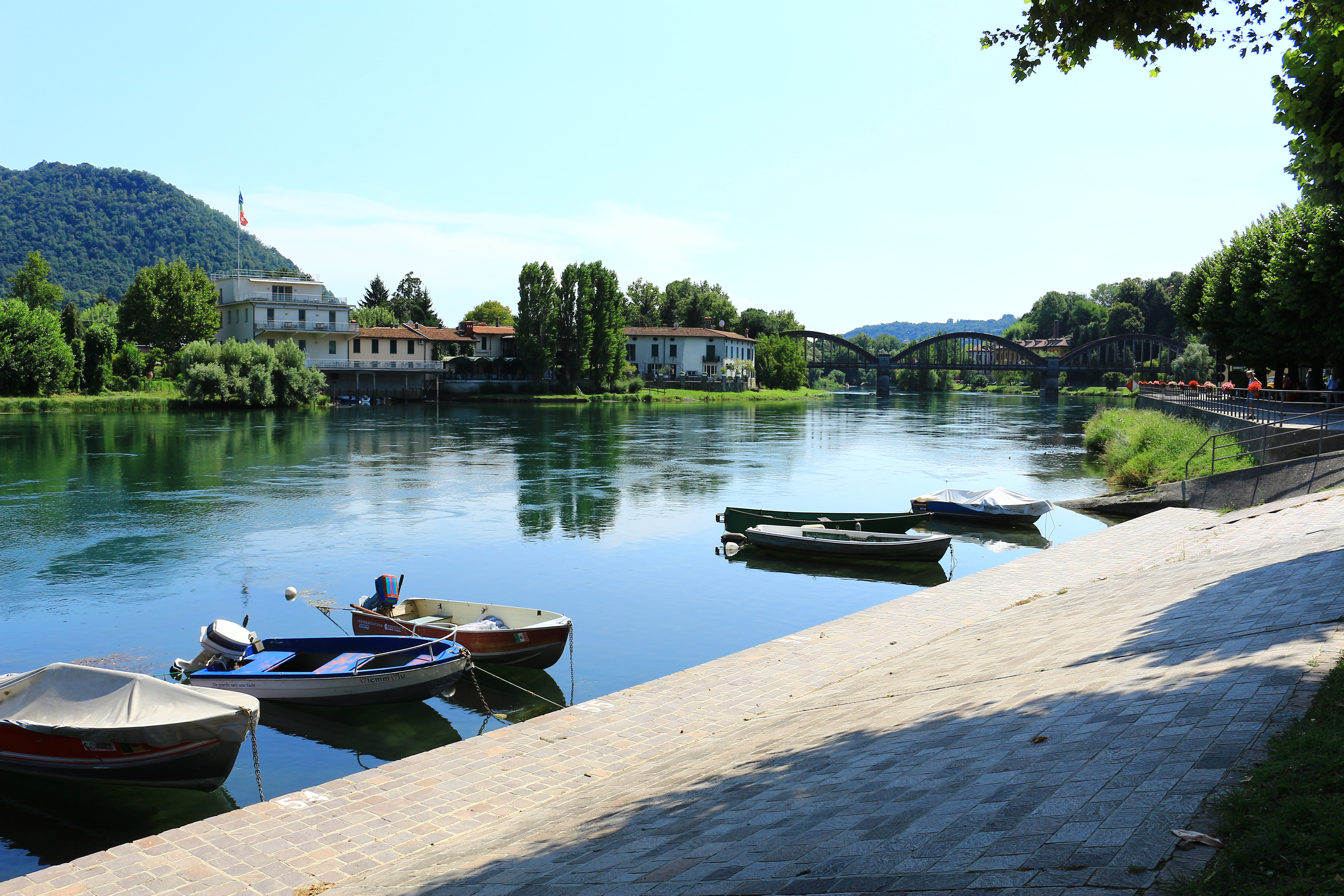
The Adda river in Brivio

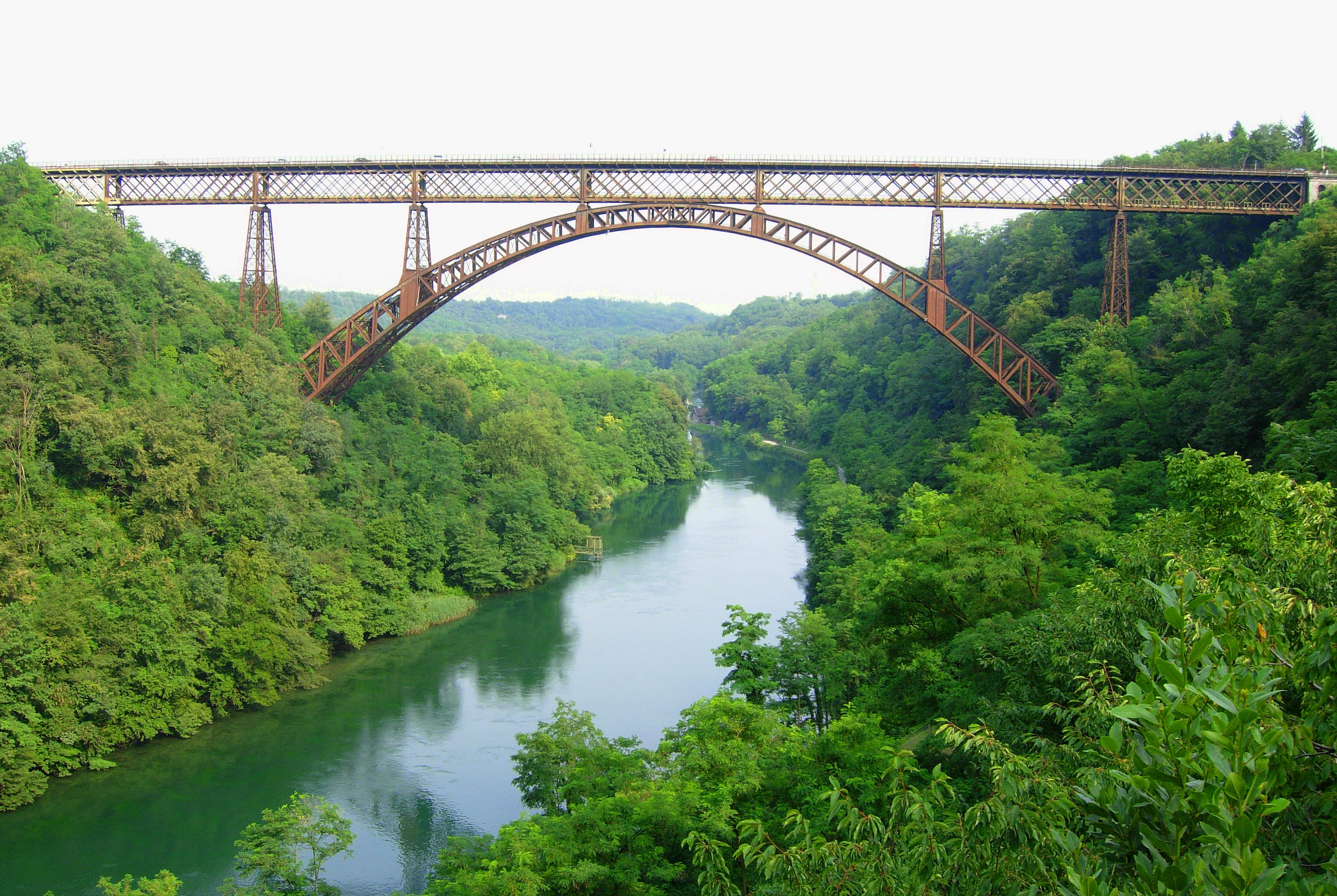
San Michele Bridge across the Adda at Paderno

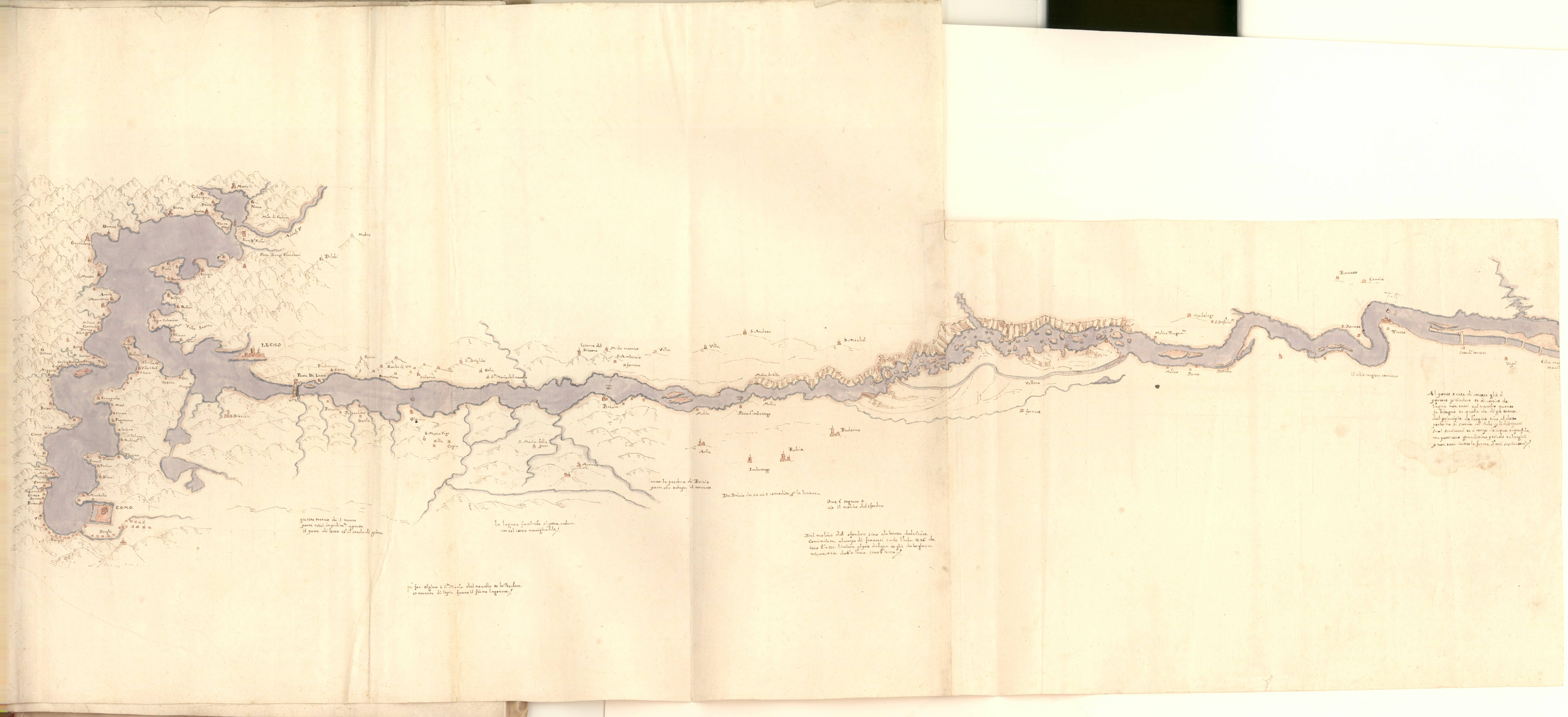
17th century map of the Adda, from Lake Como to Trezzo

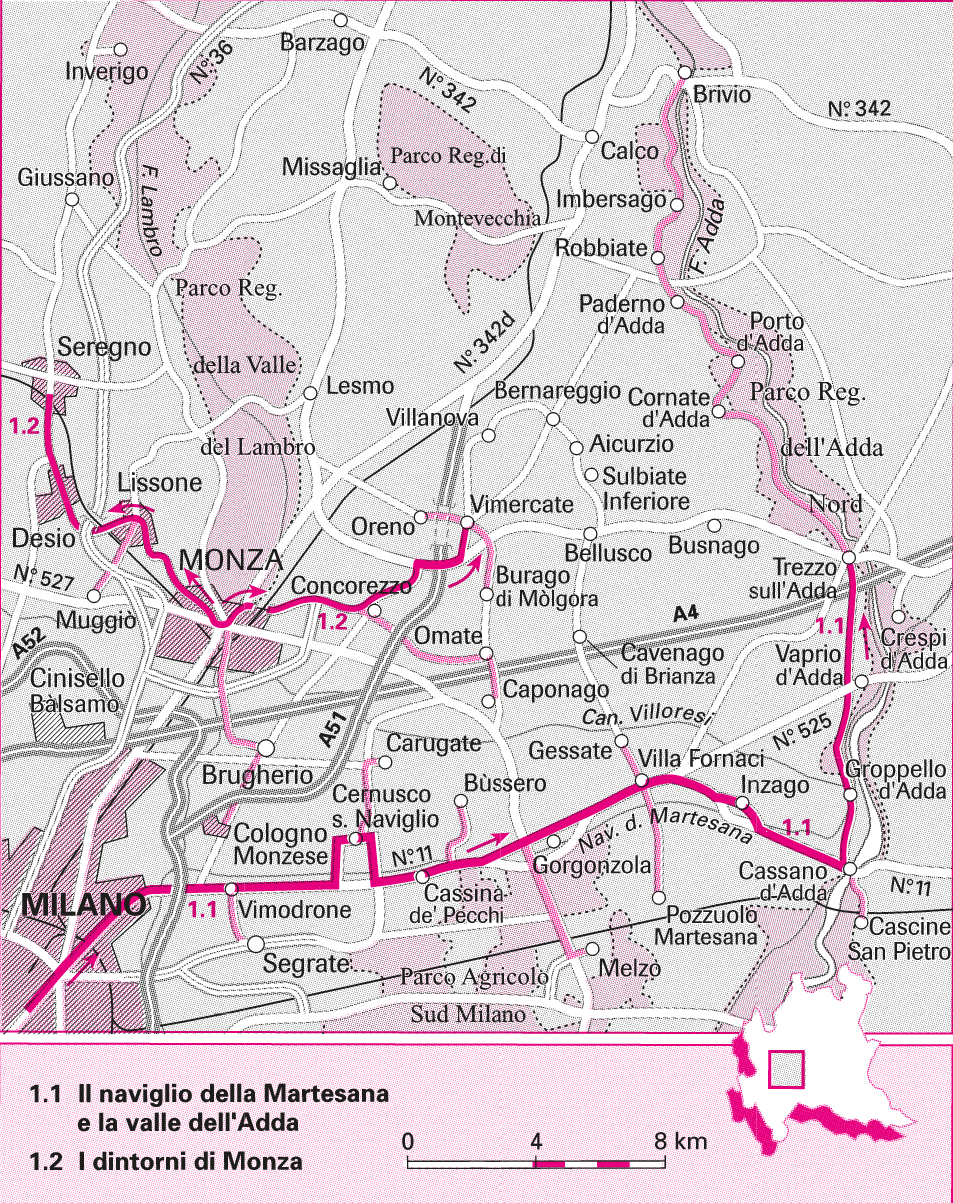
Map of Adda valley and naviglio Martesana

== See also ==
- Val Pola landslide
- Battle of the Adda River (490 CE)
