= Oro alla Patria =

1935 Italian Fascist campaign

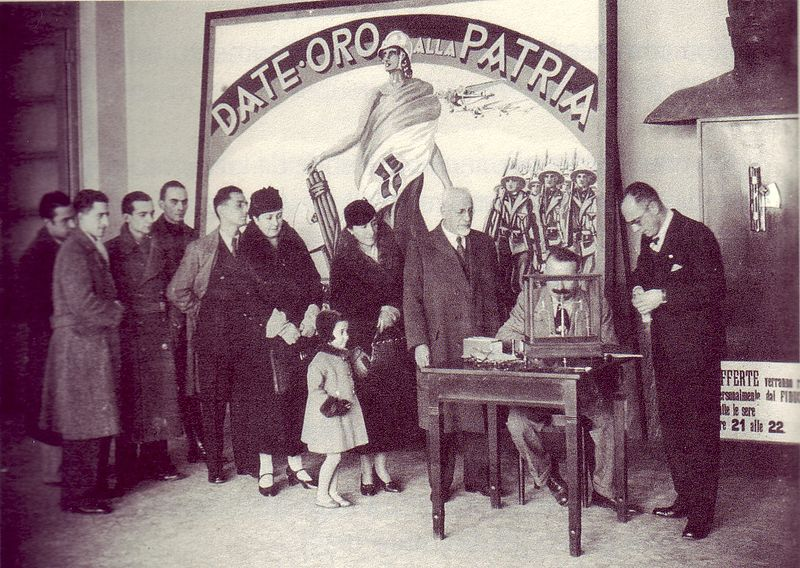
Milan, collection of gold wedding rings

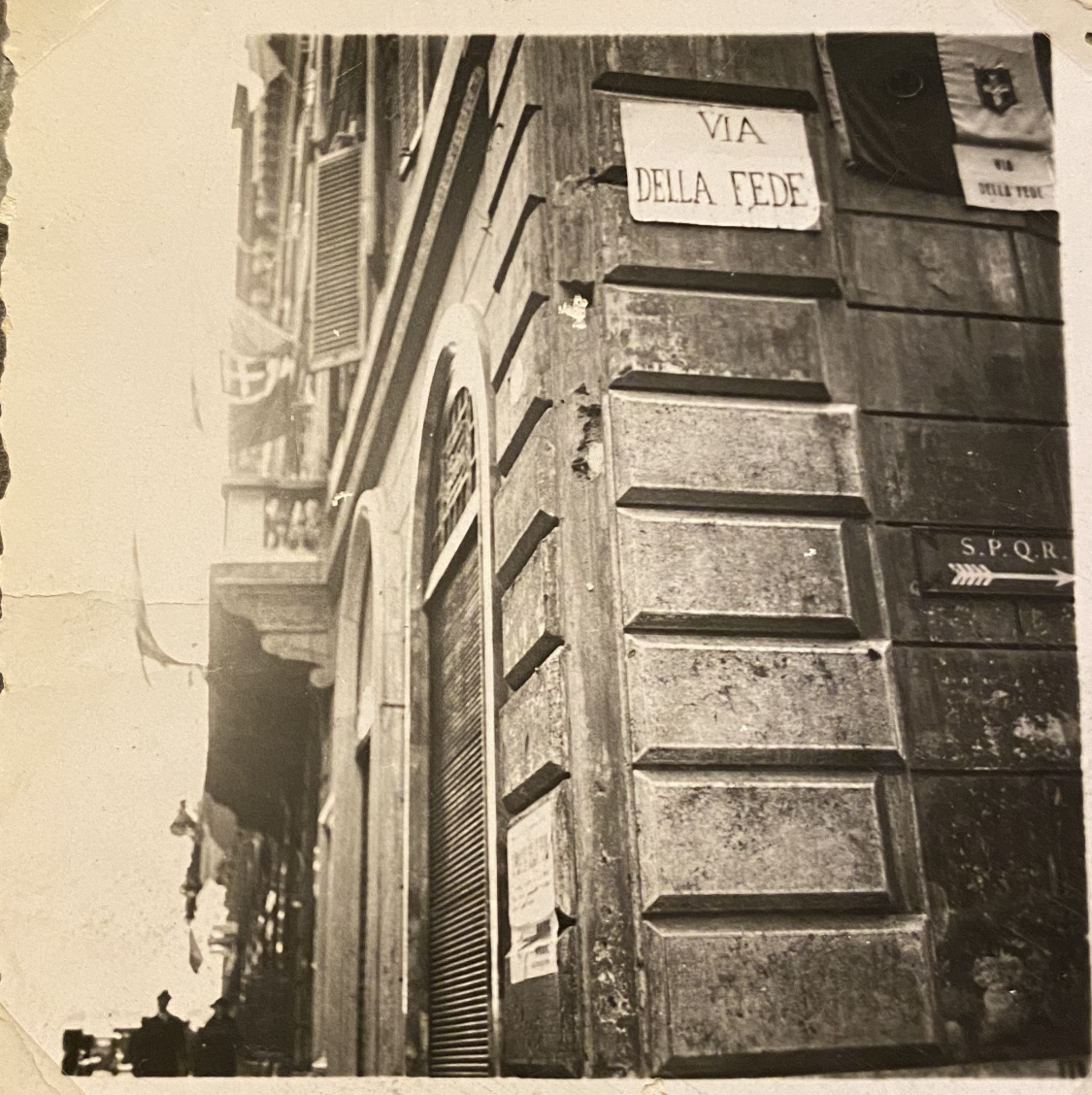
The name of "Vicolo Doria" in Rome was temporarily changed to "Via della Fede" after Prince Filippo Andrea VI Doria Pamphili refused to participate in the Oro alla Patria campaign.

Oro alla Patria ("Gold for the Fatherland") was a nationwide fundraising campaign organized by the Fascist regime on 18 December 1935, during which Italians donated their gold to the state.

== Sanctions ==
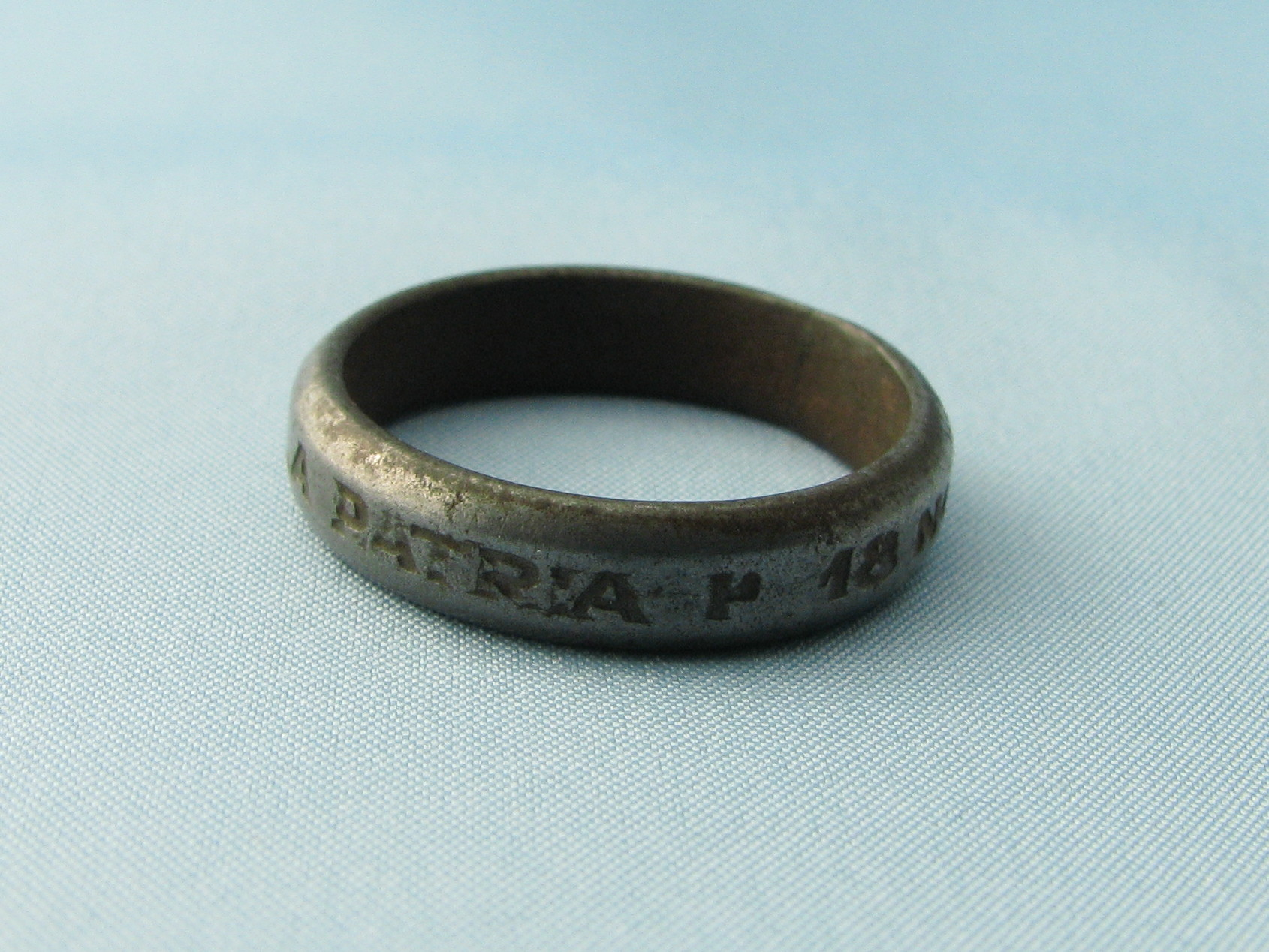
Iron ring given to those who donated their gold wedding ring

On 3 October 1935, the Kingdom of Italy attacked and invaded Ethiopia, following the Abyssinia Crisis. On 6 October, the League of Nations officially condemned the Italian attack and, four days later, its Assembly created an eighteen-member committee tasked with studying economic sanctions against Fascist Italy. On 3 November, the sanctions discussed by the committee were approved, with entry into force scheduled for 18 November.

The sanctions proved ineffective, as many countries were not members of the League and several members, including some major powers, did not strictly comply. The measures banned the export of Italian products abroad and prohibited Italy from importing materials useful for military purposes, but they did not cover materials of vital importance such as petroleum and coal, which Italy lacked.

The United Kingdom and France argued that denying oil supplies to Italy could easily be circumvented by obtaining fuel from the United States and Nazi Germany, which were not League members. The United States, while condemning the Italian attack, considered it inappropriate that sanctions had been voted by colonial powers such as France and the United Kingdom.

== "Wedding ring Day" ==
The adoption of even mild sanctions sparked resentment among Italians toward the League of Nations and triggered domestic mobilization. The collection of metals for the war effort began, and Italy launched the Oro alla Patria campaign. One month after the League's decision, 18 December was proclaimed the "Wedding ring Day" (Giornata della fede), when Italians donated their wedding rings to support the costs of the ongoing Second Italo-Ethiopian War.

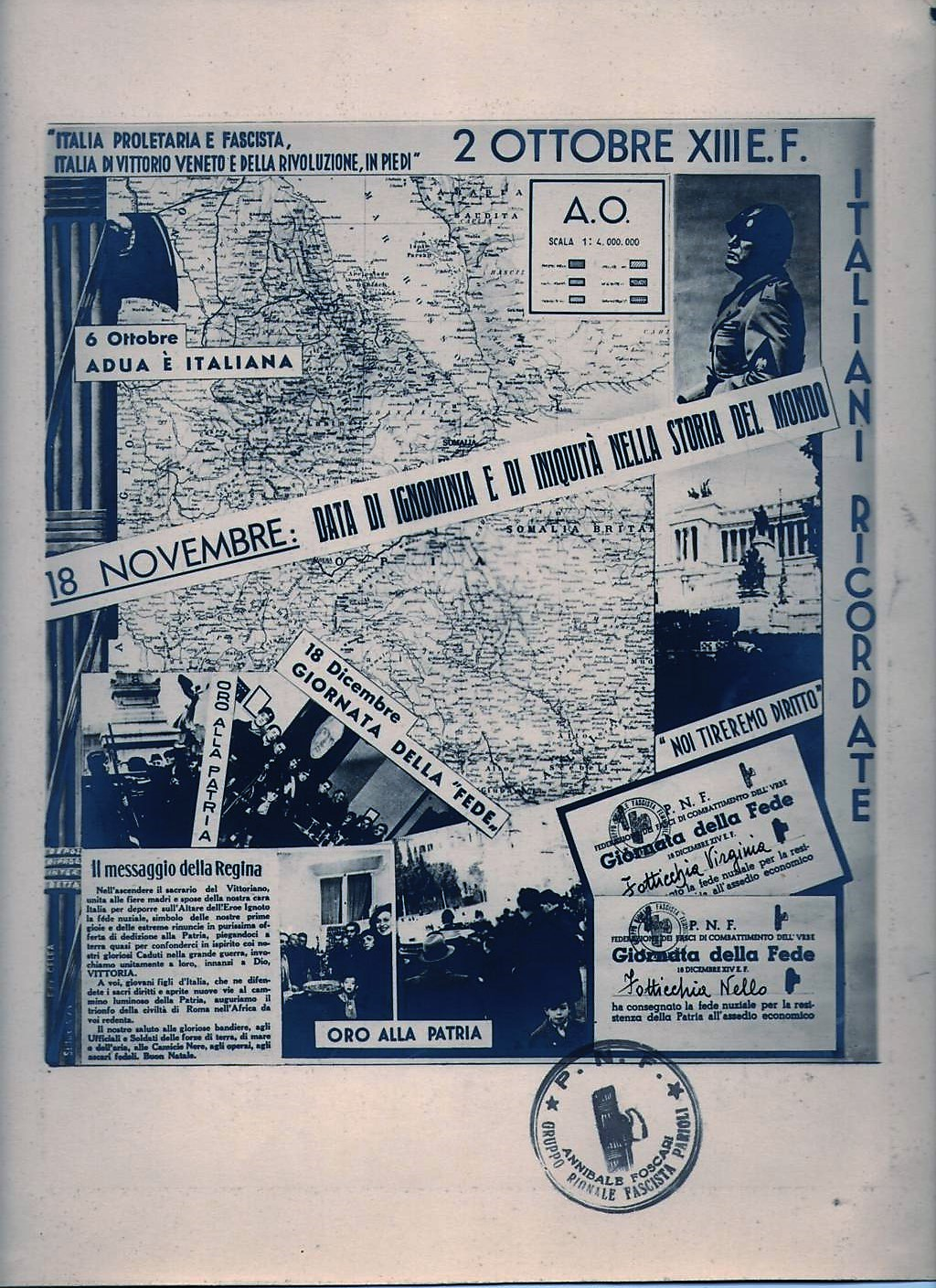
Certificate of donation of wedding rings issued by the Fascist neighborhood group of Parioli, Rome

The main ceremony took place at the Altar of the Fatherland in Rome. The first to donate her wedding ring, together with that of her husband, was Queen Elena of Montenegro. She was followed by Rachele Mussolini and numerous women from Rome. In her memoirs, the head of government's wife recalled also donating half a kilogram of gold and two and a half quintals of silver, gifts received by her husband.

In Rome alone, more than 250,000 rings were collected, while about 180,000 were gathered in Milan, amid other personal gold jewelry and objects totaling 57,114.395 kilograms of gold and 360,618.470 of silver.

Many prominent figures of the time, even those not supportive of the regime, described the ceremony as the greatest mass patriotic expression in Italian history. Notable donors included the royal family (King Victor Emmanuel III donated gold ingots; Queen Elena her ring; Prince Umberto the Supreme Order of the Most Holy Annunciation collar), as well as famous figures such as Guglielmo Marconi, Luigi Pirandello, Gabriele D'Annunzio, Luigi Albertini, and Benedetto Croce. Church hierarchies also encouraged clergy participation. The football club FC Vado donated the 1922 Coppa Italia, which was consequently destroyed.

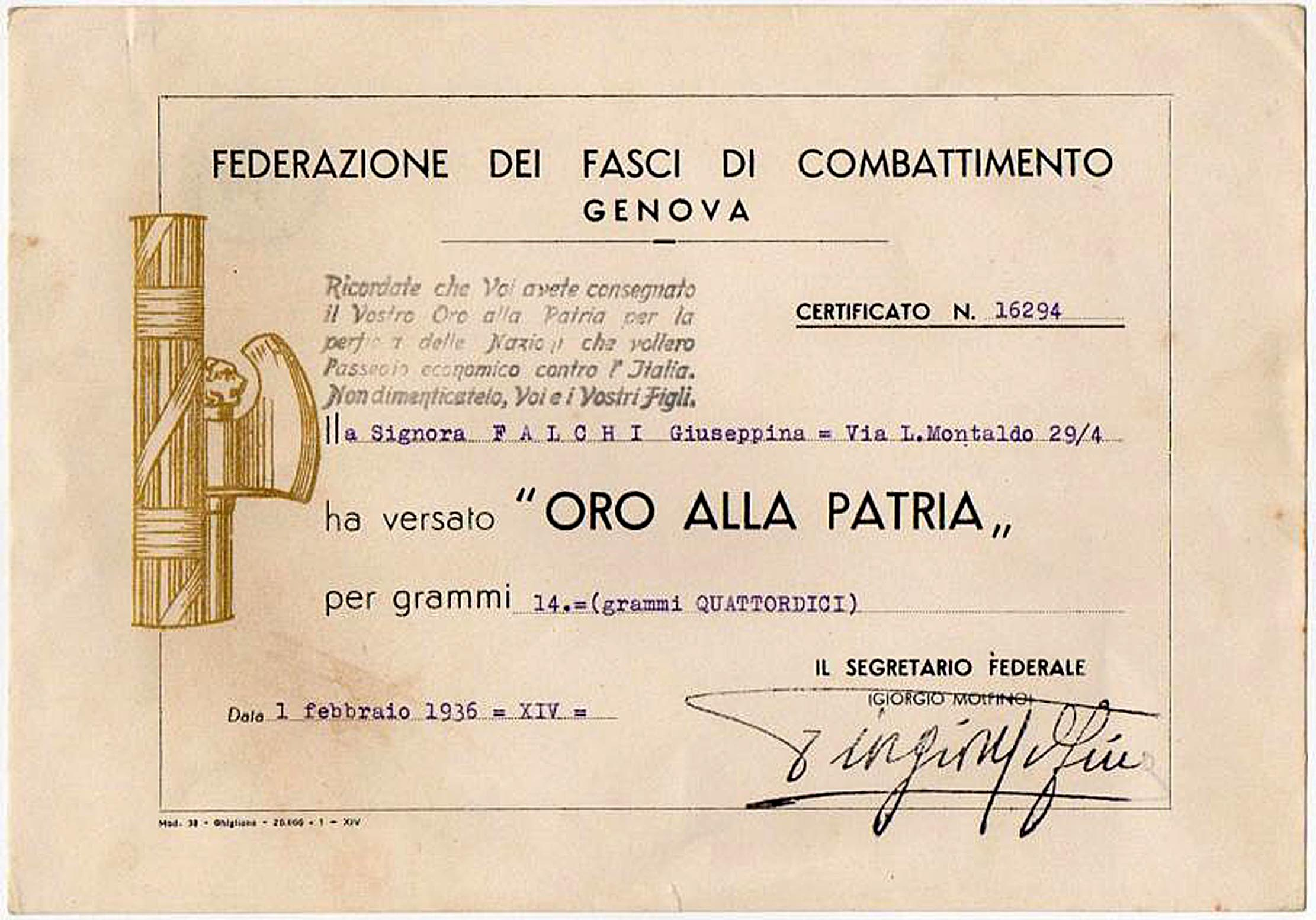
Receipt from the Genoa section of the National Fascist Party certifying the donation of a gold wedding ring

Among the dissidents stood out Prince Filippo Andrea VI Doria Pamphili and his wife Princess Gesine Doria Pamphili. After Princess Gesine refused Queen Elena's invitation to donate her ring, authorities temporarily renamed "Vicolo Doria" as "Via della Fede"; the original name was restored after the Liberation of Rome.

Donors received an iron ring stamped: ORO ALLA PATRIA – 18 NOV. XIV.

A total of 37 tonnes of gold and 115 tonnes of silver were collected and, according to regime statements, sent to the Italian State Mint as national assets.

Two jugs filled with wedding rings were found on 27 April 1945 by the 52nd Garibaldi Brigade "Luigi Clerici" among the valuables of fleeing Fascist leaders with Mussolini, the so-called Dongo Treasure.

== Bibliography ==
- Renzo De Felice (2002). Breve storia del fascismo [Brief History of Fascism] (in Italian). Mondadori.
- Arrigo Petacco (2005). Faccetta nera. Storia della conquista dell'impero [Faccetta Nera: History of the Conquest of the Empire] (in Italian). Milan: Mondadori.
- Domenico Quirico (2002). Lo squadrone bianco [The White Squadron] (in Italian). Milan: Mondadori. ISBN 88-04-50691-1.
- Edoardo Susmel; Duilio Susmel (1951). Opera omnia di Benito Mussolini [Complete Works of Benito Mussolini] (in Italian). Florence: La Fenice.
- Petra Terhoeven (2006). Oro alla Patria. Donne, guerra e propaganda nella giornata della Fede fascista [Gold for the Fatherland: Women, War, and Propaganda in the Fascist Day of Faith] (in Italian). Il Mulino.

== See also ==
- Fundraising
- Gold-collecting campaign ^{(1998 fundraising campaign equivalent in South Korea)}
