= Battle of the Adda River =

| Date | 11 August 490 |
| Location | Adda River |
| Result | Gothic victory |

Belligerents
| Ostrogoths; Visigoths | Heruls; Scirians |

Commanders and leaders
| Theodoric the Great | Odoacer |

Strength
| Unknown | Unknown |

Casualties and losses
| Unknown | Unknown |

The Battle of the Adda River occurred in 490 between the Ostrogothic Forces under Theodoric and the remaining army of the Heruli and Sciri under Flavius Odoacer.
