= Germasino =

- Interactive map of Germasino
- Coordinates: 46°08′N 09°16′E
- Country: Italy
- Region: Lombardy
- Province: Como
- Municipality: Gravedona e Uniti

Area
  - Total: 18.2 km^{2} (7.0 sq mi)
- Elevation: 570 m (1,870 ft)

Population
  - Total: 255
  - Density: 14.0/km^{2} (36.3/sq mi)
- Demonym: germasinesi

Germasino was a former municipality in the Province of Como in the Italian region Lombardy, located about 70 kilometres (43 mi) north of Milan and about 40 kilometres (25 mi) northeast of Como, on the border with Switzerland. On May 16, 2011, it was annexed by Gravedona, following an act of fusion passed by Lombardy Region.

When it was disbanded, it had a population of 253 and an area of 18.2 km^{2} (7.0 sq mi). Germasino bordered the municipalities of Consiglio di Rumo, Dongo, Garzeno, San Nazzaro Val Cavargna, Stazzona and, in Switzerland, Roveredo, San Vittore and Sant'Antonio.

== Demographic evolution ==
Historical population

Year	Pop.	±%
1861	606	—
1871	529	−12.7%
1881	483	−8.7%
1901	326	−32.5%
1911	348	+6.7%

Year	Pop.	±%
1921	335	−3.7%
1931	299	−10.7%
1936	347	+16.1%
1951	358	+3.2%
1961	331	−7.5%

Year	Pop.	±%
1971	292	−11.8%
1981	267	−8.6%
1991	260	−2.6%
2001	255	−1.9%

Source: Data from ISTAT
