= Peglio, Lombardy =

Peglio Pej (Lombard)
- Comune
- Comune di Peglio
- Location within Italy Location within Lombardy
- Coordinates: 46°9′N 9°17′E
- Country: Italy
- Region: Lombardy
- Province: Province of Como (CO)

Area
  - Total: 10.8 km^{2} (4.2 sq mi)

Population (Dec. 2004)
  - Total: 209
  - Density: 19.4/km^{2} (50.1/sq mi)
- Demonym: Pegliesi
- Time zone: UTC+1 (CET)
  - Summer (DST): UTC+2 (CEST)
- Postal code: 22010
- Dialing code: 0344

Peglio (Comasco: Pej [ˈpɛj]) is a comune (municipality) in the Province of Como in the Italian region Lombardy, located about 80 kilometres (50 mi) north of Milan and about 40 kilometres (25 mi) northeast of Como. As of 31 December 2004, it had a population of 209 and an area of 10.8 square kilometres (4.2 mi^{2}).

Peglio borders the following municipalities: Domaso, Dosso del Liro, Gravedona, Livo.

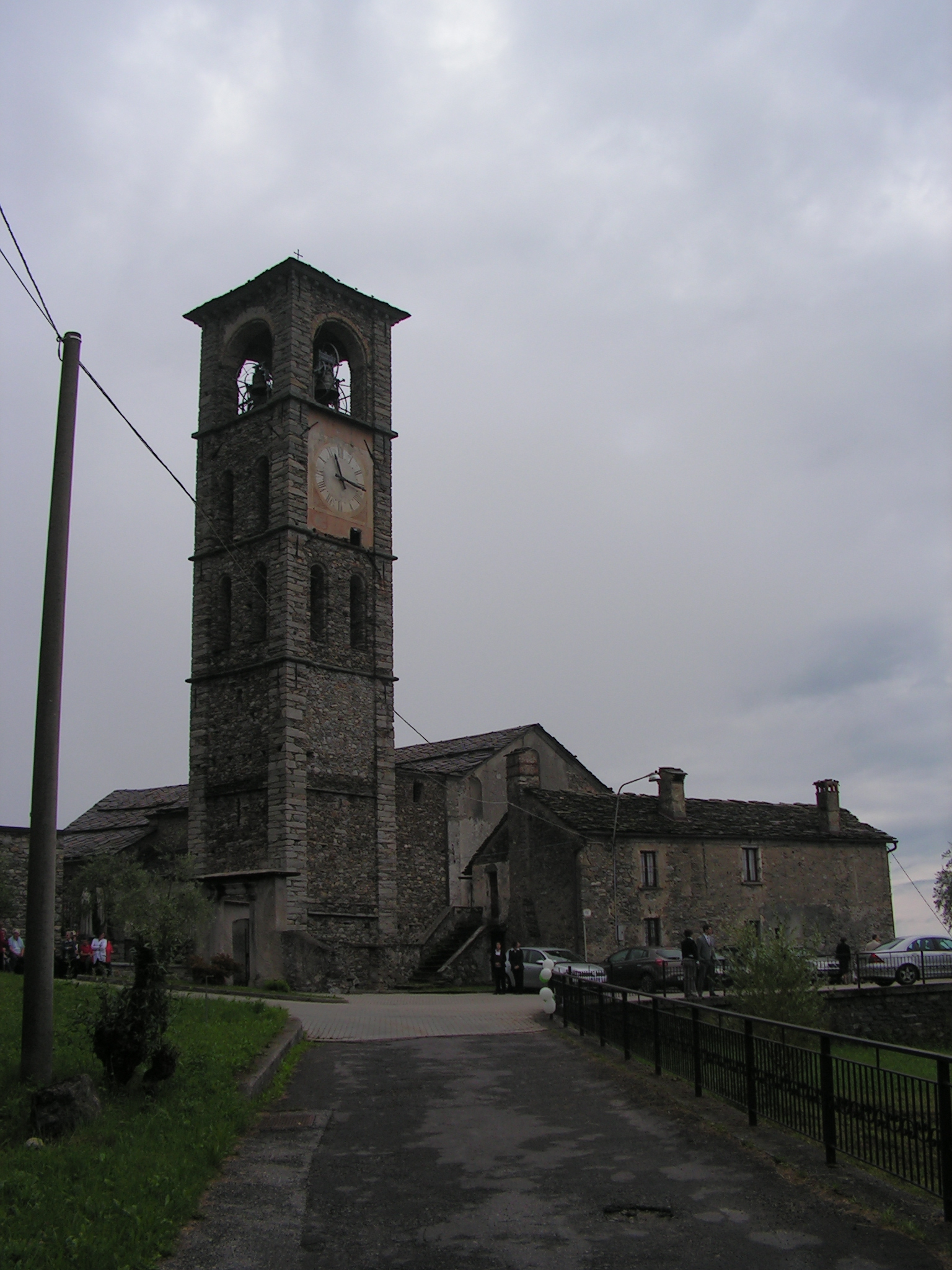
the Church of Eusebio e Vittore

== Demographic evolution ==
Historical population

Year	Pop.	±%
1861	463	—
1871	415	−10.4%
1881	351	−15.4%
1901	343	−2.3%
1911	341	−0.6%

Year	Pop.	±%
1921	350	+2.6%
1931	317	−9.4%
1936	325	+2.5%
1951	305	−6.2%
1961	259	−15.1%

Year	Pop.	±%
1971	241	−6.9%
1981	207	−14.1%
1991	168	−18.8%
2001	197	+17.3%

Source: Data from ISTAT
