= Stazzona =

Stazzona Stazóna (Lombard)
- Comune
- Comune di Villa di Tirano
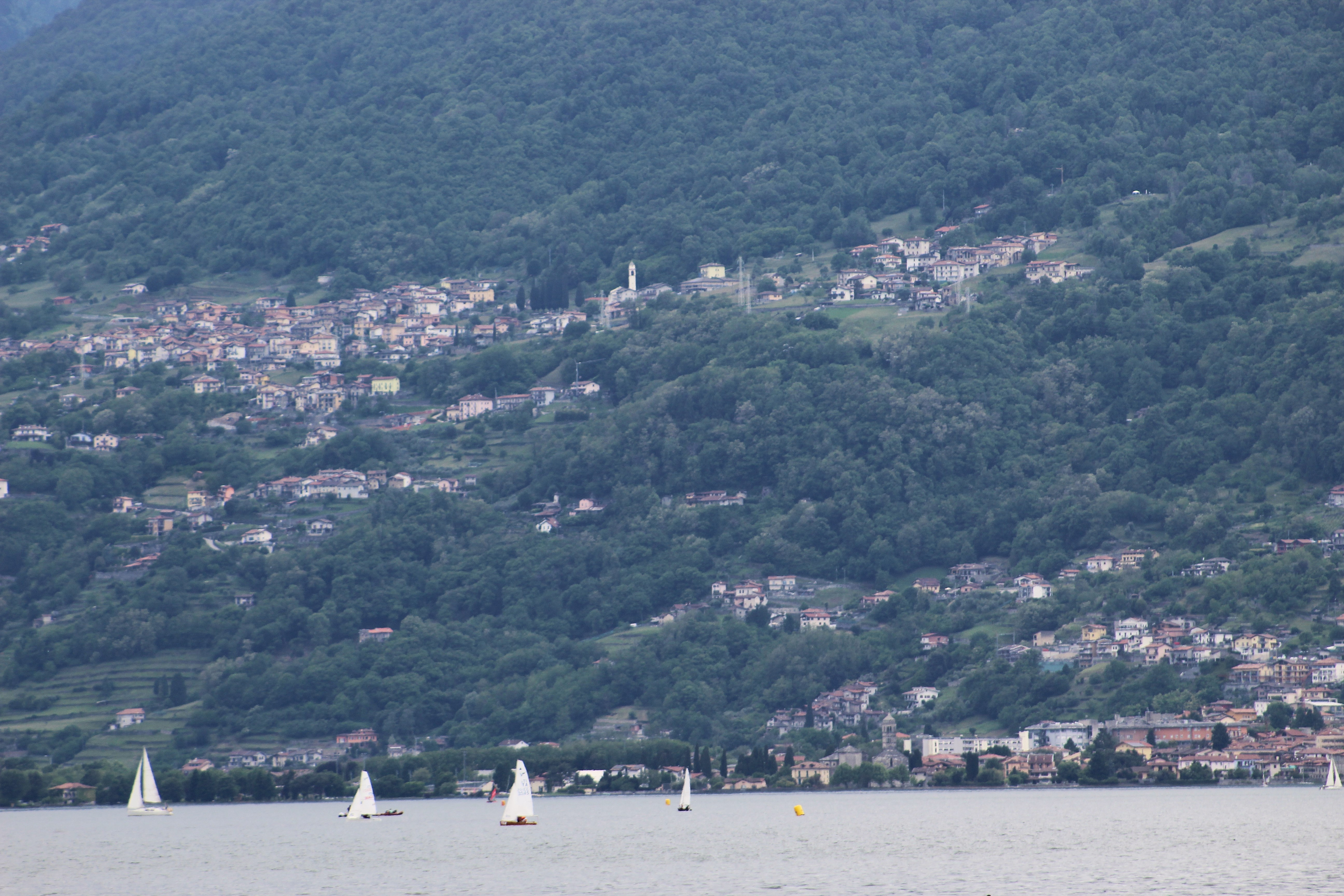

- Location within Italy Location within Lombardy
- Coordinates: 46°8′N 9°16′E
- Country: Italy
- Region: Lombardy
- Province: Province of Como (Co)

Area
  - Total: 7.5 km^{2} (2.9 sq mi)

Population (Dec. 2004)
  - Total: 672
  - Density: 90/km^{2} (230/sq mi)
- Time zone: UTC+1 (CET)
  - Summer (DST): UTC+2 (CEST)
- Postal code: 22010
- Dialing code: 0344

Stazzona (Comasco: Stazóna [ʃtaˈtsoːna]) is a comune (municipality) in the Province of Como in the Italian region Lombardy, located about 70 kilometres (43 mi) north of Milan and about 40 kilometres (25 mi) northeast of Como. As of 31 December 2004, it had a population of 672 and an area of 7.5 square kilometres (2.9 mi^{2}).

Stazzona borders the following municipalities: Consiglio di Rumo, Dongo, Germasino.

== Demographic evolution ==
Historical population

Year	Pop.	±%
1861	809	—
1871	760	−6.1%
1881	732	−3.7%
1901	570	−22.1%
1911	581	+1.9%

Year	Pop.	±%
1921	453	−22.0%
1931	528	+16.6%
1936	559	+5.9%
1951	649	+16.1%
1961	665	+2.5%

Year	Pop.	±%
1971	654	−1.7%
1981	633	−3.2%
1991	657	+3.8%
2001	675	+2.7%

Source: Data from ISTAT
