= Livo (river) =

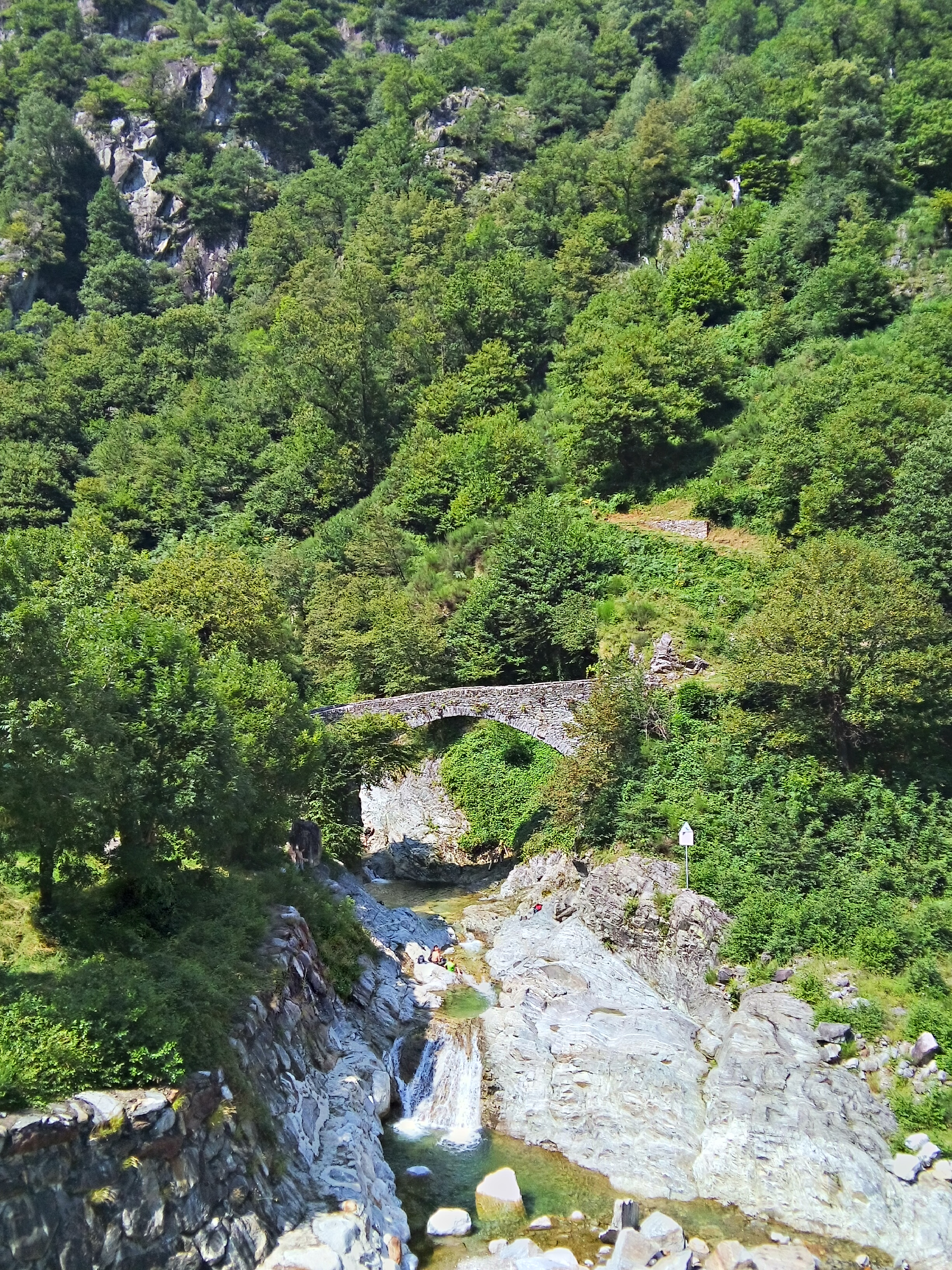

Location
- Country: Italy

Physical characteristics
- Mouth: Lake Como
  - coordinates: 46°08′56″N 9°19′48″E

Basin features
- Progression: Lake Como→ Adda→ Po→ Adriatic Sea

The Livo (Italian: Torrente di Livo) is an Italian river that rises at an elevation of about 1,800 metres (5,900 ft) in the alpine basin of Lake Darengo, northwest of Lake Como. The river runs through the homonymous valley and flows into Lake Como in Domaso.

== Path ==
The path to the Pozze di Domaso begins in the lakeside village of Domaso, near the historic Church of San Bartolomeo.
