= Gravedona ed Uniti =

Comune in Lombardy, Italy

Gravedona ed Uniti Gravedùna
- Comune
- Comune di Gravedona ed Uniti
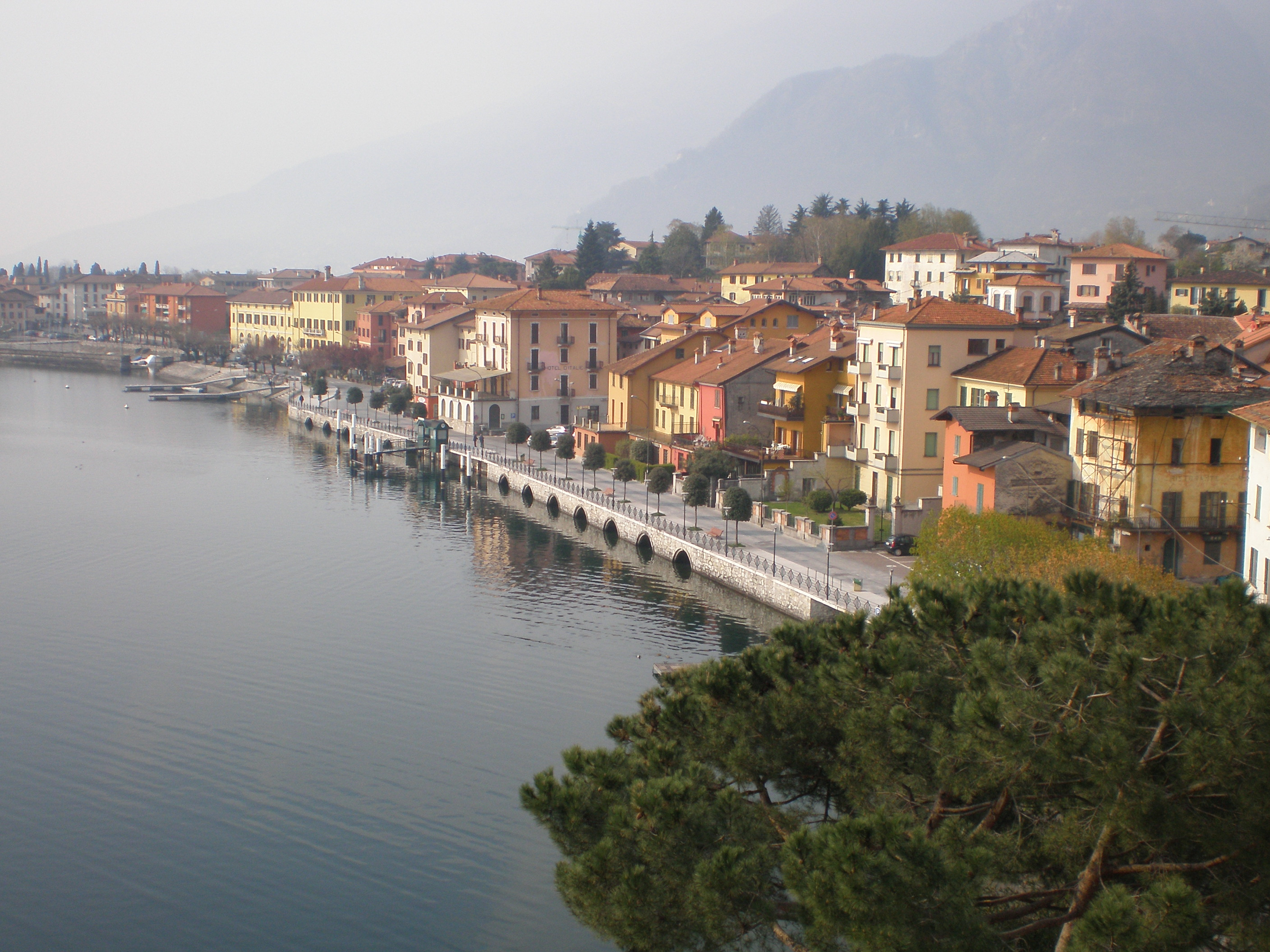

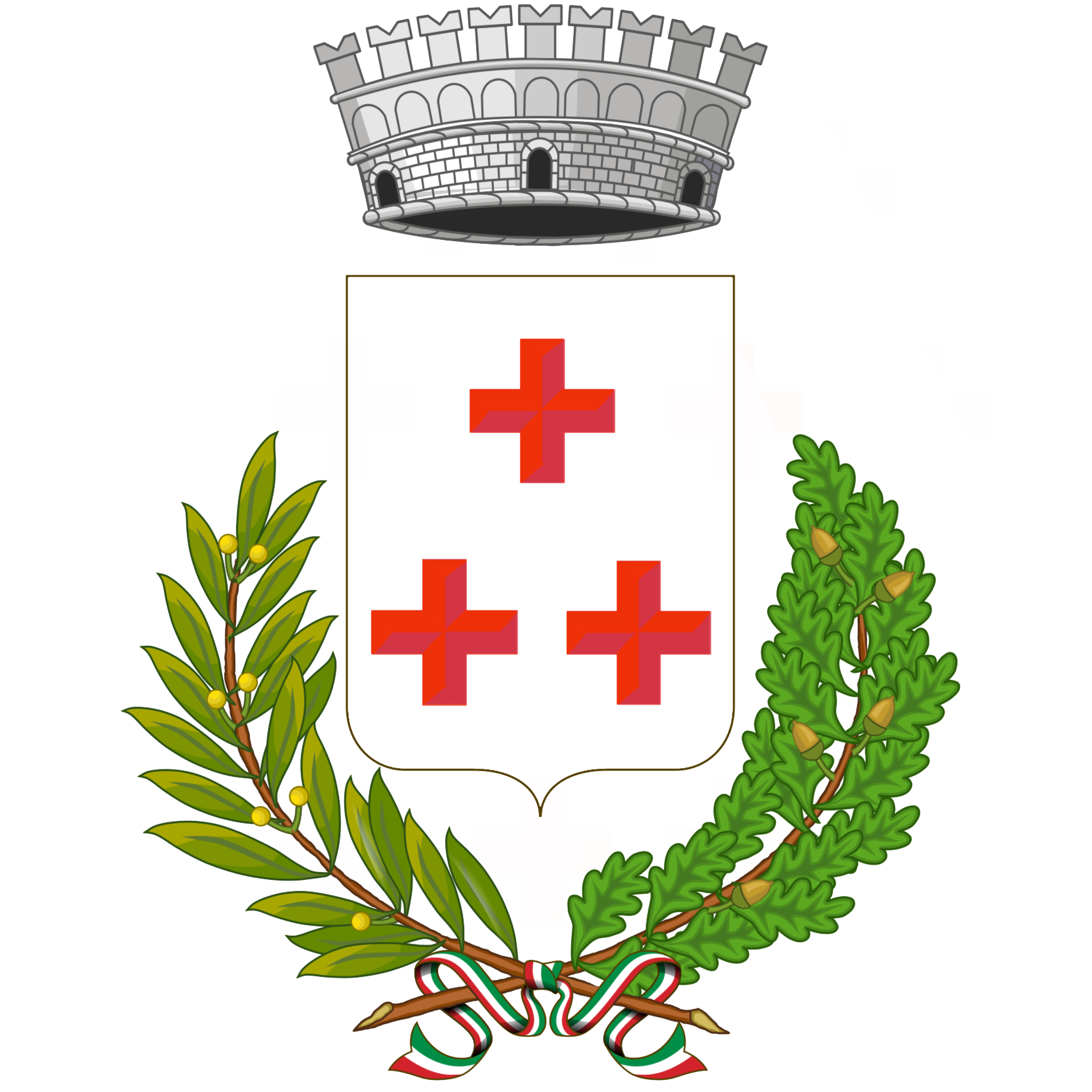
- Coat of arms

- Location within Italy Location within Lombardy
- Coordinates: 46°9′N 9°18′E
- Country: Italy
- Region: Lombardy
- Province: Province of Como (CO)
- Frazioni: Negrana, San Carlo, Segna, Trevisa, Traversa, Germasino, Consiglio di Rumo

Government
  - Mayor: Fiorenzo Bongiasca (No-party)

Area
  - Total: 40.8 km^{2} (15.8 sq mi)
- Elevation: 201 m (659 ft)

Population (May 2011)
  - Total: 4,222
  - Density: 103/km^{2} (268/sq mi)
- Demonym: Gravedonesi
- Time zone: UTC+1 (CET)
  - Summer (DST): UTC+2 (CEST)
- Postal code: 22015
- Dialing code: 0344
- Website: www.comune.gravedonaeduniti.co.it

Gravedona ed Uniti is a comune (municipality) in the province of Como in the Italian region of Lombardy, located about 80 kilometres (50 mi) north of Milan and about 40 kilometres (25 mi) northeast of Como.

The municipality of Gravedona ed Uniti contains the frazioni (subdivisions, mainly villages and hamlets) of Negrana, San Carlo, Segna, Trevisa, Traversa and, following an act of fusion passed by Lombardy Region, the annexed former municipalities of Consiglio di Rumo and Germasino, included on 16 May 2011. Before 2011, comune was known simply as Gravedona.

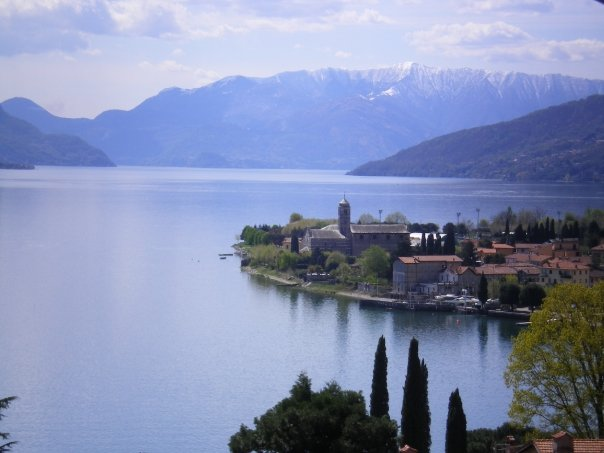
Partial view of the town with the lake

The town of Gravedona has a small harbour and overlooks Lake Como and the eastern shoreline. On 31 December 2004, it had a population of 2,669 and an area of 6.2 square kilometres (2.4 sq mi). After the enlargement of 2011, the municipality rose to an area of 40.8 square kilometres (15.8 sq mi) and a population of 4,222 inhabitants.

Gravedona is situated at the mouth of a gorge. The handsome Palazzo del Pero with four towers, at the upper end, was built in 1586 by Pellegrino Tibaldi for the Milanese Cardinal Tolomeo Gallio. Adjoining the venerable church of San Vincenzo rises the 12th century Romanesque Baptistery of Santa Maria del Tiglio, with campanile, containing two Christian inscriptions of the 5th century.

The old vacation home of Alessandro Volta is located near Palazzo Del Pero at Villa Stampa, where Volta also spent his honeymoon. Villa Stampa was granted to Volta by the Stampa family of Gravedona, a noble family at the time. On the wall of the villa is an engraved plaque with a dedication to the Stampa family and Alessandro Volta.

Gravedona ed Uniti borders the following municipalities: Colico, Domaso, Dongo, Dosso del Liro, Garzeno, San Nazzaro Val Cavargna, Peglio, Stazzona and, in Switzerland, Roveredo, Sant'Antonio and San Vittore.

== Demographic evolution ==
Historical population

Year	Pop.	±%
1861	1,909	—
1871	1,983	+3.9%
1881	1,950	−1.7%
1901	2,024	+3.8%
1911	2,054	+1.5%

Year	Pop.	±%
1921	1,974	−3.9%
1931	2,056	+4.2%
1936	2,182	+6.1%
1951	2,631	+20.6%
1961	2,771	+5.3%

Year	Pop.	±%
1971	2,784	+0.5%
1981	2,792	+0.3%
1991	2,695	−3.5%
2001	2,611	−3.1%
2011	4,222	+61.7%

Source: Data from ISTAT, from 2011 including Consiglio di Rumo and Germasino
