= Val Pola landslide =

1987 landslide in Italy

Coordinates: 46.379°N 10.340°E

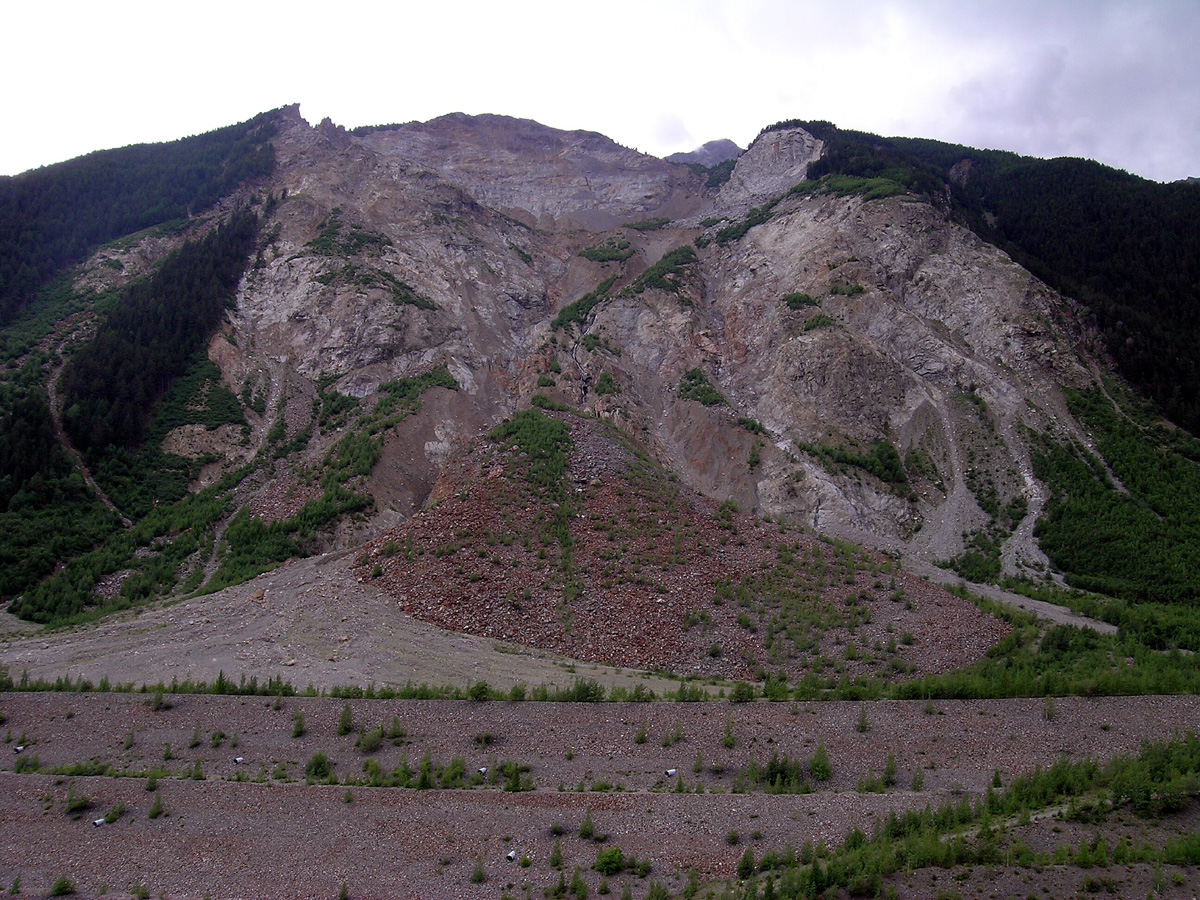
Pizzo Coppetto - Alta Valtellina (Sondrio)

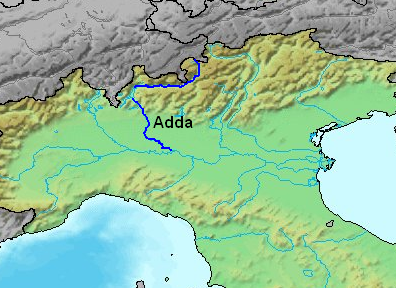
Adda River location

The Val Pola landslide (Val Pola rock avalanche) happened in Valtellina, Lombardy, Northern Italian Alps, on 28 July 1987 and resulted in the Valtellina disaster (destruction of villages, road closure, and flooding threat) with a total cost of 400 million euros. The calamity affected the province of Sondrio, but also other Alpine valleys in the provinces of Brescia, Bergamo, Lecco, and Como.

During June and July 1987 Valtellina witnessed an exceptionally high rainfall accompanied with rapid glacier melting due to the relatively high altitude of the 0 degree isotherm. As a result, the Val Pola Creek significantly eroded its valley flanks, including the area of debris accumulation of post-glacial landslides. This resulted in a fracture which detached an estimated volume of 35–45 million cubic metres of old debris from the Northern slope of the Mount Zandila (Eastern side of Pizzo Coppetto) first detected on 25 July. On 26 July evacuations of local villages started. The fracture eventually produced a rapid rock avalanche with subsequent shallow landslides of the Val Pola sides and a debris flow along the Val Pola thalweg. The flow entrained an estimated 5–8 million cubic meters of debris. The created alluvial fan dammed the Adda River and created a lake. The mass ran about 1.5 km downstream and generated an upstream mud wave 35 m high which traveled about 2.7 km.

Twenty-two people were killed by the main landslide, which caused a huge wave in the temporary lake created by a previous, smaller landslide.

The landslide resulted in a 35 m deepening of the Val Pola canyon.

The debris from the Val Pola rock avalanche and landslide impounded on the Adda River creating a lake with 6 million cubic meters of water. The landslide itself obliterated 5 villages and six hamlets with 43 people dying of various disaster-related causes. The total cost of the disaster and several months of its mitigation was about 400 million euros.

The resulting lake created a threat of flooding, because the huge amount of accumulated water threatened to breach the debris dam and flood the Adda valley. Efforts to mitigate the threat included evacuation of about 25,000 people downstream, works to stabilize the debris tongue to prevent spill-over with subsequent dam breach, and works to drain the lake in a controlled manner.

The disaster coincided with the change of the government of Italy, including the replacement of the Minister of Civil Protection, which resulted in a certain amount of policy vacuum and non-optimal decisions.

By appointment of the Ministry of Civil Protection, a large monitoring system was installed on many different sites throughout the Valtellina (Campofranscia, Spriana, Torreggio, Valpola), to check the progress of the landslide phenomena.

In July 2007, a civil protection national exercise, Valtellina 2007, was carried out which simulated hydraulic and hydrogeological risk similar to that of the 1987 disaster.
