= Livo, Lombardy =

Livo Liv (Lombard)
- Comune
- Comune di Livo
- Location within Italy Location within Lombardy
- Coordinates: 46°10′N 9°18′E
- Country: Italy
- Region: Lombardy
- Province: Province of Como (CO)

Area
  - Total: 32.5 km^{2} (12.5 sq mi)

Population (Dec. 2004)
  - Total: 212
  - Density: 6.52/km^{2} (16.9/sq mi)
- Demonym: Livesi
- Time zone: UTC+1 (CET)
  - Summer (DST): UTC+2 (CEST)
- Postal code: 22010
- Dialing code: 0344

Livo (Comasco: Liv [ˈliːf]) is a comune (municipality) in the Province of Como in the Italian region Lombardy, located about 80 kilometres (50 mi) north of Milan and about 40 kilometres (25 mi) northeast of Como, on the border with Switzerland. As of 31 December 2004, it had a population of 212 and an area of 32.5 km^{2} (12.5 sq mi).

Livo borders the following municipalities: Cama (Switzerland), Domaso, Dosso del Liro, Gordona, Peglio, Samolaco, Vercana.

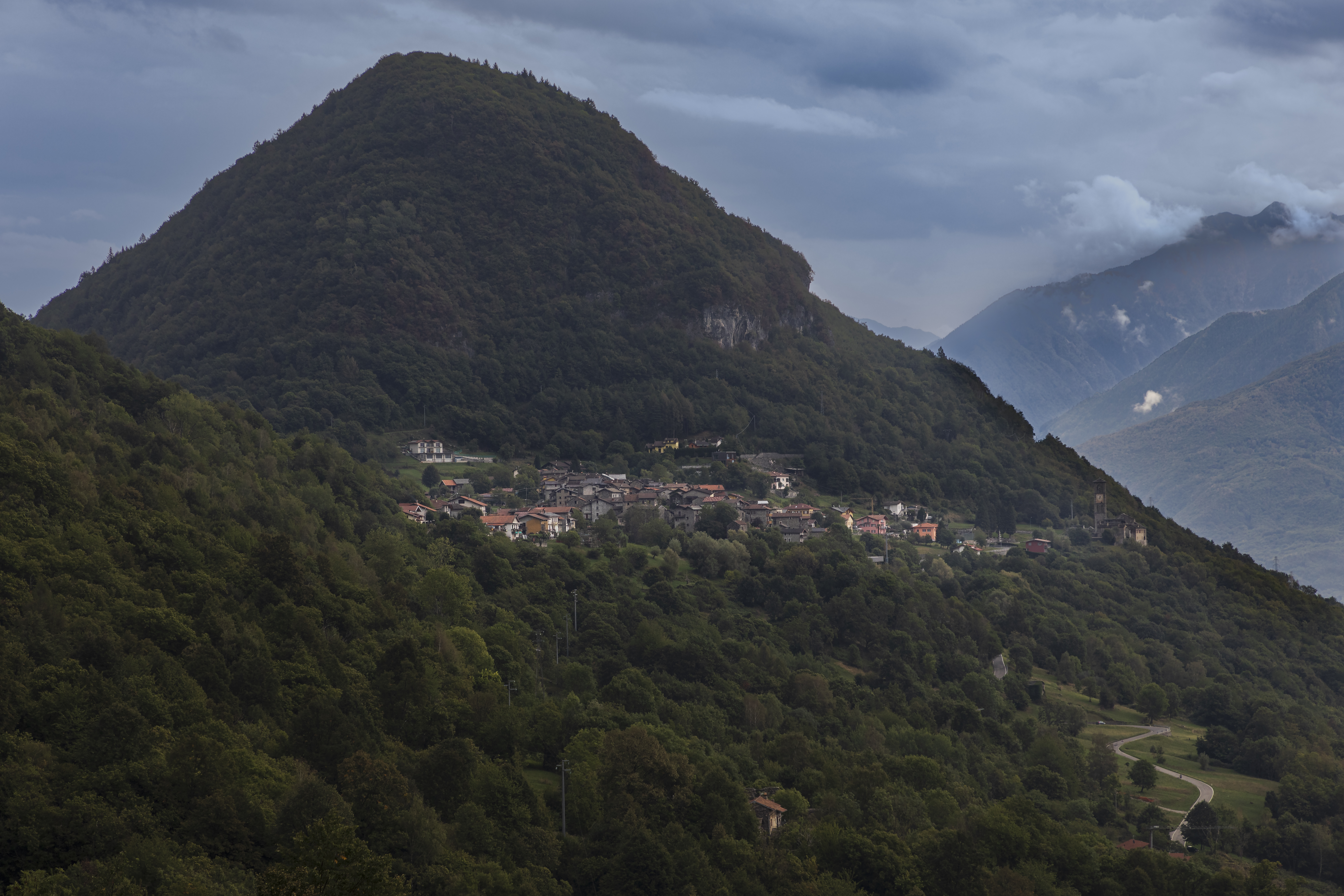
View of Livo from Piazza della Chiesa in Dosso del Liro.

== Demographic evolution ==
Historical population

Year	Pop.	±%
1861	868	—
1871	891	+2.6%
1881	920	+3.3%
1901	838	−8.9%
1911	818	−2.4%

Year	Pop.	±%
1921	722	−11.7%
1931	616	−14.7%
1936	594	−3.6%
1951	493	−17.0%
1961	395	−19.9%

Year	Pop.	±%
1971	300	−24.1%
1981	233	−22.3%
1991	219	−6.0%
2001	208	−5.0%

Source: Data from ISTAT
