= Domaso =

Domaso Dumàs (Lombard)
- Comune
- Comune di Domaso
- Location within Italy Location within Lombardy
- Coordinates: 46°9′N 9°20′E
- Country: Italy
- Region: Lombardy
- Province: Province of Como (CO)

Area
  - Total: 6.1 km^{2} (2.4 sq mi)

Population (Dec. 2004)
  - Total: 1,461
  - Density: 240/km^{2} (620/sq mi)
- Demonym: Domasini
- Time zone: UTC+1 (CET)
  - Summer (DST): UTC+2 (CEST)
- Postal code: 22013
- Dialing code: 0344

Domaso (Comasco: Dumàs [duˈmaːs]) is a comune (municipality) in the Province of Como in the Italian region Lombardy, located about 80 kilometres (50 mi) north of Milan and about 40 kilometres (25 mi) northeast of Como. As of 9 October 2011, it had a population of 1,455 and an area of 6.1 km^{2} (2.4 sq mi).

Domaso borders the following municipalities: Colico, Gravedona, Livo, Peglio, Vercana.

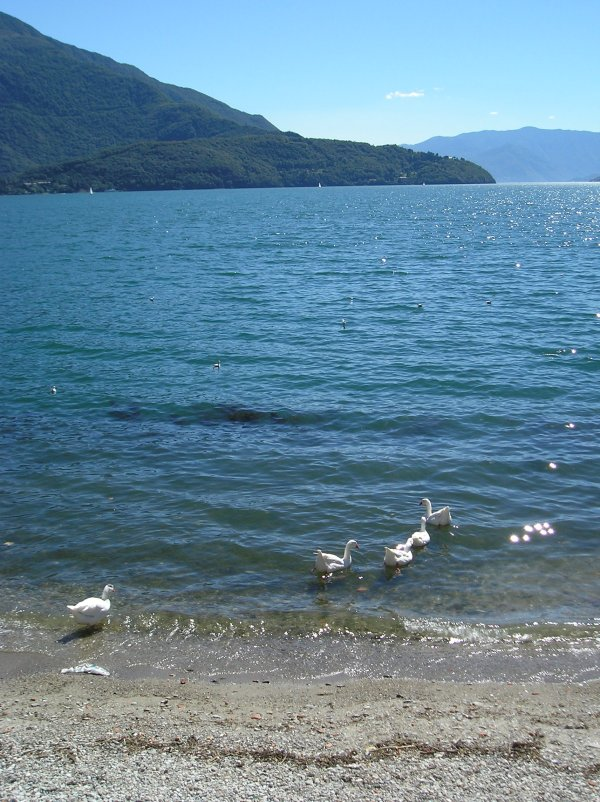
Domaso Beach

== History ==
Between 1634 and 1640 the governor and philanthropist Louis Paniza, maternal ancestor of the collaborator of the Founding Fathers of the United States Luis de Unzaga, rebuilt the Church of Saint Bartholomew, the convent and in that church he built a chapel where he had two schools also founded, with the salaries of their respective teachers.

== Demographic evolution ==
Historical population

Year	Pop.	±%
1861	1,478	—
1871	1,528	+3.4%
1881	1,351	−11.6%
1901	1,205	−10.8%
1911	1,112	−7.7%

Year	Pop.	±%
1921	1,092	−1.8%
1931	1,136	+4.0%
1936	1,154	+1.6%
1951	1,276	+10.6%
1961	1,241	−2.7%

Year	Pop.	±%
1971	1,342	+8.1%
1981	1,434	+6.9%
1991	1,454	+1.4%
2001	1,438	−1.1%

Source: Data from ISTAT

At the CARIPLO Bank of Domaso were kept the secret documents taken from Benito Mussolini on 27 April 1945. They were put there by the Partisan Pedro and Horfman a Swiss-British double agent. Winston Churchill visited there, looking for some of the missing documents on 7 September 1945 and went to have a tea with the bank's manager Ermanno Gibezzi. He had it in his home, ignoring that he had been recently appointed there. The real director that had seen the documents, Luigi Rumi, had retired a few weeks before.
