= Consiglio di Rumo =

- Frazione
- Location of Consiglio di Rumo in Italy
- Coordinates: 46°9′N 9°18′E
- Country: Italy
- Region: Lombardy
- Province: Como (CO)
- Comune: Grevedona ed Uniti

Population (31 December 2010)
  - Total: 1,202
- Demonym: Consigliorumesi
- Time zone: UTC+1 (CET)
  - Summer (DST): UTC+2 (CEST)
- Postal code: 22010
- Dialing code: 0344

Consiglio di Rumo is a frazione of the comune of Gravedona ed Uniti, Province of Como, Lombardy, northern Italy, located about 80 kilometres (50 mi) north of Milan and about 40 kilometres (25 mi) northeast of Como, on the border with Switzerland. It was a separate comune until May 16, 2011, when it was annexed by Gravedona, following an act of fusion passed by Lombardy Region.
