= Anselmi =

Anselmi is an Italian surname, a cognate of Anselm. Notable people with the surname include:

- Adolfo L. Monserrate Anselmi (1909–1983), Puerto Rican politician
- Enrico Anselmi, Italian racing driver
- Fabrizio Anselmi (born 1978), Italian footballer
- Federico Anselmi (born 1982), Argentine rugby referee
- Franco Anselmi (1956–1978), Italian neofascist terrorist
- Giorgio Anselmi (1723–1797), Italian painter
- Giuseppe Anselmi (1876–1929), Italian opera singer
- Humberto Monserrate Anselmi, American agronomist engineer of Puerto Rican descent
- Lucia Contini Anselmi (1876–1913), Italian classical pianist and composer
- Martín Anselmi (born 1985), Argentine football manager
- Michelangelo Anselmi (c. 1492–1554), Italian painter
- Nicolò Anselmi (born 1961), Italian Catholic prelate
- Renato Anselmi (1891–1973), Italian fencer
- Rosina Anselmi (1880–1965), Italian actress
- Thomas Anselmi, Canadian musician
- Tina Anselmi (1927–2016), Italian politician and Italian resistance member
- Tom Anselmi (born c. 1956), Canadian businessman
- William Anselmi, Italian-born Canadian academic and writer
