= Nevola =

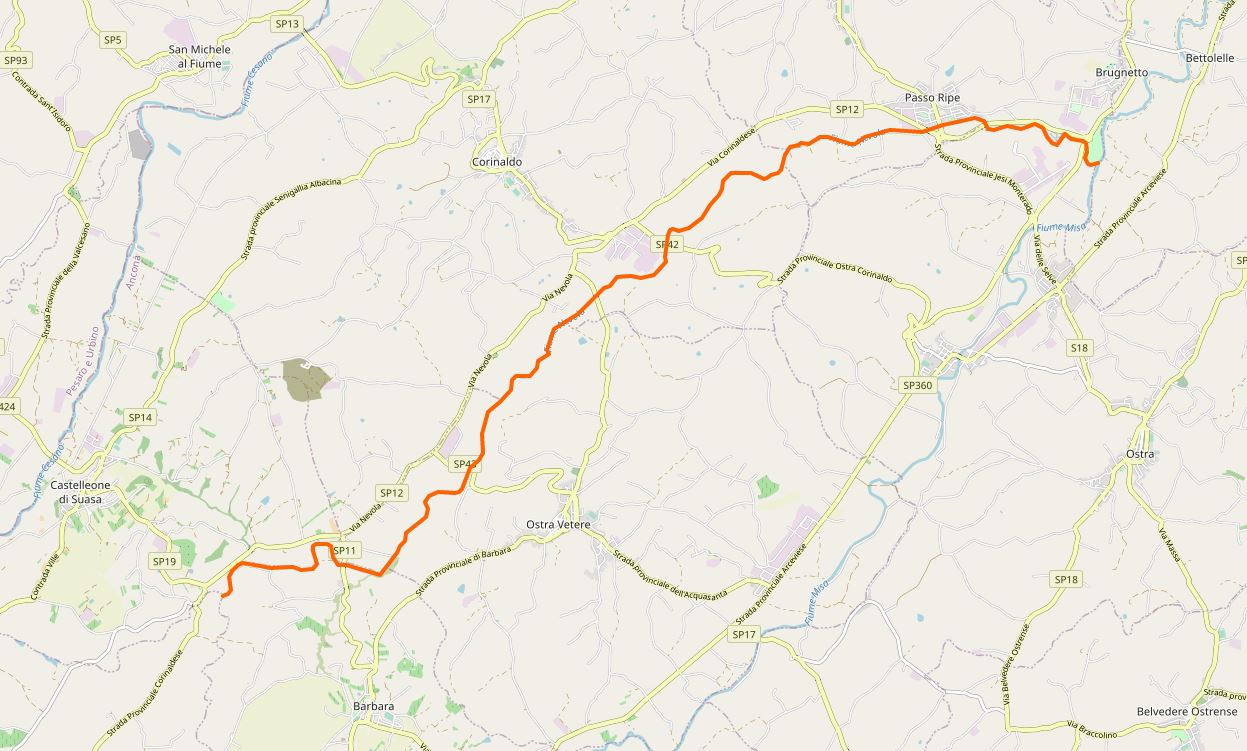

Location
- Country: Italy

Physical characteristics
- Source
  - location: Province of Ancona, near Arcevia
- Mouth
  - location: Misa
  - coordinates: 43°38′55″N 13°09′03″E
- Length: 19 km (12 mi)

Basin features
- Progression: Misa→ Adriatic Sea

The Nevola (Latin: Sena) is a river in the Marche region of Italy. Its source is near Arcevia in the province of Ancona. The river flows northeast near Ostra Vetere and Corinaldo before entering the Misa north of Ostra.

The ancient necropolis near the town also serves as an archaeological site, where a tomb thought to be associated with the ancient Picene culture was uncovered in 2018.
