= Elisabetta Maria Satellico =

Italian Roman Catholic nun

Blessed Elisabetta Maria Satellico O.S.C.

Religious
- Born: 31 December 1706; Venice, Republic of Venice
- Died: 8 November 1745 (aged 38); Ostra Vetere, Ancona, Papal States
- Venerated in: Roman Catholic Church
- Beatified: 10 October 1993, Saint Peter's Square, Vatican City by Pope John Paul II
- Feast: 8 November
- Attributes: Poor Clare habit

Elisabetta Maria Satellico (31 December 1706 – 8 November 1745) – in religious Maria Crocifissa – was an Italian Roman Catholic professed religious from the Poor Clares who served as her convent's abbess.

Her beatification was celebrated on 10 October 1993.

== Life ==
Elisabetta Maria Satellico was born in the Republic of Venice on 31 December 1706 to Piero Satellico and Lucia Mander. Satellico – and her parents as well – lived in the home of her priest maternal uncle who instilled in her a moral and cultural education.

Satellico was often frail during her childhood but made up for her poor health in her musical and singing abilities. She cultivated a deep religious faith as a child and was determined to enter the religious life at the earliest time possible as part of the Capuchin Poor Clares and she often said: "I want to become a nun and if I succeed I want to become a saint". She was a student at the Poor Clare convent at Ostra Vetere where she used the organ and sang songs.

The order received her into their ranks in Senigallia in 1720. She was later elected as the abbess of her convent in 1742. Due to her age the Bishop of Senigallia did not grant her permission to be vested in the habit though the new bishop Bartolomeo Castelli allowed her to do so on 13 May 1725; this enabled her to commence her novitiate until her profession which she made on 19 May 1726 in the name of "Maria Crocifissa" into the hands of the vicar general of the diocese. Her spiritual directors were Angelo Sandreani and Giovanni Battista Scaramelli (her first biographer).

Satellico died of tuberculosis on 8 November 1745 and she was buried at the Chiesa di Santa Lucia in Ostra Vetere.

== Beatification ==
The beatification process opened in an informative process that commenced on 18 August 1752 in the Diocese of Senigallia that was later suspended though resumed in 1826 under Pope Leo XII before stalling once more. Pope Pius X later resumed the cause in 1914 before his death. One more process followed this, as well as the approval of her writings on 12 April 1916, while the two previous processes received validation from the Congregation of Rites.

The beatification process commenced – on an official level – when she was titled as a Servant of God on 22 February 1806 under Pope Pius VII.

The postulation later submitted the Positio to the Congregation for the Causes of Saints decades later in 1985 which allowed for a team of theologians to approve the cause on 27 November 1990 and for the C.C.S. to follow suit on 9 April 1991. On 14 May 1991 she was proclaimed to be Venerable after Pope John Paul II confirmed that the late religious had led a life of heroic virtue.

The miracle needed for her beatification was investigated in a diocesan process in the Italian diocese of its origin and received the validation of the C.C.S. on 4 October 1991 while a medical board met and approved the healing to be a miracle on 1 April 1992; theologians followed on 9 October 1992 and the C.C.S. gave their approval to it as well on 12 January 1993. John Paul II provided the final approval needed on 2 April 1993 and beatified Satellico on 10 October 1993.
