= Diocese of Rimini =

Roman Catholic diocese in Italy

Diocese of Rimini Dioecesis Ariminensis

Catholic
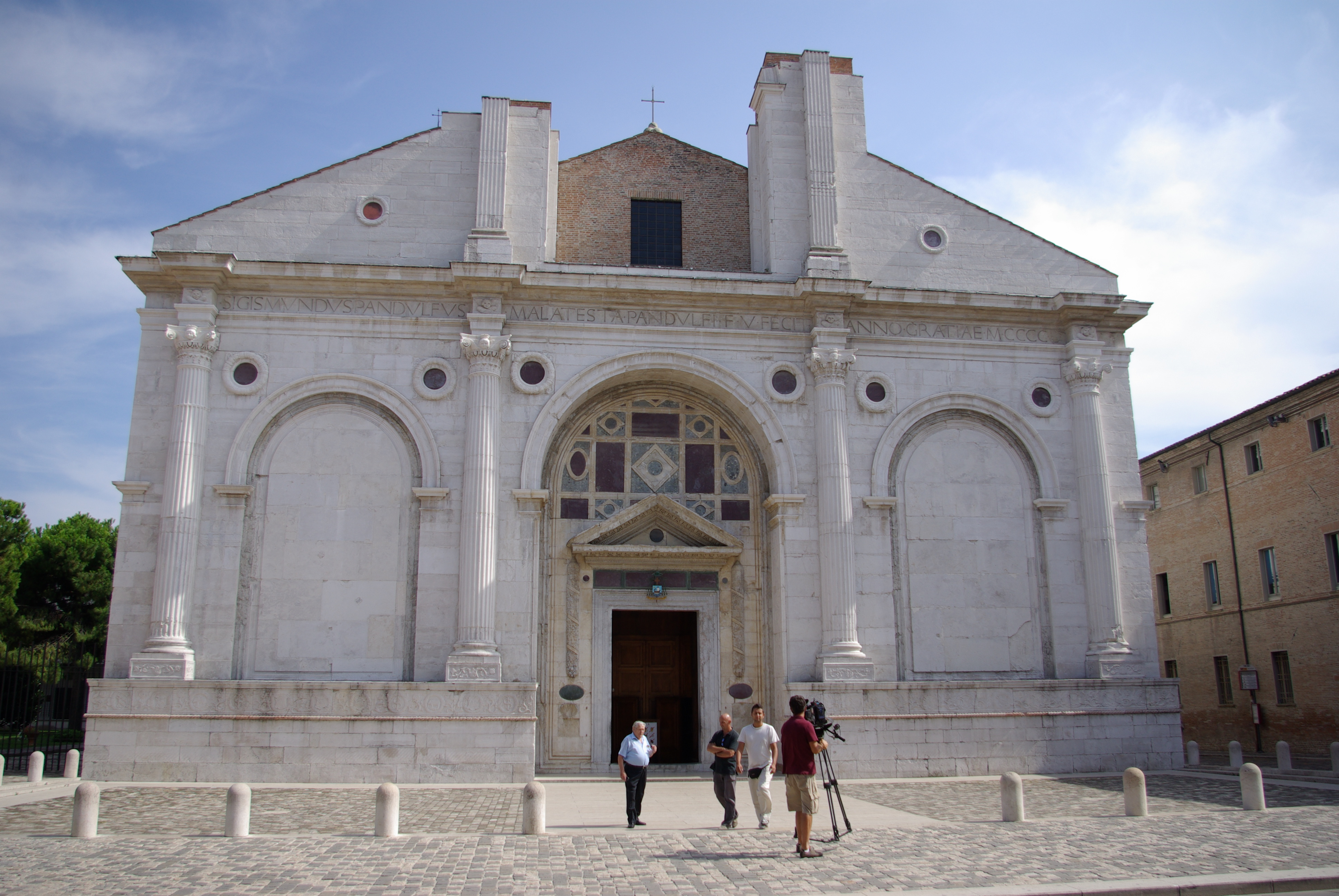
- Tempio Malatestiano Cathedral, Rimini

Location
- Country: Italy
- Ecclesiastical province: Ravenna-Cervia

Statistics
- Area: 781 km^{2} (302 sq mi)
- Population: Total; Catholics: (as of 2022); 358,500 (est.)▲; 285,800 (est)▼ (79%)
- Parishes: 143

Information
- Denomination: Catholic Church
- Sui iuris church: Latin Church
- Rite: Roman Rite
- Established: 3rd century
- Cathedral: Basilica Cattedrale di S. Colomba
- Secular priests: 136 (diocesan)▼35 (religious Orders)▼58 Permanent Deacons▲

Current leadership
- Pope: Leo XIV
- Bishop: Nicolò Anselmi

Map
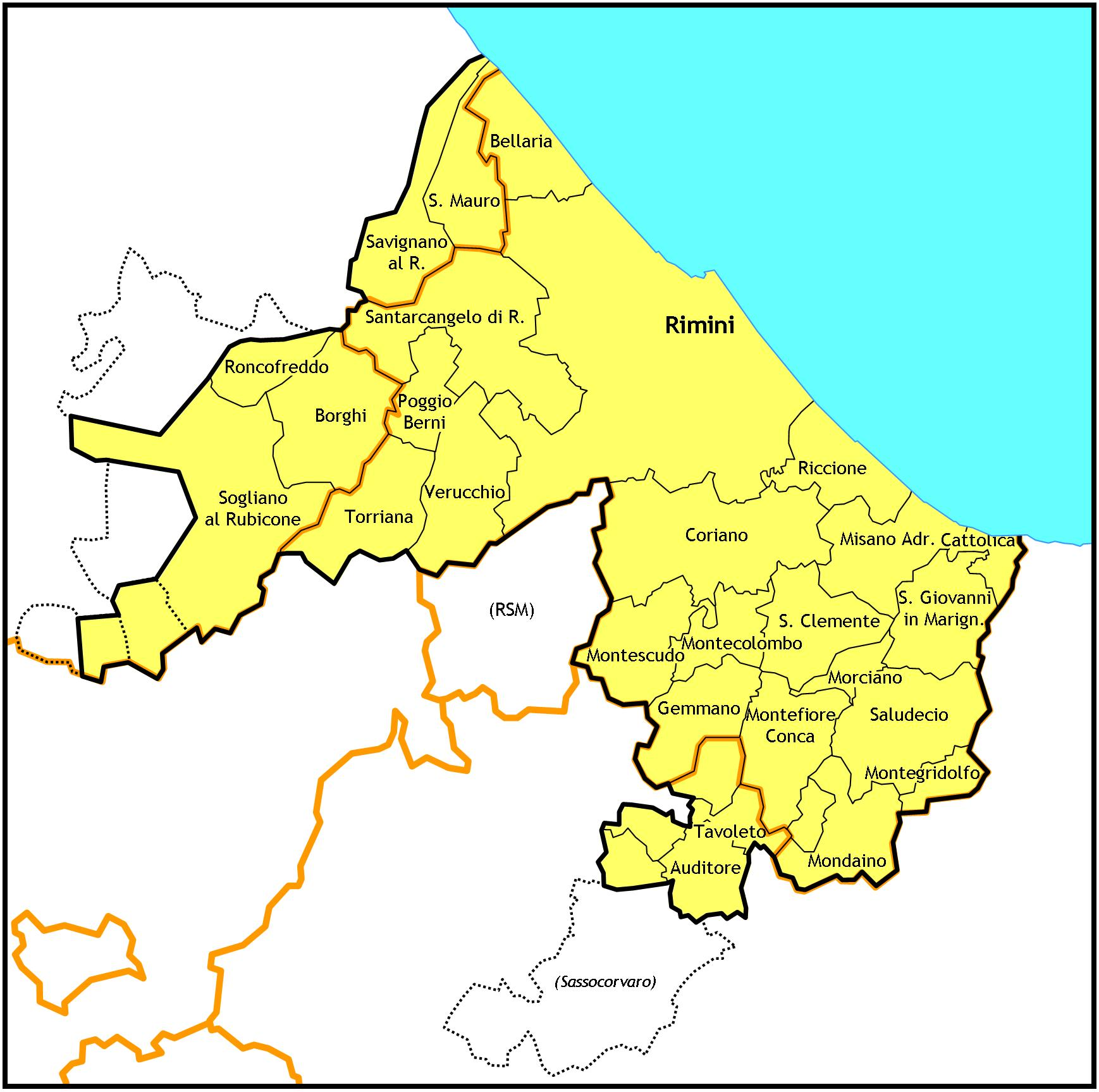

Website
- www.diocesi.rimini.it

The Diocese of Rimini (Latin: Dioecesis Ariminensis) is a Latin Church ecclesiastical territory or diocese of the Catholic Church in Emilia Romagna, Italy. From earliest times, it was a suffragan to the Holy See, despite repeated attempts by the Diocese of Ravenna to claim it as a suffragan diocese. Since 1604, however, it has been a suffragan of the Archdiocese of Ravenna-Cervia.

The episcopal see is in the cathedral of Rimini, Tempio Malatestiano, dedicated to the Holy Spirit (Sancta Columba). The cathedral was staffed and administered by a Chapter, composed of two dignities (not "dignitaries"), the Provost and the Archdeacon, and twelve Canons.

From 17 November 2022, Nicolò Anselmi is the 111º bishop of Rimini. He succeeded to Francesco Lambiasi who had reached the age of retirement.

== History ==
Rimini was probably evangelized from Ravenna. Among its traditional martyrs are: St. Innocentia and companions (who only became celebrated in the 15th century); Saints Juventinus, Facundinus, and companions; Saints Theodorus and Marinus. The see was probably established before the peace of Constantine.

Rimini's cathedral was dedicated to the Holy Spirit (Spirito Santo), and familiarly called S. Columba (the Holy Dove).

The dates assigned to Gaudentius of Rimini, considered the city's proto-bishop, are controversial. One tradition, represented in a martyrological Passio written between the 8th and 12th centuries, makes him an Ephesian who came to Rome c. 290, and was consecrated a bishop by Pope Damasus I (366–384). In another tradition, found in a codex of the 11th or 12th century, Christianity was first preached in Rimini by the priest Leo of Montefeltro and the deacon Marinus, in the time of Diocletian and Maximianus, who were followed by Gaudentius, who was consecrated to be the first bishop. Bishop Gaudentius was later put to death by the Arians for having excommunicated the priest Marcianus.

The famous Council of Rimini against Arianism was held in May 359, presided over by Bishop Restitutus of Carthage, with more than 400 Western bishops present, some eighty of them Arians. It was an assembly intended by the Emperor Constantius to meet paralleled by the eastern bishops' council of Seleucia, as a substitute for one general ecumenical council. Pope Liberius, however, was neither present nor represented by delegates. The Emperor was represented by his Prefect Taurus. The Synod unanimously approved the decisions of Nicaea, especially the use of the expression ousia, pronounced the anathema upon each separate point of Arianism, and (on 21 July 359) declared Bishops Ursacius, Valens, Germinius, and Caius (Auxentius and Demophilus) to be heretics and deposed.

Bishop Stephanus was one of fourteen bishops at Constantinople with Pope Vigilius. He signed Vigilius' excommunication and deposition of Bishop Theodorus (14 May 553).

Bishop Castor (591–599) was assigned a "Visitor", Bishop Leontius of Urbino, by Pope Gregory I, due to Castor's illness.

Bishop Agnellus (743) was perhaps the first bishop, according to sources in Rimini, to meddle with the magistrates of the city, on orders of the pope.

Peter Damiani, in his book, Liber Gratissimus, addressed to Archbishop Henricus of Ravenna, pointed out Bishop Ubertus (1005–1015) as a simoniac, who had paid a large sum of cash for his bishopric, and yet was revered and respectable.

Opizo was one of the bishops who installed and crowned the Antipope Clement III (Guiberto, 1075) in the Lateran in 1084; Ranieri II degli Uberti (1143) consecrated the ancient cathedral of St. Colomba; Alberigo (1153) made peace between Rimini and Cesena; Bonaventura Trissino founded the hospital of Santo Spirito; under Benno (1230) some pious ladies founded a hospital for the lepers, and themselves cared for the afflicted. At the end of the thirteenth century the Armenians received at Rimini a church and a hospital.

From November 1408, Pope Gregory XII resided at Rimini, as the guest of its Lord, Carlo Malatesta, to whom he had fled from Siena, to which he had fled from Lucca on 14 July 1408. In September 1409, having attempted without success to hold an ecumenical council at Cividale, in the diocese of Aquileia, he fled to Gaeta in the Kingdom of Naples, by ship. He was banished from the Kingdom of Naples on 31 October 1411, and again sought protection from Carlo Malatesta at Rimini. On 4 July 1415, he resigned as pope. He died at Recanati on 18 October 1417.

Giovanni Rosa united eleven hospitals of Rimini into one. Under Bishop Giulio Parisani (1549) the seminary was opened on 18 March 1568. Giambattista Castelli (1574–1583) promoted the Tridentine reforms and was nuncio at Paris, arriving there on 14 June 1581 and dying there on 27 August 1583.

On 14 December 1604, Pope Clement VIII, reversing the centuries long policy of his predecessors, removed the diocese of Rimini from the direct supervision of the Holy See, and assigned it as a suffragan of the archdiocese of Ravenna.

=== French occupation ===
In March 1796, Napoleon Bonaparte was appointed commanding general of the French invasion of northern Italy. His victory at Lodi, on 10 May 1796, placed him in control of the Piedmont and Lombardy, and by 30 May all of north Italy, except for Mantua, was in his hands. When the armies of the French Republic invaded the Romandiola in 1796, Bishop Vincenzo Ferretti (1779-1806) was forced to flee Rimini, with all his personal property. He sought refuge in San Marino, which, up until that time had been part of the papal states. But when the French general Berthier sent a letter ordering the magistrates to arrest and hand over Ferretti, the magistrates replied that they would do everything they could to carry out the French order. In the meantime, Ferretti had escaped.

In February 1797, French forces invaded the Romagna (Romandiola); the Papal States were forced to surrender, and, by the Treaty of Tolentino of 19 February 1797, handed over to the French the "Three Legations" (Bologna, Ferrara, and the Romandiola), including Rimini. The tree of liberty was planted at Rimini on 6 April 1797. By mid-April 1797, Bishop Ferretti was back in Rimini; there had been a violent disturbance in Rimini against the French on 13 April, and the bishop held a public banquet to placate the French officials. On 29 June 1797, Bonaparte decreed the establishment of the Cisalpine Republic, with its capital at Milan, to which Rimini was annexed. Rimini became the capital of the new French-style department called "Rubicone".

Laws based on those of the French Republic were immediately put in force. In July 1797, all the monasteries of Rimini were closed and the monks expelled. The mendicant orders (Franciscans, Dominicans, and Capuchins) were dissolved. On 20 December 1797, Bishop Ferretti published a pastoral letter in his diocese, declaring that God was the patron and protector of all liberty, and that God was as acquiescent in a monarchical as a democratic regime, provided that religious liberty was not interfered with. But in the spring of 1798, the Directory of the Cisalipine Republic ordered a large reduction in the number of public religious festivals.

Because of the damage caused by the earthquake of 1786, and subsequent tremors, the liturgical functions of the cathedral had to be transferred to the church of S. Giovanni Evangelista, popularly called S. Agostino. When Bishop Vincenzo Ferretti was in Milan to attend the coronation of Napoleon Bonaparte as King of Italy, he obtained the decree allowing for the transfer of the episcopal seat to the Tempio Malatestiano (officially known as S. Francesco).

=== Diocesan Synods ===
A diocesan synod was an irregularly held, but important, meeting of the bishop of a diocese and his clergy. Its purpose was (1) to proclaim generally the various decrees already issued by the bishop; (2) to discuss and ratify measures on which the bishop chose to consult with his clergy; (3) to publish statutes and decrees of the diocesan synod, of the provincial synod, and of the Holy See.

Bishop Giulio Parisani (1550–1574), who had attended the Council of Trent, held diocesan synods, in accordance with the decrees of the council, on 17 June 1566 and again on 28 October 1572. Bishop Giovanni Battista Castelli (1574–1583) held his first diocesan synod on 9 May 1577. On 19 June 1578, he held his second synod. He held his third diocesan synod on 16 June 1580. Bishop Giulio Cesare Salicini (1591–1606) presided over the diocesan synod of 10 June 1593; he held a second synod on 27 May 1596, and another on 9 May 1602.

Bishop Cipriano Pavoni, O.S.B. (1619-1627) held a diocesan synod in 1624. A diocesan synod was held by Bishop Angelo Cesi (1627-1646) on 14–16 May 1630. He held a second synod on 6–8 June 1639. Bishop Federico Sforza (1646-1656) presided over a diocesan synod on 18–20 May 1654. A diocesan synod was held by Bishop Honorato Honorati of Urbania at the order of Bishop Marco Galli (1659-1683) of Rimini on 4–6 October 1660. Galli was not present; he had been sent as ordinary papal nuncio to Cologne on 9 October 1659, and did not return until 1666. Bishop Honorati also conducted diocesan visitations in 1660 and 1666. Bishop Gallio conducted a synod personally on 17–19 December 1674. Cardinal Domenico Maria Corsi (1687-1697) held a diocesan synod in the cathedral in 1696. Cardinal Gianantonio Davia (1698-1726 ) held a synod on 19–21 May 1711.

== Bishops of Rimini ==
=== to 1200 ===
- Gaudentius of Rimini
- Stennius (attested 313)

...

- Eutychius ? (4th cent.)

...

- Joannes ? (496)

...

- Stephanus (attested 551, 553)

[Ocleatinus (591)]

- Castorius (attested 592–599)

Leontius (attested 596) Visitor?
Sebastianus (attested c. 596–599) Visitor

- Joannes (attested c. 599–603)

...

- Paulus (attested 679)

...

- Agnellus (attested 743)

...

- Tiberius (attested 769)

...

- Stephanus (attested 826)

...

- Joannes (attested 861)

...

- Delto (attested 876–881)

...
[Niccolo (887)]
...

- Joannes (attested 967–968)

...

- Hubertus (attested 996–998)
- Joannes (attested 998)

...

- Hubertus (attested 1009–1015)
- Monaldus (attested 1024–1036

...

- Humbertus (attested 1053–1065)

...

- Opizo (attested 1070–1086)

...

- Rainerius (attested 1122–1144)

...

- Albericus (attested 1171)
- Joselinus (attested 1179)
- Rufinus (1185–1192)
- Hugo (c. 1193–1203)

=== 1200 to 1500 ===
- Bonaventura Trissino (1204–1230)
- Benno (1230–1242)
- Gualterius (attested 1243)
- Ranerius (attested 1244)
- Ugolinus, O.P. (1245–1249)
- Algisius Rosatta (1250–1251)
- Jacobus (attested 1251–1261)
- Hugo (1263–1264)
- Ambrosius, O.P. (1265–1277)
- Guido de Caminate (1278–1300)
- Laurentius Balacco, O.P. (1300–1303)
- Fridericus Balacco (1303–1321)
- Franciscus Silvestri (1321–1323)
- Hieronymus, O.P. (1323–1328)
- Guido de Baisio (1329–1332)
- Alidusius (1332–1353)
- Andreas (1353–1362)
- Angelus Toris (1362–1366)
- Geraldus Gualdi (1366)
- Bernardus de Bonavalle (1366–1371)
- Ugolinus (1371–1373) Administrator
- Lialis Malatesta (1374–1400)
- Bartholomaeus Barbati (1400–1407)
- Bandellus Bandelli (1407–1416)
- Girolamo Leonardi, O.E.S.A. (1418–1435)
- Cristoforo di San Marcello (1435-1444)
- Bartolomeo Malatesta (1445–1448)
- Jacopo Vagnucci (1448–1449)
- Lodovico Grassi (1449–1450)
- Egidius de Carpi (1450–1472)
- Bartolomeo Coccapani (1472–1485)
- Joannes (1485–1488)
- Giacomo Passarelli (1488–1495)

Cardinal Oliviero Carafa (1495–1497) Administrator

- Vincenzo Carafa (1497–1505) Bishop-Elect

=== 1500 to 1800 ===
- Simon Bonadies (1511–1518)
- Fabio Cerri dell'Anguillara (1518-1528)

Franciotto Orsini (1528-1529) Administrator
Antonio Maria Ciocchi del Monte (1529-1529) Administrator

- Ascanio Parisani (1529-1549)
- Giulio Parisani (1550–1574)
- Giovanni Battista Castelli 1574–1583)
- Vincenzo Torfanini (1584–1591)
- Giulio Cesare Salicini 1591–1606)
- Berlinghiero Gessi (1606-1619)
- Cipriano Pavoni, O.S.B. (1619-1627)
- Angelo Cesi (1627-1646)
- Cardinal Federico Sforza (1646-1656)
- Tommaso Carpegna, C.R. (1656-1657)
- Cardinal Marco Galli (1659-1683)

Sede vacante (1683–1687)

- Cardinal Domenico Maria Corsi (1687-1697)
- Cardinal Gianantonio Davia (1698-1726)
- Cardinal Renato Massa (1726-1744)
- Alessandro Giuccioli (1745-1752)
- Marco Antonio Zollio (1752-1757)
- Giovanni Battista Stella (1757-1758)
- Ludovico Valenti (1759-1763)
- Francesco Castellini (1763-1777)
- Andrea Minucci (1777-1779)
- Vincenzo Ferretti (1779-1806)

=== Since 1800 ===
- Gualfardo Ridolfi (1807–1818)
- Giovanni Francesco Guerrieri (1819–1822)
- Giovanni Marchetti (1822–1824) Vicar Apostolic
- Ottavio Zollio (1824-1832)
- Francesco Gentilini (1833-1844)
- Salvatore Leziroli (1845-1860)

Sede vacante (1860-1863)

- Luigi Clementi (1863-1869)

Sede vacante (1869-1871)

- Luigi Paggi (1871–1876)
- Luigi Raffaele Zampetti (1876–1878)
- Francesco Battaglini (1879–1882)
- Alessandro Chiaruzzi (1882–1891)
- Domenico Fegatelli (1891–1900)
- Vincenzo Scozzoli (1900–1944)
- Luigi Santa, I.M.C. (1945–1953)
- Emilio Biancheri (1953–1976)
- Giovanni Locatelli (1977–1988)
- Mariano De Nicolò (1989–2007 retired)
- Francesco Lambiasi (2007–2022 retired)
- Nicolò Anselmi (2022- )

== See also ==
- Timeline of Rimini

== Bibliography ==
=== Episcopal lists ===
- Gams, Pius Bonifatius (1873). Series episcoporum Ecclesiae catholicae: quotquot innotuerunt a beato Petro apostolo. Ratisbon: Typis et Sumptibus Georgii Josephi Manz. pp. 721–723. (in Latin)
- Eubel, Conradus, ed. (1913). Hierarchia catholica. Vol. Tomus 1 (second ed.). Münster: Libreria Regensbergiana. (in Latin)
- Eubel, Conradus, ed. (1914). Hierarchia catholica. Vol. Tomus 2 (second ed.). Münster: Libreria Regensbergiana. (in Latin)
- Eubel, Conradus; Gulik, Guilelmus (1923). Hierarchia catholica. Vol. Tomus 3 (second ed.). Münster: Libreria Regensbergiana. (in Latin)
- Gauchat, Patritius (Patrice) (1935). Hierarchia catholica. Vol. Tomus IV (1592-1667). Münster: Libraria Regensbergiana. (in Latin)
- Ritzler, Remigius; Sefrin, Pirminus (1952). Hierarchia catholica medii et recentis aevi V (1667-1730). Patavii: Messagero di S. Antonio.
- Ritzler, Remigius; Sefrin, Pirminus (1958). Hierarchia catholica medii et recentis aevi. Vol. Tomus VI (1730-1799). Patavii: Messagero di S. Antonio. (in Latin)
- Ritzler, Remigius; Sefrin, Pirminus (1968). Hierarchia Catholica medii et recentioris aevi sive summorum pontificum, S. R. E. cardinalium, ecclesiarum antistitum series... A pontificatu Pii PP. VII (1800) usque ad pontificatum Gregorii PP. XVI (1846) (in Latin). Vol. VII. Monasterii: Libr. Regensburgiana.
- Remigius Ritzler; Pirminus Sefrin (1978). Hierarchia catholica Medii et recentioris aevi... A Pontificatu PII PP. IX (1846) usque ad Pontificatum Leonis PP. XIII (1903) (in Latin). Vol. VIII. Il Messaggero di S. Antonio.
- Pięta, Zenon (2002). Hierarchia catholica medii et recentioris aevi... A pontificatu Pii PP. X (1903) usque ad pontificatum Benedictii PP. XV (1922) (in Latin). Vol. IX. Padua: Messagero di San Antonio. ISBN 978-88-250-1000-8.

=== Studies ===
- Cappelletti, Giuseppei (1844). Le chiese d'Italia (in Italian). Vol. secondo. Venezia: Antonelli. pp. 369–435.
- Kehr, Paul Fridolin (1909). Italia pontificia Vol. IV (Berlin: Weidmann 1909), pp. 158–177. (in Latin)
- Lanzoni, Francesco (1927). Le diocesi d'Italia dalle origini al principio del secolo VII (an. 604), vol. II, Faenza 1927. (in Italian)
- Nardi, Luigi (1813). Cronotassi dei pastori della s. chiesa riminese Rimini: Tipi Albertiniani. (in Italian)
- Schwartz, Gerhard (1907). Die Besetzung der Bistümer Reichsitaliens unter den sächsischen und salischen Kaisern: mit den Listen der Bischöfe, 951-1122. Leipzig: B.G. Teubner. pp. 109–115. (in German)
- Tonini, Carlo (1895). Compendio della storia di Rimini (in Italian). Vol. Prima parte. Rimini.
- Tonini, Luigi (1856). Storia di Rimini: Rimini dal principio dell'era volgare all'anno MCC (in Italian). Vol. II. Rimini: Malvolti ed Ercolani.
- Tonini, Carlo (1896). Compendio della storia di Rimini: Dal 1500 al 1861 (in Italian). Vol. Parte seconda. Rimini: Tip. di E. Renzetti.
- Ughelli, Ferdinando; Coleti, Niccolo (1717). Italia sacra (in Latin). Vol. Tomus secundus. Venice: apud Sebastianum Coleti. pp. 409–441.
