= Saturninus of Arles =

French Roman Catholic bishop

Saturninus of Arles (bishop from 347 - 361) was a Gallo-Roman Arian bishop of Arles in the early 4th century who under Constantius II was Primate of Gaul. He is known for his opposition to Saint Hilary of Poitiers, bishop of Poitiers, at the Church Council of Arles of 353.

== Council of Arles ==
Arianism had been condemned at the First Council of Nicaea in 325. However, there were still a number of Arian bishops in the empire protected by the Arian Roman Emperor Constantius II. The Church Council of Arles of 353 was called by Pope Liberius to reconcile the remaining Arian bishops and it was in this setting that Saturninus came into opposition with Saint Hilary, bishop of Poitiers.

The acts of this council are lost, and nothing is known of what was said except what was reported about them by chroniclers who were hostile to Constantius. When the emperor threatened bishops who did not condemn the creed of Athanasius, all bishops in the Synod led by Saturninus acquiesced, except Paulinus of Trier, a friend of Athanasius who was then exiled to Phrygia in Asia Minor where he died in 358 of ill-treatment.

== Council of Rimini ==
In 359 Saturninus, with the support of the bishops of the Viennoise and the Narbonnaise, called the Council of Rimini, which defined an Arian dogma in opposition to the Nicene Creed.

When Constantius II died and was replaced by the pagan emperor Julian the Apostate, Hilary, with the exiled bishops, was allowed to return, whereupon he held the Council of Paris.

== First Council of Paris ==
The First Council of Paris was held in 361, under the presidency of Hilary of Poitiers, to condemn Arianism and its defenders, including Saturninus, whom Hilary deposed and excommunicated.
