= Gaudentius of Rimini =

Patron saint of Rimini, Italy

Saint Gaudentius of Rimini
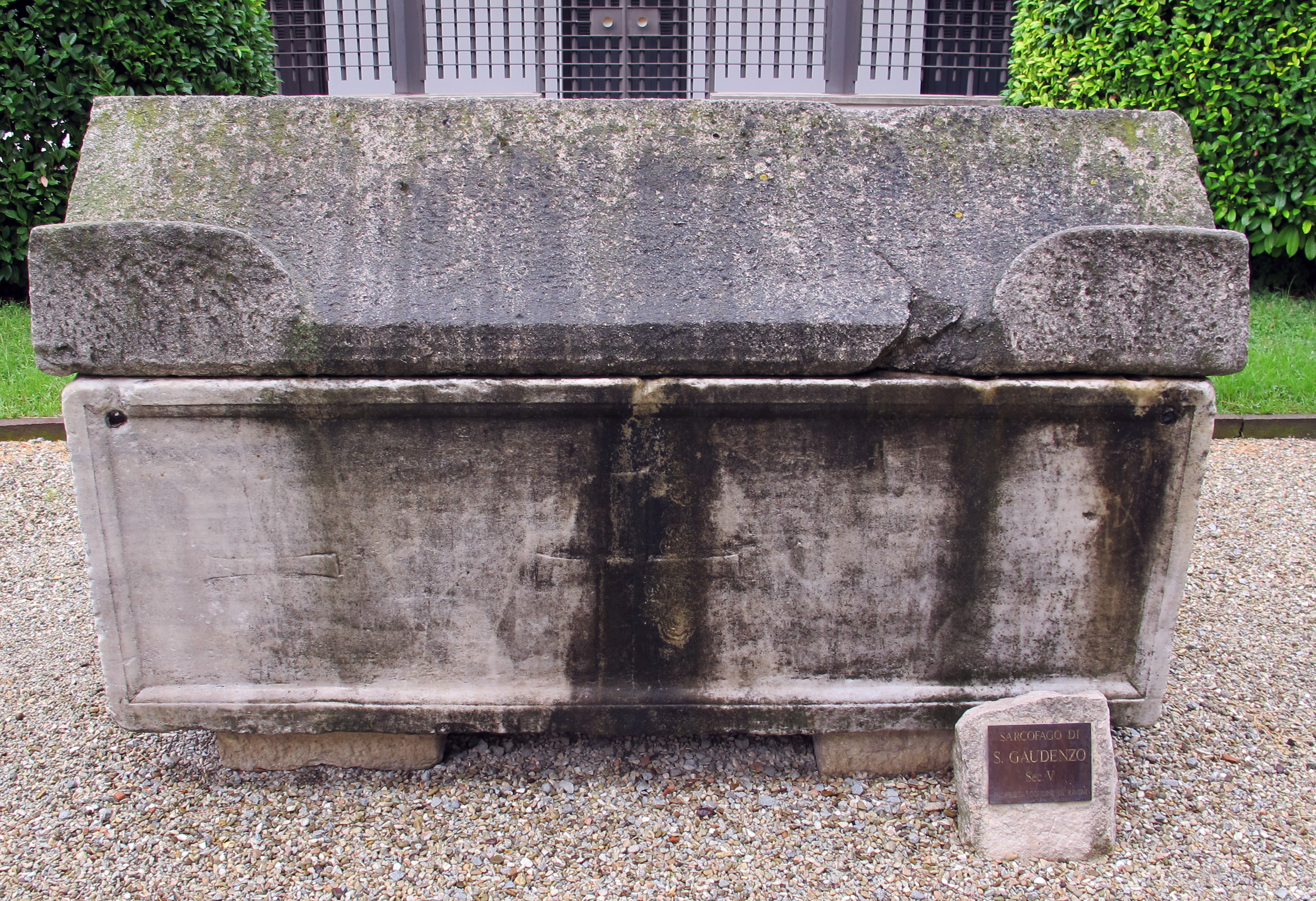
- Gaudentius' sarcophagus by the Tempio Malatestiano in Rimini, September 2013

Martyr
- Born: c. 280 AD; Ephesus, Roman Empire
- Died: 14 October 360; Rimini, Roman Empire
- Venerated in: Catholic Church; Eastern Orthodox Church
- Feast: 14 August (Garaguso); 14 October (elsewhere)
- Patronage: Rimini, Garaguso, Ostra, Montefabbri (Vallefoglia)

Gaudentius of Rimini (Italian: San Gaudenzo di Rimini, sometimes spelled Gaudenzio) (c. 280 AD – 14 October 360) was a bishop of Rimini, who is venerated as a martyred saint in the Catholic Church and Eastern Orthodox Church.

The accounts of Gaudentius' life vary. According to one account, Gaudentius was born in Ephesus in around 280 AD, consecrated as a bishop in Rome, and sent to preach in Ariminum (Rimini). He founded an early Christian community in the city, and ordained Saint Marinus as a deacon. In another account, in 359, he participated in the Council of Ariminum, and was killed by a mob on 14 October 360, either by supporters of Arianism or imperial guards.

As well as being the patron saint of Rimini, Gaudentius is celebrated in Ostra, in the Marche region, Garaguso, in Basilicata, both of which host some of his relics. In Rimini, his feast day of 14 October is celebrated as a holiday.

== Early life and ministry ==
The contents of Gaudentius' hagriographic tradition vary. He was born in Ephesus, in Asia Minor, in around 280 AD. Gaudentius came from a wealthy Christian family, allowing him to be educated. His parents were killed by Manichaeans, and Gaudentius fled to Rome, where he was baptised, became a priest, and was consecrated as a bishop.

Pope Sylvester I sent Gaudentius was to preach the Gospel in Ariminum (Rimini); he is considered to be the city's first proto-bishop. He founded a Christian community that met in a domus ecclesiae. During his episcopate, he ordained the stonemason Saint Marinus, who would found the Republic of San Marino, as a deacon. Some sources claim that Gaudentius also ordained Leo of Montefeltro, after whom San Leo is named, as priest.

Several miracles are attributed to Gaudentius during his life: that he exorcised a man possessed by the devil and that he transformed the waters of the Misa river in Sena Gallica (Senigallia) into wine for his travelling companions.

== Martyrdom ==
In one group of legends, in 359 AD, Gaudentius participated in the Council of Ariminum, called by Emperor Constantius II, where he condemned the Arian heresy. The council was called to reconcile Arius' supporters with his detractors. Constantius had visited Rimini in 357, and commissioned the praetorian prefect, Taurus, to prepare the city for the council; the location was likely chosen because local clergy were sympathetic to Arianism. The council was hosted in the city between May and October 359. Gaudentius was against Arianism.

Once it seemed certain that the Arian camp would lose, or to flee violence in the city, with seventeen other bishops, Gaudentius retreated to a nearby town, which tradition says was renamed Cattolica (lit. 'Catholic') after their retreat. On his return to Rimini, Gaudentius was arrested. On one account, he was charged with condemning Arianism; in another, his miracles led him to be accused of the deaths in close succession of two imperial troops. A mob snatched him from the hands of the city's magistrates: in one account, he was lynched or stoned to death by Arian's supporters; in another, he was stoned to death for perduellio.

Gaudentius was martyred on 14 October 360. He was killed in a marshy area south of the city's Arch of Augustus, which became known as Lacus Martyrum (Lake of the Martyr); it is believed to be the etymology of Via Lagomaggio and Rimini's eponymous suburb.

The account of Gaudentius' participation in the Council of Ariminum is considered inconsistent with earlier legends about his life, because another bishop in Rimini is attested as early as 313. A separate legend claims that Gaudentius fought a heretical priest known as Marciano, leading Gaudentius to flee to the bishop of Forlì. A similar tradition holds that Gaudentius was killed by soldiers of a consul, also named Marcianus, who denied the resurrection of the dead.

== Cult ==
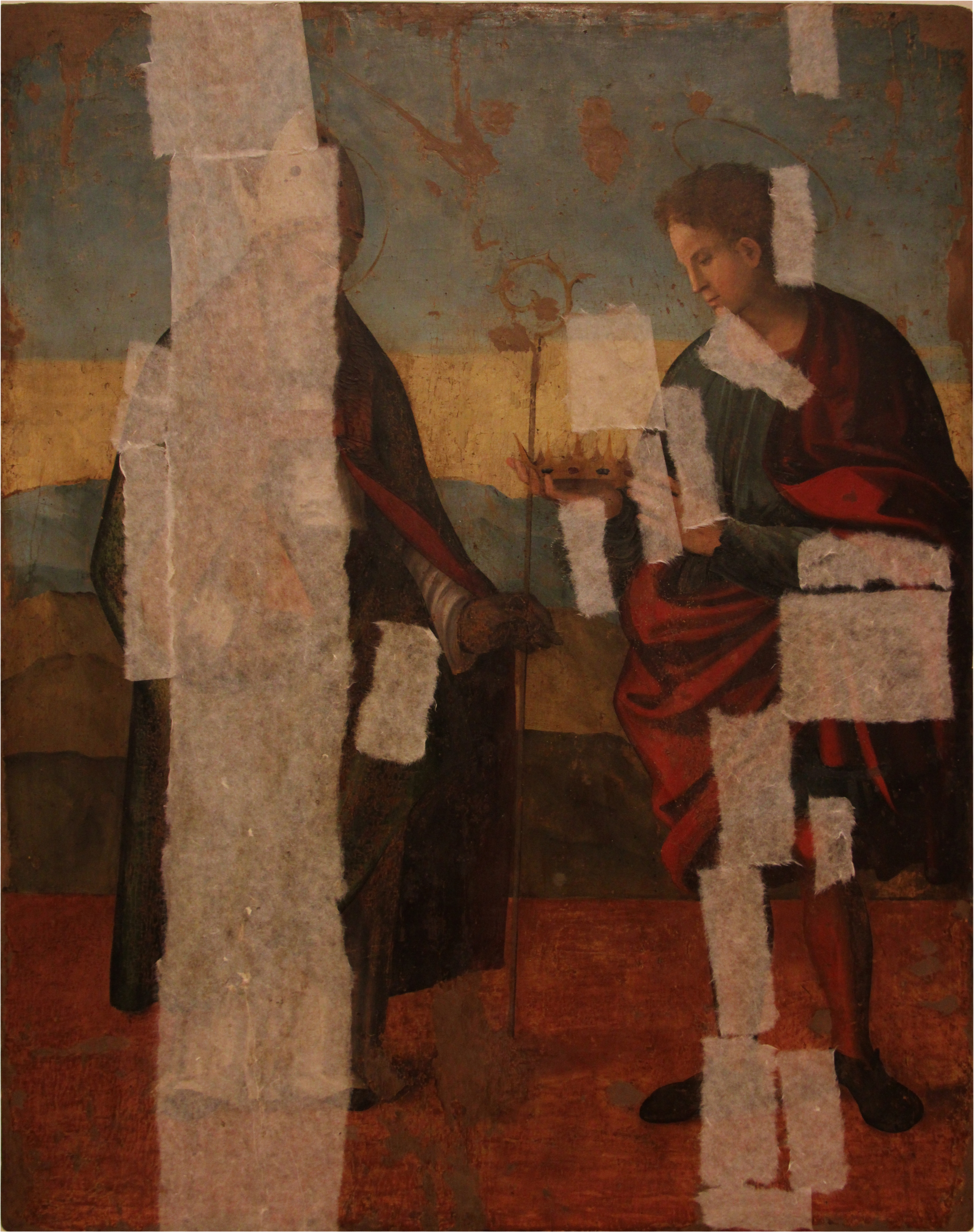
San Gaudenzio e San Giuliano by Benedetto Coda, c. 1500 – c. 1535

Since time immemorial, Gaudentius has been the patron saint of Rimini. In the Bavarian Code, a codex containing the church of Ravenna's investitures between the 8th and 10th centuries, Rimini's Arch of Augustus is called the Gate of Saint Gaudentius; the city's necropolis was outside the city walls here, with Gaudentius as its most famous burial. The site of the cemetery, which formerly housed a chapel and abbey, is now a sports centre adjacent to the Stadio Romeo Neri. A nearby street is named after Gaudentius.

Rimini's first cathedral, between the ancient Via Flaminia and the sea, is recorded in his dedication in the eleventh century. Rimini's medieval San Gaudenzo became one of the city's important and best-endowed abbeys; it was deconsecrated and sold under Napoleon.

Today, Gaudentius' feast day, 14 October, is celebrated annually in the city. It marks the start of the diocese's pastoral year, and is celebrated with a tombola, sports competitions, music concerts, and other cultural activities. Piada dei morti, a sweet focaccia topped with raisins, almonds, walnuts, and pine nuts, is typically tasted as part of the festivities, despite being proper to All Souls' Day.

Gaudentius is also the patron saint of Ostra, in the Marche region, Garaguso, in Basilicata, and Montefabbri, a hamlet of Vallefoglia, in the Marche. Both Ostra and Garaguso host relics of Gaudentius. In Garaguso, he is celebrated on 14 August not to interrupt the mid-October sowing season.

=== Reburial ===
Le glorie riminesi nella vita, e martirio di S. Gaudentio by the Giovanni Francesco Mainardi, printed in Rimini by Simbene Simbeni in 1659, provided one of the first written hagiographic accounts of Gaudentius and his devotional tradition.

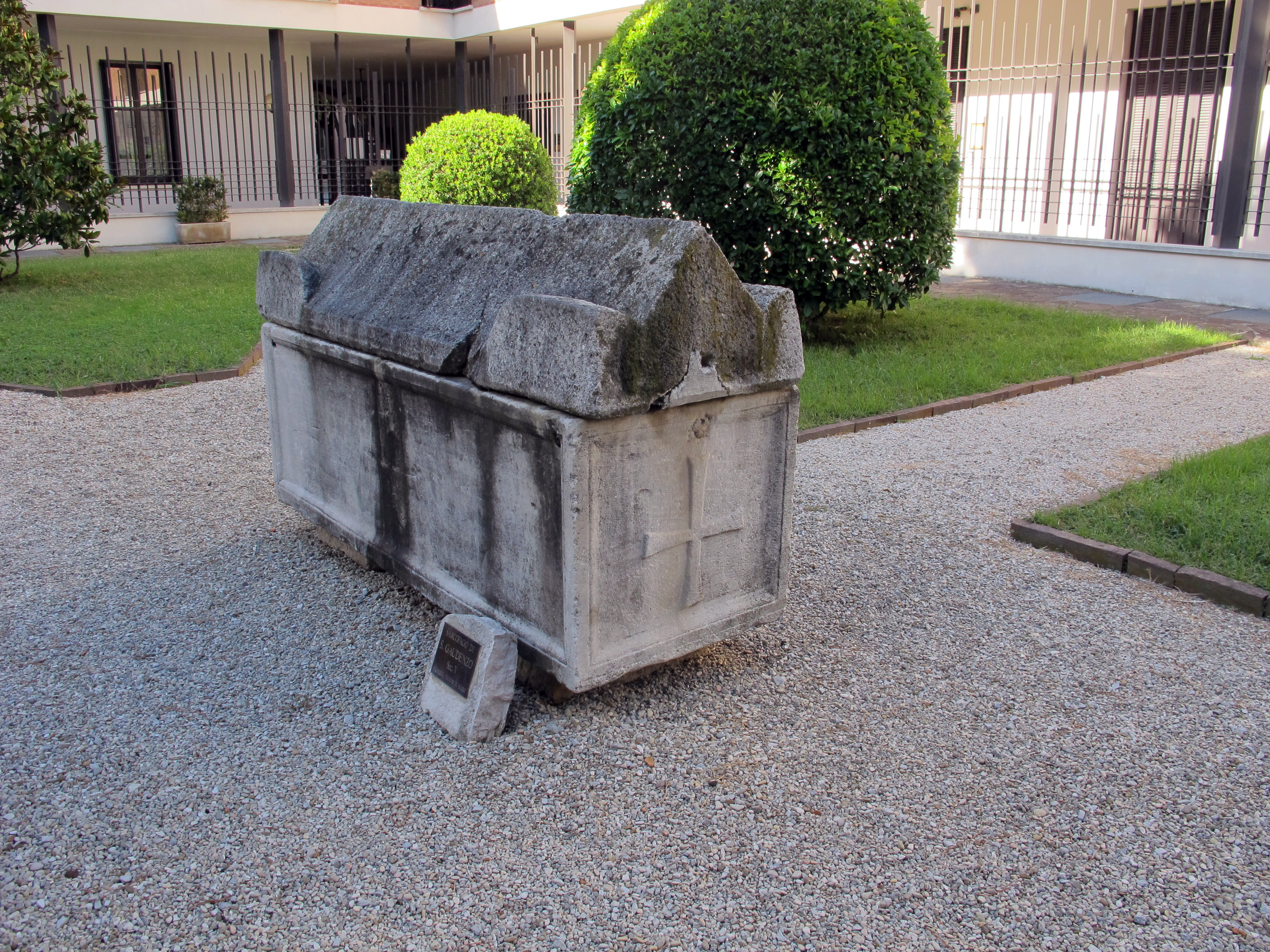
Gaudentius' sarcophagus in the diocesan courtyard, September 2013

Mainardi recorded than in 430, an angel instructed Abortina, a blind woman from Ravenna, to go to Rimini and warn the abbot of the Church of San Gaudenzo to give a worthy burial to the remains of saints Gaudentius, Valentino, and Vittore, who lay forgotten at the bottom of a well covered by a marble slab. The angel miraculously transported the woman to Rimini, and regained her sight once the remains of the saints were identified. Gaudentius was reburied in a sarcophagus, still extant in the courtyard of Rimini's Curia next to the Tempio Malatestiano. Pilgrims to Gaudentius' tomb included Amato Ronconi, a 13th-century saint from nearby Saludecio.

=== Relics ===
With the incursion of barbarian invaders, in 590, Theodelinda, Queen of the Lombards, did not consider Gaudentius' relics safe in Rimini. Gaudentius' remains, except his skull, were moved to Senigallia, where they were welcomed by the local bishop. The House of Malatesta placed the relics in a stone sarcophagus, now located in the chapter house of Senigallia Cathedral. An abbey complex dedicated to Gaudentius was founded in Senigallia's outskirts, where the remains were subsequently relocated.

By 1520, the abbey had fallen into ruin, and the remains were transported to the Montalboddo (modern-day Ostra), where they are still found today. In 1702, Cardinal Gaspare Carpegna donated a leg bone to the parish priest of St Nicholas of Myra in Garaguso, and in 1794, Fortunato Pinto, the bishop of Tricarico, donated an arm bone to the same parish.

In 1857, Pope Pius IX donated a silver reliquary to Rimini's Tempio Malatestiano to house Gaudentius' skull. Some of Gaudentius' relics are in the church of San Giovanni Battista, in Rimini's northern Borgo San Giovanni.

=== Depictions in art ===
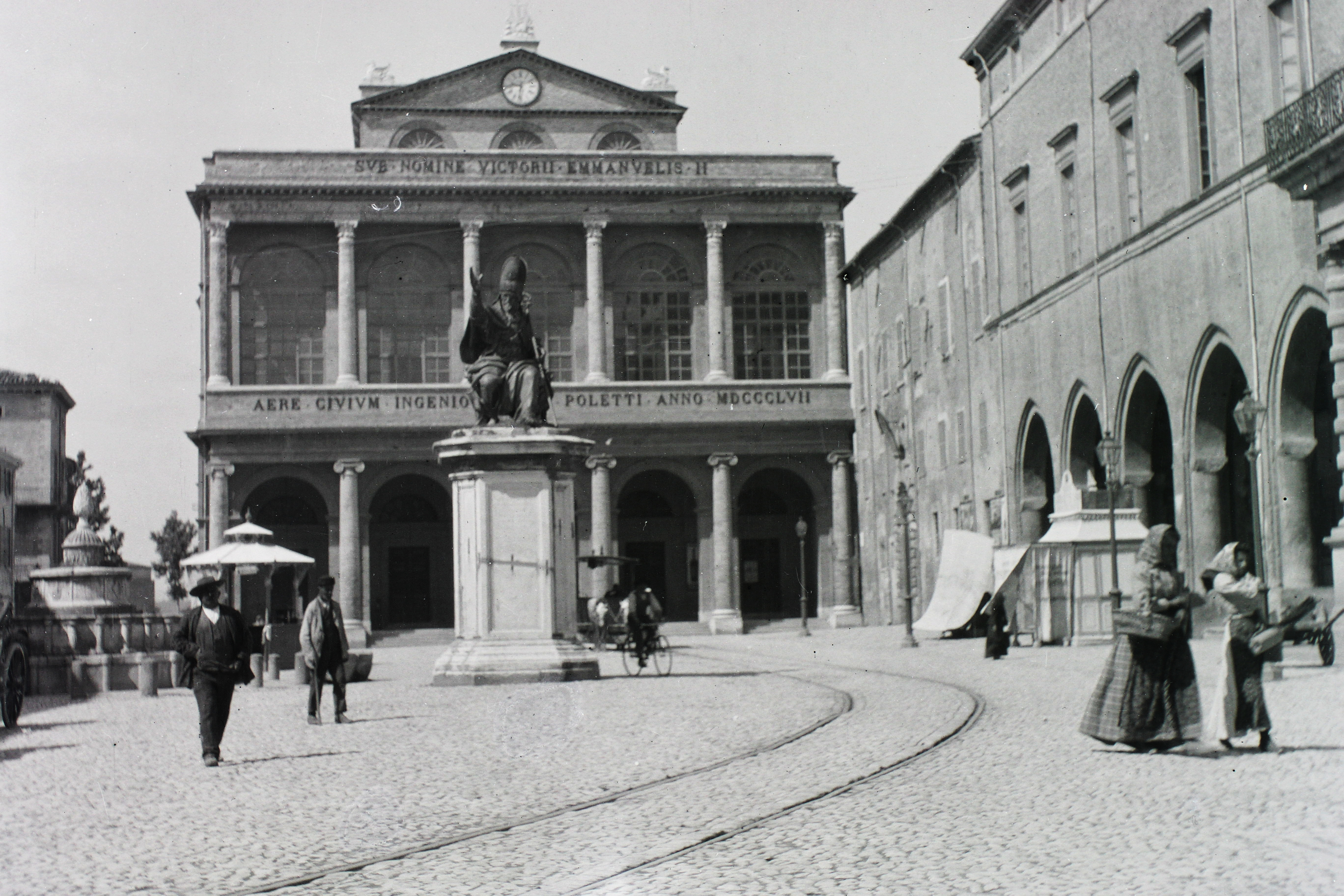
Rimini's Piazza Cavour in c. 1910, showing the statue to Pope Paul V in its 1797–1939 modification to Gaudentius in front of the Amintore Galli Theatre

Many popular devotional prints and engravings depicting Gaudentius date from the eighteenth century, including an engraving by Giacomo Zampa.

In 1797, the bronze sculpture in Rimini's Piazza Cavour, sculpted by Nicolas Cordier and Sebastian Sebastiani between 1611 and 1614 and dedicated to Pope Paul V, was modified to resemble Gaudentius, to save it from destruction by the Cisalpine Republic. The papal triregnum was swapped for a bishop's mitre, with the statue holding a crosier in its left hand and the palm of its right hand open. After the Rimini earthquake on 17 May 1916, Il Resto del Carlino reported: "The bronze statue of S. Gaudenzo in Piazza Cavour has moved from its base and the crosier has broken". The sculpture was restored to its original appearance by sculptor Filogenio Fabbri in 1939, restoring the three fingers of the right hand raised in an act of blessing, and the keys to the city in the left hand. Restoration in the winter of 2003–04 discovered that the triregnum had been engraved with 'Year XVI of the Fascist Era'.

Alessandro Bornacci's etching Il Conciabolo in Rimino (1820) depicts Gaudentius as part of the camp defending the Nicene faith at the Council of Ariminum, being attacked by imperial guards.
