= Hilary of Poitiers =

Bishop of Poitiers (c. 298 – c. 367)

Saint Hilary of Poitiers
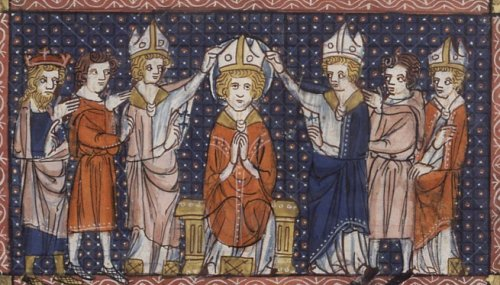
- The Ordination of Saint Hilary, from a 14th-century manuscript

Bishop and Doctor of the Church
- Born: c. 298; Pictavium, Gallia Aquitania, Roman Empire
- Died: c. 367 (aged c. 68–69); Pictavium, Septem Provinciae, Roman Empire
- Venerated in: Catholic Church; Eastern Orthodox Church; Anglican Communion; Lutheran Church; Oriental Orthodoxy
- Canonized: Pre-Congregation
- Feast: 13 January; 14 January (Byzantine Christianity; some local calendars and pre-1970 General Roman Calendar)
- Attributes: episcopal vestments, a mitre and crozier, and usually white and often long beard
- Influences: Origen, Athanasius

Hilary of Poitiers (Latin: Hilarius Pictaviensis; c. 298 – c. 367) was a Roman Christian prelate who served as Bishop of Poitiers. He was known for his opposition to Arianism and is venerated as a saint and Doctor of the Church.

== Early life ==
Hilary was born at Poitiers either at the end of the 3rd or beginning of the 4th century AD. His parents were pagans of distinction. He received a good education, which included a high level of Greek. He studied, later on, the Old and New Testament writings, with the result that he abandoned his Neoplatonism for Nicene Christianity, and with his wife and his daughter, traditionally known as Abra of Poitiers, were baptized and received into the Church.

Arianism was becoming popular among Christians in this era and this theological position was refuted by the bishops at the Council of Nicaea, under the sponsorship of the emperor Constantine the Great. There had been rigorous debates—even some violent disputes—between Trinitarians and Arians, leading up to the Council.

In 353, the Trinitarian Christians of Arles elected Hilary as bishop as the existing bishop, Saturninus of Arles, was an Arian. At the Council of Arles, the legates of Pope Liberius refused to condemn Arianism and considered formally opposing Athanasius of Alexandria, who was a strong advocate of Trinitarianism against Arianism. Hilary still managed to secure the local excommunication, by those of the Gallican hierarchy who were his allies, of Bishop Saturninus and two of his prominent supporters, Bishops Ursacius of Singidunum and Valens of Mursa.

About the same time, Hilary wrote to Emperor Constantius II a remonstrance against the persecutions by which the Arians had sought to crush their opponents (Ad Constantium Augustum liber primus, of which the most probable date is 355). Other historians refer to this first book to Constantius as the "Book Against Valens", of which only fragments are extant. His efforts did not succeed at first, for at the synod of Biterrae (Béziers), summoned by the emperor in 356 with the professed purpose of settling the longstanding dispute, an imperial rescript banished the new bishop, along with Rhodanus of Toulouse, to Phrygia, a stronghold of Arianism.

Hilary spent nearly four years in exile, although the reasons for this banishment remain obscure. The traditional explanation is that Hilary was exiled for refusing to subscribe to the condemnation of Athanasius and the Nicene faith. More recently several scholars have suggested that political opposition to Constantius and support of the usurper Claudius Silvanus may have led to Hilary's exile.

== In exile ==
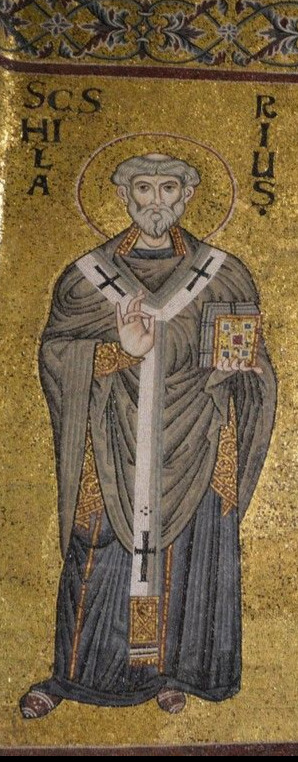
Mosaic from the Monreale Cathedral

While in Phrygia, however, he continued to govern his diocese, as well as writing two of the most important of his contributions to dogmatic and polemical theology: the De synodis or De fide Orientalium, an epistle addressed in 358 to the Semi-Arian bishops in Gaul, Germania and Britain, analyzing the views of the Eastern bishops on the Nicene controversy. In reviewing the professions of faith of the Oriental bishops in the Councils of Ancyra, Antioch, and Sirmium, he sought to show that sometimes the difference between certain doctrines and orthodox beliefs was rather in the words than in the ideas, which led to his counseling the bishops of the West to be more reserved in their condemnation.

The De trinitate libri XII, composed in 359 and 360, was the first successful expression in Latin of that Council's theological subtleties originally elaborated in Greek. Although some members of Hilary's own party thought the first had shown too great a forbearance towards the Arians, Hilary replied to their criticisms in the Apologetica ad reprehensores libri de synodis responsa.

In his classic introduction to the works of Hilary, Watson summarizes Hilary's points:

"They were the forerunners of Antichrist ... They bear themselves not as bishops of Christ but as priests of Antichrist. This is not random abuse, but sober recognition of the fact, stated by St. John, that there are many Antichrists. For these men assume the cloak of piety, and pretend to preach the Gospel, with the one object of inducing others to deny Christ. It was the misery and folly of the day that men endeavoured to promote the cause of God by human means and the favour of the world. Hilary asks bishops, who believe in their office, whether the Apostles had secular support when by their preaching they converted the greater part of mankind ..."
"The Church seeks for secular support, and in so doing insults Christ by the implication that His support is insufficient. She in her turn holds out the threat of exile and prison. It was her endurance of these that drew men to her; now she imposes her faith by violence. She craves for favours at the hand of her communicants; once it was her consecration that she braved the threatenings of persecutors. Bishops in exile spread the Faith; now it is she that exiles bishops. She boasts that the world loves her; the world's hatred was the evidence that she was Christ's ... The time of Antichrist, disguised as an angel of light, has come. The true Christ is hidden from almost every mind and heart. Antichrist is now obscuring the truth that he may assert falsehood hereafter."

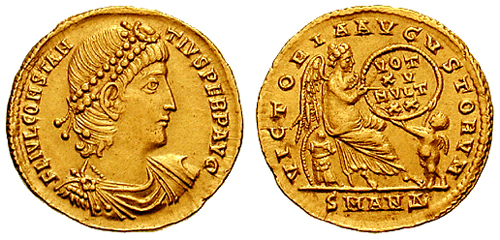
Constantius II coin

Hilary also attended several synods during his time in exile, including the council at Seleucia (359) which saw the triumph of the homoion party and the forbidding of all discussion of the divine substance. In 360, Hilary tried unsuccessfully to secure a personal audience with Constantius, as well as to address the council which met at Constantinople in 360. When this council ratified the decisions of Ariminum and Seleucia, Hilary responded with the bitter In Constantium, which attacked the Emperor Constantius as Antichrist and persecutor of orthodox Christians. Hilary's urgent and repeated requests for public debates with his opponents, especially with Ursacius and Valens, proved at last so inconvenient that he was sent back to his diocese, which he appears to have reached about 361, within a very short time of the accession of Emperor Julian.

== Later life ==
On returning to his diocese in 361, Hilary spent most of the first two or three years trying to persuade the local clergy that the homoion confession was merely a cover for traditional Arian subordinationism. Thus, a number of synods in Gaul condemned the creed promulgated at the Council of Ariminum (359).

In about 360 or 361, with Hilary's encouragement, Martin, the future bishop of Tours, founded a monastery at Ligugé in his diocese.

In 364, Hilary extended his efforts once more beyond Gaul. He impeached Auxentius, bishop of Milan, a man high in the imperial favour, as heterodox. Emperor Valentinian I accordingly summoned Hilary to Milan to there maintain his charges. However, the supposed heretic gave satisfactory answers to all the questions proposed. Hilary denounced Auxentius as a hypocrite as he had been ignominiously expelled from Milan. Upon returning home, Hilary in 365, published the Contra Arianos vel Auxentium Mediolanensem liber, describing his unsuccessful efforts against Auxentius. He also, perhaps at a somewhat earlier date, published the Contra Constantium Augustum liber, accusing the deceased emperor as having been the Antichrist, a rebel against God, "a tyrant whose sole object had been to make a gift to the devil of that world for which Christ had suffered."

According to Jerome, Hilary died in Poitiers in 367.

== Writings ==
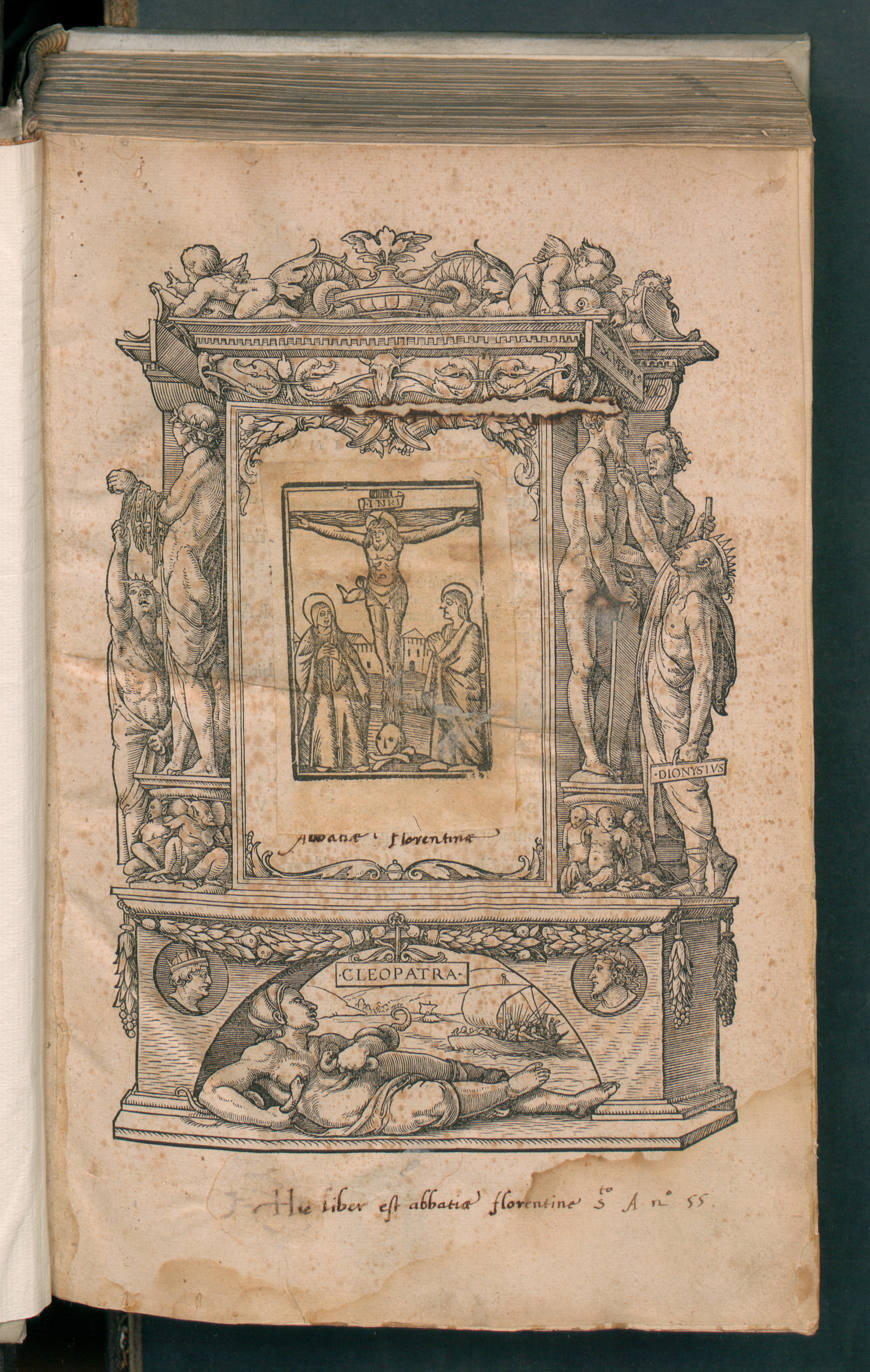
Opera omnia (1523)

While Hilary closely followed the two great Alexandrians, Origen and Athanasius, in exegesis and Christology, respectively, his work shows many traces of vigorous independent thought.

=== Exegetical ===
Among Hilary's earliest writings, completed some time before his exile in 356, is his Commentarius in Evangelium Matthaei, an allegorical exegesis of the first Gospel. This is the first Latin commentary on Matthew to have survived in its entirety. Hilary's commentary was strongly influenced by Tertullian and Cyprian, and made use of several classical writers, including Cicero, Quintilian, Pliny and the Roman historians.

Hilary's expositions of the Psalms, Tractatus super Psalmos, largely follow Origen, and were composed some time after Hilary returned from exile in 360. Since Jerome found the work incomplete, no one knows whether Hilary originally commented on the whole Psalter. Now extant are the commentaries on Psalms 1, 2, 9, 13, 14, 51–69, 91, and 118–150.

The third surviving exegetical writing by Hilary is the Tractatus mysteriorum, preserved in a single manuscript first published in 1887.

Because Augustine cites part of the commentary on Romans as by "Sanctus Hilarius" it has been ascribed by various critics at different times to almost every known Hilary.

=== Theological ===
Hilary's major theological work was the twelve books now known as De Trinitate. This was composed largely during his exile, though perhaps not completed until his return to Gaul in 360.

Another important work is De synodis, written early in 359 in preparation for the councils of Ariminium and Seleucia.

=== Historical works and hymns ===
Various writings comprise Hilary's historical works. These include the Liber II ad Constantium imperatorem, the Liber in Constantium inperatorem, Contra Arianos vel Auxentium Mediolanensem liber, and the various documents relating to the Arian controversy in Fragmenta historica.

Some consider Hilary as the first Latin Christian hymn writer, because Jerome said Hilary produced a liber hymnorum. Three hymns are attributed to him, though none are indisputable.

== Reputation and veneration ==
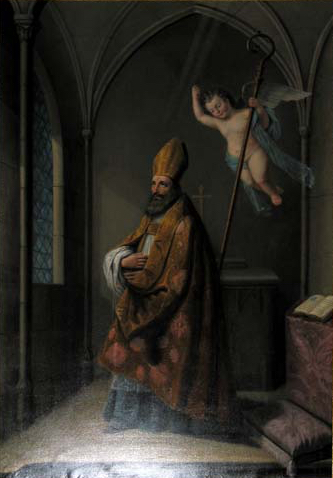
Saint Hilaire, depicted by Pierre-Floréal Crémière (1846)

Hilary is the pre-eminent Latin writer of the 4th century (before Ambrose). Augustine of Hippo called him "the illustrious doctor of the churches", and his works continued to be highly influential in later centuries. Venantius Fortunatus wrote a vita of Hilary by 550, but few now consider it reliable. More trustworthy are the notices in Saint Jerome (De vir. illus. 100), Sulpicius Severus (Chron. ii. 39–45) and in Hilary's own writings. Pope Pius IX formally recognized him as a Doctor of the Church in 1851.

In the Roman calendar of saints, Hilary's feast day is on 13 January, 14 January in the pre-1970 form of the calendar. The spring terms of the English and Irish law courts and Oxford and Dublin universities are called the Hilary term since they begin on approximately this date. Some consider Saint Hilary of Poitiers the patron saint of lawyers.

Hilary is remembered in the Anglican Communion with a lesser festival on 13 January.

=== Iconography ===
From his writing, Hilary's symbol came to be three books and a quill pen.

=== Dedications ===
Sulpicius Severus' Vita Sancti Martini led to a cult of Saint Hilary as well as of Martin of Tours which spread early to western Britain. The villages of St Hilary in Cornwall and Glamorgan and that of Llanilar in Ceredigion bear his name.

In France most dedications to Saint Hilary are styled "Saint-Hilaire" and lie west (and north) of the Massif Central; the cult in this region eventually extended to Canada.

In northwest Italy the church of Sant'Ilario at Casale Monferrato was dedicated to Hilary as early as 380.

In southern Spain the feast of San Hilario is celebrated in the village of Comares with a Mass, a procession and local Verdiales dances.

In Wales the village St Hilary has a church allegedly dedicated to St Hilary, from which the village is named.

== See also ==
- Paulinus of Nola
- Tiberianus
- Trochaic septenarius

== Bibliography ==
- Carl Beckwith, Hilary of Poitiers on the Trinity: From De Fide to De Trinitate (New York and Oxford, 2009).
- J. Doignon, Hilaire de Poitiers avant l'exil. Recherches sur la naissance, l'enseignementet l'épreuve d'une foi épiscopale en Gaule au milieu du IVé siècle, EAA, Paris 1971.
- Hunter, David G. (2010). "Fourth-century Latin writers". In Young, Frances; Ayres, Lewis; Young, Andrew (eds.). The Cambridge History of Early Christian Literature.
- Rondeau, Marie Josèphe (1962). "Remarques sur l'anthropologie de saint Hilaire". Studia Patristica. 6 (Papers presented to the Third International Conference on Patristic Studies held at Christ Church, Oxford, 1959, Part IV Theologica, Augustiniana, ed. F. L. Cross). Berlin: Akademie-Verlag: 197–210.
- P.T. Wild, The divinization of man according to Saint Hilary of Poitiers, Mundelein, Illinois 1955.
- Weedman, Mark (2007). The Trinitarian Theology of Hilary of Poitiers. Leiden-Boston: Brill. ISBN 978-9004162242.
- Alberto Gibilaro, Il Liber hymnorum di Ilario di Poitiers. Introduzione, edizione, traduzione e commento, Milano, Vita e Pensiero, 2023, ISBN 978-88-343-5533-6
