= Puerto Rico Commission on Public Service =

Regulatory body in Puerto Rico

The Puerto Rico Commission on Public Service — Spanish: Comisión de Servicio Público (CSP) — is one of Puerto Rico's oldest regulatory bodies whose jurisdiction has changed over the years. The CSP currently regulates the retail sale of natural gas, trucking, and jitneys, among other regulatory functions.

== History ==
Adolfo L. Monserrate Anselmi served at one time as Associate Commissioner along with Rafael Hernández Colón.

The multi-member PSC was headed by Roberto Maldonado until December 31, 2008. Governor Luis Fortuño appointed María T. Fullana as chairwoman of the PSC on January 4, 2009.
