= Leo of Montefeltro =

Roman bishop of Montefeltro

Saint Leo of Montefeltro (c. 275–366) otherwise Leone of Montefeltro (Italian: San Leo di Montefeltro, San Leone di Montefeltro) was the first bishop of Montefeltro from 301. He is traditionally held to have been in origin a stonecutter from Dalmatia. He is venerated as a saint by the Roman Catholic church. His feast day is 1 August.

Some sources claim that Leo was ordained as priest by Gaudentius of Rimini, who ordained Saint Marinus as deacon.
