= Nicolò Anselmi =

Italian Catholic Bishop (born 1961)

His Excellency, The Most Reverend Nicolò Anselmi
- Bishop of Rimini
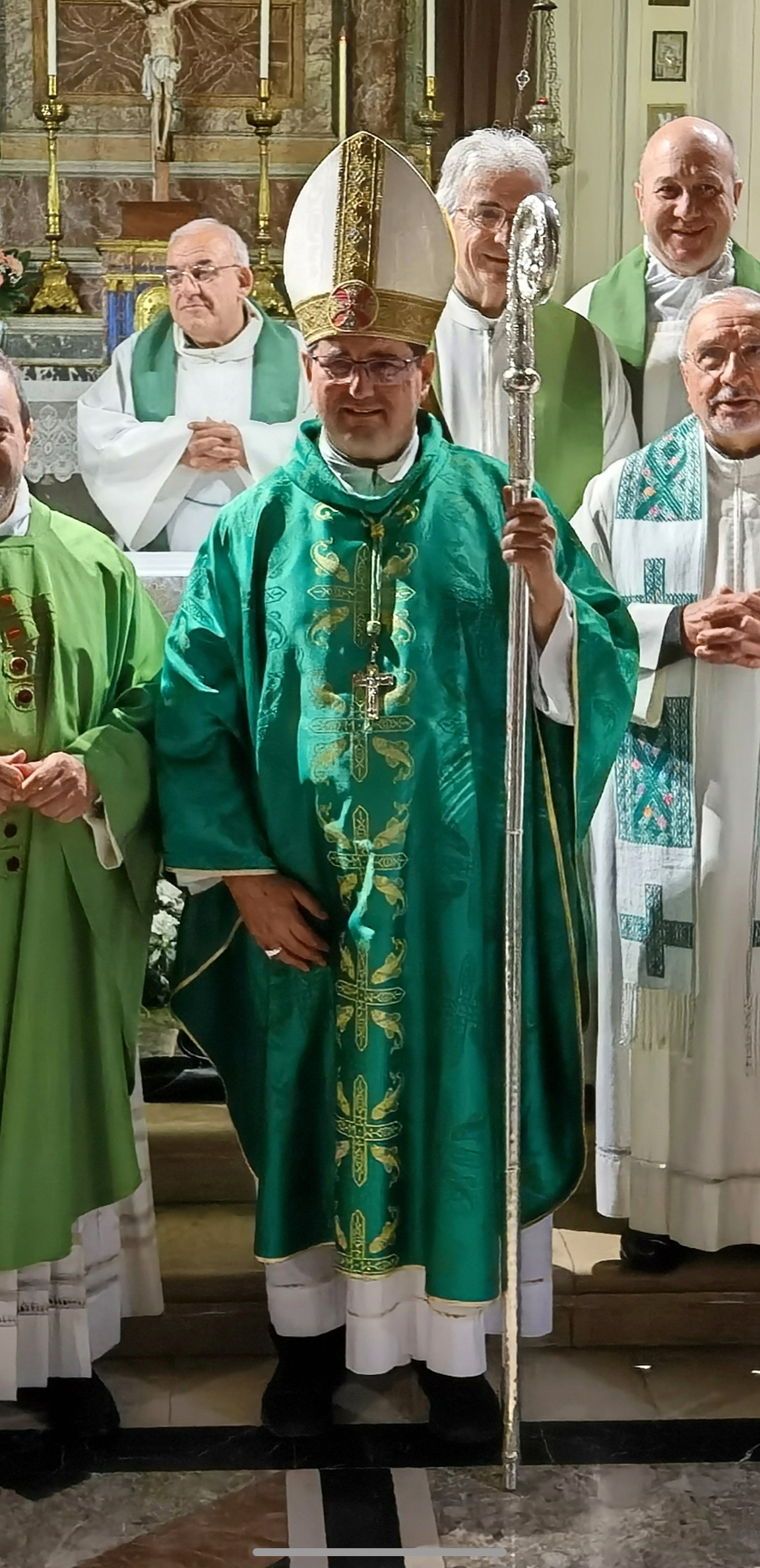
- Nicolò Anselmi in 2023
- Church: Roman Catholic Church
- Diocese: Diocese of Rimini
- See: Rimini
- Appointed: 17 November 2022
- Predecessor: Francesco Lambiasi
- Previous posts: 2015-2022:Auxiliary Bishop of Genoa; 2015-2022: Titular bishop of Utica; 2007-2012: Head of the Pastoral Service for the Youth of the Episcopal Conference of Italy

Orders
- Ordination: 9 May 1992 by Giovanni Canestri
- Consecration: 8 February 2003 by Angelo Bagnasco

Personal details
- Born: Nicolò Anselmi; 9 May 1961 (age 65) Genoa, Italy
- Denomination: Roman Catholic
- Parents: Cesare Anselmi, Stefana Pallavicini
- Education: Mechanical Engineer, Theologian
- Alma mater: Università degli Studi di Genova; Facoltà teologica dell'Italia settentrionale
- Motto: Ut unum sint ("So that they may be one")
- Coat of arms

Nicolò Anselmi (Genoa, 9 May 1961) is an Italian prelate of the Catholic Church who has served as the bishop of Rimini in Northern Italy since 17 November 2022. He became a priest in 1992. From 2007 to 2012, he was head of the Pastoral Service for the Youth of the Episcopal Conference of Italy. He returned to Genoa in 2012 to be pastor of the Parish of Santa Maria delle Vigne parish. Consecrated in 2015 as auxiliary bishop of Genoa, he remained a parish priest alongside his responsibilities as a bishop, until his move to Rimini in 2022.

Styles of Nicolò Anselmi
- Reference style: The Most Reverend
- Spoken style: Your Excellency
- Religious style: Bishop

== Biography ==
=== Early years ===
He was born in Genoa on 9 May 1961, the son of Cesare and Stefana Pallavicini. He was raised in the parish of San Pietro Apostolo in Quinto al Mare and received his Catholic formation from Domenico Calcagno, later a cardinal, at the Oratorio di Sant’Erasmo. Very active in the life of the parish, he served in multiple ways, including as a Scout leader (AGESCI). He also visited the nearby parish of San Siro in Nervi, where he received spiritual guidance towards his priestly vocation from Francesco Macciò.

After obtaining his secondary school diploma, he graduated in Mechanical Engineering at the Università degli Studi di Genova in 1985. One year later, he entered the seminary in Genoa and obtained a bachelor's degree in theology from the Facoltà teologica dell'Italia settentrionale.

=== Priesthood ===
On 9 May 1992, he was ordained a priest by Cardinal Giovanni Canestri in the parish church of San Pietro Apostolo in Quinto al Mare. He served as vice-pastor in the parish of San Pietro e Bernardo della Foce from 1992 to 1996, and as administrator of the parish of San Giovanni Bosco della Rimessa from 2001 to 2005.

At the same time, over the years, he was professor of religion at various secondary schools and assumed increasing responsibilities within the pastoral service to the youth. From 1994 to 2007, he led the pastoral service for the youth of the Archdiocese of Genoa. From 1997 to 2007, he was led the pastoral service for the youth of the Ecclesiastical Region Liguria. In 2007, he was made head of the Pastoral Service for the Youth of the Episcopal Conference of Italy, with full-time nation-wide accountability.

He returned to Genoa in 2012 as delegate for the Pastoral Care of Youth, Sports and University, and as pastor of the parish church of Santa Maria delle Vigne in the historical center of Genoa.

=== Auxiliary bishop of Genoa ===
On 10 January 2015, Pope Francis appointed him as titular bishop of Utica and auxiliary bishop of Genoa. He was consecrated in the Cathedral of Genoa by Cardinal Angelo Bagnasco on 8 February 2015. The co-consecrators were Cardinal Domenico Calcagno, President of the Administration of the Patrimony of the Apostolic See, and Alberto Tanasini, Bishop of Chiavari.

After his consecration, Bagnasco appointed him vicar general of the Archdiocese. He remained parish priest of Santa Maria delle Vigne. He was reconfirmed in both roles by the incoming archbishop of Genoa Marco Tasca on 16 July 2020.

=== Bishop of Rimini ===
On 17 November 2022, Pope Francis appointed him bishop of the Rimini. On 22 January 2023, he was installed in the Cathedral of Saint Columba, known as Tempio Malatestiano.

Anselmi is active within the Episcopal Conference of Italy as secretary of the Episcopal Commission for the Family, Youth and Life.

== Honors ==
Chaplain of His Holiness - ribbon for ordinary uniform

Chaplain of His Holiness
— 23 January 2012
