= Humberto Monserrate Anselmi =

Puerto Rican agronomist engineer

- Born: April 6, 1921; Santa Isabel, Puerto Rico
- Died: May 02, 1989 (71); San Juan, Puerto Rico
- Occupation: agronomist

Humberto Alfonso Monserrate Anselmi (1917–1989) was an American agronomist engineer of Puerto Rican descent.

Anselmi was a founding member and former president of the Instituto De Evaluadores de Puerto Rico from 1964 to 1965.

Anselmi was the son of Manuel Martín Monserrate Febo and María Anselmi Rodríguez, his brother was Adolfo L. Monserrate Anselmi By 1949 he was Chief of the Office Public Works Progress Office of Puerto Rico. He was nominated president of the Phi Sigma Alpha fraternity on four occasions.

He died on May 2, 1989, at age 71 and was buried at Buxeda Memorial Park in Río Piedras, Puerto Rico.

== See also ==
- List of Puerto Ricans
