= Ostra, Marche =

Ostra
- Comune
- Comune di Ostra
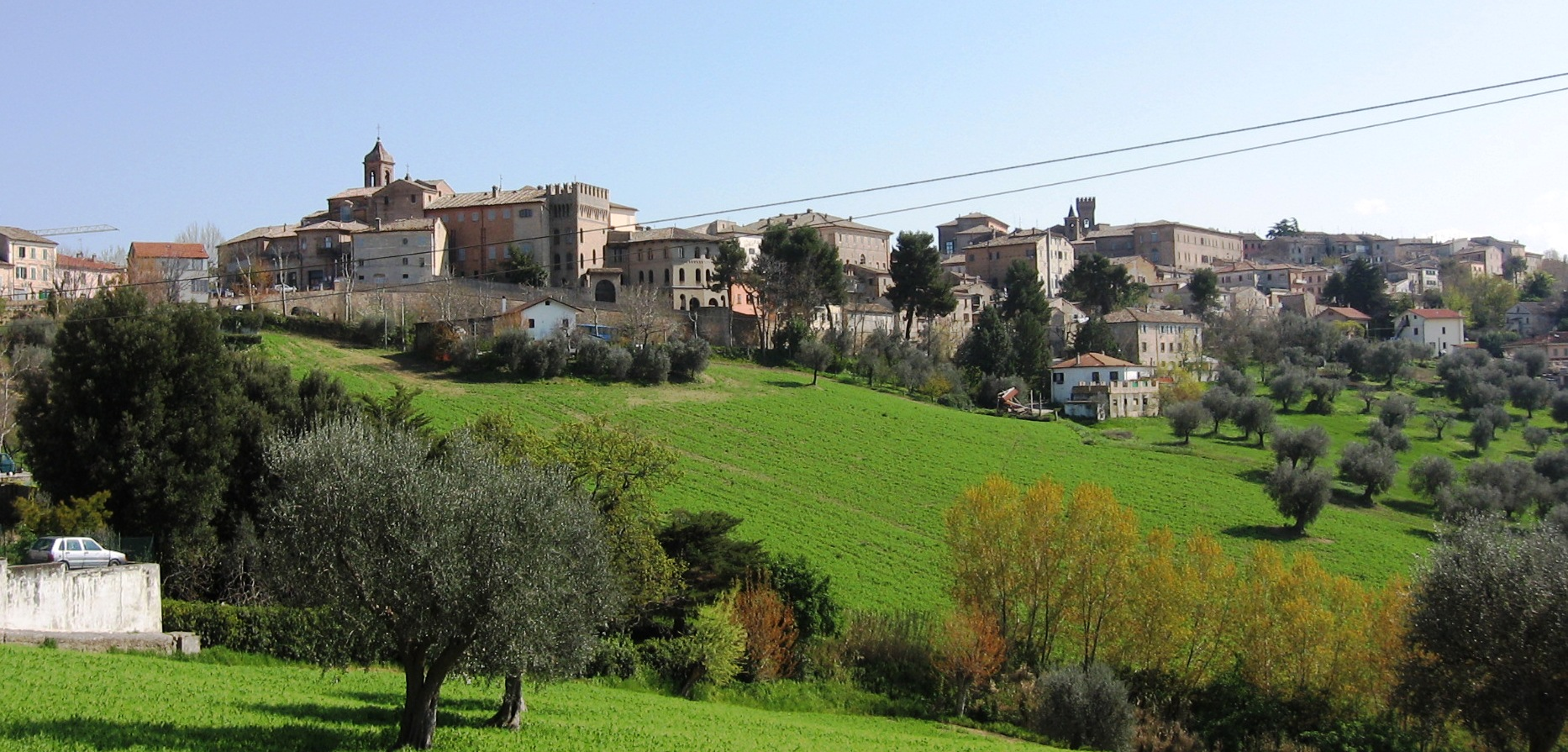

- Coat of arms

- Location within Italy Location within Marche
- Coordinates: 43°36′53″N 13°9′33″E
- Country: Italy
- Region: Marche
- Province: Ancona (AN)
- Frazioni: Pianello, Casine, Vaccarile

Government
  - Mayor: Massimo Olivetti

Area
  - Total: 46.59 km^{2} (17.99 sq mi)
- Elevation: 188 m (617 ft)

Population (28 February 2009)
  - Total: 6,718
  - Density: 144.2/km^{2} (373.5/sq mi)
- Demonym: Ostrensi
- Time zone: UTC+1 (CET)
  - Summer (DST): UTC+2 (CEST)
- Postal code: 60010
- Dialing code: 071
- Patron saint: Gaudentius of Rimini
- Saint day: October 14
- Website: Official website

Ostra is a town and comune in the Marche, central Italy, near the modern Ostra Vetere, south-east of Senigallia.

The modern town is founded near the site of ancient Ostra, a Roman settlement. Its name was later changed to Montalboddo, and reverted to Ostra in 1881.

== Geography ==
Modern Ostra lies on a hill over the Misa river valley. It is the most important town in the valley upstream from Senigallia, lying 14 kilometres (9 mi) from the Adriatic coast. Close by is the city of Jesi (18 kilometres (11 mi)), while Ancona, the capital of the Marche Region, is 40 kilometres (25 mi) away.

== History ==
Ancient Ostra was situated between the modern town of Ostra and Ostra Vetere. It was inhabited from the 3rd century BC until the 6th century AD.

Pliny the Elder mentions Ostra with another ancient town, Suasa, 8 kilometres (5 mi) west. Neither town survived beyond the classical period. Though Ostra is little mentioned by ancient authors, excavations there have brought to light remains of various buildings and several inscriptions.

By 1520, an abbey in Senigallia housing some relics of Gaudentius of Rimini had fallen into ruin. The remains were transported to the Montalboddo, where they are still found today. Gaudentius remains the town's patron saint.

== Main sights ==
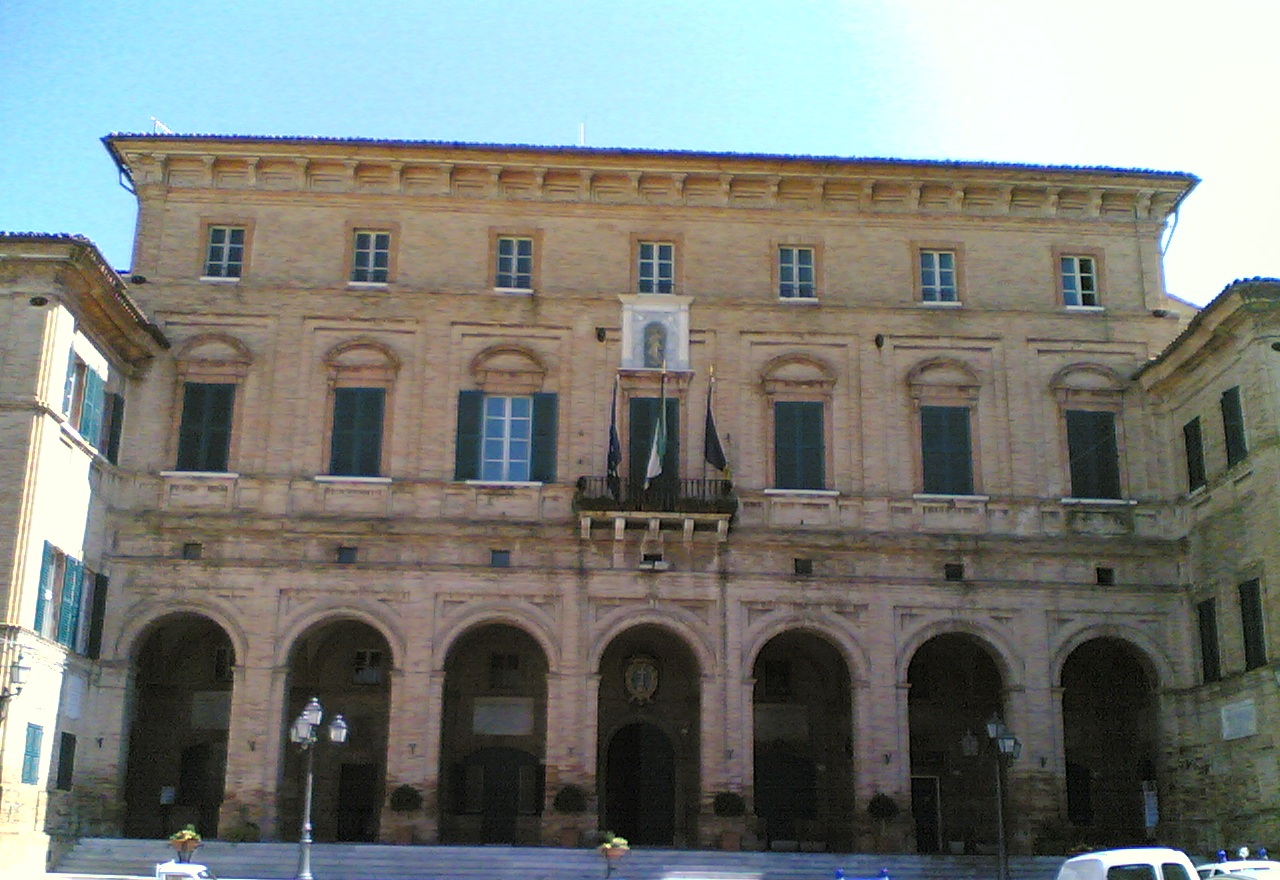
Town Hall

=== Piazza dei Martiri ===
The town's central square is Piazza dei Martiri (Martyrs' Square). Here is the 16th century city tower, 33 metres (108 ft) high, rebuilt in the 20th century after being bombed in World War II. Here also are the town hall with its arches and its marble staircase and St Francis' Church, built in the 13th century.

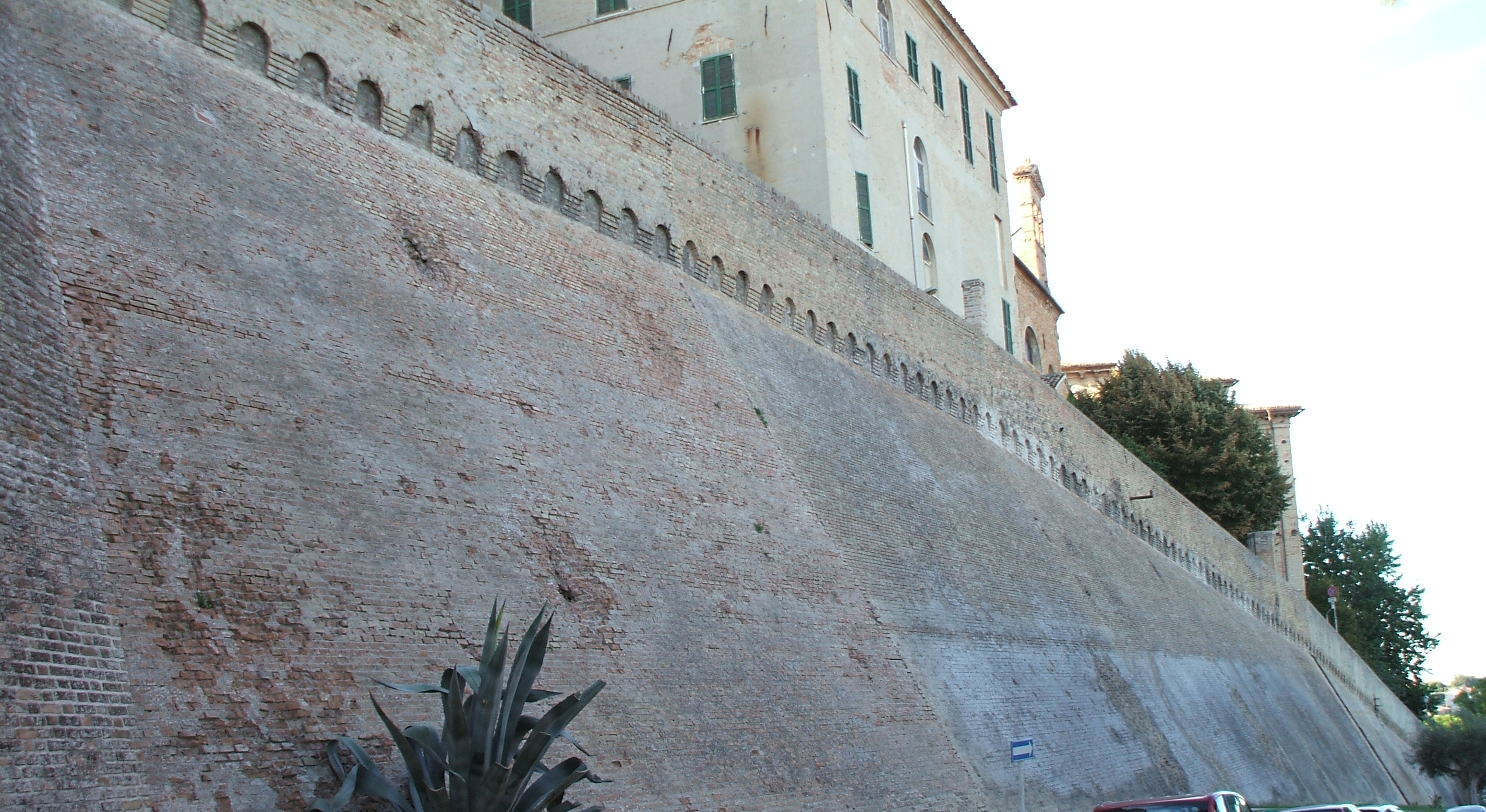
Defensive wall

=== Defensive wall ===
Built in the late Middle Ages, the wall surrounding the town is perfectly preserved for a total length of 1,200 metres (3,900 ft). It has nine extant towers and two main entrances.

=== Madonna della Rosa Sanctuary ===
Located a few hundreds metres out of town, the Marian sanctuary of Madonna della Rosa is one of the most important in Italy, visited every year by many pilgrims from Italy and Europe. It was built in 1754 after Holy Mary appeared to a young girl and fosters a miraculous image of the Virgin.

== Transport ==
The nearest railway station is that of Senigallia. Ancona-Falconara Airport is 30 kilometres (19 mi) away.

== Twin towns ==
- Markt Schwaben, Germany
