= Adolfo L. Monserrate Anselmi =

Puerto Rican politician (1909–1983)

Member of the Puerto Rico House of Representatives from the 3rd District

Personal details
- Born: March 29, 1909 Santa Isabel, Puerto Rico
- Died: February 7, 1983 (aged 73) Río Piedras, Puerto Rico
- Party: Popular Democratic Party (PPD)
- Other political affiliations: Democratic
- Education: University of Puerto Rico

Adolfo L. Monserrate Anselmi (March 29, 1909 – February 1983) was born in Santa Isabel, Puerto Rico. His brother was Humberto Monserrate Anselmi He became of the Puerto Rico House of Representatives for the Popular Democratic Party of Puerto Rico when Francisco Gustavo Solís a Representative for the District of San Juan resigned.

He graduated from the University of Puerto Rico in Pharmaceutical chemistry. There he joined Phi Sigma Alpha fraternity. From 1940 till 1954 he was the third President and Executive Director of the "Colegio de Farmacéuticos de Puerto Rico (CFPR)", organization that all the pharmacist in Puerto Rico belong to. Under his presidency Law 283 of 1945 was passed which regulated the pharmacy profession and the manufacturing distribution and dispensation of medicines in Puerto Rico. In 1952 he led the fund raising campaign for construction of the Organizations facilities in a lot ceded by the Puerto Rican Emergency Relief Administration to the CFPR for fifty cents a meter. The seat of the organization is still in Hato Rey, Puerto Rico to this day.

He was Associate Commissioner of the Puerto Rico Public Service Commission along with Rafael Hernández Colón. He was an alternate delegate from the Puerto Rico Delegation to the 1964 Democratic National Convention. Along with Germán Rieckehoff he help in the organization and development of equestrian sport in Puerto Rico.

Adolfo L. Monserrate Anselmi died on February 7, 1983. Was buried at Buxeda Memorial Park in Río Piedras, Puerto Rico.
