= Misa (river in Italy) =

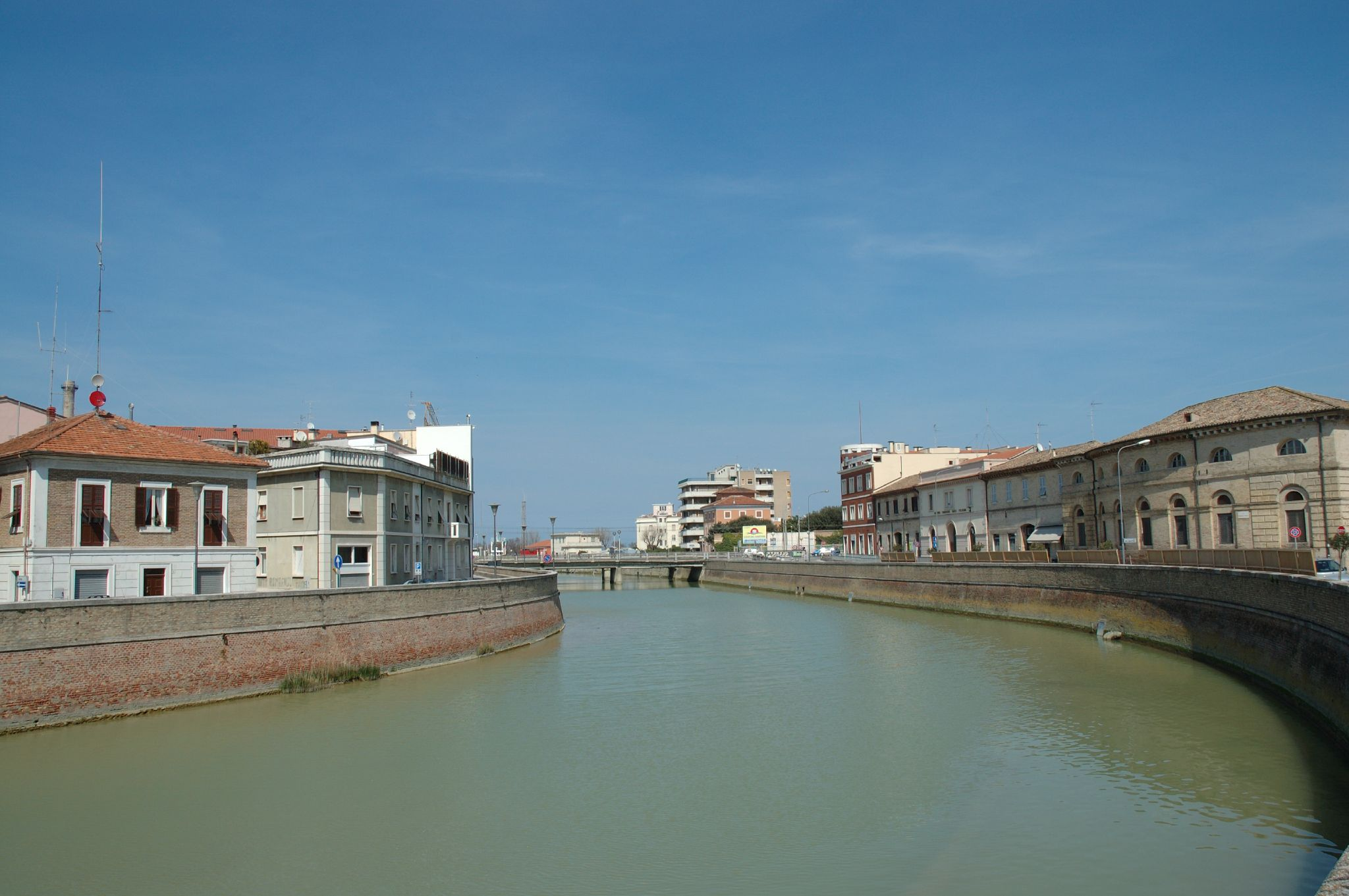
- Misa river flowing through Senigallia

Location
- Country: Italy

Physical characteristics
- Source
  - location: Province of Ancona, near Arcevia
  - elevation: 793 m (2,602 ft)
- Mouth: Adriatic Sea
  - coordinates: 43.7226°N 13.2223°E
- Length: 45 km (28 mi)
- Basin size: 377 km^{2} (146 sq mi)
- Discharge
  - average: 700 m^{3}/s (25,000 cu ft/s) (max)

The Misa (Latin: Misus) is a river in the Marche region of Italy. It runs for over 48 kilometres through the region. The source of the river lies south of Arcevia in the province of Ancona. The river flows northeast near Serra de' Conti, Ostra Vetere and Ostra. The river is joined by the Nevola before entering the Adriatic Sea near Senigallia.
