= Council of Ariminum =

Synod of the early church, 359

The Council of Ariminum, also known as the Council of Rimini, was an early Christian church synod in Ariminum, modern-day Rimini, in 359. Called by Roman Emperor Constantius II to resolve the Arian controversy, the Council of Ariminum for western bishops paralleled the Council of Seleucia for eastern bishops.

Though the Council of Ariminum concluded in favour of the Nicene Creed by 21 July 359, its consensus was overturned on 10 October 359, when the council's envoys to Constantius accepted a Homoean creed. Bishops remaining at Ariminum were forced to assent to the creed. Pope Liberius later declared that the Council of Ariminum was held without authority.

== Background ==
In 358, the Roman Emperor Constantius II requested two councils, one of the western bishops of the Roman Empire at Ariminum (modern-day Rimini), and one of the eastern bishops, planned for Nicomedia but eventually held at Seleucia Isauria. Constantius had visited Rimini in 357, and commissioned the praetorian prefect, Taurus, to prepare the city for the council; the location was likely chosen because local clergy were sympathetic to Arianism.

The councils were called to resolve the Arian controversy which plagued the fourth-century early church. Arian creeds had been drafted in the Councils of Sirmium in 357 and 358, considered the highpoints of Arianism. As was customary, participating bishops in the Council of Ariminum were guaranteed free transport and supplies. Bishops from Gaul, except three British bishops, insisted on paying their own expenses so as not to constrain their freedom in the council.

The Council of Seleucia was held in September 359, with 150 eastern bishops participating.

== Council ==
The council opened on 27 May 359, and concluded on 21 July. It was hosted in the Cathedral of Santa Colomba, no longer extant, with Arian supporters worshipping at a chapel, traditionally reported to be a downtrodden area near the Arch of Augustus, known as la Gajana, renowned for its prostitutes. The council involved approximately 400 bishops, of which 40 were pro-Arian at the start of the council.

=== Victory of the Nicene Creed ===
During the council, Constantius II decreed that any decisions would need to be brought by ten representatives to Constantinople for his ratification; he would hear the council's resolutions alongside those of the Council of Seleucia. The Council of Ariminum was to consider only matters of faith and unity, while Seleucia would consider doctrinal issues.

In a series of judgments lasting until 21 July 359, the council unanimously approved the Nicene Creed, condemning as heretics the Arian bishops Ursacius, Valens, Germinius, Auxentius, Gaius of Illyricum, and Demophilus. It rejected the Dated Creed drawn by some Homoean and Semi-Arians in Sirmium on 22 May 359. After designating its ten representatives, the council sent a petition to Constantius asking that the council be adjourned and the bishops be allowed to return to their dioceses. Taurus was instructed to retain the bishops in Ariminum until Constantius dismissed the council.

=== Capitulation at Thracia ===
Despite the consensus, Ursacius, Valens, and Germinius led an Arian minority of 80 bishops. The minority wrote a separate letter to Constantius requesting that they be excused from the council. Constantius welcomed the minority petition, but refused to grant an audience to the representatives of the majority: he was preparing for the Second Perso-Roman War, and requested the majority envoys to wait, first at Hadrianople and then in Nike in Thracia.

On 10 October 359 in Nike, Restitutus of Carthage and other majority envoys accepted a revision of the Dated Creed. Returning to Ariminum, the envoys who capitulated were initially refused communion, but Taurus required the bishops remaining in Ariminum to sign the revised creed before they could leave. The last bishops left Rimini in the winter of 359. On 31 December 359, under threat from Constantius, representatives of both councils assented to the revised creed.

=== Martyrdom of Gaudentius ===
In one group of legends, Gaudentius, the first Bishop of Rimini, participated in the Council; he was against Arianism. Once it seemed certain that the Arians would lose, or to flee violence in the city, with seventeen other bishops, Gaudentius retreated to a nearby town, which tradition says was renamed Cattolica (lit. 'Catholic') after their retreat. On his return to Ariminum, Gaudentius was arrested. On one account, he was charged with condemning Arianism; in another, his miracles led him to be accused of the deaths in close succession of two imperial troops. A mob snatched him from the hands of the city's magistrates: in one account, he was lynched or stoned to death by Arian's supporters; in another, he was stoned to death for perduellio.

Gaudentius was martyred on 14 October 360. He was killed in a marshy area south of the city's Arch of Augustus, which became known as Lacus Martyrum (Lake of the Martyr); it is believed to be the etymology of Via Lagomaggio and Rimini's eponymous suburb. The account of Gaudentius' participation in the Council of Ariminum is considered inconsistent with earlier legends about his life.

== Aftermath ==
In 360, the Council of Constantinople confirmed the resolutions of Ariminum and Seleucia. The early church later disregarded the resolutions from both councils. Pope Liberius declared that the Council of Ariminum was held without authority. Hilary of Poitiers had already openly denounced the Councils' resolutions, with the result, according to one historian, that "the churches of Gaul for the first time appeared in a new light, as a force that was independent of government, and able to defy it with impunity."

Some sources attribute Taurus' appointment as a consul in 361 to his management of the Council of Ariminum.

The Nicene Creed ultimately prevailed as the accepted creed of the Church, which was confirmed (with a modest amendment) at the First Council of Constantinople in 381 (so-called because it was an ecumenical council, unlike the one in 360).
