= Ostra Vetere =

- Comune
- Comune di Ostra Vetere
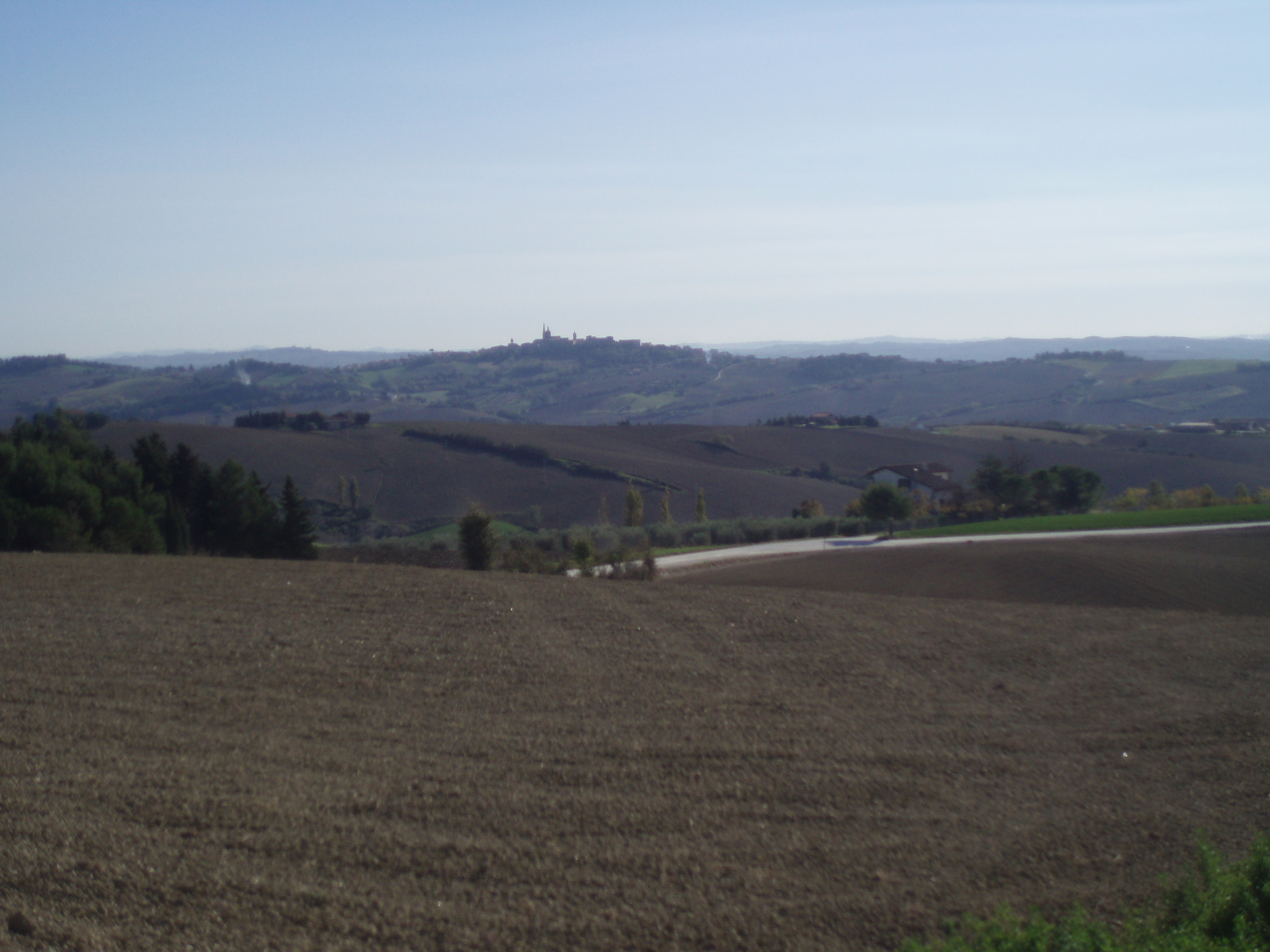

- Coat of arms

- Location within Italy Location within Marche
- Coordinates: 43°36′13.36″N 13°3′26.15″E
- Country: Italy
- Region: Marche
- Province: Ancona (AN)
- Frazioni: Acqualagna, Burello, Buscareto, Dometto, Guinzano, Molino, Pescara, Pezzolo, Pongelli, San Vito

Government
  - Mayor: Massimo Bello

Area
  - Total: 29.86 km^{2} (11.53 sq mi)
- Elevation: 250 m (820 ft)

Population (28 February 2009)
  - Total: 3,526
  - Density: 118.1/km^{2} (305.8/sq mi)
- Demonym: Ostraveterani
- Time zone: UTC+1 (CET)
  - Summer (DST): UTC+2 (CEST)
- Postal code: 60010
- Dialing code: 071
- ISTAT code: 042036
- Patron saint: St. John the Baptist
- Saint day: 24 June
- Website: Official website

Ostra Vetere is a town and comune in the region of Marche, Italy, near the modern Ostra, south-east of Senigallia.

The original name of the town was Montenovo. In 1882 the name was changed in Ostra Vetere, after the ruins of the ancient Roman city of Ostra, located near the modern town along the Misa river.
