= Lake dei Frati =

Artificial lake in Valle Brembana, Lombardy, Italy

Lago dei Frati
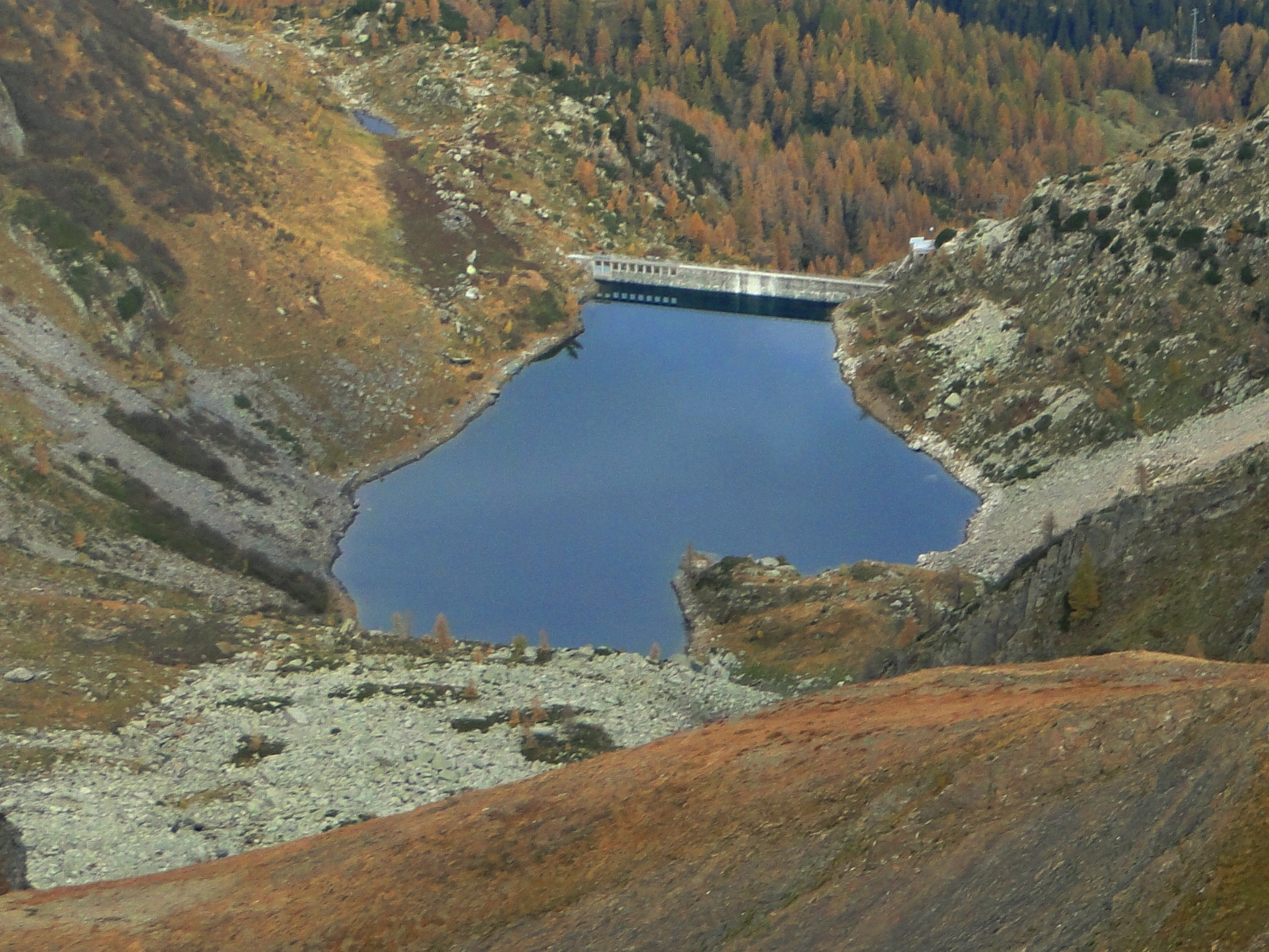
- Lago dei Frati seen from the Passo di Aviasco

- Location within Italy
- Location: Lombardy, Italy
- Coordinates: 46.0166667°N 9.83972°E
- Type: Artificial
- Basin countries: Italy

Lago dei Frati is a small artificial lake located in the upper Valle Brembana in the municipality of Carona.

Situated in the valley of the same name, which extends from the Passo di Aviasco and flows into the basin of the Rifugio Fratelli Calvi, it owes its name to the fact that, in medieval times, numerous monks from the San Benedetto Abbey (Albino) (located near Albino) passed through to reach their possessions in the Armentarga pastures.

The dam, built in 1947, creates a basin with an area of 25,000 square meters and a capacity of 330,000 m³ of water, which, together with the nearby Laghi Gemelli and Lago Colombo, feeds the hydroelectric power plant of Lago Sardegnana.

== Access ==
The shortest route to reach it starts from Carona, from where one ascends to the hamlet of Pagliari. From the small village, follow the path marked with the Club Alpino Italiano trail marker number 247, which climbs until it intersects the Sentiero delle Orobie, trail number 213. A few dozen meters further uphill, trail number 236 branches off, which runs through the Valle dei Frati, at the beginning of which the lake is located.

Alternatively, from Carona, it is possible to reach the lake by ascending to the dam of Lago di Fregabolgia (trail number 210), then descending slightly along trail 213, from which one can take the previously described trail 236.

It can also be reached from the Val Seriana, via the Passo di Aviasco, located near the Lago di Aviasco in the municipality of Valgoglio.

== Bibliography ==
- -Le acque nella bergamasca [The Waters in the Bergamo Area] (in Italian). Consorzio di Bonifica della Media Pianura Bergamasca. 2006.
