= Angelo Mai =

Italian cardinal and philologist (1782–1854)

His Eminence Angelo Mai
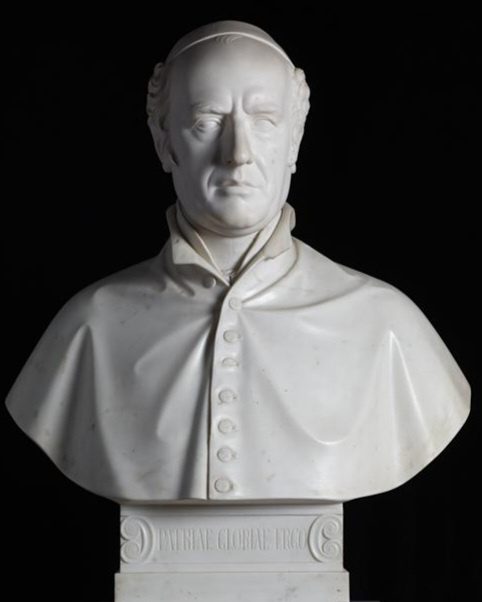
- Bust of Angelo Mai by Pietro Tenerani, 1846
- Diocese: Diocese of Rome
- Appointed: 9 April 1657
- Term ended: 4 June 1667

Orders
- Created cardinal: 19 May 1837 by Pope Gregory XVI
- Rank: Cardinal-Priest of San Sant'Anastasia

Personal details
- Born: March 7, 1782 Schilpario, Republic of Venice
- Died: 8 September 1854 (aged 72) Castel Gandolfo, Papal States
- Buried: Sant'Anastasia al Palatino
- Denomination: Roman Catholic
- Parents: Angelo Mai; Pietra di Antonio Mai dei Battistei
- Education: Roman College
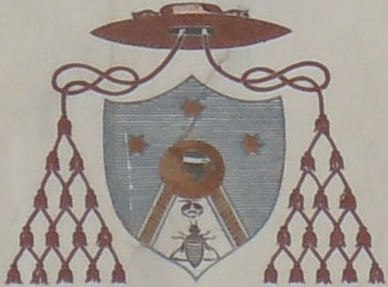
- Coat of arms

Angelo Mai (Latin Angelus Maius; 7 March 1782 – 8 September 1854) was an Italian Cardinal and philologist. He won a European reputation for publishing for the first time a series of previously unknown ancient texts. These he was able to discover and publish, first while in charge of the Ambrosian Library in Milan and then in the same role at the Vatican Library. The texts were often in parchment manuscripts that had been washed off and reused; he was able to read the lower text using chemicals. In particular he was able to locate a substantial portion of the much sought-after De re publica of Cicero and the complete works of Virgilius Maro Grammaticus. In 1954, to celebrate the first century after his death, the public library of Bergamo, the city where he was from, was named after him Biblioteca civica Angelo Mai e archivi storici.

== Biography ==
He was born of humble parents at Schilpario in what is now the province of Bergamo, Lombardy.

In 1799 he entered the Society of Jesus, and in 1804 he became a teacher of classics in the college of Naples. After completing his studies at the Collegium Romanum, he lived for some time at Orvieto, where he was engaged in teaching and palaeographical studies. The political events of 1808, when French troops occupied the Papal States, necessitated his withdrawal from Rome (to which he had meanwhile returned) to Milan, where in 1813 he was made custodian of the Ambrosian library.

He now threw himself with characteristic energy and zeal into the task of examining the numerous manuscripts committed to his charge, and in the course of the next six years was able to restore to the world a considerable number of long-lost works. Having withdrawn from the Society of Jesus, he was invited to Rome in 1819 as chief keeper of the Vatican Library. In 1833 he was transferred to the office of secretary of the Congregation of the Propaganda; on 12 February 1838 he was raised to the dignity of cardinal. He died at Castel Gandolfo, near Albano, on 8 September 1854. His monumental tomb is located in the left transept of the Basilica di Sant'Anastasia al Palatino by the late neoclassical sculptor Giovanni Maria Benzoni.

== Works ==
It is on his skill as a reader of palimpsests that Mai's fame chiefly rests. To the period of his residence at Milan belong:

- fragments of Cicero's Pro Scauro, Pro Tullio, Pro Flacco, In Clodium et Curionem, De aere alieno Milonis, and De rege Alexandrino (1814)
- M. Corn. Frontonis opera inedita, cum epistolis item ineditis, Antonini Pii, Marci Aurelii, Lucii Veri et Appiani (1815; new ed., 1823, with more than 100 additional letters found in the Vatican library)
- portions of eight speeches of Quintus Aurelius Symmachus
- fragments of Plautus
- the oration of Isaeus' De hereditate Cleonymi
- the last nine books of the Antiquities of Dionysius of Halicarnassus, and a number of other works.
- M Tullii Ciceronis de republica quae supersunt appeared at Rome in 1822
- Scriptorum veterum nova collectio, e Vaticanis codicibus edita ("A new collection of ancient writings, edited from Vatican codices") in 1825-1838
- Classici scriptores e Vaticanis codicibus editi ("Classical writers edited from Vatican codices") in 1828-1838
- Spicilegium Romanum ("A Roman gleaning") in 1839-1844
- Patrum nova bibliotheca ("A new library of [Church] fathers") in 1845-1853

His edition of the celebrated Codex Vaticanus, completed in 1838, but not published (ostensibly on the ground of inaccuracies) till four years after his death (1858), is the least satisfactory of his labours and was superseded by the edition of Vercellone and Cozza (1868), which itself leaves much to be desired.

Although Mai was not as successful in textual criticism as in the decipherment of manuscripts, his works in this field allowed many ancient writings to be rescued from oblivion.
