= Tonoli =

Tonoli is an Italian surname. Notable people with this name include the following:

- Andrea Tonoli (born 1991), Italian composer and musician
- Giovanni Tonoli (1947–1993), Italian cyclist

== See also ==
- Alessandro Tonolli
