= Gromo =

- Comune
- Comune di Gromo
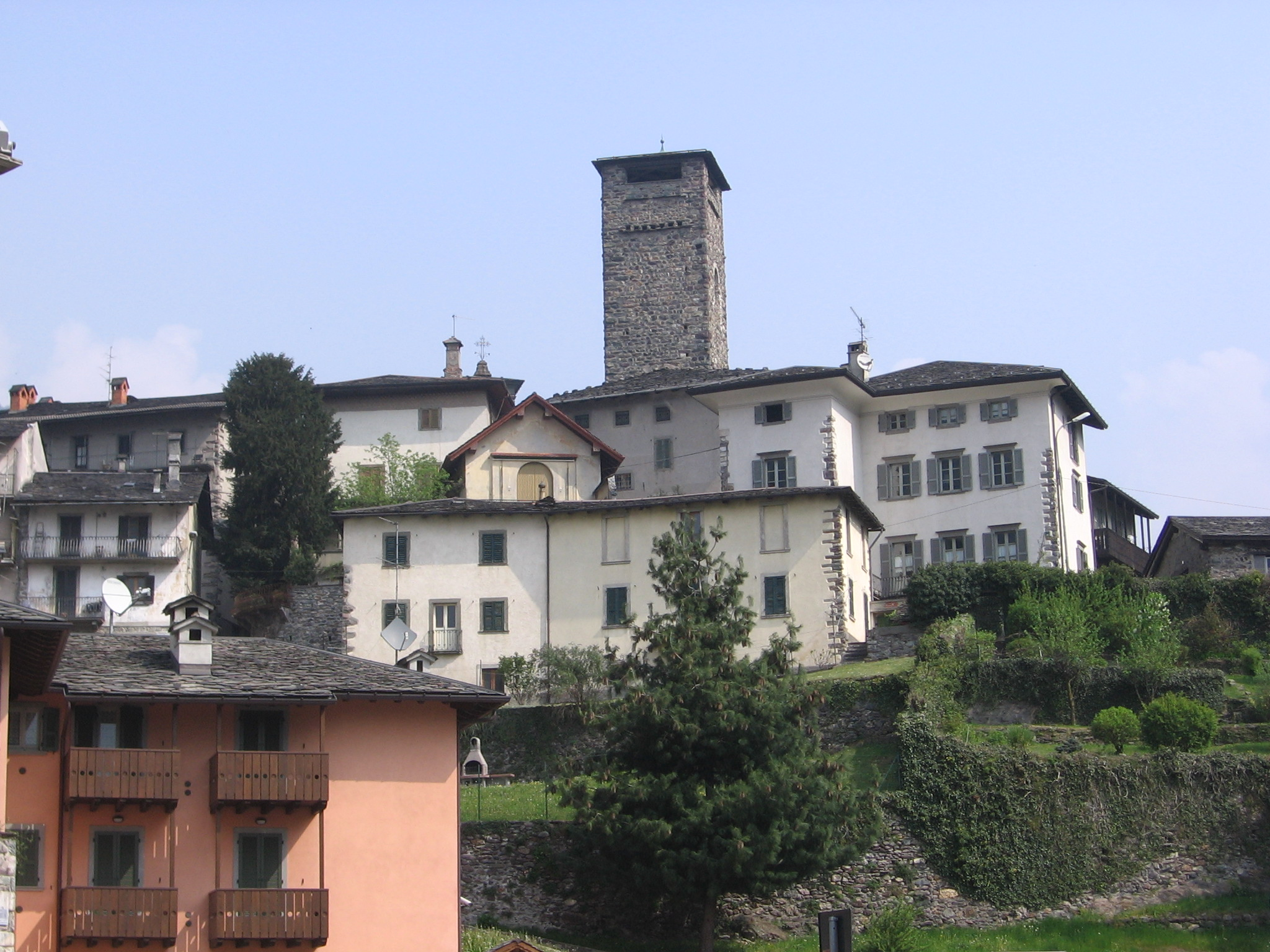
- Gromo

- Location within Italy Location within Lombardy
- Coordinates: 45°58′N 9°56′E
- Country: Italy
- Region: Lombardy
- Province: Province of Bergamo (BG)
- Frazioni: Boario, Spiazzi, Ripa

Area
  - Total: 20.0 km^{2} (7.7 sq mi)
- Elevation: 676 m (2,218 ft)

Population (Dec. 2004)
  - Total: 1,246
  - Density: 62.3/km^{2} (161/sq mi)
- Demonym: Gromesi
- Time zone: UTC+1 (CET)
  - Summer (DST): UTC+2 (CEST)
- Postal code: 24020
- Dialing code: 0346

Gromo (Bergamasque: Gróm) is a comune (municipality) in the Province of Bergamo in the Italian region of Lombardy, located about 80 kilometres (50 mi) northeast of Milan and about 35 kilometres (22 mi) northeast of Bergamo. As of 31 December 2004, it had a population of 1,246 and an area of 20.0 square kilometres (7.7 mi^{2}).

The municipality of Gromo contains the frazioni (subdivisions, mainly villages and hamlets) Boario, Spiazzi and Ripa. Gromo borders the following municipalities: Ardesio, Gandellino, Oltressenda Alta, Valbondione, Valgoglio, Vilminore di Scalve. It is one of I Borghi più belli d'Italia ("The most beautiful villages of Italy").

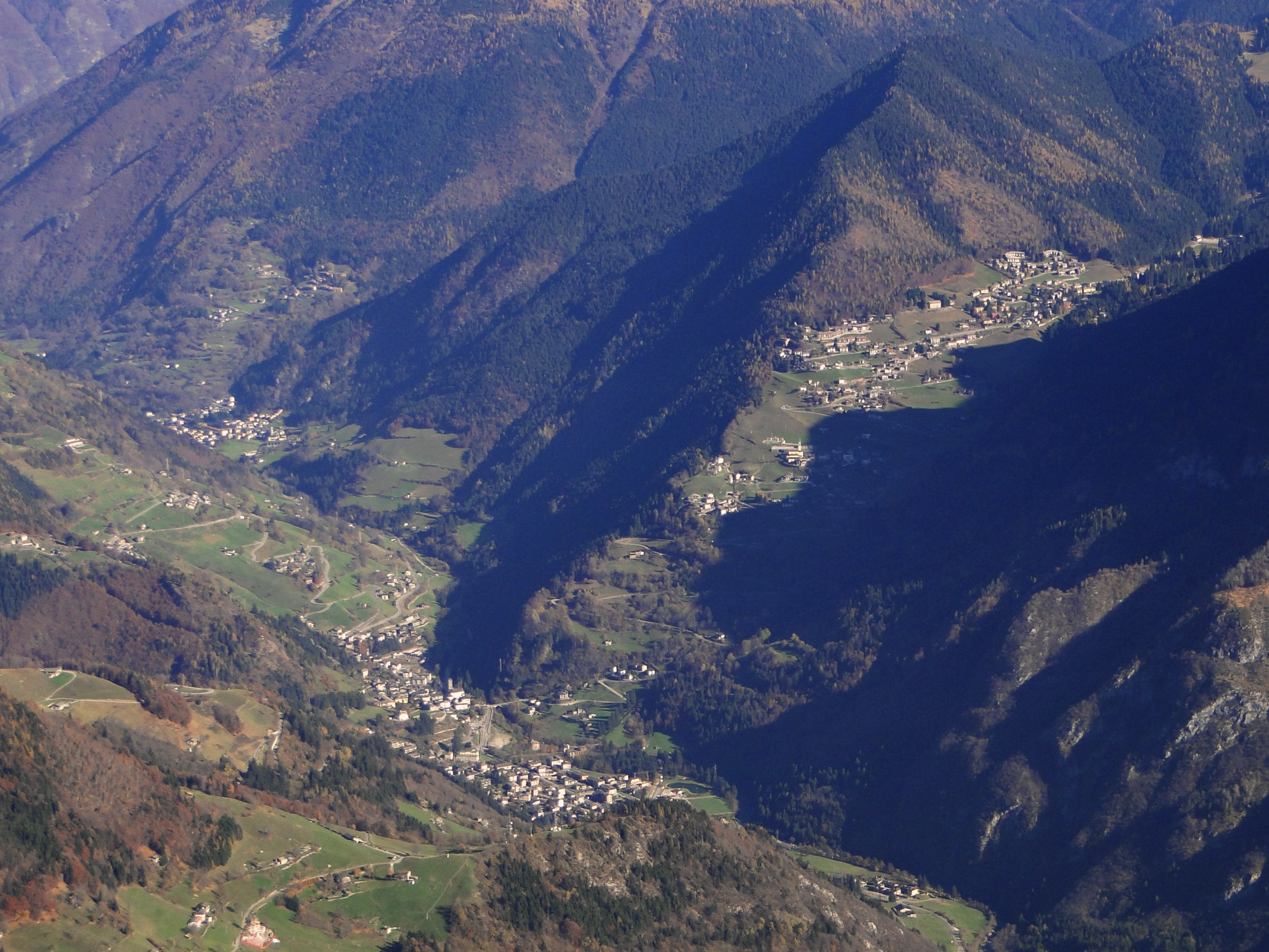
aerial view of Gromo

It is positioned within the Lombardy Prealps, specifically in the Bergamasque Prealps. It is located on the right side of the Serio River in the upper Seriana Valley; during the Middle Ages it was known as the little Toledo thanks to some smithies that turned it into an important centre for iron making and the consequent realization of cold weapons, halberds, shields and armors.

== Demographic evolution ==
Historical population

Year	Pop.	±%
1861	1,109	—
1871	1,142	+3.0%
1881	1,191	+4.3%
1901	1,294	+8.6%
1911	1,534	+18.5%

Year	Pop.	±%
1921	1,547	+0.8%
1931	1,630	+5.4%
1936	1,441	−11.6%
1951	1,733	+20.3%
1961	1,738	+0.3%

Year	Pop.	±%
1971	1,408	−19.0%
1981	1,324	−6.0%
1991	1,252	−5.4%
2001	1,225	−2.2%

Source: Data from ISTAT

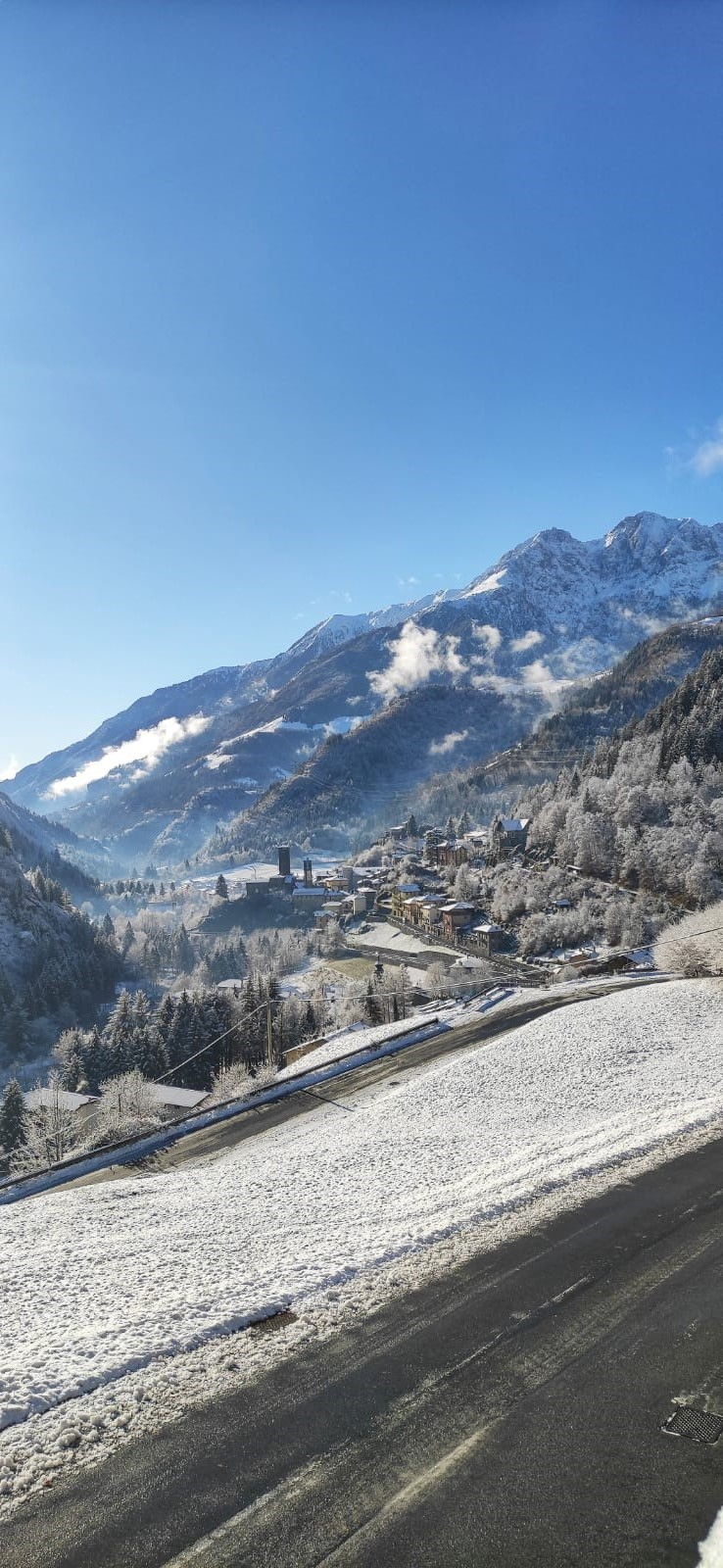
December 2020 snowfall – Gromo

== Geography ==
=== Territory ===
The municipality is made by the centre located on a rock dominating the Serio river, at 676 m above the sea level and by some hamlets nestled along both the mountainous slopes of the valley. The territory is included between 604 and 2534 m above the sea level.

To the north we find the hamlet of Ripa, while to the east there are the ones of Boario and Spiazzi, composed of different built up areas all located among 900 and 1200 m above the sea level.

The road connecting Gromo and Spiazzi is 7.5 km long, curvy and panoramic, runs for the first kilometers deep in the green woods up to the hamlet of Valzella, the first small inhabited unit originally composed by a dozen of farmsteads and housed built with stones and slate roofs, well conserved and inhabited, enriched by some vacation blocks of flats.

From Valzella on, the road exits the woods, reaches the small hamlet of Boario and keeps on up to reach the pine forest in Spiazzi locality.

=== Karstic cavern ===
Bus di Tacoi is a cave of karstic origin positioned on Redondo Mount. It preserves some of the best examples of karstic forms known. You can reach it in 1 hour walk from Spiazzi di Gromo and its entrance is located 1550m above the sea level. It is divided in four sectors composed by tunnels, hallways and detachments for a total length of 1217 m and a difference in altitude of 189 m up to the deepest point that is the green lake. The origin of the name (in Italian Buco dei Gracchi) is referred to a mountainous bird that nestled at the entrance of the cave.

=== Climate ===
Gromo is located in a valley, so it has a tight and steep valley floor. Its climate is continental, with cold and relatively dry winters and relatively warm and humid summers. In winter, with clear sky, you can find the typical temperature inversion with the lowest temperatures between −4° and −6°, while in summer the lowest temperatures can be around 16°/17°, reaching 25–26°. Often, winter can be snowy. Even in case of temperatures above 30–33°, wind is always quite present and winds dry and moderated.

== Origins of the name ==
Its toponym comes from a Latin word: Grumus, meaning upland, hill. Based on this theory there are many examples within the province of Bergamo, referred to places nearby hills or mountains like Grumello del Monte, Gromlongo (hamlet of Palazzago) and Bergamo's hill Gromo, that gave the name to Gromo street, then changed into San Cassinao street and finally into Gaetano Donizetti street.

== History ==
=== Origins and Middleages ===
In Natural History, Pliny the Elder (23–79 AD) wrote of the first Christians condemned by the Romans to quarry metals in the mines of the Seriana Valley, a punishment known as Condemnation to the mines. This and some traces on weapons and corks demonstrate the presence of inhabitants on the territory up to the Roman period. The area was a shelter for the first Italians from the Barbaric invasions.

In 774 the king of the Franks, Charlemagne, gifted Saint Martin of Tours’ monastery and the one of Saint Denis de Paris with the territories of the upper Seriana Valley. Then in 1026 the Bergamo's episcopate with the bishop Ambrogio II took the property in exchange with other properties, keeping for himself the rights on the revenues from quarry and working of iron and silver present within the valley, so began a period of hard disagreements between the laic power, represented by the feudatarian and the ecclesiastic one, represented by the bishop. The first documents about the existence of the village date back to that period too: for the first time the expressions ``vallis Ardexie seu Grumi” or “curia Ardesii er Grummi”, as to point out Ardesio and Gromo as those areas that will be turned into comuni rurali.

In 1179 Bishop Guala from Bergamo, allowed the use of the goods of the upper Seriana Valley to the families provided that they were willing to pay 200 lire, the community was represented only by consuls including Cremonese de Cromo, even if the territory of Gromo was still part of the Aresio valley. By the way, it starts the formation of the Gromo county that in the 13th century seems to be autonomous.

The upper Seriana Valley became property of some families, of the civitas, Valbondione belonged to the Colleoni's, Valgoglio was property of the Dalla Crotta's while Gromo was owned by the Rivola, but the concessions were highly questioned by the different following Bishops up to 1219 when the Bishop Giovanni Tornielli threaten to excommunicate those who would not give them to the church of Bergamo, causing many controversies between the municipality of Bergamo and the episcopacy that will be represented in the next years by the bishop Guala di Brescia. The Rivola family who quarried silver to forge coins in the first mint of Bergamo, gave up the territories to the bishop; it dates back to March 1214 an act drafted in the episcopal palace where Mazzocco di Rivola and his son Olcino, sell to the bishop Giovanni Tornielli the property of their silver mine.

Gromo became an autonomous village as rural vicinia in the first half of the 13th century, and the first proper statute was written in 1238 in the garden of the Church of Saint James and Saint Vincent of Betuno di Gromo by 12 accountants and 4 notaries who gave it to the podestà Nantelmo da Crema.

The history of Gromo is embedded in the story of the province of Bergamo, the upper valley. After the Peace of Constance of 1183, the valley was donated from Arnolfo count of Austria to Pantaleone Burgente, who by promising the maintenance of some privileges gained the fidelity of the citizens. In 1252 his nephew Conte Antonio Patavino gave the land to his brother in law Alessandro Ferrarese, who swore to maintain rights and privileges. Mallevadore al Ferrarense fu Bon o Buccelleni who gained for this task the possession of the magistrate's court.

With an official act of 12 February 1267 Gromo gained its autonomy becoming an official village, maintaining the rights upon the sell of metals, not to mention the exoneration of any tribute, starting to be claimed comunia vicinorum and universitates vicinorum in burgus. Napoleone dalla Torre, podestà of Milan and Bergamo, to compensate the 200 men from Gromo who helped him in the conquest of the Castle of Covo occupied by Buoso da Duera, officially granted to Gromo the privilege to be named borgo of Bergamo, by the payment of a ransom of the amount of 433 lire. The document, named Instrumento del privilegio, is hosted and consultable in the museum in the Milesi palace, headquarter of the town hall. Two were the families who became famous with their power and their castles: Buccelleni's with the Castrum de Bucellenis, and Priacini's with the Castrum de Priacinis, from the 15th century; while from a branch of Ginami's developed the Zuchinali family. Around them developed the village with the construction of smithies and the commerce of swords.

With the occupation of Bergamo and the Province by the Visconti family, the local administration was entrusted by podestàs chosen by the headquarter, and with the Malatesta in 1408 the vicar's function was confirmed, also with the privileges previously established. Gromo as the whole Seriana valley belonged to the Guelph faction, while the Scalve valley was Ghibelline, this led to aggressive disputes up to the Venetian occupation of 1427.

== Monuments and interesting places ==
=== Religious architectures ===
==== Church of Saint Gregory the Great ====
The square is enriched with the fifteenth-century church of Saint Gregory the Great. It belongs to the local administration and it has a gate in Sarnico's stone and barrel ceiling. It hosts the altarpiece known as The Virgin with the child dating back to 1625 by Enea Salmeggia known as Il Talpino where underneath the Saints Gregory the Great and Charles Borromeo there is the landscape of the ancient Gromo as it was in the 17th century.

==== Church of Saint James and Saint Vincent ====
In 1184 the Bishop of Bergamo named a certain Alberto from Parre as priest of this church, that is the parish one dedicated to Saints James Apostle and Saint Vincent Levita. Its architectural structure is romantic and has 3 naves as well as it suffered many changes. Inside, there are many worthy works of art: the north and south naves shows a strong Baroque impact; the presbytery is composed by a gold wooden altar (1645); a choir with 34 caryatids, 6 canvas by Antonio Cifrondi about the martyrdom and death of the patron saints and two golden copper cases containing some valuable relics. Within the south nave you can find an All Saints’ day altarpiece by Antonio Marinoni, while a polypitch with golden wood frame is hosted on the northern side. The baptistery dates back to 1511 and follows the Renaissance style. Outside, at the end of the 17th century portico, you can see Saint Benedict's chapel, while nearby you can find the museum safeguarding works connected to Gromo's faith and is dedicated to the Bishop of Brescia Luigi Morstabilini, born in the small hamlet of Ripa.

==== Chapel of Saint Benedict ====
The small chapel dedicated to the Saint from Nursia was built upon the ancient cemetery that surrounded the parish church in 1454 as decided by the bishop Giovanni Buccelleni. It is located at the bottom of a portico on the west side of the church and is oriented to the north. You can enter it thanks to 2 big stoned steps, it is square shaped and decorated with frescoes about Saint Benedict's life and the one of his sister. On the floor there is also the gravestone of the bishop Francesco Buccelleni who died in 1482.

==== Church of the Holy Trinity ====
The small church is located in the upper part of the Ripa hamlet, is dedicated to the Holy Trinity, and dates back to the first half of the 16th century due to Andriolo de Burlandis wanting who offered a golden ducat for the construction of a place of worship for the areas of Burlandis e Mascheri. The ancient mule track leads to the church that has a simple facade turned to the east where there is the only access and two small windows. The inside, that can be reached through 4 stoned steps, has a square plan and only a nave, and frescoes dating back to the 16th century. The main wooden altar has an 18th-century altarpiece representing the Holy Trinity. Sideways, there are some paintings about Anthony of Padua and Saint John the Apostle. A canvas about San Francesco is located next to the entrance of the sacristy.

==== Church of the visit of Blessed Virgin Mary ====
The church located in the lower part of the hamlet Ripa is dedicated to the visit of Blessed Virgin Mary to her cousin Elizabeth, originally built in 1565 then destroyed in 1945. The church, headed to the south, is visible from the valley floor too. The gate is topped by a frescoed lunette with the image of the Immaculate Heart of Mary while the two lateral windows present superior arches with the representation of Saint Francis of Assisi and Saint Teresa of Ávila. The inner part has a rectangular nave divided into two spans by two big columns that lead to the arches. The church is lit up by some round windows. A side entrance is located in the second span. The presbytery with barrel ceiling is slightly narrower with respect to the nave and is preceded by a triumphal stone arch laying on square pillars and taking light by the window located on the right. The main wooden altar has a 16th-century ancon in alpine baroque about the Virgin Mary's visit to her cousin Elizabeth with Saints.

==== Church of Saint Bernardino of Siena ====
This small oratory is located within Saint Bernardino's hamlet (Spiazzi) and dedicated to this Saint from Siena. It was built in the 15th century, and a document says its construction was ended by 1479, some years later the sanctification of the preacher. The vault is enriched by a fresco with the Saint holding the trigraph. A well done polyptych covers the presbytery.

==== Church of Our Lady of Sorrows ====
The small oratory known also as Chiesa della Crocetta, built with a worship purpose, stores a fresco dating back to the first half of the 16th century, so it is considered that this building would date back to that period.

=== Civil architectures ===
==== Milesi Palace ====
Built in the 15th century, Milesi palace is covered with veined grey marble coming from the nearby quarries in Ardesio. It conserves its facade, with windows’ frames and outlines, as well as the beams composing the ceiling of the central hall on the first floor. Two exterior galleries, overlapping the ground floor's portico, the columns with the angle leaves capitals, typical of the Bergamasque's construction, date it back to the first half of 1400. At the beginning it belonged to the Ginami family, then to the Franzini's and Scacchi's, and approximately up to the end of 1700 moved to the Milesi family. A circular fountain, already mentioned in some documents of 1399, in white marble decorate the square in front of the palace, that remains one of the few monuments whose Baroque style has not been changed over years. With an act of 1924, the Milesi's sold the palace to the local administration, including also many documents of the Valerio Milesi collection which, dating back from 15th to 19th century, are a proof of the cultural heritage of the territory. Nowadays, the palace hosts the local administration offices, the tourism office, while on the upper floors you can find the MAP museum (Museo delle armi bianche e delle pergamene) and the Eco-Naturalistic museum. During the summer season many art exhibitions are held, which saw among the exhibitors Cesare Paolantonio, and Trento Longaretti.

==== Bonetti Palace ====
Located in the central part of the village, along the ancient Milesi street leading to Piazza Dante, it is composed by more units with an inner garden where there were the undergrounds that in the medieval period were used as warehouses for swords and iron planks. The palace was built nearby San Luigi Gonzaga church and the hospital then suppressed. The palace presents a 16th-century arcade with small columns in marble and Doric capitals. An old legend tells that it was the home of Rossì o Rusì, a bandit who, inside the undergrounds closed in a young shepherdess.

==== Liberty Villas ====
Along the mule track that leads from the village to Ripa hamlet, we find some villas in a Liberty style dating back to the beginning of the 20th century, realized by Berardo Cittadini and used as private houses.

=== Militar architectures ===
==== Ginami castle ====
Built upon a spur of a rock in the first half of the 13th century by the Buccelleni family, the castle dominated the village. The imposing tower, left almost untouched within the centuries, is its main characteristic. In the 16th century it became property of the Ginami family, from whom it takes after the name and it kept on being architecturally modified until the 17th century. Saint Christopher's fresco belongs to the first half of 1900, and is positioned on the facade in front of the square. The castle now hosts a restaurant.

==== Castle and Priacini Tower or Lavanderio's tower ====
The castle has an ancient history: the Priacini family gave the name to the castle but moved in the 14th century to Bergamo, so Antoniolo Priacini in 1399 gifted fondazione MIA with the tower with the purpose of transforming it into an hospital. A document dating back to 1428 mentions the castle as located in the upper part of Gromo, toward the river Goglio and belonged to the Buccelleni family. Only the first portion of the tower still remains visible in its original shape, and is also called del Lavanderio, while the other part has been modified over the years, now in a castel style with tower, inner court and crenellation. The property went from Avogadro's to Ciuffrida's who well restored the castle and then sold it to the Lubrini's family. Due to a misinterpretation of the calligraphy in a survey of 1428 the castle was wrongly pointed out as del Gananderio.

==== Olivari's tower ====
The ancient tower is located in the upper part of the village, and is mentioned in a document dating back to 1406 as Olivari's curtis. The tower doesn't have any more the original height, but shows itself as an important square block structure inserted in a big complex of buildings.

== Culture ==
=== Penna d'Oro – Dialect contest ===
The contest Penna d’Oro was conceived by the De Marchi sisters, the lawyer Licinio Filisetti and an engineer Adolfo Ferrari with a jury represented by the poet Giacinto Gambirasio with the purpose of stimulating the literal production of literary works using the dialectal language and has been the most important cultural meeting of the village. In 1988 the Pro Loco, who has for long been the organizer of the events, decided to open the contest also to a regional level. Many were the poets who decided to take part revealing the different details of dialect languages. From 2013 the contest is organised by the library council, opening it not only to poetry but also to poems in Lombardy dialect.

== Anthropic geography ==
The administrative centre is divided into 3 localities: the central part, almost remained untouched in its structure of medieval village where the local administration is settled and corresponds with the oldest part with the Ginami Castle, the town hall inside Palazzo Milesi, and the church of Saint Gregory. In the southern part there is the locality named Pranzera. In the northern part Bettuno locality, the oldest part where is located the parish church already mentioned in 1184.

=== Hamlets ===
==== Boario ====
The hamlet of Boario Spiazzi is located on the left bank of the Serio River, nowadays almost melded with Valzella, thanks to the recent construction of some houses of blocks. Boario is the originally bigger nucleus with its Baroque church and the nearby parish priest's house and other buildings made of rocks and slate roofs. Its etymology comes from the fact that it seems it has always been a place for cattle raising. A parchment dating back to 1179 names a Paulus de Boero.

==== Spiazzi ====
Ascending from Boario via several hairpin turns, the road leeds up to the first groups of holiday homes that make up Spiazzi. This popular ski resort has seen rapid winter tourism growth since the early 2000s, following the cable transport expansion up to the area of Vodala.

==== Ripa ====
Located on the north-western part of the village, it is divided into 2 hamlets, Ripa Bassa and Ripa Alta, where you can find 2 churches: that of the visit of Blessed Virgin Mary, and the oratory of the Holy Trinity. The hamlet is now scarcely inhabited due to the migration to industrial locations in the 1950s–1960s.

== Bibliography ==
- Bortolo Pasinelli, Gromo nel XV secolo, Bergamo, Corponove, 2011.
- Don Virgilio Fenaroli, Gromo sfogliando l'album del novecento, Ferrari edizioni.
- Gabriele Nobili, Statuerent Quod Comune ed Gromo et Omnes Hatantes Sint Burgum Et Burgienses, ISBN 88-89393-03-3.
- Penna d'Oro concorso di poesia in lingua lombarda, EQUA Edizioni.
- Ketto Cattaneo Renato Morgandi, Il sentiero da "Tutte Belle" a Ripa Alta, Maggioni Lino srl, 2006.
- Virgilio Fenaroli, La chiesa di Gromo Fede, Storia, Arte, Listostampa Istituro Grafica Bergamo.
- Umberto Zanetti, Paesi e luoghi di Bergamo. Note di etimologia di oltre 1.000 toponimi, Bergamo, 1985. No ISBN.
- Paolo Oscar e Oreste Belotti, Atlante storico del territorio bergamasco, Clusone, Ferrari, 2000, ISBN 88-86536-17-8.
- Giovanni Silini Antonio Previtali, Statuta de Gromo, Litoripografia presservice 80-Rovetta, 1998.
- Gabriele Medolago, La Rovina del Goglio, Comune di Gromo e Valgoglio, 2015.
- AA.VV., Gromo, Comune di Gromo, 1975.
- Simone Facchinetti, La pala di Ognissanti a Gromo, Bergamo, 2009.
- Bortolo Pasinelli, L'arte della spaderia a Gromo nei contratti del XV secolo, Bergamo, cura edizionale Renato Morganti, 2016.
- Gianni Barachetti, Possedimenti del vescovo di Bergamo nella valle di Ardesio documenti del se.XI-XV, Secomandi.
- AA.VV. Gromo Comune di Gromo, 2019.
