= Valbondione =

- Comune
- Comune di Valbondione
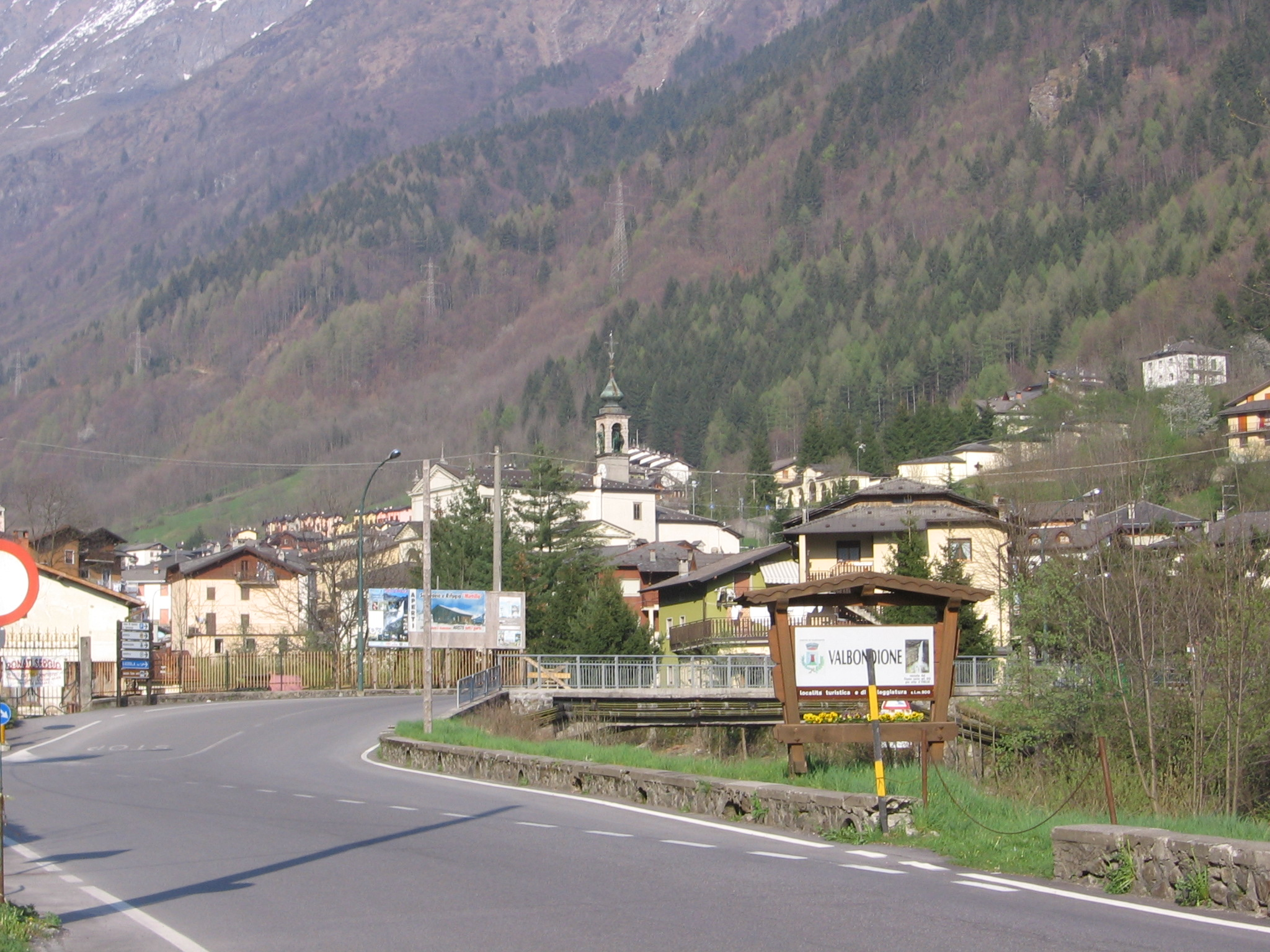
- Valbondione

- Location within Italy Location within Lombardy
- Coordinates: 46°6′N 9°47′E
- Country: Italy
- Region: Lombardy
- Province: Province of Bergamo (BG)
- Frazioni: Fiumenero, Lizzola Alta, Lizzola Bassa, Bondione, Maslana, Gavazzo, Dossi

Area
  - Total: 95.0 km^{2} (36.7 sq mi)
- Elevation: 900 m (3,000 ft)

Population (Dec. 2004)
  - Total: 1,156
  - Density: 12.2/km^{2} (31.5/sq mi)
- Demonym: Valbondionesi
- Time zone: UTC+1 (CET)
  - Summer (DST): UTC+2 (CEST)
- Postal code: 24020
- Dialing code: 0346

Valbondione (Bergamasque: Valbundiù) is a comune (municipality) in the Province of Bergamo in the Italian region of Lombardy, located about 90 kilometres (56 mi) northeast of Milan and about 45 kilometres (28 mi) north of Bergamo. It is surrounded by the Orobie Alps. As of 31 December 2004, it had a population of 1,156 and an area of 95.0 square kilometres (36.7 mi^{2}).

The municipality of Valbondione contains the frazioni (subdivisions, mainly villages and hamlets) Fiumenero, Lizzola Alta, Lizzola Bassa, Bondione, Maslana, Gavazzo, and Dossi.

Valbondione borders the following municipalities: Carona, Gandellino, Gromo, Piateda, Ponte in Valtellina, Teglio, Vilminore di Scalve.

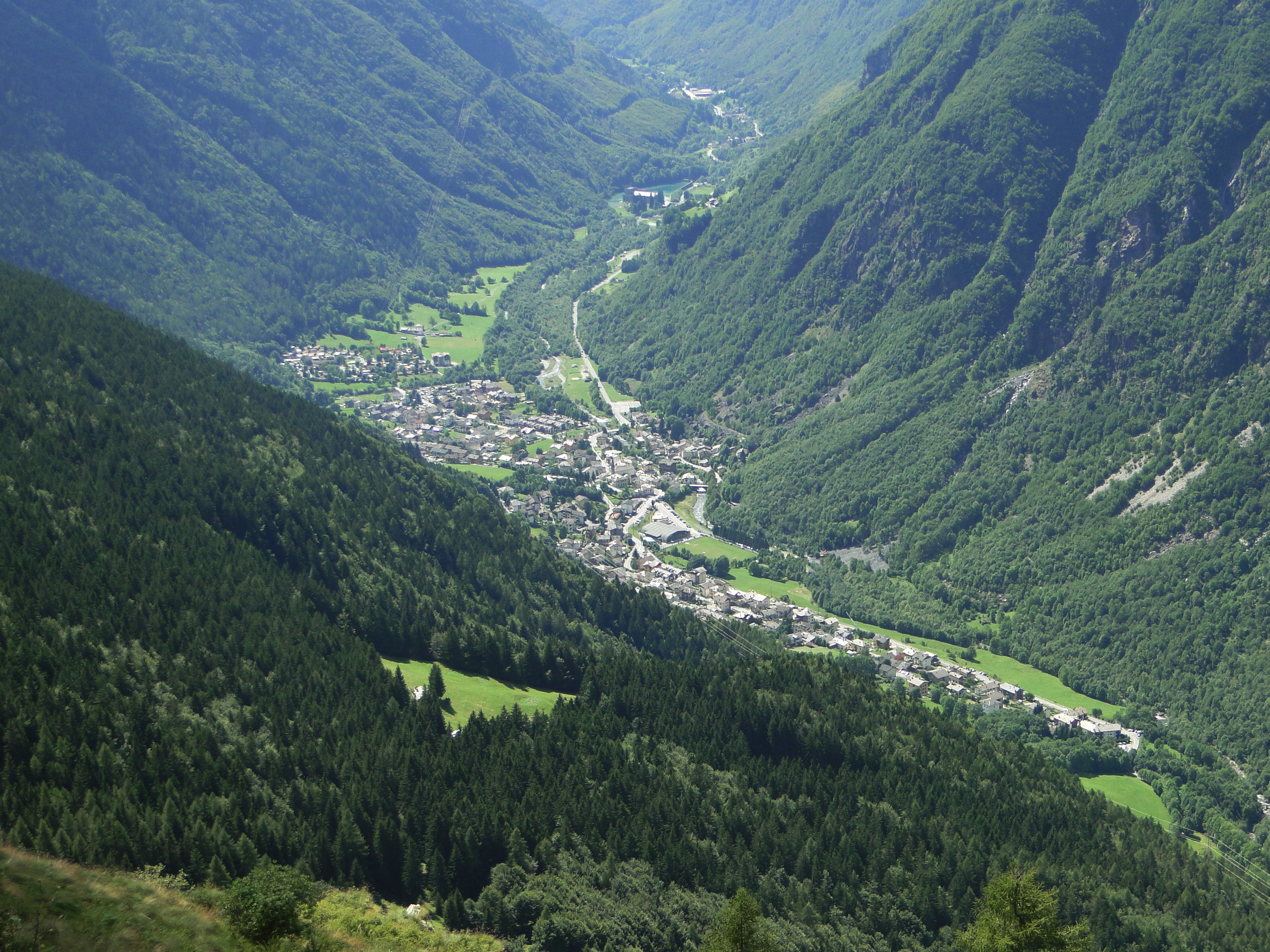
Aerial view of Valbondione

== Demographic evolution ==
Historical population

| Year | Pop. | ±% |
|---|---|---|
| 1861 | 1,402 | — |
| 1871 | 1,496 | +6.7% |
| 1881 | 1,405 | −6.1% |
| 1901 | 1,466 | +4.3% |
| 1911 | 1,658 | +13.1% |

| Year | Pop. | ±% |
|---|---|---|
| 1921 | 1,744 | +5.2% |
| 1931 | 2,003 | +14.9% |
| 1936 | 1,745 | −12.9% |
| 1951 | 1,835 | +5.2% |
| 1961 | 1,910 | +4.1% |

| Year | Pop. | ±% |
|---|---|---|
| 1971 | 1,699 | −11.0% |
| 1981 | 1,507 | −11.3% |
| 1991 | 1,316 | −12.7% |
| 2001 | 1,168 | −11.2% |

Source: Data from ISTAT
