= Vilminore di Scalve =

- Comune
- Comune di Vilminore di Scalve
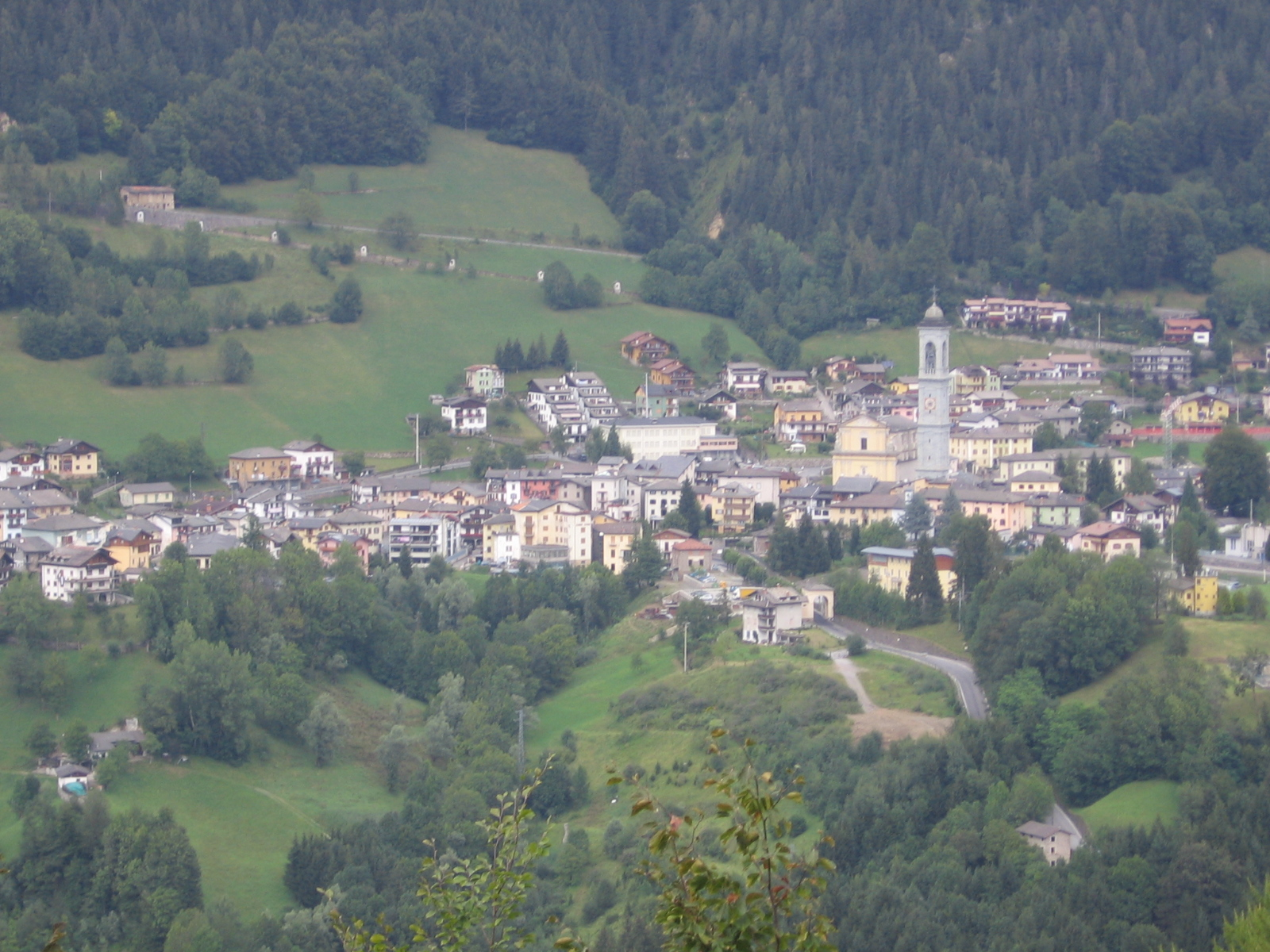
- Vilminore di Scalve

- Location within Italy Location within Lombardy
- Coordinates: 46°0′N 10°6′E
- Country: Italy
- Region: Lombardy
- Province: Province of Bergamo (BG)
- Frazioni: Vilmaggiore, S. Andrea, Dezzolo, Bueggio, Nona, Pezzolo, Pianezza, Teveno

Area
  - Total: 40.9 km^{2} (15.8 sq mi)
- Elevation: 1,019 m (3,343 ft)

Population (Dec. 2010)
  - Total: 1,532
  - Density: 37.5/km^{2} (97.0/sq mi)
- Demonym: Vilminoresi
- Time zone: UTC+1 (CET)
  - Summer (DST): UTC+2 (CEST)
- Postal code: 24020
- Dialing code: 0346
- Website: Official website

Vilminore di Scalve (Bergamasque: Ilminùr) is a comune (municipality) in the Province of Bergamo in the Italian region of Lombardy, located about 90 kilometres (56 mi) northeast of Milan and about 45 kilometres (28 mi) northeast of Bergamo. As of 31 December 2010, it had a population of 1,532 and an area of 40.9 square kilometres (15.8 mi^{2}).

The municipality of Vilminore di Scalve contains the frazioni (subdivisions, mainly villages and hamlets) Vilmaggiore, S. Andrea, Dezzolo, Bueggio, Nona, Pezzolo, Pianezza, and Teveno.

Vilminore di Scalve borders the following municipalities: Azzone, Colere, Gromo, Oltressenda Alta, Rovetta, Schilpario, Teglio, Valbondione.

== Demographic evolution ==
Historical population

Year	Pop.	±%
1861	1,912	—
1871	2,074	+8.5%
1881	2,145	+3.4%
1901	2,147	+0.1%
1911	2,330	+8.5%

Year	Pop.	±%
1921	2,334	+0.2%
1931	2,096	−10.2%
1936	1,911	−8.8%
1951	2,140	+12.0%
1961	2,166	+1.2%

Year	Pop.	±%
1971	1,810	−16.4%
1981	1,554	−14.1%
1991	1,510	−2.8%
2001	1,547	+2.5%

Source: Data from ISTAT
