= Casere Lake =

Lake in Lombardy, Italy

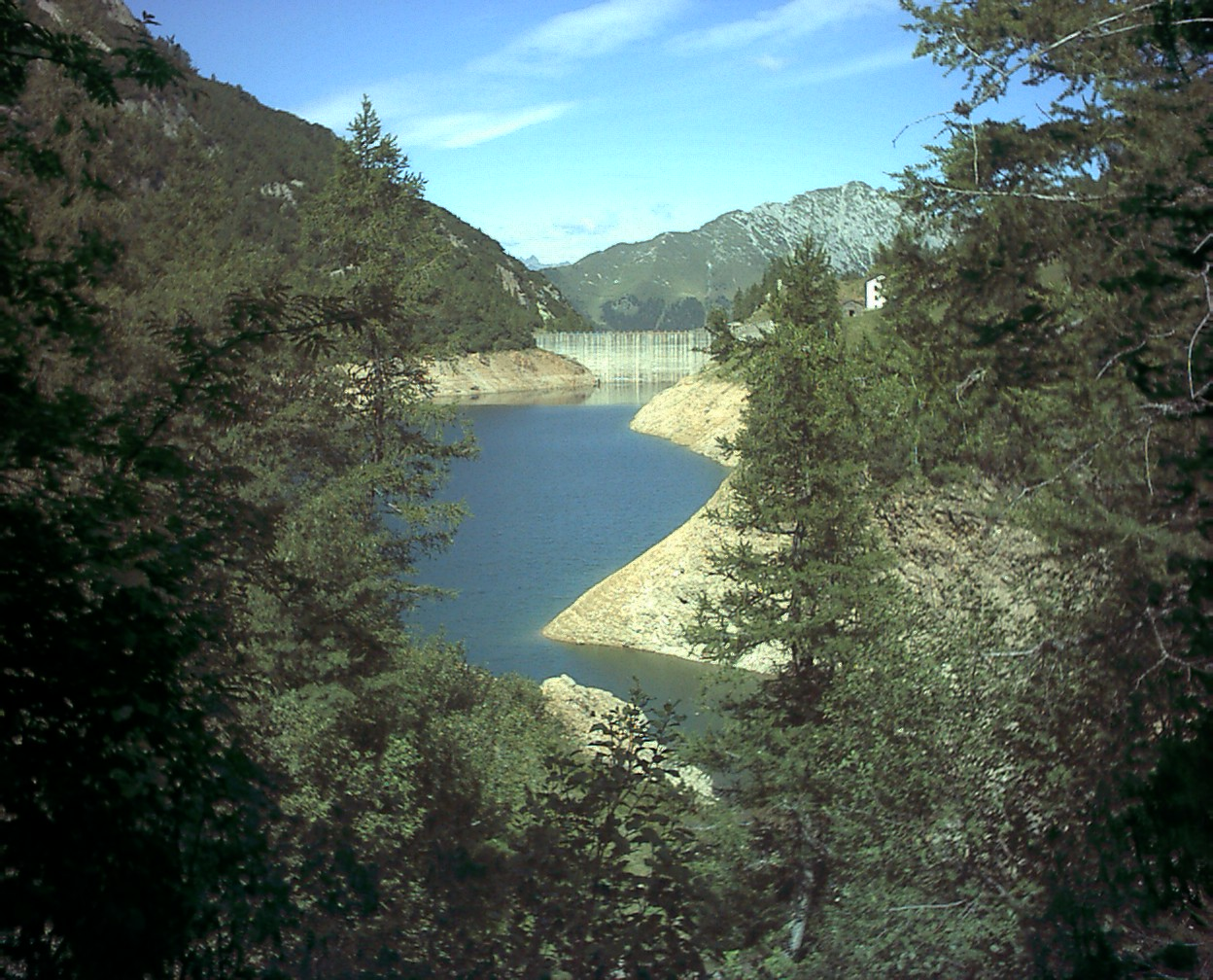

- Location within Lombardy
- Location: Province of Bergamo, Lombardy
- Coordinates: 45.9976°N 9.7915°E
- Basin countries: Italy
- Surface elevation: 1,841 m (6,040 ft)

Casere Lake is a lake in the Province of Bergamo, Lombardy, Italy. The lake is an artificial lake, and is located by the comune of Branzi.
