= Lago di Aviasco =

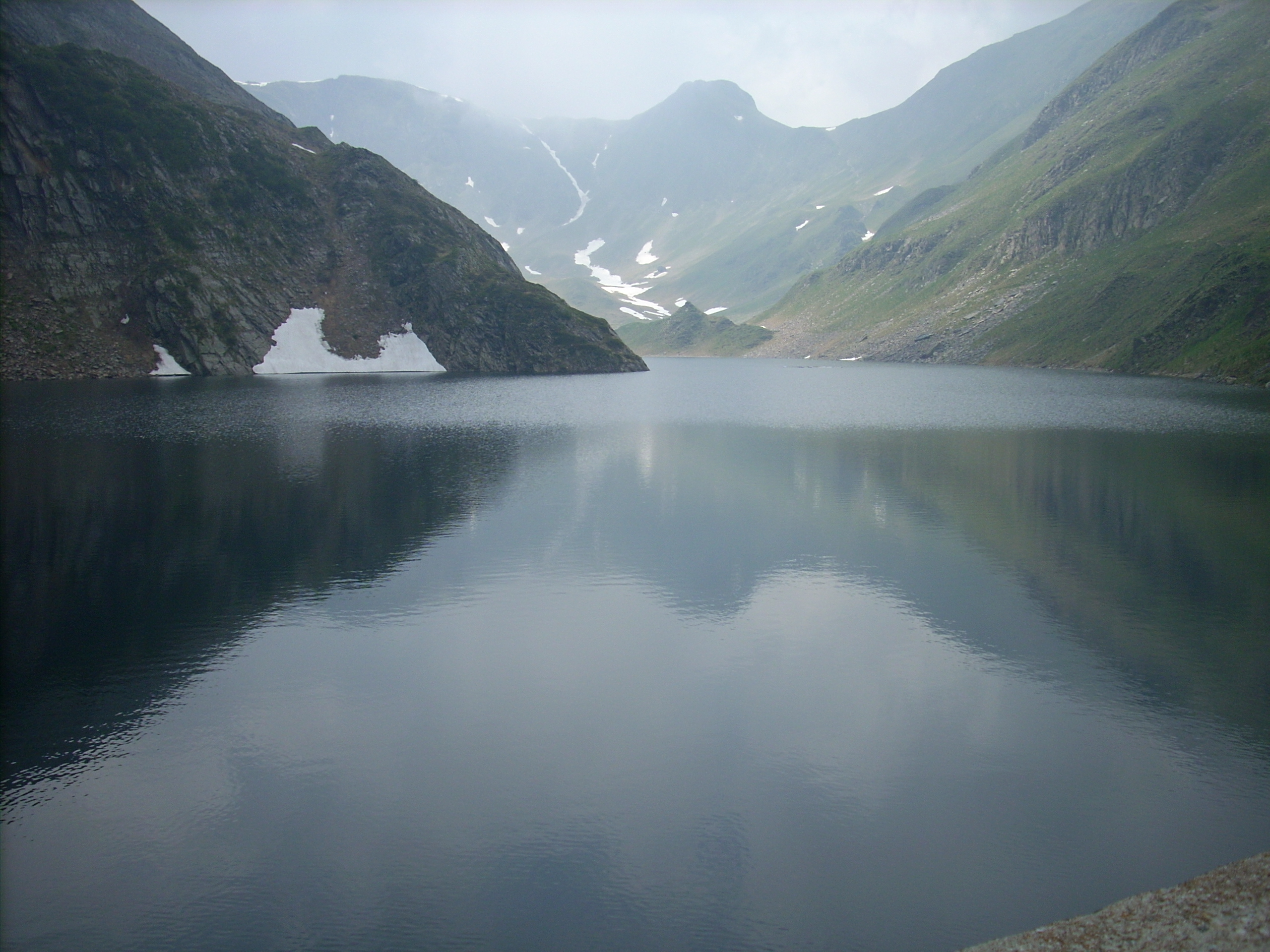

- Location within Italy
- Location: Valle Seriana, Province of Bergamo, Lombardy
- Coordinates: 46.0009°N 9.8597°E
- Type: reservoir
- Basin countries: Italy
- Surface area: 7.8 ha (19 acres)
- Surface elevation: 2,070 m (6,790 ft)

Lago di Aviasco is an artificial lake above Valgoglio in the Province of Bergamo, Lombardy, Italy.
