= Branzi =

- Comune
- Comune di Branzi
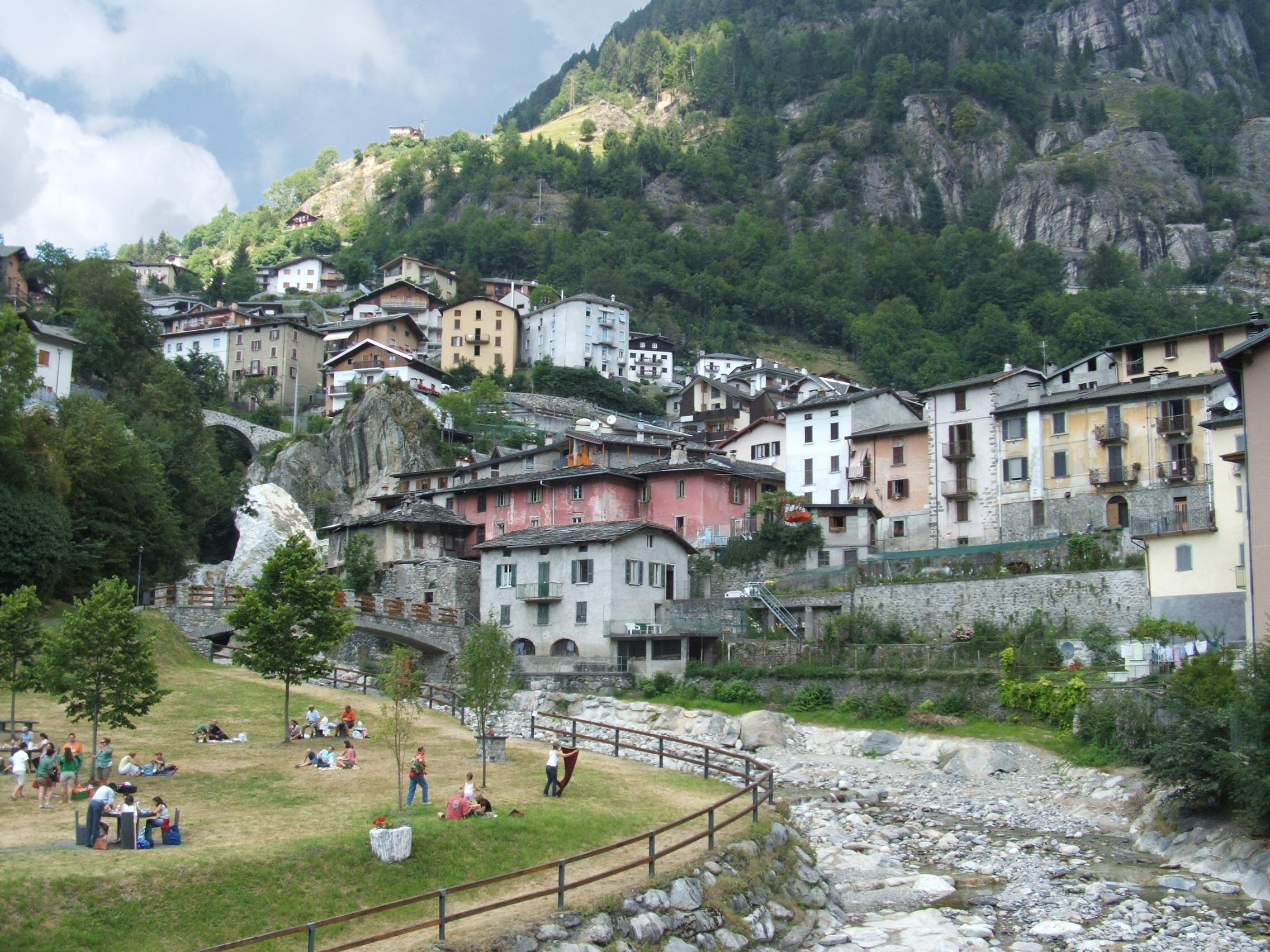
- View of Branzi

- Coat of arms

- Location within Italy Location within Lombardy
- Coordinates: 46°0′N 9°46′E
- Country: Italy
- Region: Lombardy
- Province: Bergamo (BG)

Government
  - Mayor: Gabriele Curti

Area
  - Total: 25.3 km^{2} (9.8 sq mi)
- Elevation: 874 m (2,867 ft)

Population (30 November 2016) It is located near Lago Casere.
  - Total: 715
  - Density: 28.3/km^{2} (73.2/sq mi)
- Demonym: Branzesi
- Time zone: UTC+1 (CET)
  - Summer (DST): UTC+2 (CEST)
- Postal code: 24010
- Dialing code: 0345

Branzi (Bergamasque: Bràns) is a comune (municipality) in the Province of Bergamo in the Italian region of Lombardy, located about 80 kilometres (50 mi) northeast of Milan and about 50 kilometres (31 mi) north of Bergamo.

Branzi borders the following municipalities: Ardesio, Carona, Isola di Fondra, Piazzatorre, Roncobello, Valgoglio, Valleve.
