= Oltressenda Alta =

- Comune
- Comune di Oltressenda Alta
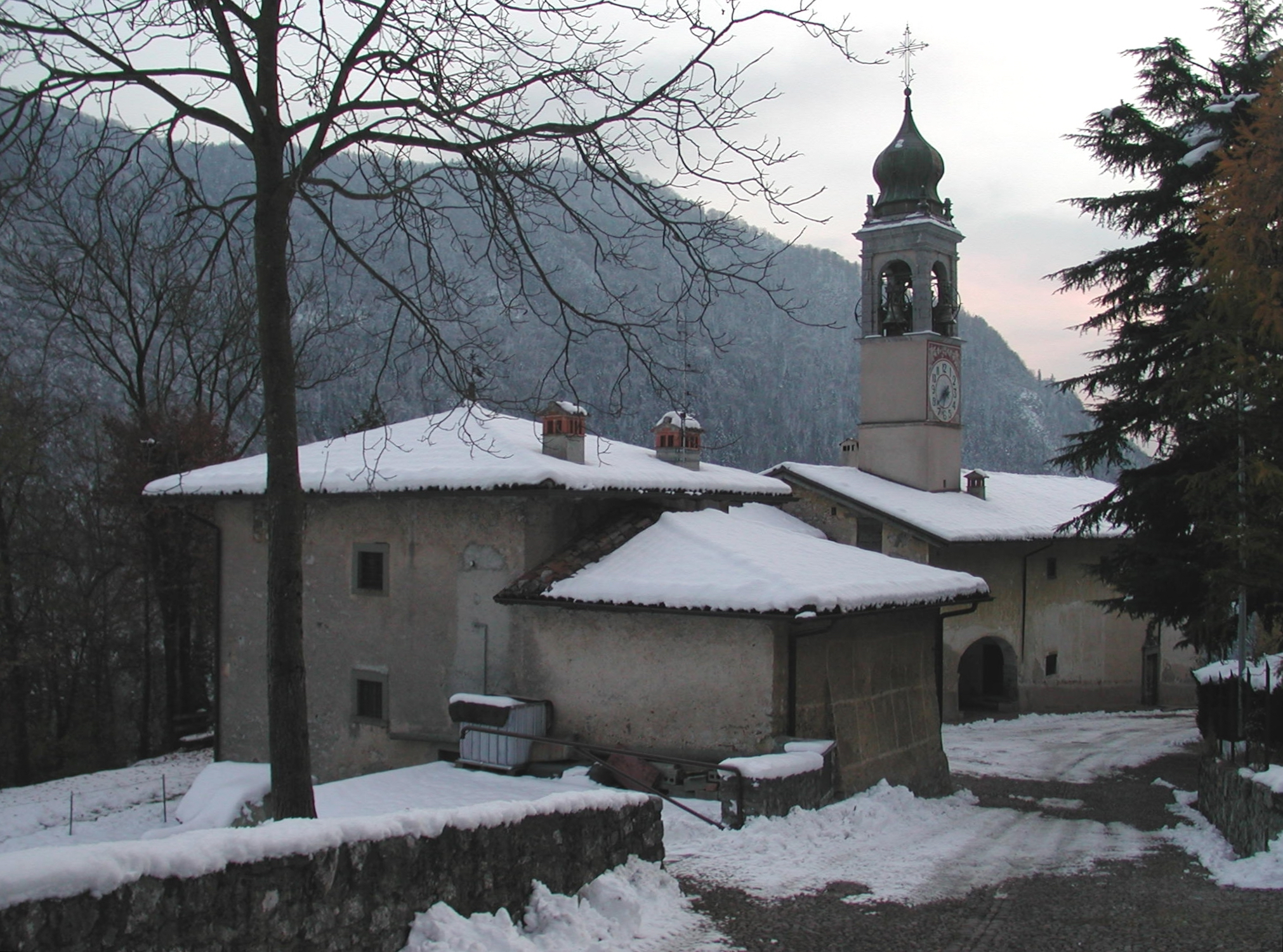
- Church

- Location within Italy Location within Lombardy
- Coordinates: 45°55′N 9°56′E
- Country: Italy
- Region: Lombardy
- Province: Province of Bergamo (BG)

Area
  - Total: 17.3 km^{2} (6.7 sq mi)
- Elevation: 714 m (2,343 ft)

Population (Dec. 2004)
  - Total: 195
  - Density: 11.3/km^{2} (29.2/sq mi)
- Demonym: Nasolinensi
- Time zone: UTC+1 (CET)
  - Summer (DST): UTC+2 (CEST)
- Postal code: 24020
- Dialing code: 0346

Oltressenda Alta (Bergamasque: Oltressènda Ólta) is a comune (municipality) in the Province of Bergamo in the Italian region of Lombardy, located about 80 kilometres (50 mi) northeast of Milan and about 30 kilometres (19 mi) northeast of Bergamo. As of 31 December 2004, it had a population of 195 and an area of 17.3 square kilometres (6.7 mi^{2}).

Oltressenda Alta borders the following municipalities: Ardesio, Clusone, Gromo, Rovetta, Villa d'Ogna, Vilminore di Scalve, Oltressenda alta has two majority localities: Nasolino and Valzurio.

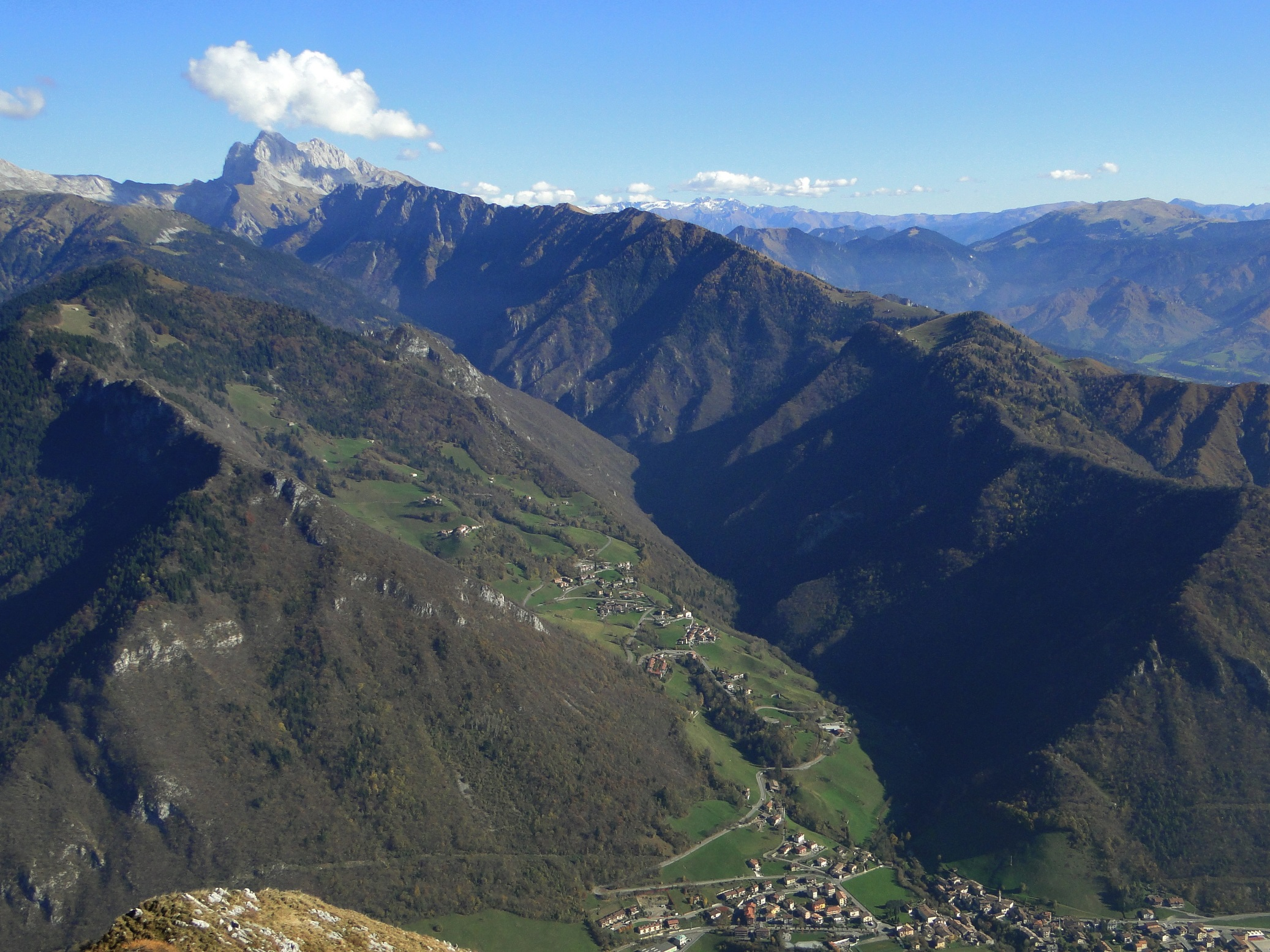
aerial view of Oltressanda Alta

== Demographic evolution ==
Historical population

Year	Pop.	±%
1861	460	—
1871	469	+2.0%
1881	492	+4.9%
1901	362	−26.4%
1911	465	+28.5%

Year	Pop.	±%
1921	408	−12.3%
1931	415	+1.7%
1936	436	+5.1%
1951	388	−11.0%
1961	324	−16.5%

Year	Pop.	±%
1971	213	−34.3%
1981	176	−17.4%
1991	185	+5.1%
2001	194	+4.9%

Source: Data from ISTAT
