= Ardesio =

- Comune
- Comune di Ardesio
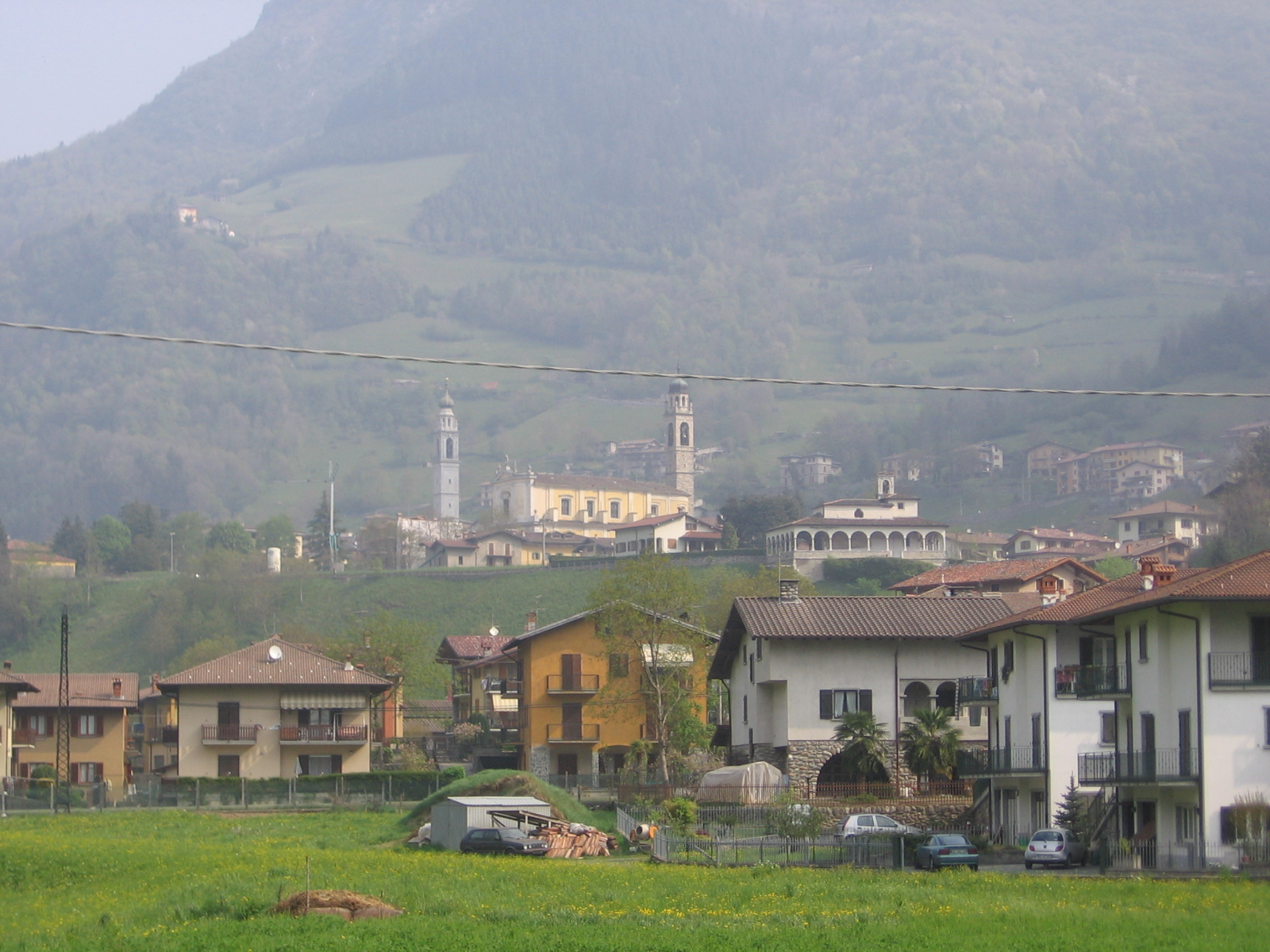
- View of Ardesio

- Coat of arms

- Location within Italy Location within Lombardy
- Coordinates: 45°56′N 9°56′E
- Country: Italy
- Region: Lombardy
- Province: Province of Bergamo (BG)
- Frazioni: Ave, Valcanale, Ludrigno, Carpignolo Ponte Seghe, More, Valzella, Zanetti, Marinoni, Cerete, Cacciamali, Piazzolo, Botto Alto, Rizzoli, Bani, Babes, Valle, Albareti

Government
  - Mayor: Yvan Caccia

Area
  - Total: 53.76 km^{2} (20.76 sq mi)
- Highest elevation: 1,603 m (5,259 ft)
- Lowest elevation: 475 m (1,558 ft)

Population (30 November 2016)
  - Total: 3,483
  - Density: 64.79/km^{2} (167.8/sq mi)
- Demonym: Ardesiani
- Time zone: UTC+1 (CET)
  - Summer (DST): UTC+2 (CEST)
- Postal code: 24020
- Dialing code: 0346
- Patron saint: San Giorgio
- Saint day: 23 April
- Website: Official website

Ardesio (Bergamasque: Ardés) is a comune in the province of Bergamo, in Lombardy, Italy.

== Events ==
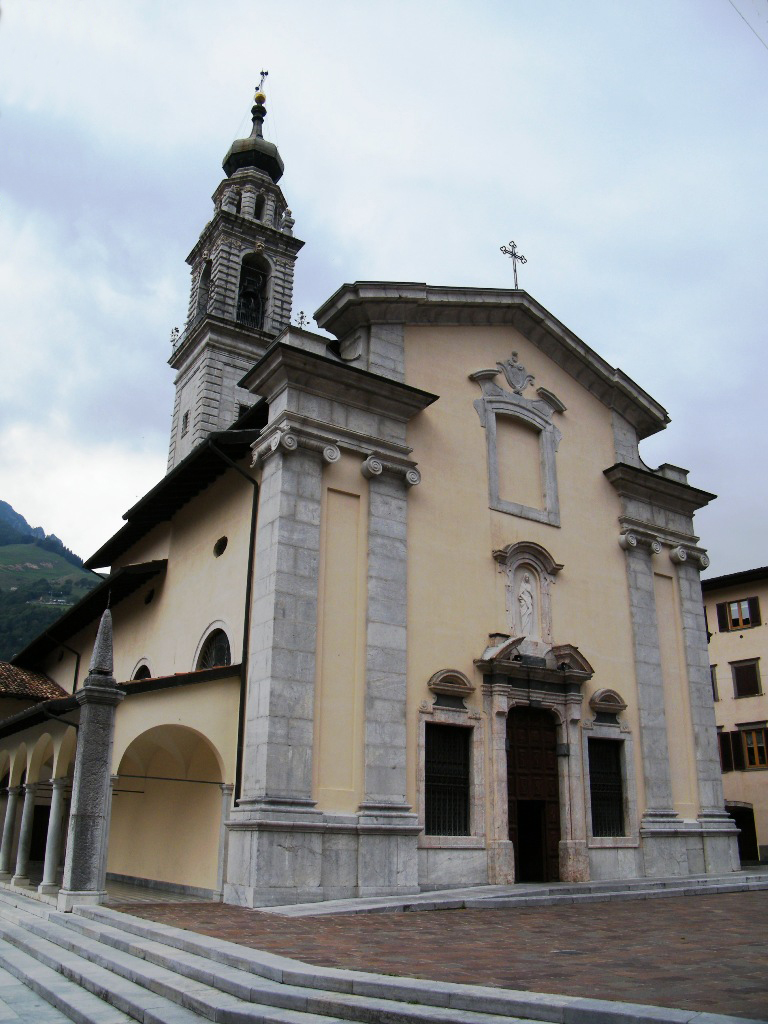
the Sanctuary Madonna delle Grazie.

On the last Sunday of January the people of Ardesio have an exhibition with several kinds of goats and donkeys.

Every 31 January there is "La scasada dol zenerù" (the chasing of January). On this day they celebrate the end of the cold season. A puppet representing January is burnt at the city hall.

On 23 June people celebrate the anniversary of the Virgin apparition. This event commemorates two girls seeing the Virgin Mary in 1607. A procession is held with a statue representing the Virgin, the two girls and the baby Jesus.

== Bounding communes ==
- Valgoglio
- Gromo
- Oltressenda Alta
- Villa d'Ogna
- Parre
- Premolo
- Oltre il Colle
- Roncobello
- Branzi
