= Schilpario =

- Comune
- Comune di Schilpario
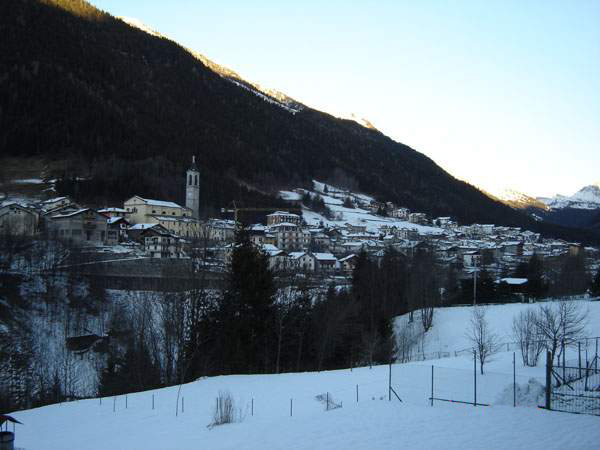
- Schilpario

- Location within Italy Location within Lombardy
- Coordinates: 46°1′N 10°9′E
- Country: Italy
- Region: Lombardy
- Province: Bergamo (BG)
- Frazioni: Ronco, Barzesto, Pradella

Government
  - Mayor: Marco Pizio

Area
  - Total: 63.8 km^{2} (24.6 sq mi)
- Elevation: 1,124 m (3,688 ft)

Population (1 April 2014)
  - Total: 1,236
  - Density: 19.4/km^{2} (50.2/sq mi)
- Demonym: Schilpariesi
- Time zone: UTC+1 (CET)
  - Summer (DST): UTC+2 (CEST)
- Postal code: 24020
- Dialing code: 0346
- Website: Official website

Schilpario (Lombard: Scülpér, or Schilpér) is a comune (municipality) in the Province of Bergamo in the Italian region of Lombardy, located about 100 kilometres (62 mi) northeast of Milan and about 50 kilometres (31 mi) northeast of Bergamo.

Schilpario borders the following municipalities: Azzone, Borno, Cerveno, Lozio, Ossimo, Paisco Loveno, Teglio, Vilminore di Scalve.

Schilpario is a mountain tourist destination during summer and during winter. Schilpario hosts alpine ski and cross-country ski facilities.
