= Palazzo Besta =

Coordinates: 46.1706°N 10.0608°E

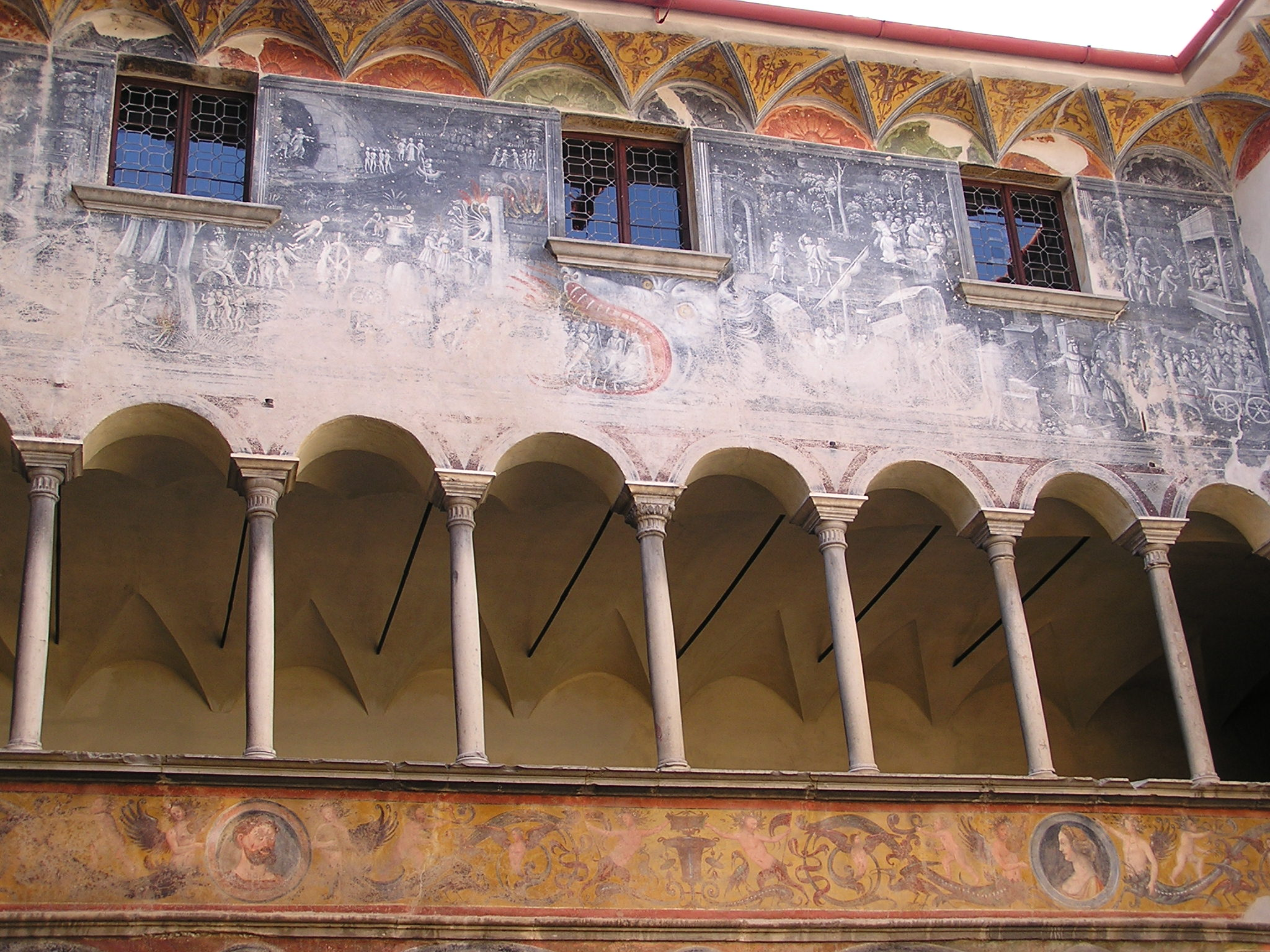
Frescoed court in Palazzo Besta.

Palazzo Besta is a Renaissance building in Teglio, in the province of Sondrio, Lombardy, northern Italy.

It was built by the Besta family around 1433, commissioned by Azzo I and Azzo II Besta, perhaps over a pre-existing medieval edifice. Later it was owned by the Guicciardi, Quadrio and Parravicini families. It is now owned by the government of the province of Lombardy.

The interior has a rectangular court with a double loggia, frescoed walls (c. 1540-1630) and an octagonal well. In the first floor, all the rooms are frescoed with mythological themes, most of them from the Aeneid, the Orlando Furioso and the Bible. One, by Giuseppe Prina, portrays the Queen of Sheba received by King Solomon.

In the lower ground is housed the "Antiquarium Tellinum" Museum, housing prehistorical slabs.
