= Azzone =

Azzone Sù (Lombard)
- Comune
- Comune di Azzone
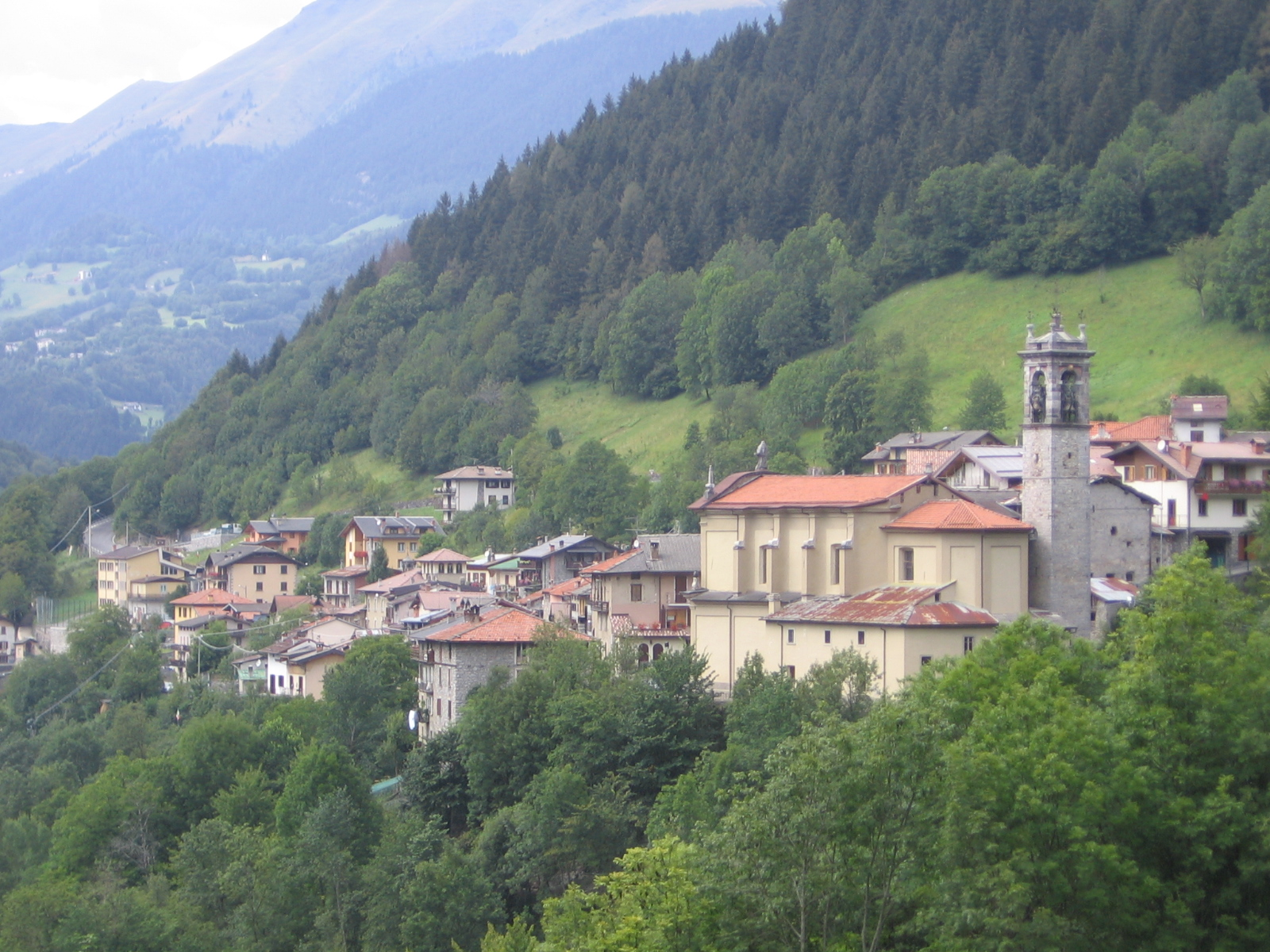
- View of Azzone

- Location within Italy Location within Lombardy
- Coordinates: 45°59′N 10°7′E
- Country: Italy
- Region: Lombardy
- Province: Province of Bergamo (BG)

Area
  - Total: 16.8 km^{2} (6.5 sq mi)
- Elevation: 973 m (3,192 ft)

Population (Dec. 2004)
  - Total: 458
  - Density: 27.3/km^{2} (70.6/sq mi)
- Demonym: Azzonesi
- Time zone: UTC+1 (CET)
  - Summer (DST): UTC+2 (CEST)
- Postal code: 24020
- Dialing code: 0346

Azzone (Italian: [atˈtsoːne]; Bergamasque: Sù) is a comune (municipality) in the Province of Bergamo in the Italian region of Lombardy, located about 90 kilometres (56 mi) northeast of Milan and about 45 kilometres (28 mi) northeast of Bergamo. As of 31 December 2004, it had a population of 458 and an area of 16.8 square kilometres (6.5 mi^{2}).

Azzone borders the following municipalities: Angolo Terme, Borno, Colere, Schilpario, Vilminore di Scalve.

== Demographic evolution ==
Historical population

| Year | Pop. | ±% |
|---|---|---|
| 1861 | 771 | — |
| 1871 | 802 | +4.0% |
| 1881 | 833 | +3.9% |
| 1901 | 746 | −10.4% |
| 1911 | 787 | +5.5% |

| Year | Pop. | ±% |
|---|---|---|
| 1921 | 775 | −1.5% |
| 1931 | 632 | −18.5% |
| 1936 | 808 | +27.8% |
| 1951 | 858 | +6.2% |
| 1961 | 844 | −1.6% |

| Year | Pop. | ±% |
|---|---|---|
| 1971 | 698 | −17.3% |
| 1981 | 618 | −11.5% |
| 1991 | 530 | −14.2% |
| 2001 | 490 | −7.5% |
| 2011 | 433 | −11.6% |

Source: Data from ISTAT

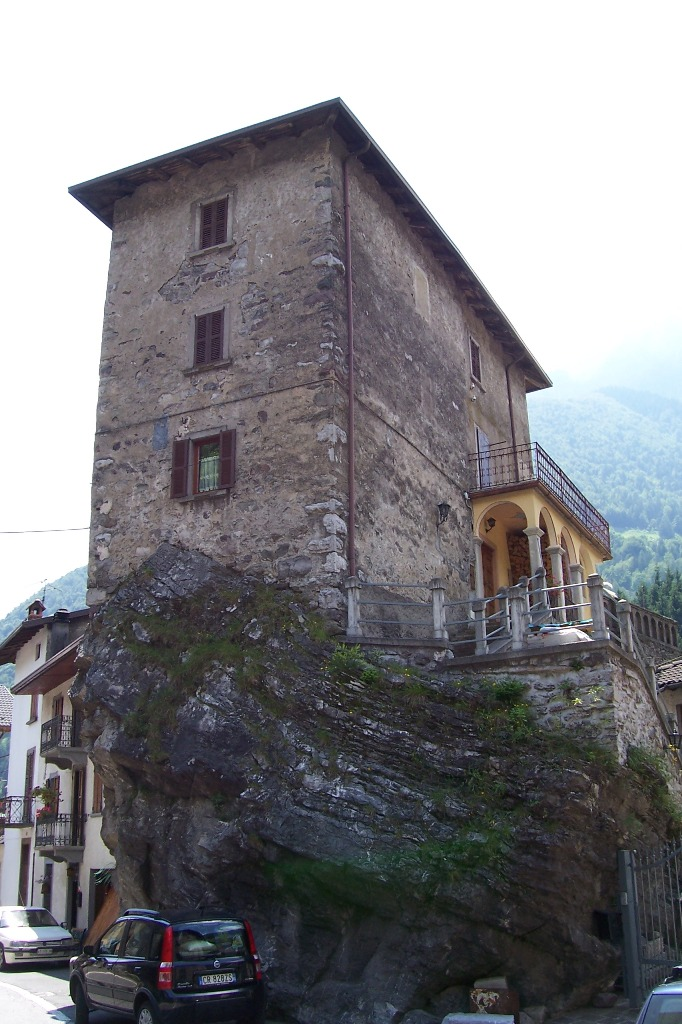
House on the cliff in Dezzo

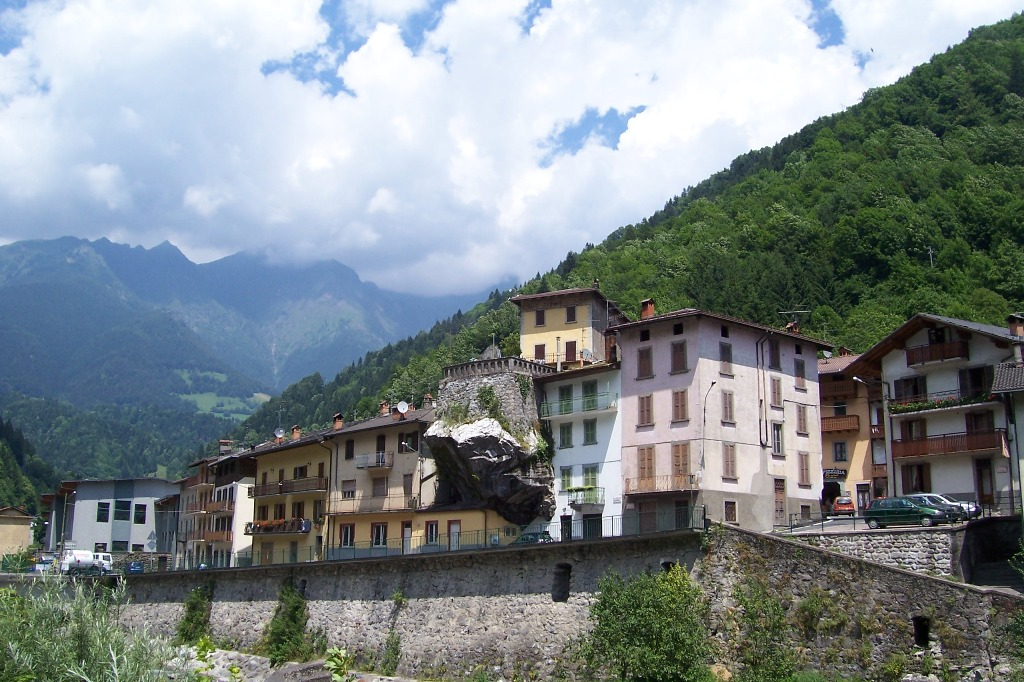
Country of Dezzo
