= Andrea Tonoli =

Italian composer and musician (born 1991)

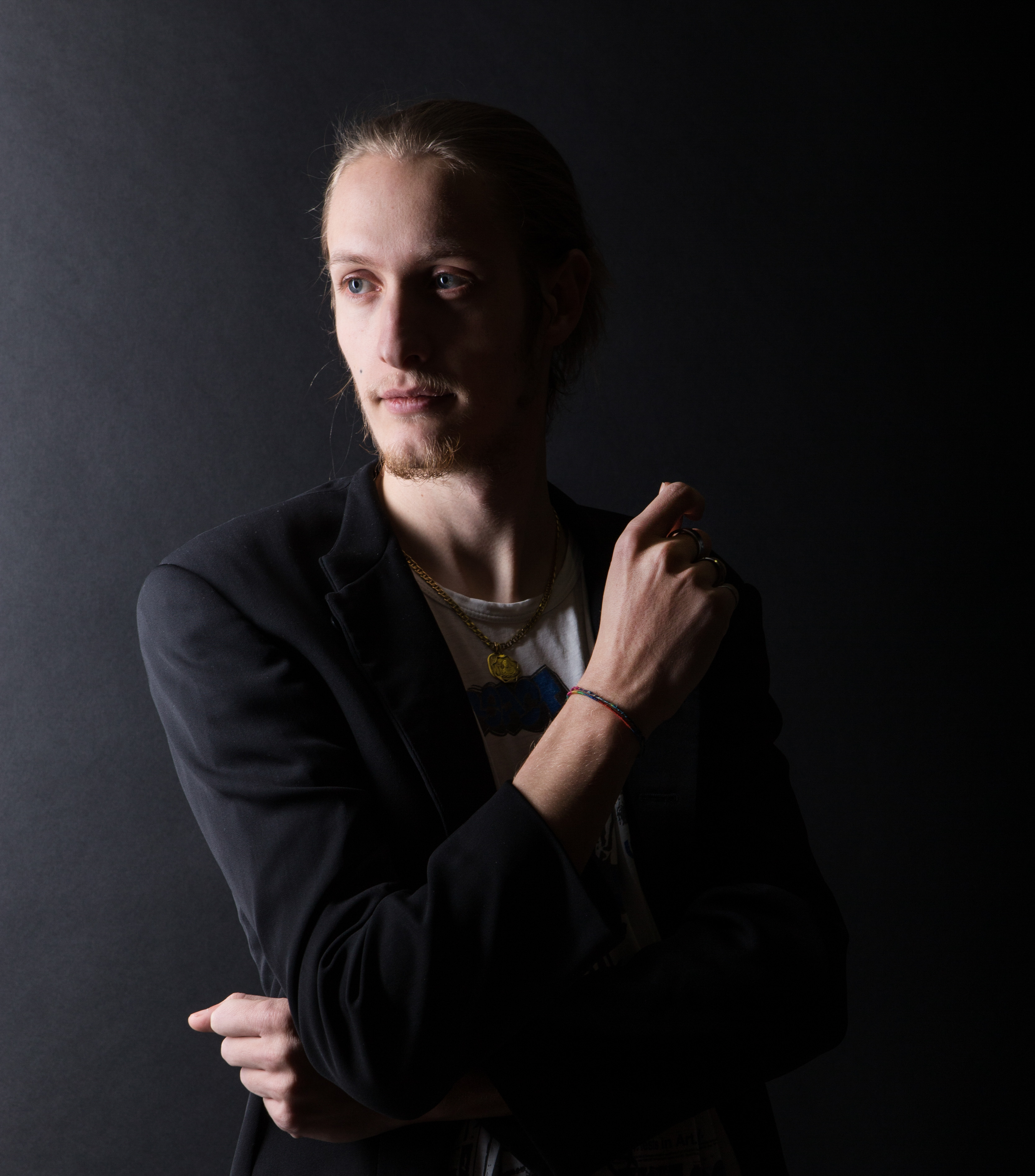
- Andrea Tonoli, portrait by Roberto Magli Photography

Background information
- Born: February 6, 1991 (age 35); Bergamo, Italy
- Origin: Italy
- Genres: Minimalist music, Contemporary classical music, Film score
- Occupations: Composer, musician
- Instruments: Piano, Violin, Guitar, Drums, Synthesizer, Rhodes
- Years active: 2012–present
- Website: www.andreatonoli.com

Andrea Tonoli (born 6 February 1991, in Gandellino) is an Italian composer and musician, active in different genres including contemporary classical music, film music and post-rock.

== Early life ==
Born in Gandellino, near Bergamo, Italy, Tonoli started his music career at the age of 15. Refusing to take music lessons, he continued to play for many years as a self taught musician.

== Career ==
Listening to Ryuichi Sakamoto, Yiruma, Yann Tiersen and Ludovico Einaudi led Tonoli to compose a few songs, which in 2012 were released as his first album, Human.

In 2013, he lost his father due to a serious disease and that led him to stay out of the music world for a while. After some months he wrote and recorded his 2nd album, Human B-Side. He started a netlabel the same year.

In April 2014, he went to London to perform at "Ont'Sofa" at the Gibson HQ.

Tonoli released his first music video on December 19, 2014, for the song "Aurora". This song was the first track from his fourth album, Met by the Moonlight, which was released the same month. From the beginning of 2015, he started touring Italy with Met by the Moonlight, and in February he released his first official collection Ace of Hearts. In February 2015, he earned his first nomination for an international award, the Hollywood Music in Media Awards as the best New Age Artist of the Year with the song "Aurora".

Tonoli stayed in Hollywood for the entire month of November, composing his new album and attending the awards. On December 21, 2015, he released a Special Edition of Met by the Moonlight. In 2016 he started a "comeback" tour in Italy, starting from his hometown, Gandellino.

From 2014 to 2016, he's been a member of the Post-Rock Italian band L.E.D.

In 2017 he released his new album Anarchangel Vol.1 which he took on tour for the entire year in Europe.

After the release of Anarchangel Vol.1 his music has been used in projects by Paul Nicklen and National Geographic, Vogue (magazine), and entered the movie industry, with songs being used and licensed as official soundtracks all over the world, as in Ephemere: La Bellezza Inevitabile and many others.

In 2018 he published his first autobiographical book: "Tra Ali e Cenere: Diario di un giovane sogno" which was then translated into an English version: Of Wings and Ashes: tales of a neverending dream, printed and distributed by Amazon (company).

In 2018 his song "South Cross Prayer" became the soundtrack of a viral video about time by Jay Shetty making the song viral in Asia, where it got licensed for many advs, TV series and commercials in the next years, as in China with The Oath of Love "Production Special" (2021) and Zwilling J. A. Henckels adv (2020) or in South Korea with Wonderwall Acting Masterclass (2021) with Ha Jung-woo and the third episode of Lee Min-ho X Lee Seung-gi webseries (2020).

From 2019 to 2021 Andrea released some singles which will then become part of his 7th album: Anarchangel Vol.2: "Fade", "Cartagena", "Blossom", "The Swan", "Di seta è il vento".

The full album will be released in January 2023.

== Discography ==
- 2012 Human
- 2013 Human B-Side
- 2014 Met by the Moonlight
- 2015 Collections Vol.1: Ace of Hearts
- 2015 Met by the Moonlight: Special Edition
- 2017 Anarchangel Vol.1
- 2023 Anarchangel Vol.2
