= Carona, Lombardy =

Carona
- Comune
- Comune di Carona
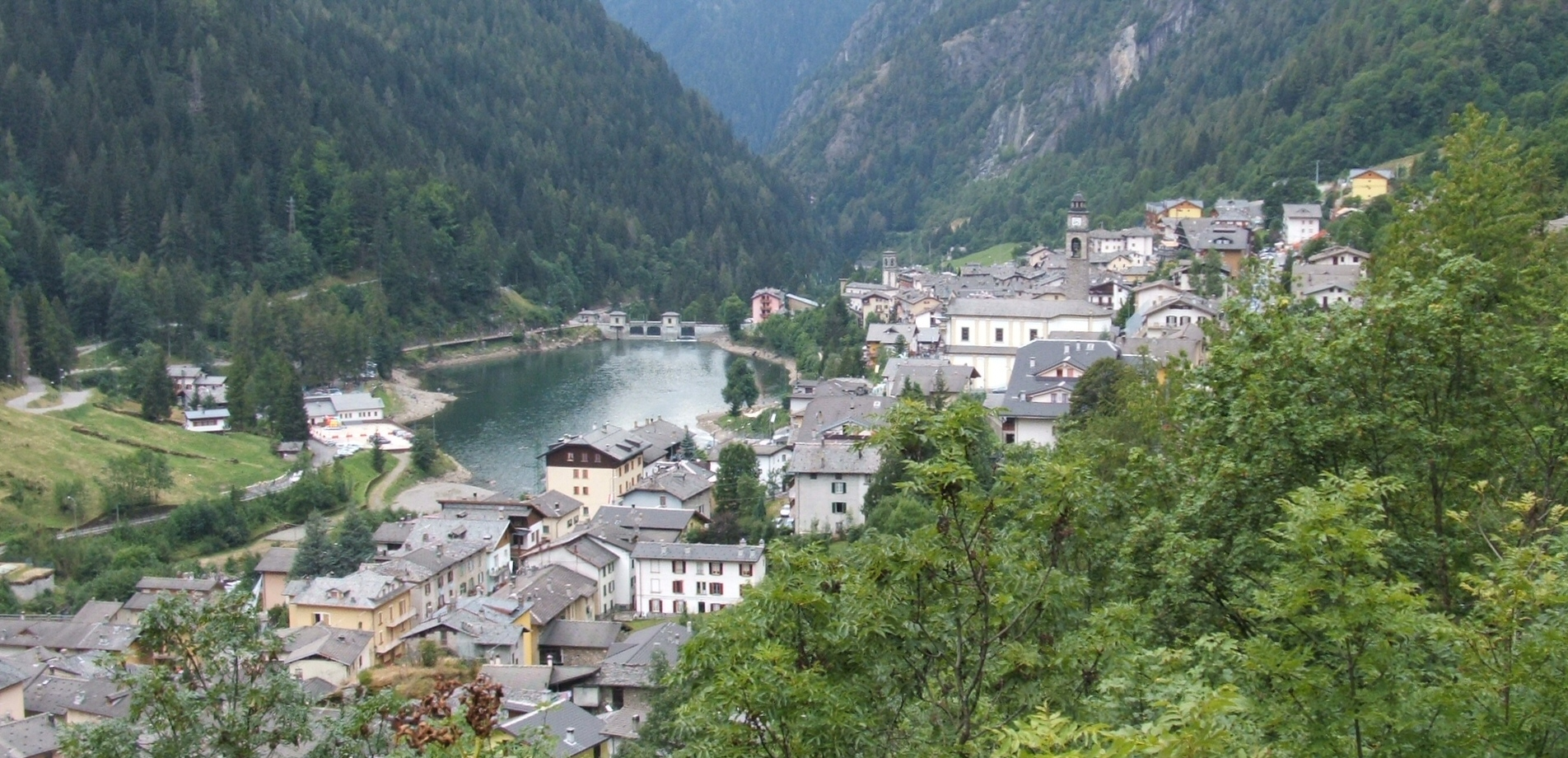
- Carona

- Coat of arms

- Location within Italy Location within Lombardy
- Coordinates: 46°1′N 9°47′E
- Country: Italy
- Region: Lombardy
- Province: Bergamo (BG)
- Frazioni: Flumenero, Pagliari, Porta

Government
  - Mayor: Giancarlo Pedretti

Area
  - Total: 44.0 km^{2} (17.0 sq mi)
- Elevation: 1,110 m (3,640 ft)

Population (30 November 2016)
  - Total: 327
  - Density: 7.43/km^{2} (19.2/sq mi)
- Demonym: Caronelli
- Time zone: UTC+1 (CET)
  - Summer (DST): UTC+2 (CEST)
- Postal code: 24010
- Dialing code: 0345
- Patron saint: St. John the Baptist
- Saint day: 24 June

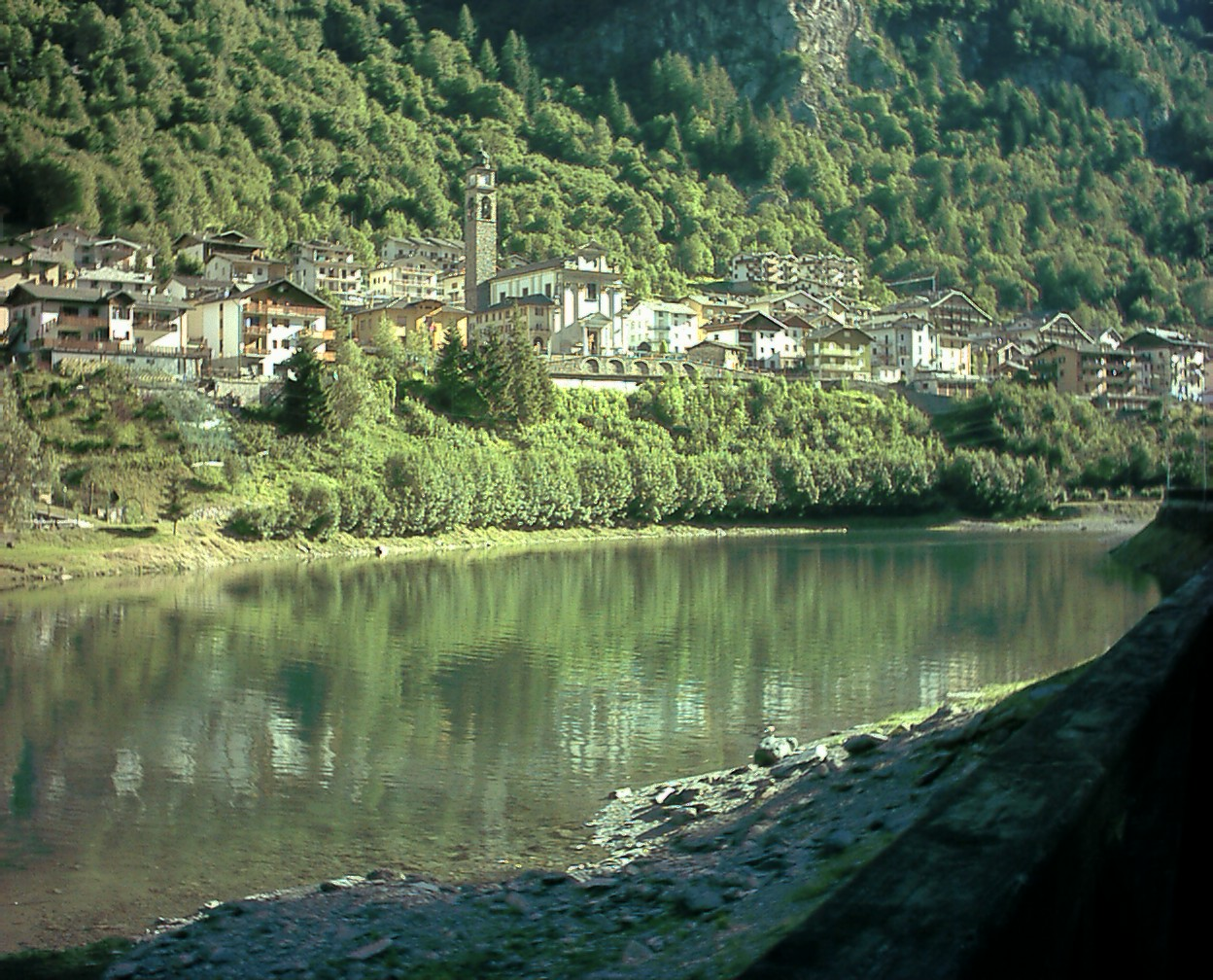
Carona and its lake

Carona (Bergamasque: Caruna) is a comune (municipality) in the Province of Bergamo in the Italian region of Lombardy, located about 80 kilometres (50 mi) northeast of Milan and about 35 kilometres (22 mi) north of Bergamo. By the statute of Carona, on its territory there are no hamlets, but it still recognises the localities of Carona Bassa and Pagliari.

Carona borders the following municipalities: Branzi, Caiolo, Foppolo, Gandellino, Piateda, Valbondione, Valgoglio, Valleve.

== See also ==
- Lake dei Frati
