= Laghi Gemelli =

Lake in Lombardy, Italy

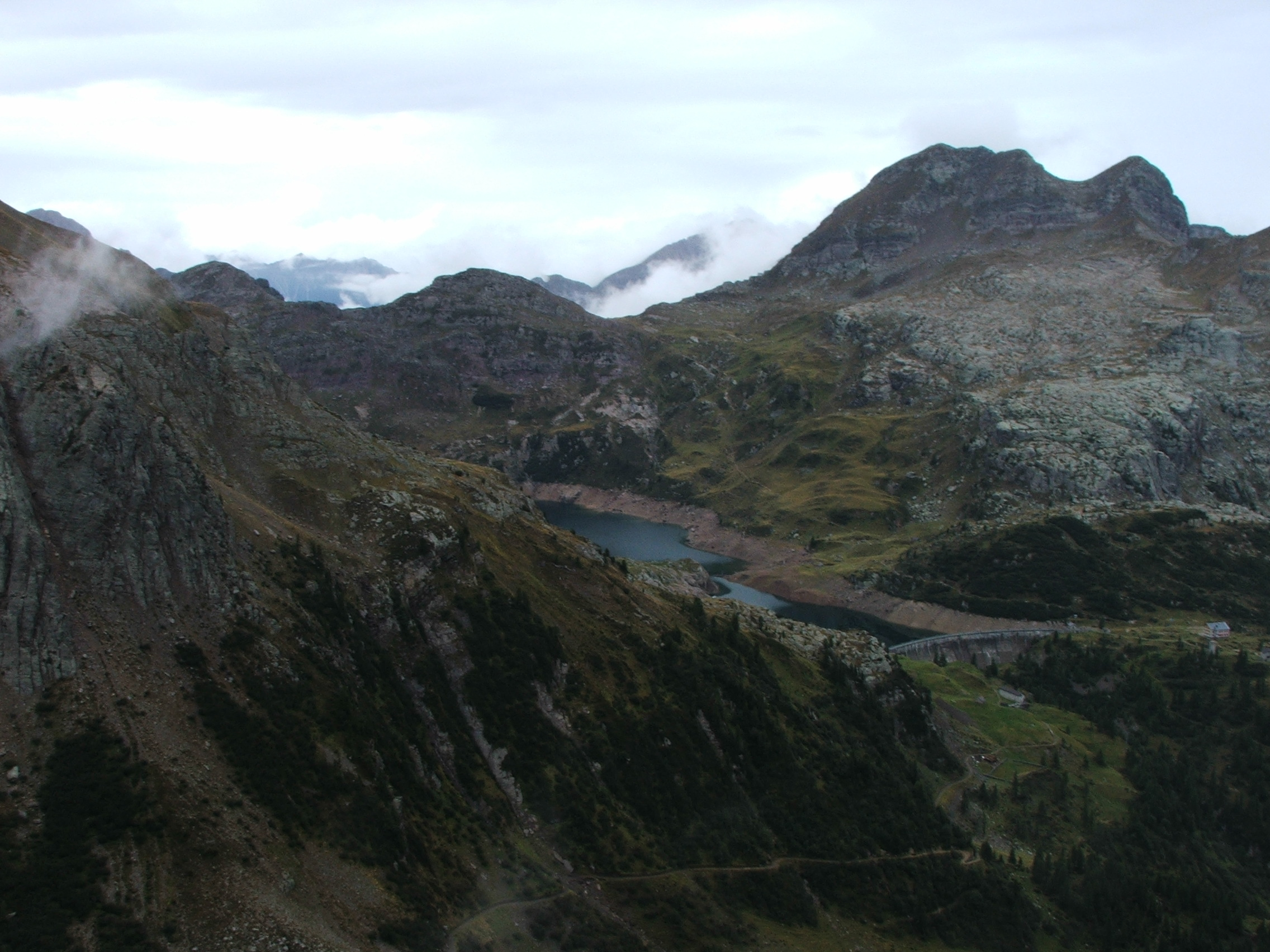

- Location within Lombardy
- Location: Province of Bergamo, Lombardy
- Coordinates: 45°59′14″N 09°48′26″E
- Basin countries: Italy
- Surface elevation: 1,952 m (6,404 ft)

Laghi Gemelli is a reservoir lake in the Val Brembana in the Province of Bergamo, Lombardy, Italy. The lake's name literally means "Twin Lakes", as it was originally split into two separate lakes prior to the construction of a dam on the lake. The lake's two basins can still be seen when the reservoir water levels are low. It is a popular hiking destination.
