= Condemnation to the mines =

Roman-era punishment

Condemnation to the mines (Latin: Ad metalla, "to the mines") was a punishment that was most notably applied to senior Christian figures in the early Christian period in the Roman Empire, when it was called "Damnatio ad metalla". It was a penal sentence of forced labor in state owned mines often until death. It was also applied to slaves, war captives and criminals. Both Tertullian and Cyprian described it as a type of prolonged killing.

== Notable figures who were punished with condemnation to the mines ==
- Pope Pontian (Saint) died in 235, condemned to mines in Sardinia
- Silvanus of Gaza (Bishop of Gaza) condemned to the copper mines of Phaeno
- Saints Peleus and Nilus, condemned to the copper mines of Phaeno

== Sources ==
- Gustafson, Mark (1994). "Condemnation to the Mines in the Later Roman Empire". The Harvard Theological Review. 87 (4): 421–433. doi:10.1017/S0017816000030212. ISSN 0017-8160. JSTOR 1509967. S2CID 163670384.
