= Gandellino =

- Comune
- Comune di Gandellino
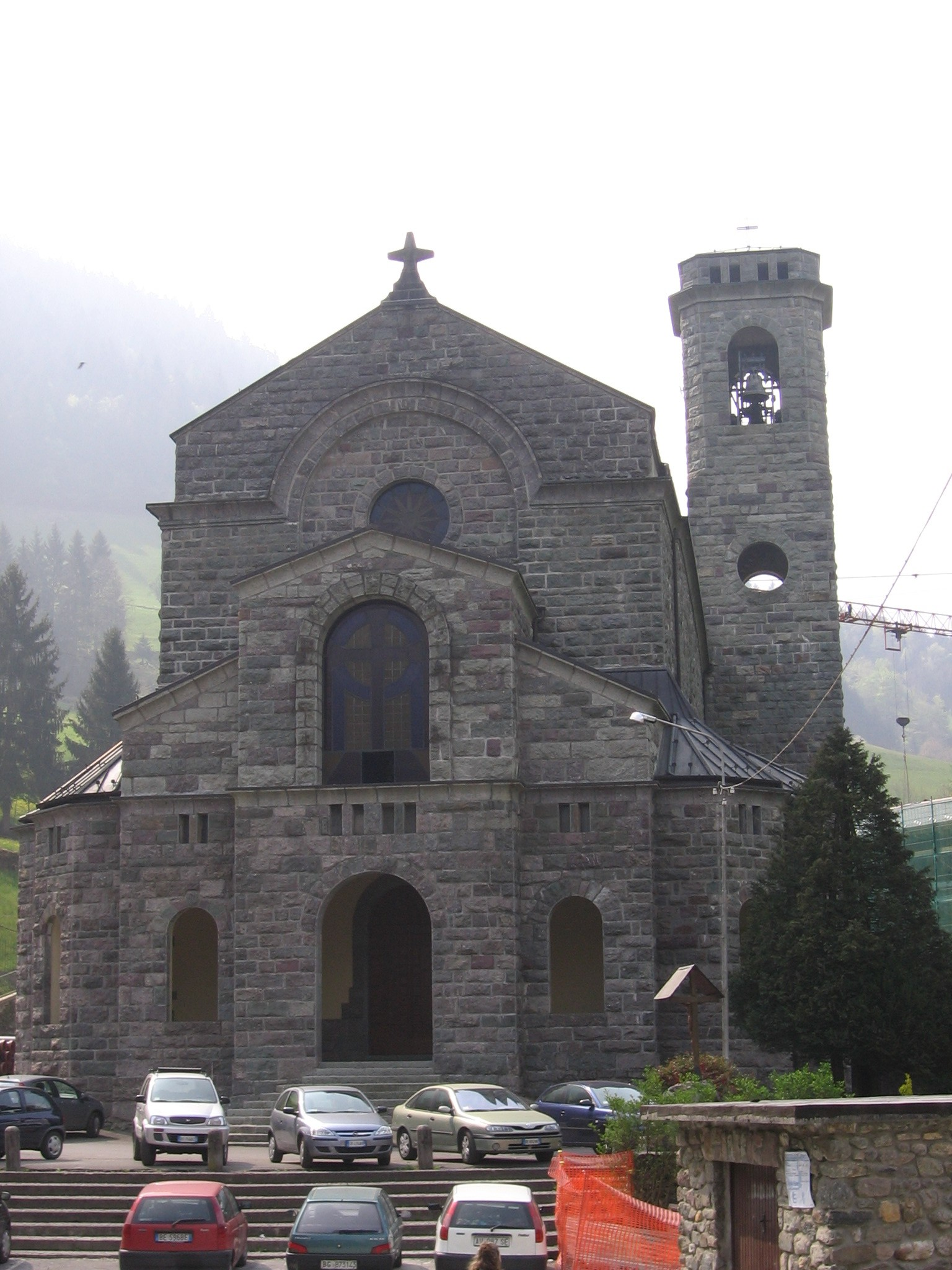
- Church

- Location within Italy Location within Lombardy
- Coordinates: 46°0′N 9°57′E
- Country: Italy
- Region: Lombardy
- Province: Bergamo (BG)
- Frazioni: Foppi, Gromo San Marino (including Bocchetta, Bondo, Grabiasca, Legnaro, Pietra, Ronchello), Tezzi

Government
  - Mayor: Flora Donatella Fiorina

Area
  - Total: 25.4 km^{2} (9.8 sq mi)
- Elevation: 675 m (2,215 ft)

Population (30 June 2011)
  - Total: 1,058
  - Density: 41.7/km^{2} (108/sq mi)
- Demonym: Gandellinesi
- Time zone: UTC+1 (CET)
  - Summer (DST): UTC+2 (CEST)
- Postal code: 24020
- Dialing code: 0346

Gandellino (Bergamasque: Gandilì) is a comune (municipality) in the Province of Bergamo in the Italian region of Lombardy, located about 90 kilometres (56 mi) northeast of Milan and about 40 kilometres (25 mi) northeast of Bergamo.

Gandellino borders the following municipalities: Carona, Gromo, Valbondione, Valgoglio.

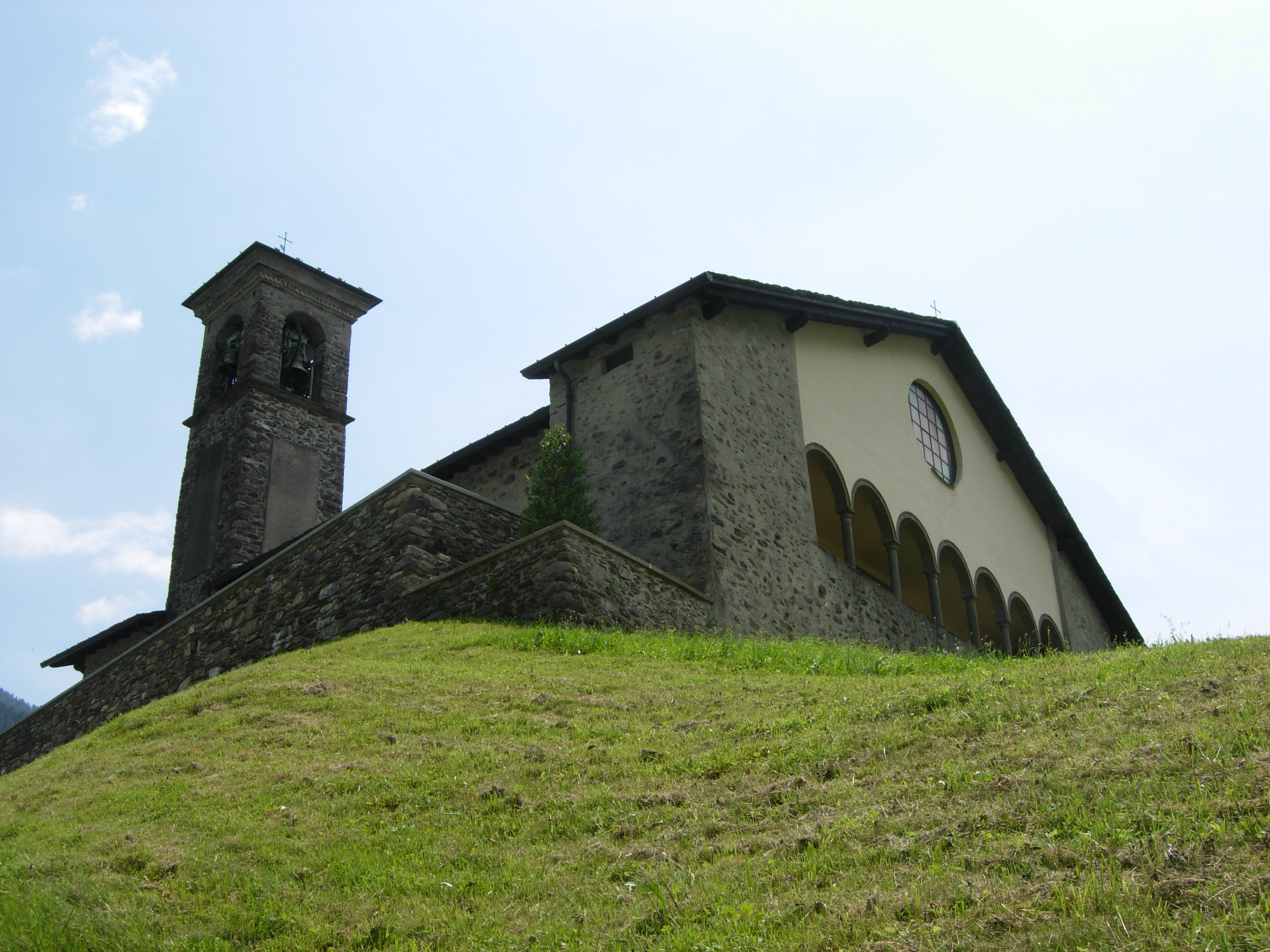
Parish church
