= Colombo Lake =

Lake in Lombardy, Italy

Lago Colombo
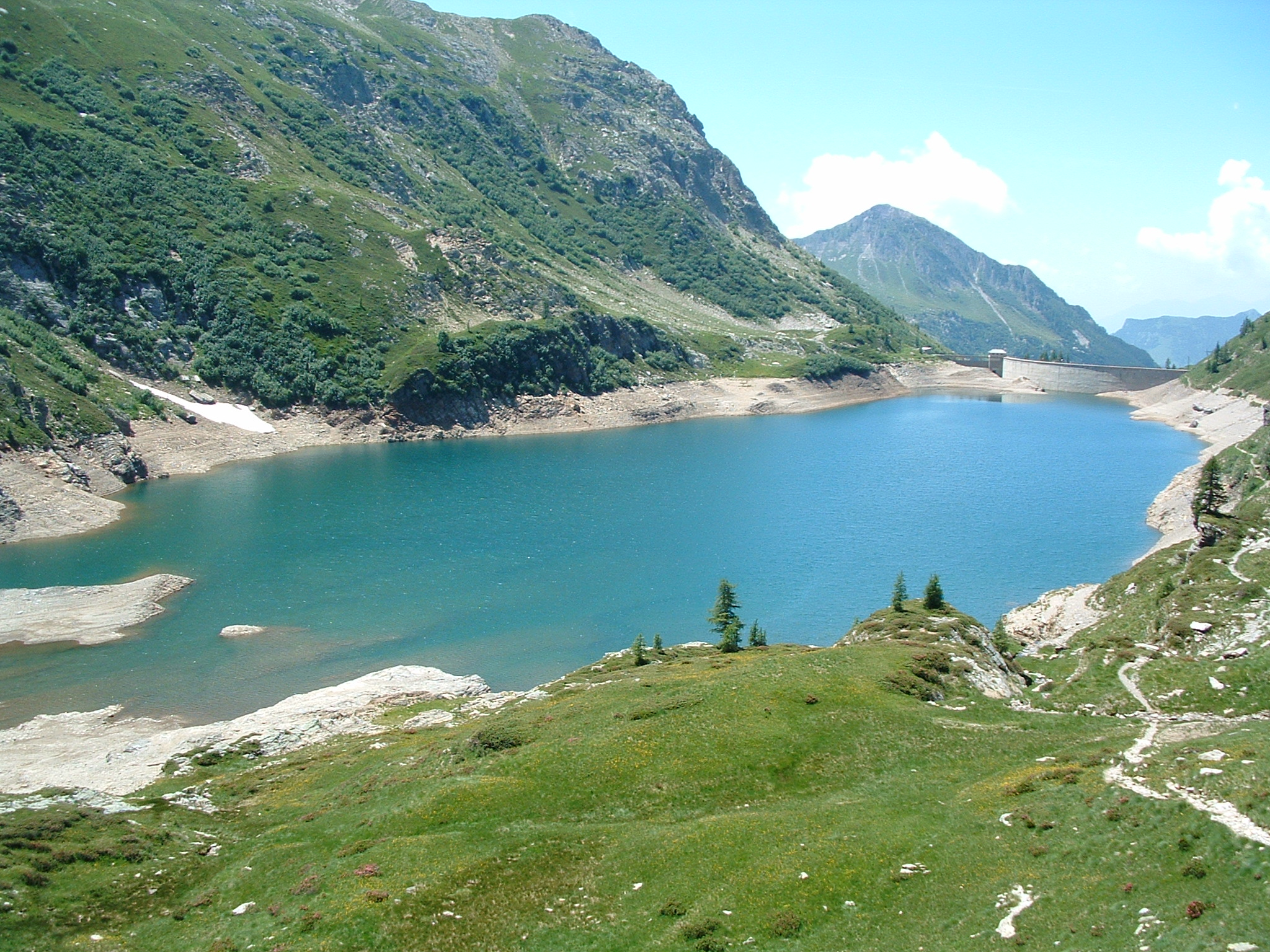

- Location within Lombardy
- Location: Province of Bergamo, Lombardy
- Coordinates: 45.997°N 9.825°E
- Basin countries: Italy
- Surface elevation: 2,046 m (6,713 ft)

Lago Colombo is a lake in the Province of Bergamo, Lombardy, Italy.
