= Valgoglio =

- Comune
- Comune di Valgoglio
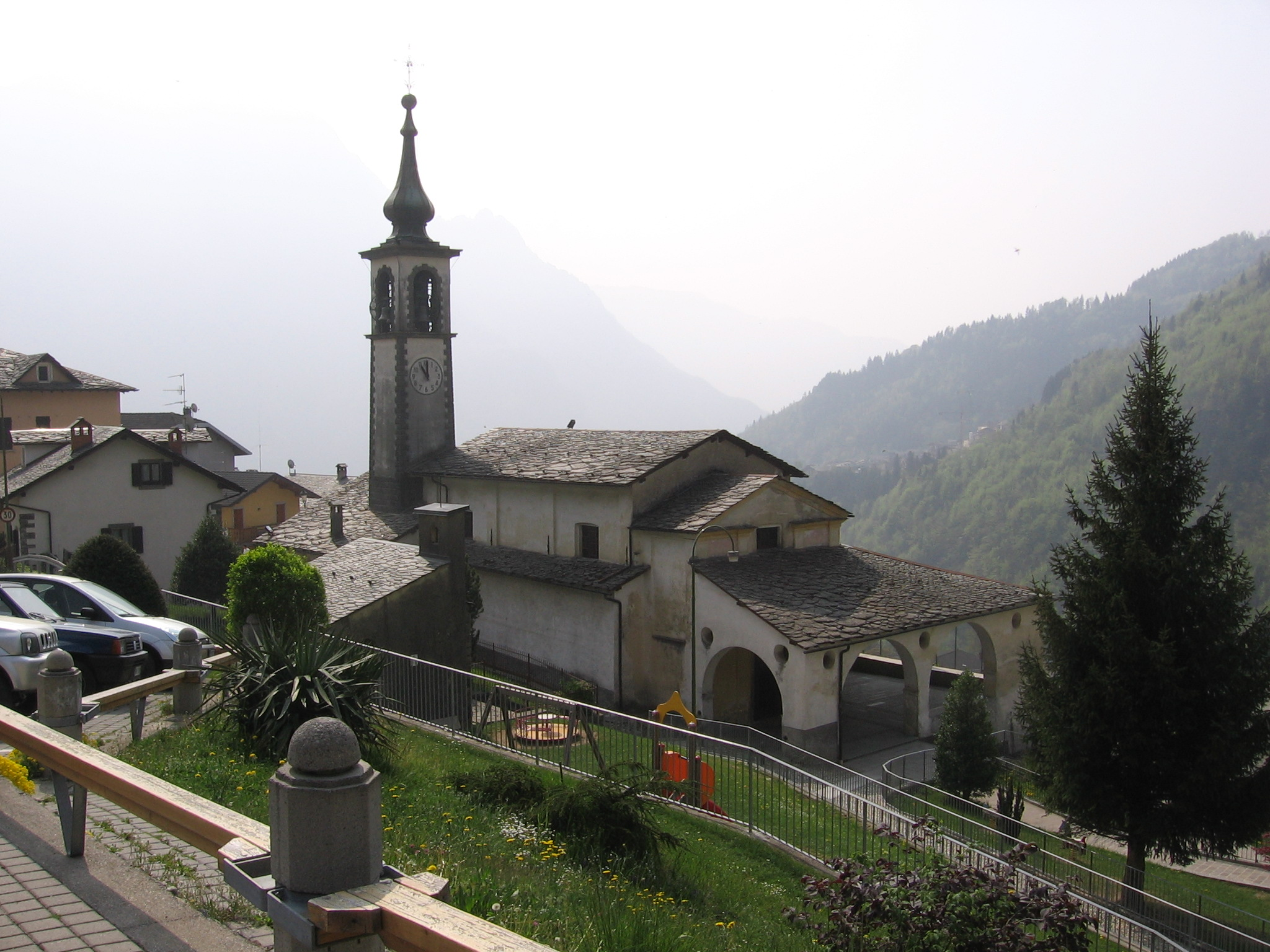
- Church

- Coat of arms

- Location within Italy Location within Lombardy
- Coordinates: 45°58′N 9°55′E
- Country: Italy
- Region: Lombardy
- Province: Bergamo (BG)

Government
  - Mayor: Eli Pedretti

Area
  - Total: 31.8 km^{2} (12.3 sq mi)
- Elevation: 929 m (3,048 ft)

Population (31 December 2010)
  - Total: 616
  - Density: 19.4/km^{2} (50.2/sq mi)
- Demonym: Valgogliesi
- Time zone: UTC+1 (CET)
  - Summer (DST): UTC+2 (CEST)
- Postal code: 24020
- Dialing code: 0346
- Website: Official website

Valgoglio (Bergamasque: Álgoi) is a comune (municipality) in the Province of Bergamo in the Italian region of Lombardy, located about 80 kilometres (50 mi) northeast of Milan and about 35 kilometres (22 mi) northeast of Bergamo.

Valgoglio borders the following municipalities: Ardesio, Branzi, Carona, Gandellino, Gromo.

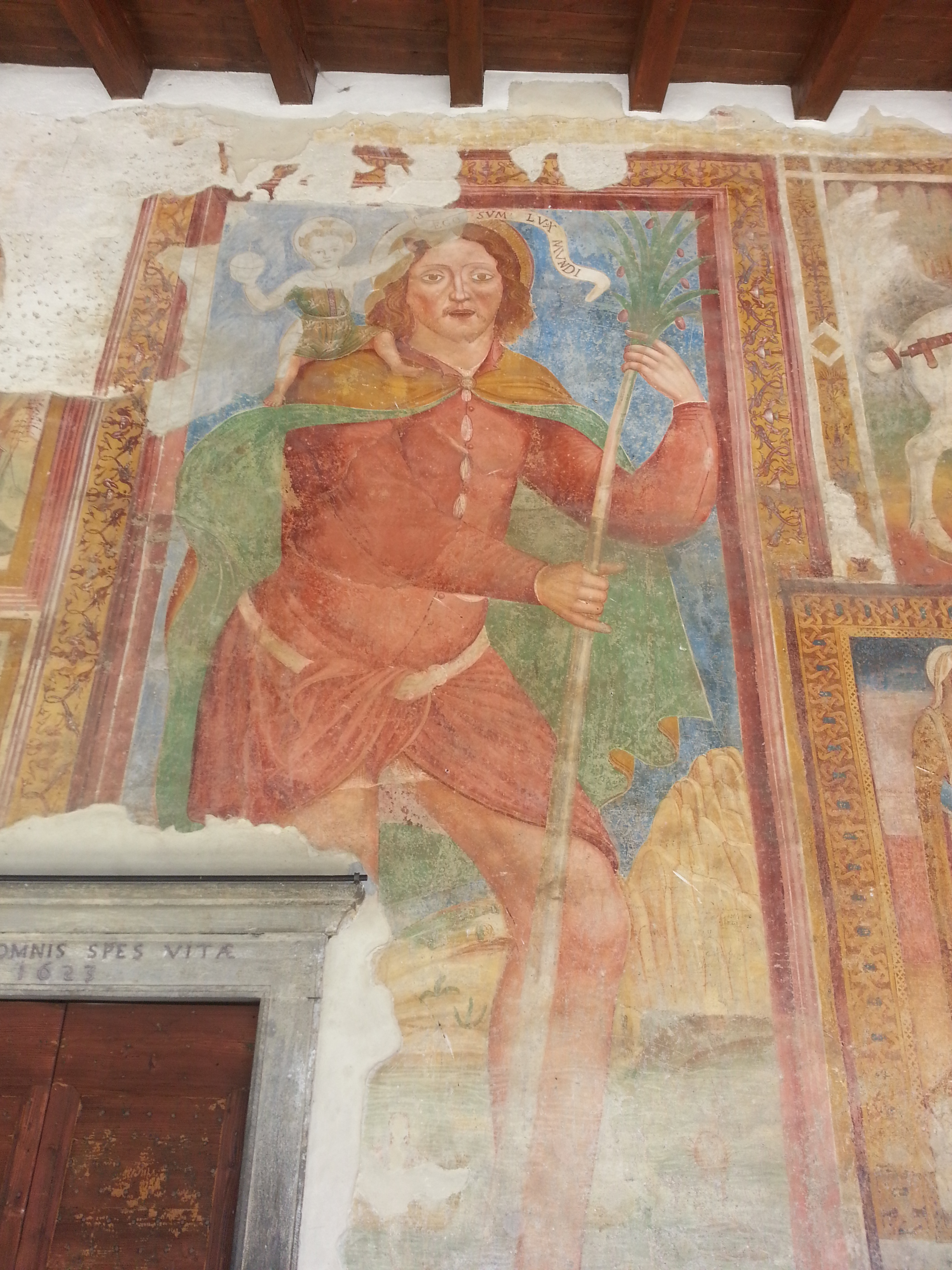
Fresco of San Cristoforo Church
