= Teglio =

- Comune
- Comune di Teglio
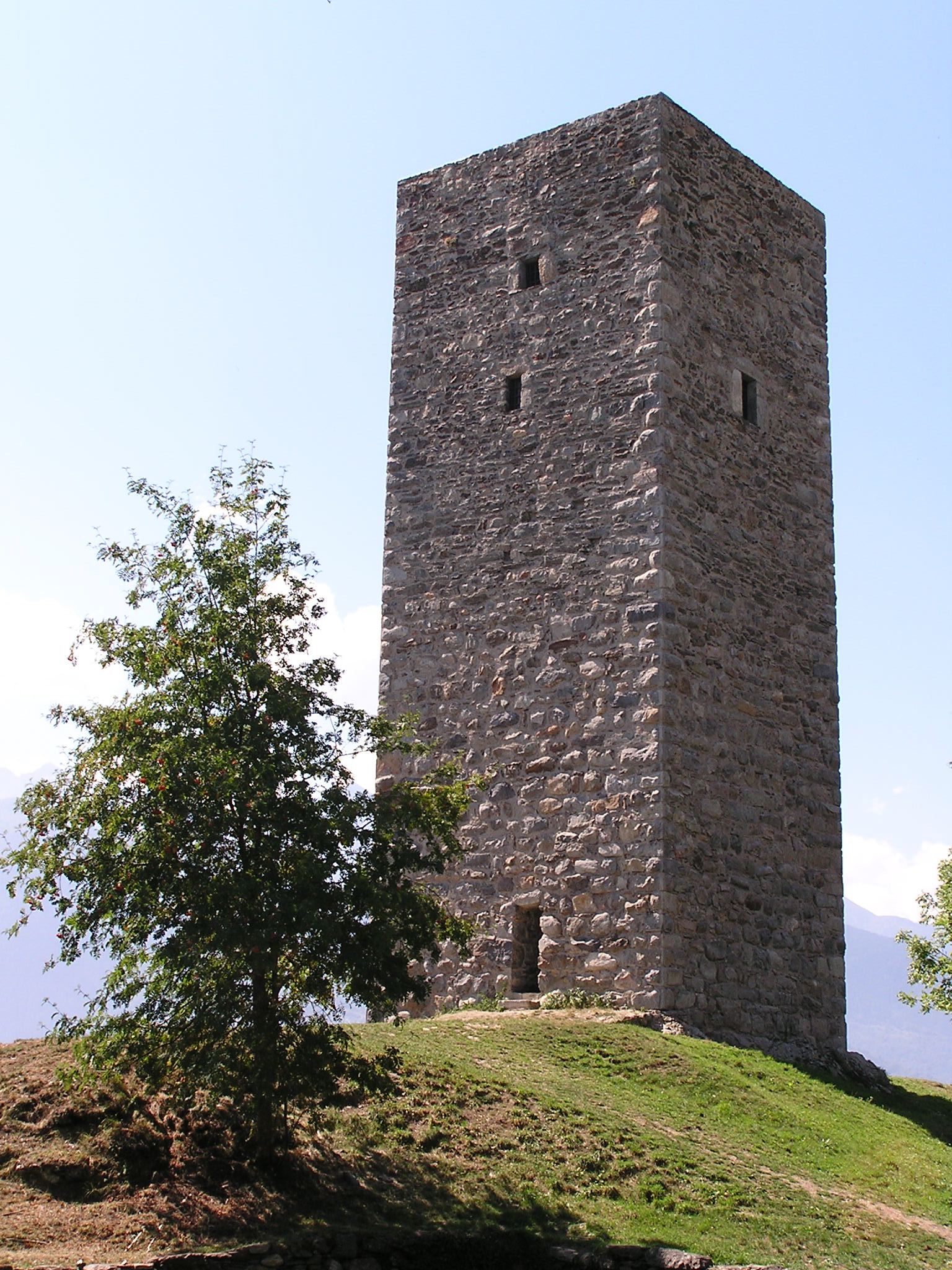
- The medieval Torre de li beli miri, symbol of the town.

- Coat of arms

- Location within Italy Location within Lombardy
- Coordinates: 46°10′N 10°4′E
- Country: Italy
- Region: Lombardy
- Province: Sondrio (SO)
- Frazioni: Tresenda

Government
  - Mayor: Piergiorgio Grolli

Area
  - Total: 115.3 km^{2} (44.5 sq mi)

Population (Dec. 2004)
  - Total: 4,737
  - Density: 41.08/km^{2} (106.4/sq mi)
- Demonym: Tellini
- Time zone: UTC+1 (CET)
  - Summer (DST): UTC+2 (CEST)
- Postal code: 23036
- Dialing code: 0342

Teglio (Téi in Valtellinese dialect) is a comune (municipality) in the Province of Sondrio in the Italian region Lombardy, located about 130 kilometres (81 mi) northeast of Milan and about 20 kilometres (12 mi) east of Sondrio, on the border with Switzerland.

The main attraction is the Palazzo Besta, one of the main Renaissance residences in Lombardy. Past notable residents include astronomer Michele Rajna.

Two pizzoccheri fairs (or sagre) take place in Teglio: La Sagra dei Pizzoccheri, celebrated annually in July, and the festival of The Golden Pizzocchero, celebrated annually in September.
