= Torre di Roncisvalle =

Tower in Italy

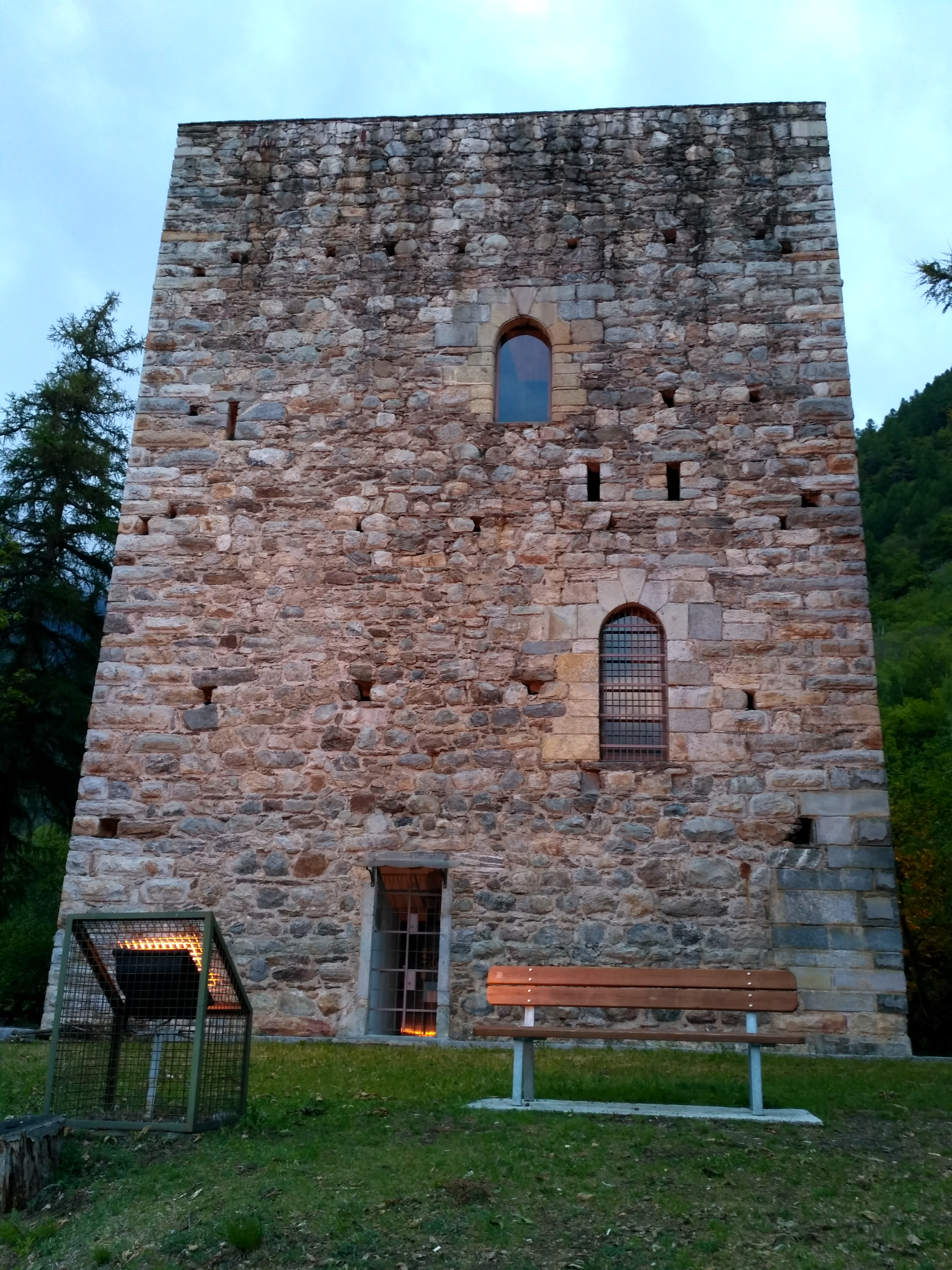
- View from the entrance to the tower of Roncisvalle of Castionetto di Chiuro

- Location of the Torre di Roncisvalle
- 46°10′53.56″N 10°0′0.17″E
- Location: Chiuro; Lombardy; Northern Italy

Site notes
- Height: 15 metres (49 ft)
- Owner: Municipal ownership

Torre di Roncisvalle is a tower overlooking Valtellina at an altitude of 689 metres, located in the Castionetto district of Chiuro, in the province of Sondrio, northern Italy. The massive tower offers an effective lookout point even today.

== Early history ==
The building is said to have belonged to Stefano Quadrio and is known as the Castionetto or Roncisvalle tower, the latter evoking the legendary route of Roncesvalles in Navarre, Spain.

The tower is mentioned in notarial deeds in the Middle Ages, one such document, drawn up in 1460, states a sale by Maria Maffina to Andrea Maffina, and the property comprised: a vineyard, fields, woodlands, shed, threshing barn, stable with hayloft, indoor kitchen with hearth, two courtyards, and right of way, located in the Castionetto district "ubi dictor ad dossum majorem seu ad Ronzivallem". ["known as Dosso Maggiore, and near to Roncisvalle"].

The Italian philologist, semiotician and literary critic Cesare Segre attributes the name Roncisvalle to "roscida valle", meaning a damp valley, and to "roscidare", meaning to irrigate, but also to "ronco", "runchet" from "runcare", to till a ground for planting new vines.

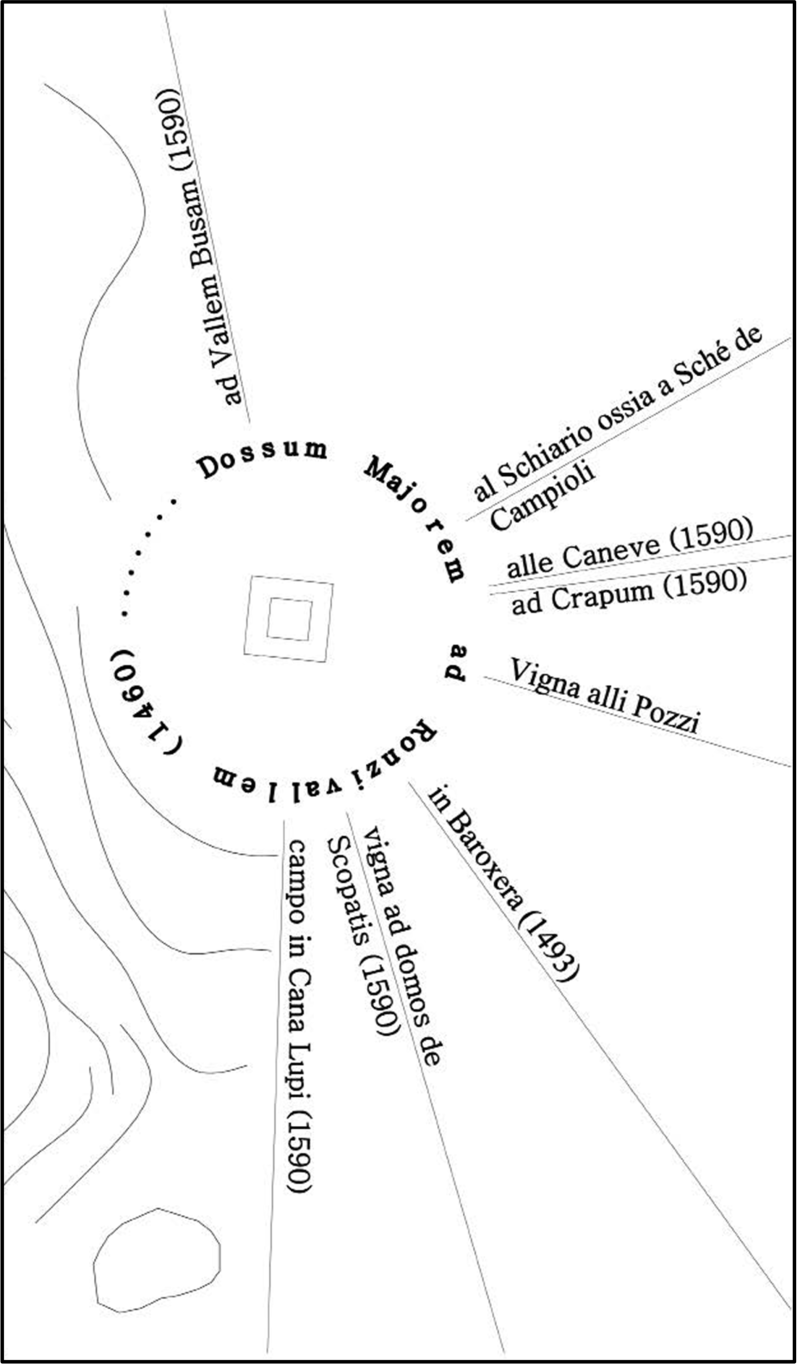
The stylized map shows the historical names of the paths that departed from the tower

The square-plan tower is eleven metres in length and width, and fifteen metres high, and far more imposing than those surviving at Teglio, Castello dell'Acqua, the two towers that are part of the respective Grumello castles, the Mancapane tower above Montagna, the two Castel Masegra towers, the Santa Maria di Tirano castle tower, and the Bellaguarda castle tower at Tovo di Sant'Agata. Given the sturdiness of the structure, with walls as thick as two and a half metres at the base, the tower must certainly have played a defensive as well as an observation role. Indeed, in 1487, defended by Zenone Groppello, the tower served as a precious bulwark against the invasion attempted by Grisons. The tower was restored in more recent times, after centuries of neglect, and reopened to the public in May 2003.

== Tower Design ==
The design aspects of the tower are significant, imitating forms of construction inspired by Lombard architectural traditions, highlighted by the materials used and by the quality of the details, like the ogival windows outlined with close-set ashlars. The façades have a uniform appearance thanks to the building method of standardized measures and materials, clearly seen in the stone courses and the cornerstones with characteristic bosses. The opening on the first floor was originally the entrance, accessed by a drawbridge operated from a niche above it. Today's entrance corresponds to an earlier opening. The ground floor and the first floor are barrel vaulted and a stone staircase leads up to the second floor.

No known documents establish the tower's construction period, although scholars agree that it can be dated thirteenth–fifteenth century, the period of greatest prosperity for the Quadrio family, settled down at Chiuro at the time.

The Quadrios were originally from Como, and left the city in the twelfth century, because of the Guelph–Ghibelline feuds. From the end of the 1300s to the first half of the 1400s, the military captain Stefano Quadrio led the village of Chiuro into a thriving economic and political period. Stefano owned a castle in Sazzo, a district of Ponte in Valtellina, but in what is now Via Torre there are the remains of his fortified mansion, built "ad Visnatem" [the Vicinate quarter, later Canterana or Cantarana – a compound of "cantare" and "rana" referring to the frogs that chirped in the canals whose water supplied blacksmiths]. Chiuro was dotted with towers whose lower sections are visible in later buildings erected on them.

In his Castelli e Torri Valtellinesi [Castles and Towers of Valtellina], Egidio Pedrotti writes that Zenone Gropello – a Sforza family military commander – used the tower and the Chiuro fortifications as a base, following the first Grisons attack of Valtellina, in 1486–7.

It is likely that during Grisons rule, the Castionetto tower suffered the same fate as the fortifications in the province of Sondrio since the invaders reinforced their control by neutralizing the military features of occupied territories.

n a document dated 1622, kept in the Chiuro archives, the tower is listed as the property of the religious order "Scuola del Rosario", which owned the building and surrounding land until the early 1800s, when it became the property of the "Scuola del SS. Sacramento".

By the first half of the nineteenth century, the Lombardy–Veneto land registers listed the lands as the property of the municipality of Chiuro. In 1885, the Lavizzari title deed states that the land and the tower had been expropriated and had become municipal property

== Modern Period ==
Subsequently the tower fell into neglect although it lost none of its monumental character. Restoration work carried out in the early 2000s, funded under Law No 102/90 (better known as the Valtellina Act), restored the tower to public use and ensured its preservation as a monument.

== Gallery ==
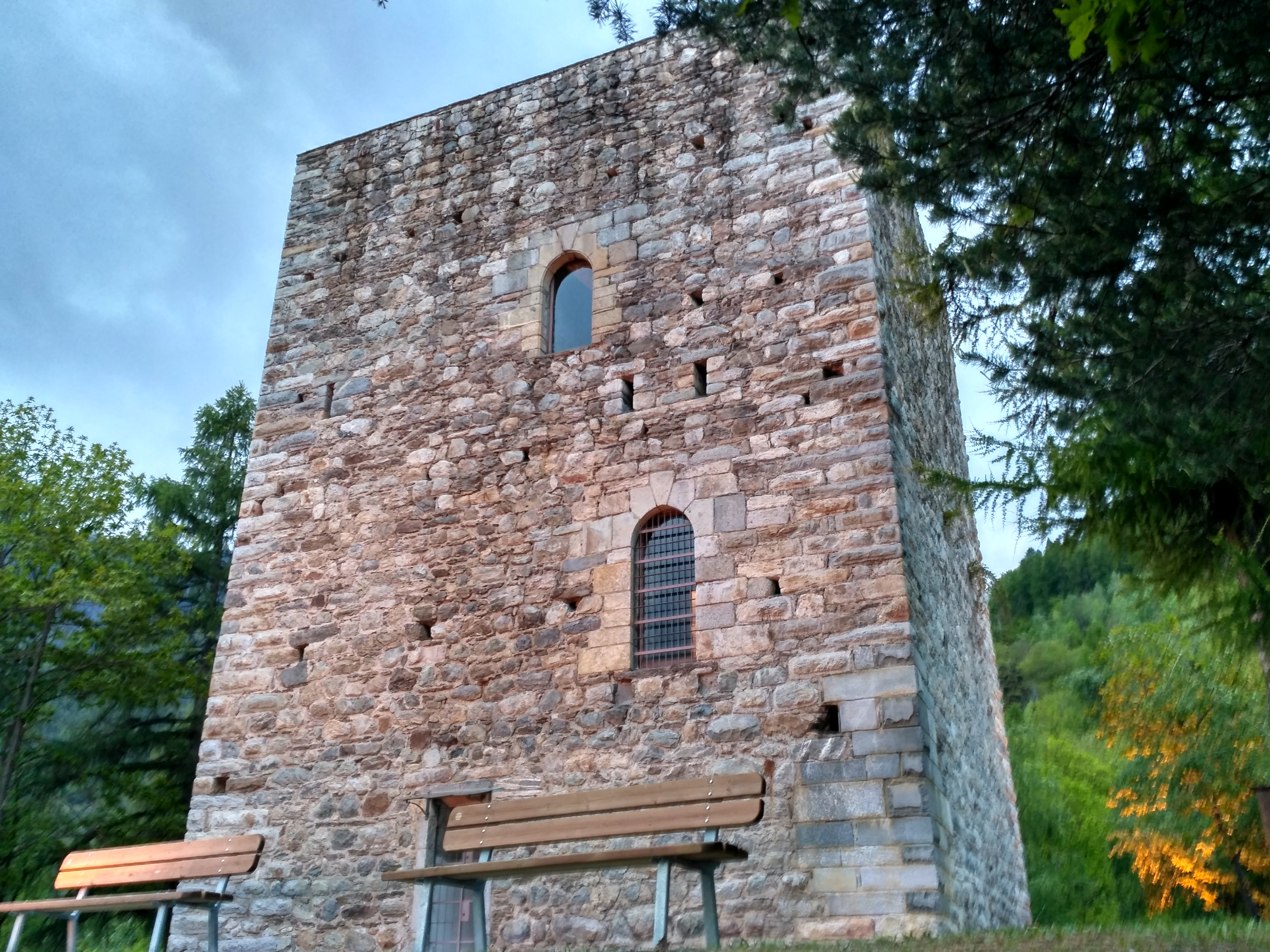
Tower of roncesvalles in Castionetto di Chiuro Sondrio Italy

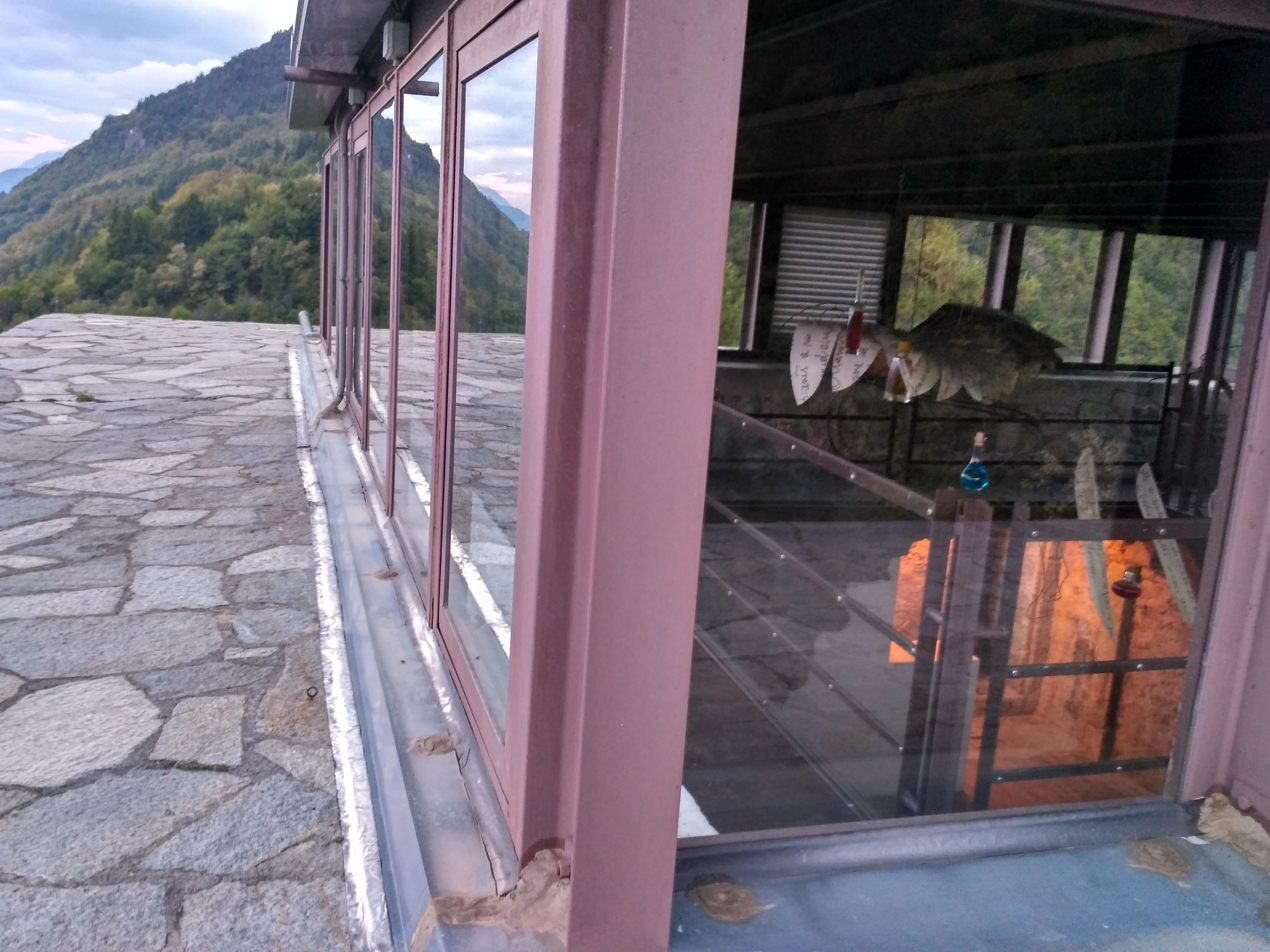
View of the guard of the Roncesvalles Tower of Castionetto of Chiuro

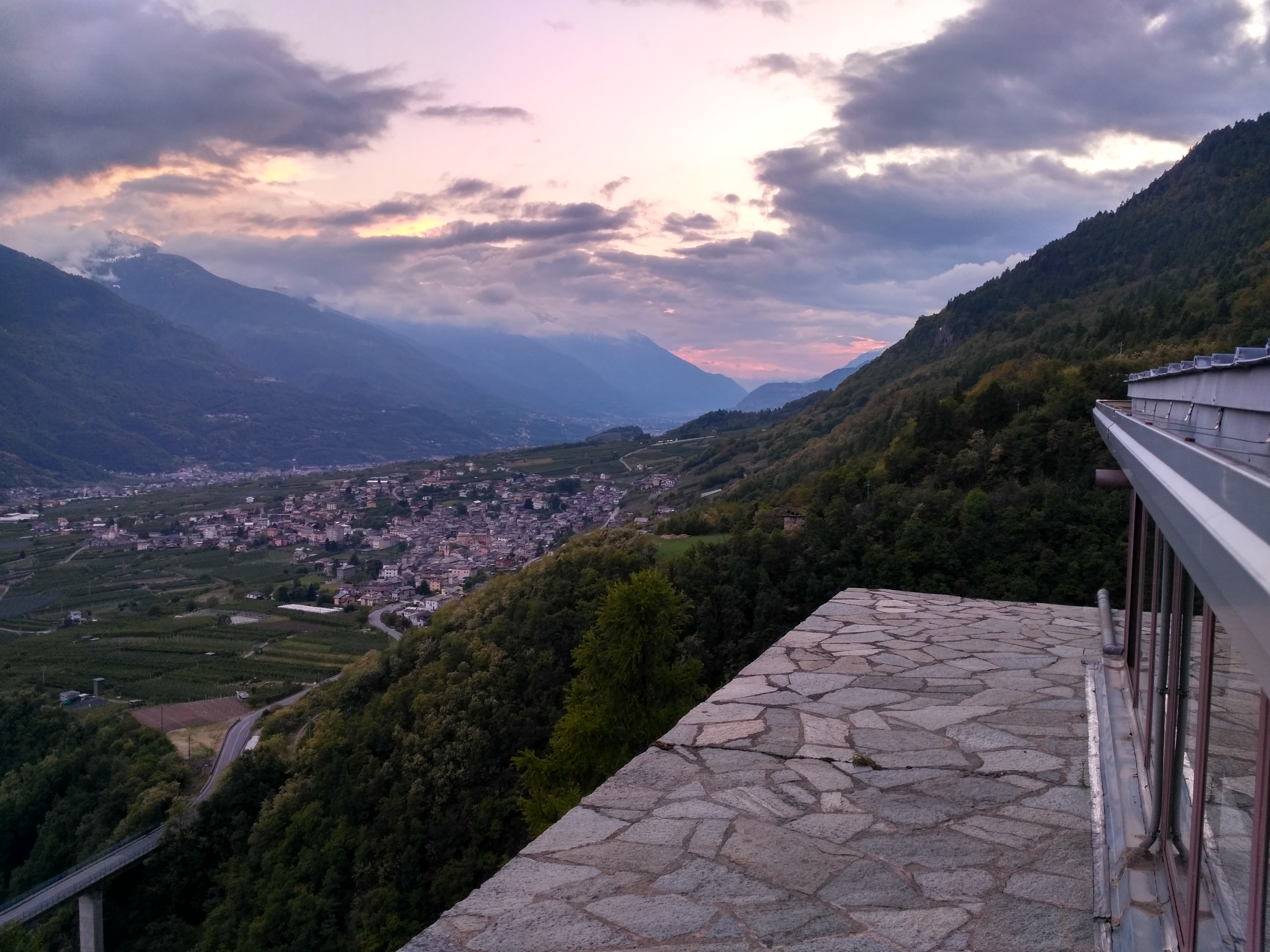
View from the top towards Sondrio of the Roncesvalles Tower of Castionetto of Chiuro

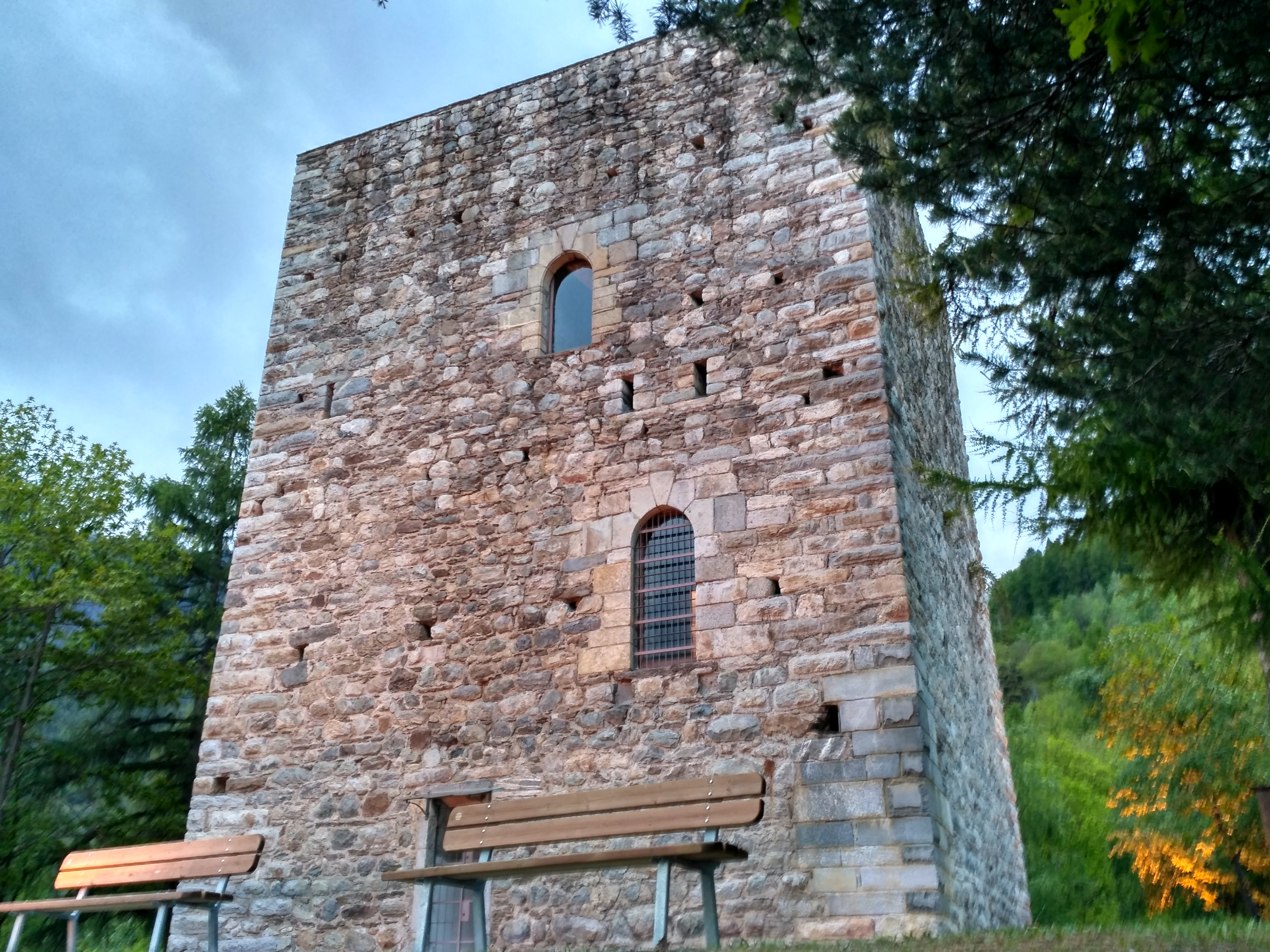
Top of the Roncesvalles Tower

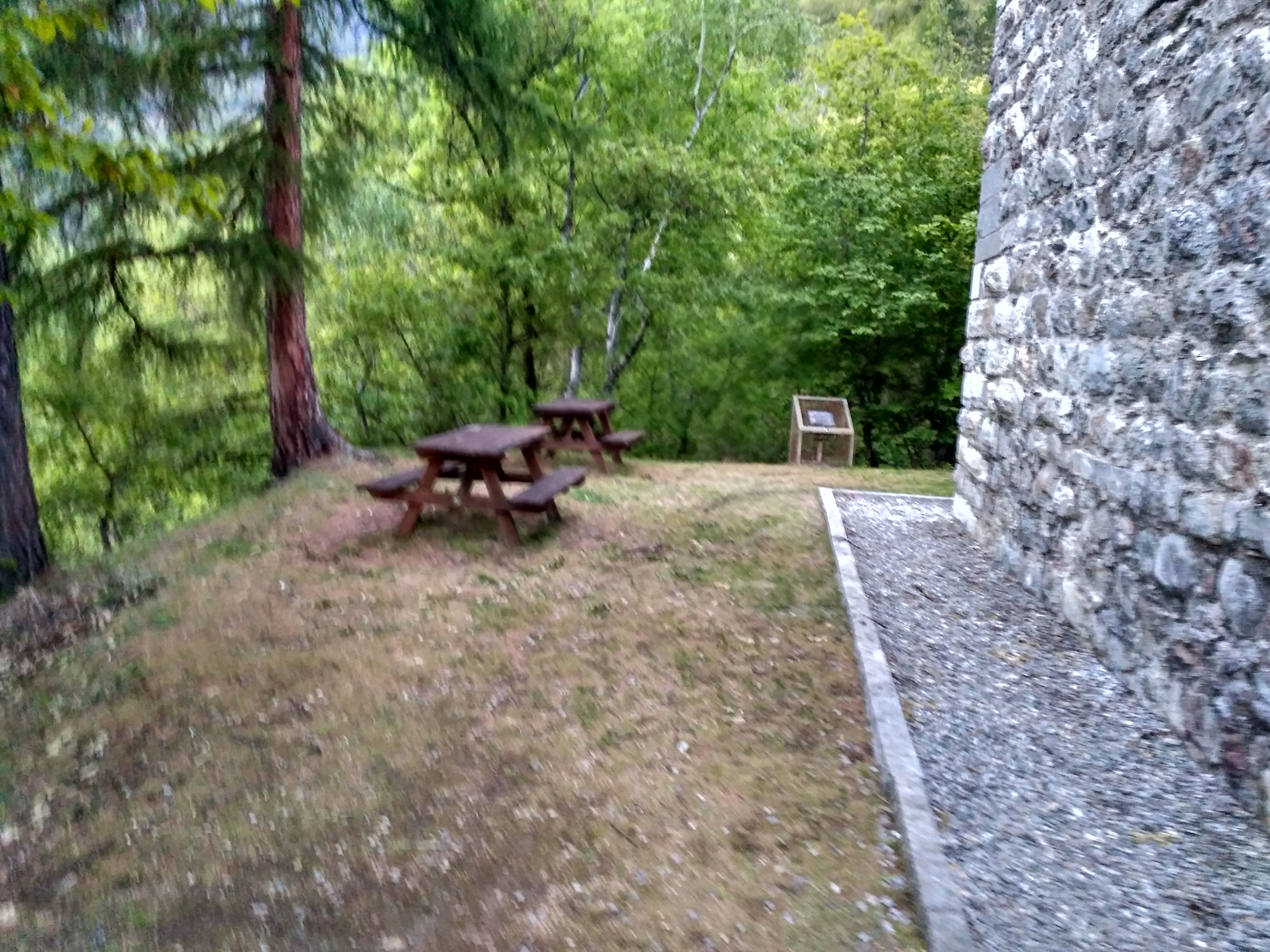
View from the side towards Ponte in Valtellina with picnic corner of the Roncesvalles Tower of Castionetto of Chiuro

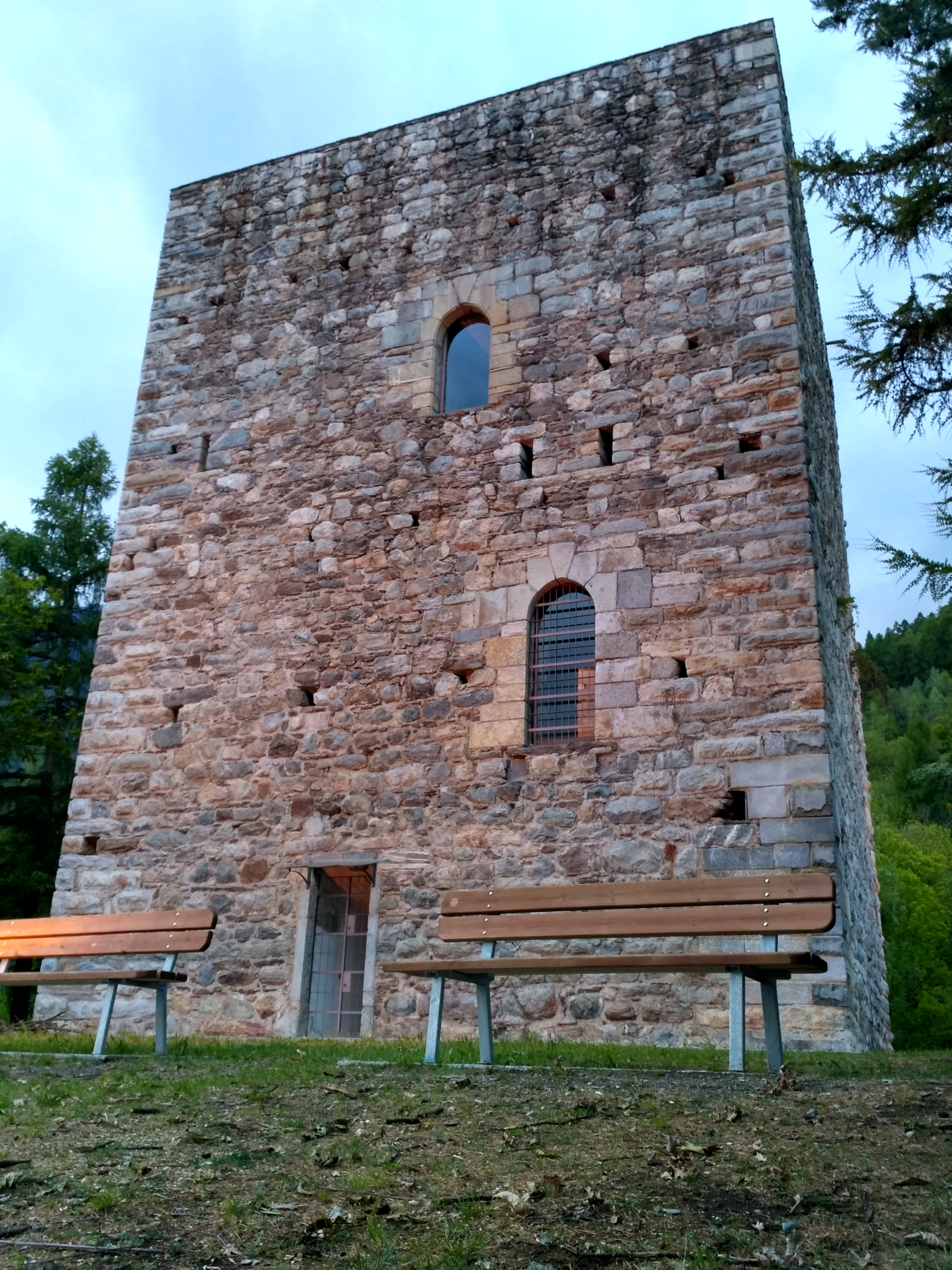
View from the entrance side of the Roncesvalles Tower of Castionetto of Chiuro

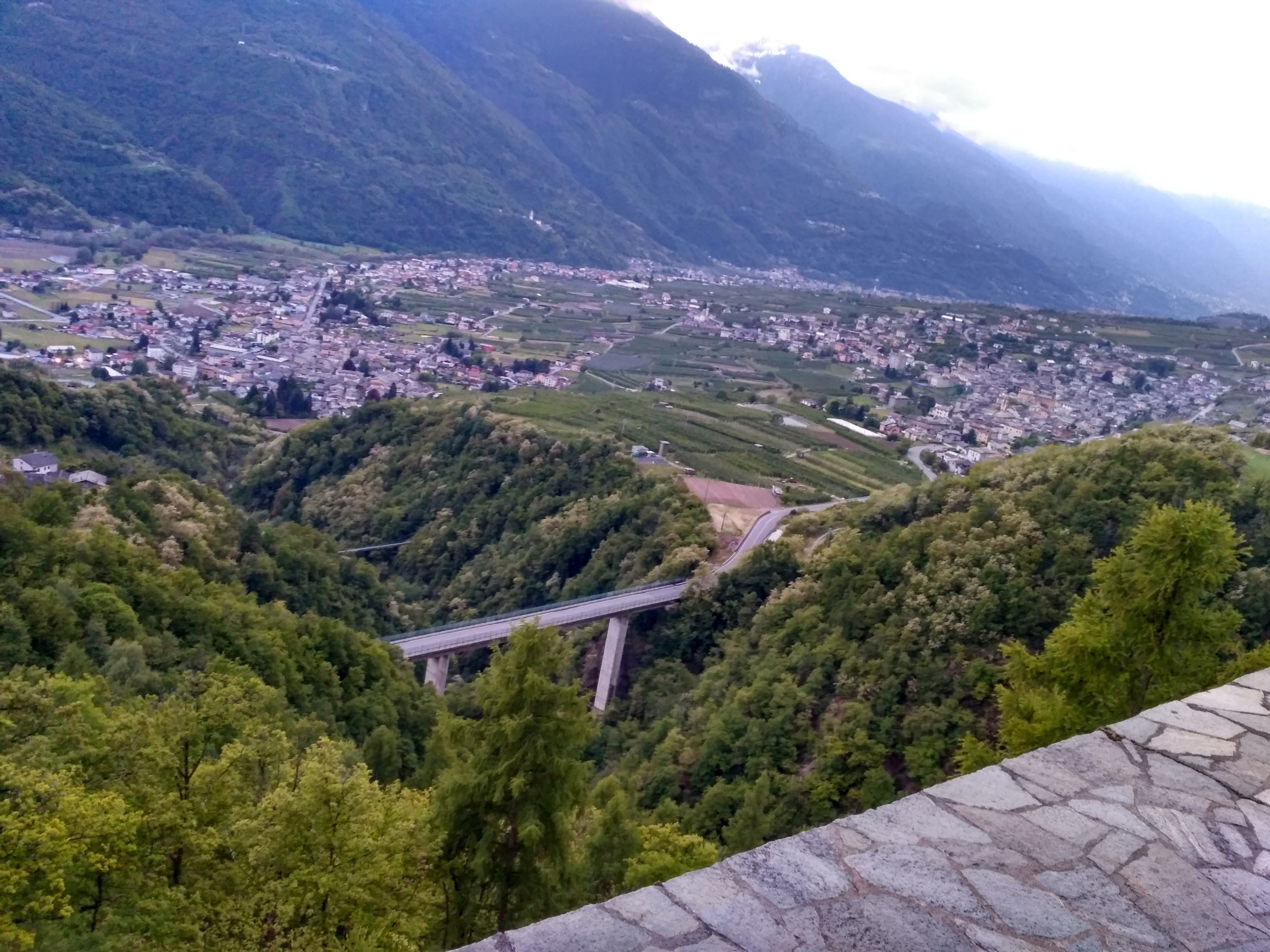
View from the summit towards Chiuro of the Roncesvalles Tower of Castionetto of Chiuro

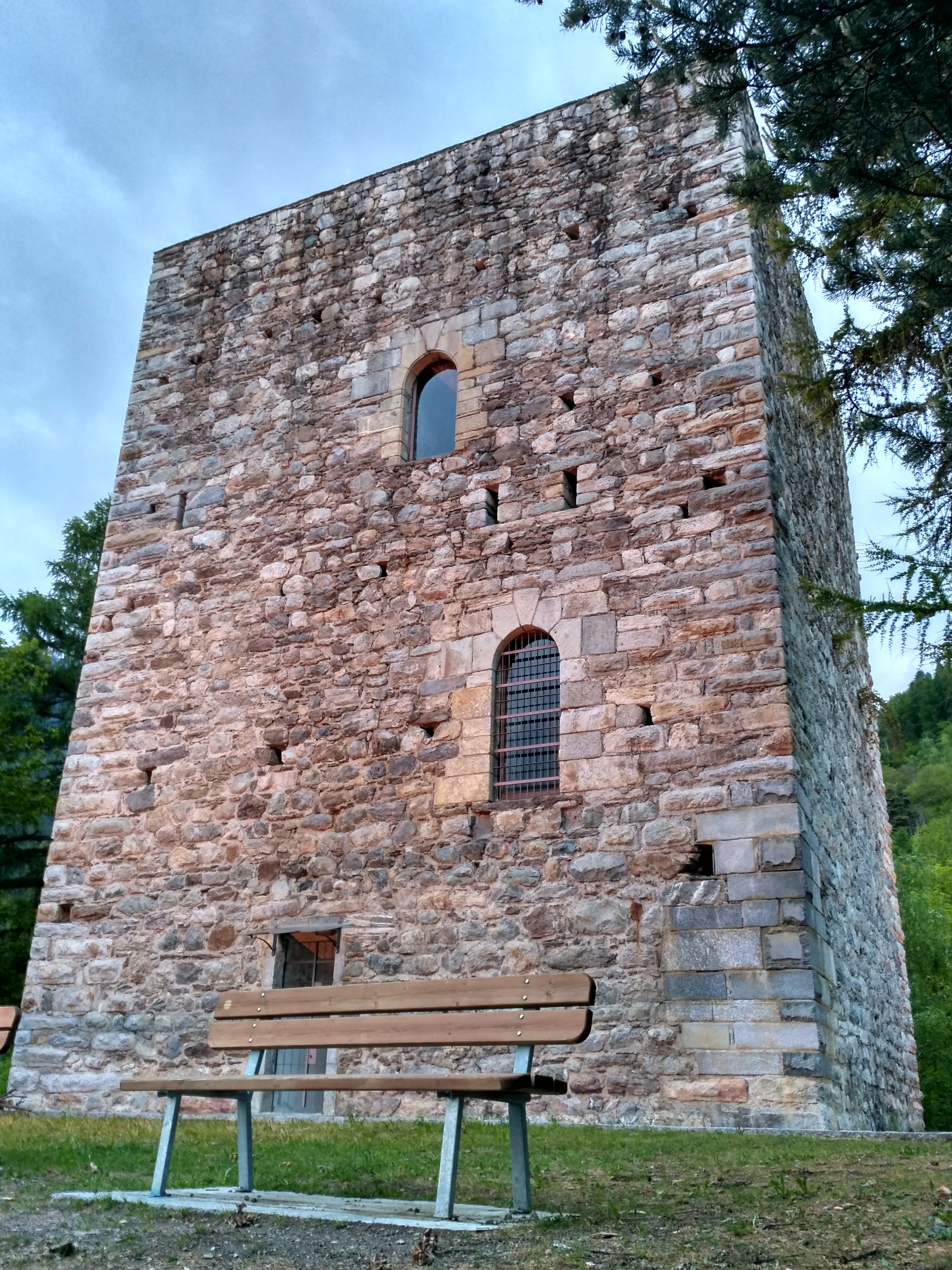
View from the entrance side of the Roncesvalles Tower of Castionetto of Chiuro

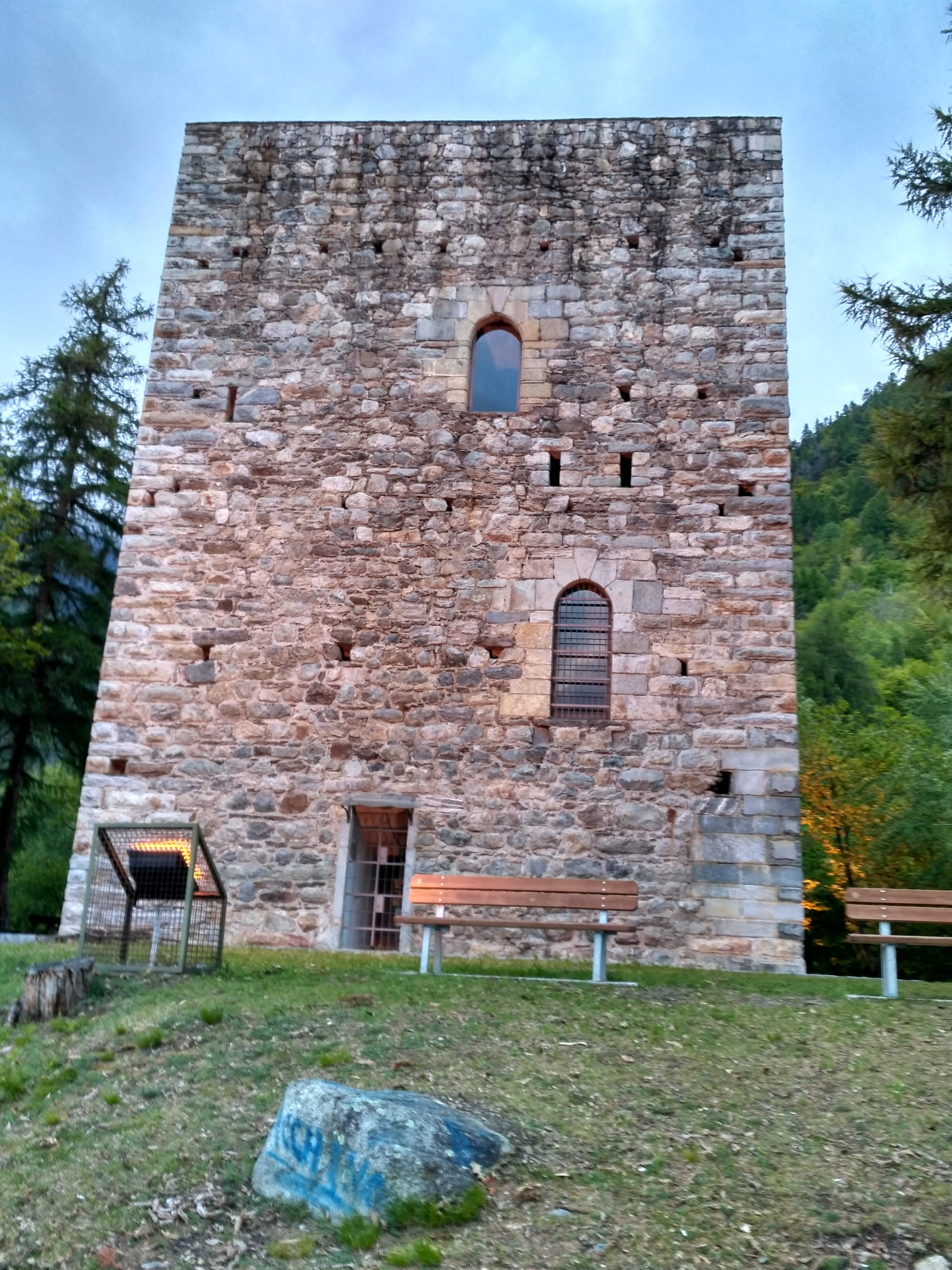
View from the side entrance of the Roncesvalles Tower of Castionetto of Chiuro

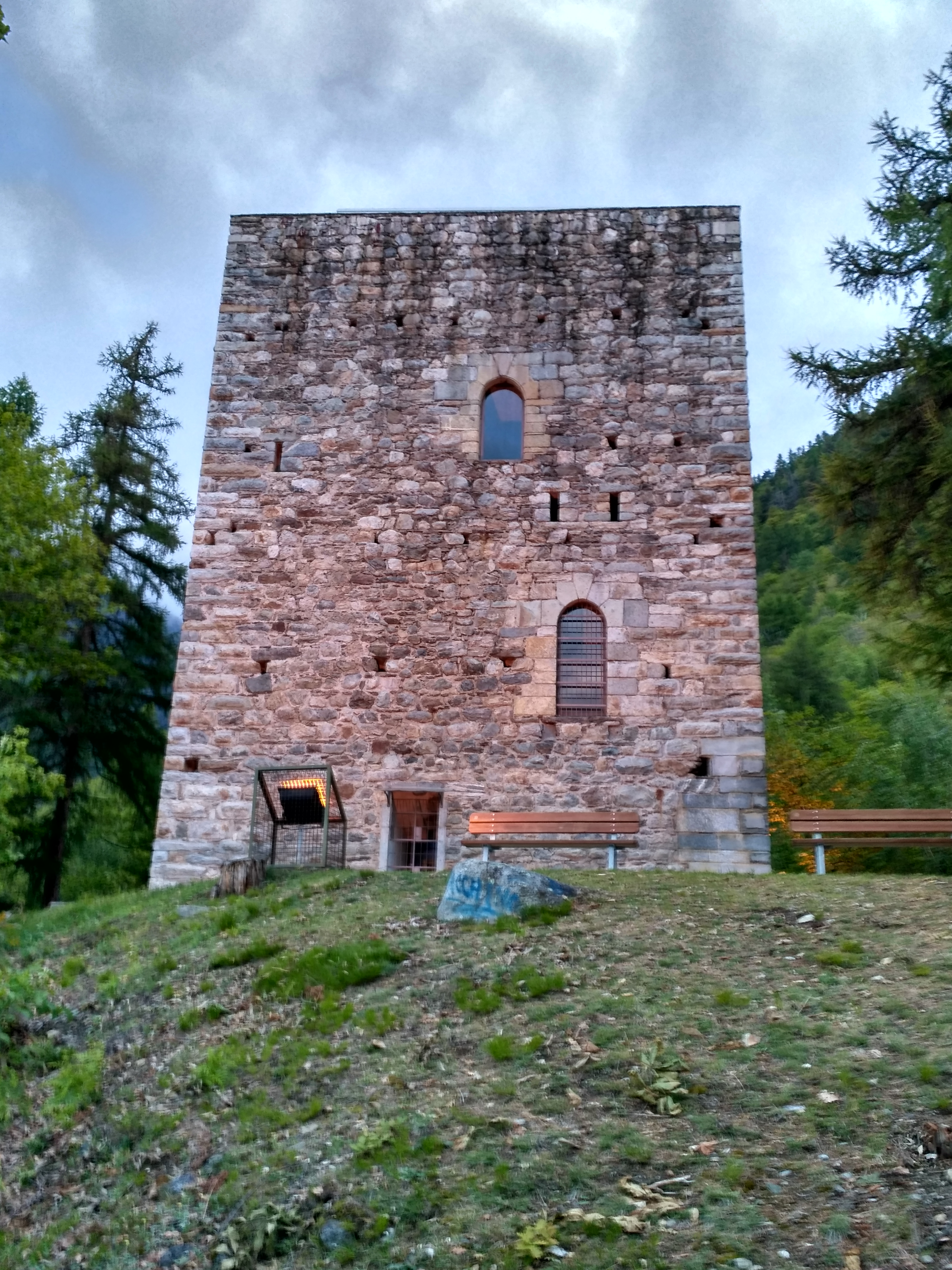
Another front view of the Roncesvalles Tower of Castionetto of Chiuro
