= Postalesio =

Postalesio Pustalés (Lombard)
- Comune
- Comune di Postalesio
- Location within Italy Location within Lombardy
- Coordinates: 46°10′N 9°47′E
- Country: Italy
- Region: Lombardy
- Province: Province of Sondrio (SO)

Area
  - Total: 10.6 km^{2} (4.1 sq mi)

Population (Dec. 2004)
  - Total: 618
  - Density: 58.3/km^{2} (151/sq mi)
- Time zone: UTC+1 (CET)
  - Summer (DST): UTC+2 (CEST)
- Postal code: 23010
- Dialing code: 0342
- Website: Official website

Postalesio (Lombard: Pustalés) is a comune (municipality) in the Province of Sondrio in the Italian region of Lombardy, located about 90 kilometres (56 mi) northeast of Milan and about 6 kilometres (4 mi) west of Sondrio. As of 31 December 2004, it had a population of 618 and an area of 10.6 square kilometres (4.1 mi^{2}).

Postalesio borders the following municipalities: Berbenno di Valtellina, Caiolo, Castione Andevenno, Cedrasco, Fusine, Torre di Santa Maria.

== Demographic evolution ==
Historical population

Year	Pop.	±%
1861	642	—
1871	681	+6.1%
1881	702	+3.1%
1901	826	+17.7%
1911	801	−3.0%

Year	Pop.	±%
1921	737	−8.0%
1931	613	−16.8%
1936	620	+1.1%
1951	585	−5.6%
1961	550	−6.0%

Year	Pop.	±%
1971	571	+3.8%
1981	579	+1.4%
1991	576	−0.5%
2001	609	+5.7%

Source: Data from ISTAT
