= Santi Gervasio e Protasio, Sondrio =

Church in Sondrio

Santi Gervasio e Protasio is a Roman Catholic collegiate church located in the town of Sondrio in the province of the same name, region of Lombardy, Italy.

== History ==
A church is documented since the 12th century, and still retains a facade facing west. The interior has a single nave with a peaked wooden roof. The church houses paintings depicting a Miracle of St Gregory the Great, a Virgin of the Rosary, and an Adoration of the Holy Sacrament by Saints Gervasio and Protasio by Pietro Ligari. Other works in the church include a Glory of St Joseph by Giuseppe Antonio Petrini and paintings depicting the Martyrdom of Sts Gervasio and Protasio and the Transport of their relics by Giacomo Parravicini, also called il Gianolo. There is a Baptism of Christ by Antonio Caimi, who also painted the tomb portrait of the blessed martyr and priest Nicolò Rusca. The church also housed frescoes by Giovanni Gavazzeni of Talamona and Giovanni Pietro Romegialli of Morbegno.

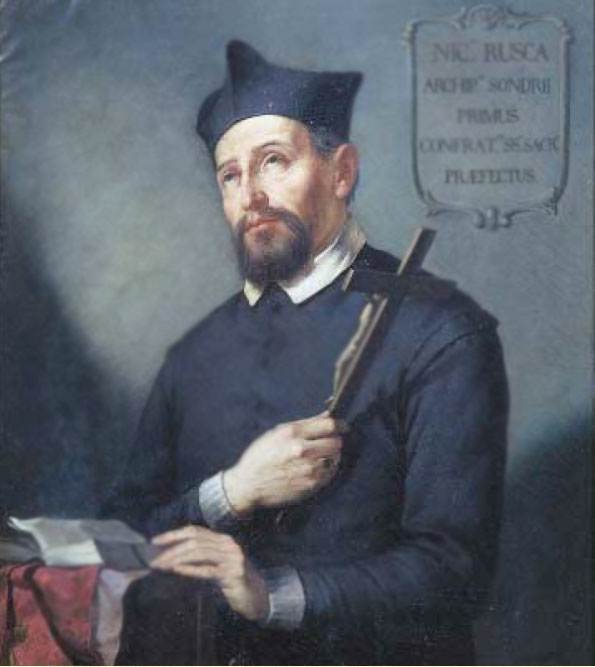
Portrait of Rusca by Caimi.

The bell-tower, left incomplete, was erected in 1763 by a Pietro Solari.
