= San Fedele =

San Fedele may refer to:

== Churches ==
- San Fedele, Milan, a church in Milan, Lombardy, Italy
- San Fedele, Poggiridenti, a church in Poggiridenti, Lombardy, Italy
- Basilica of San Fedele, Como, a basilica church in Como, Lombardy, Italy

== People ==
- Fidelis of Como, saint

== Places ==
- San Fedele, Albenga, a village in the province of Savona, Liguria, Italy
- San Fedele, Radda in Chianti, a village in the province of Siena, Tuscany, Italy
- San Fedele Intelvi, a village in the province of Como, Lombardy, Italy
