= Poggiridenti =

- Comune
- Comune di Poggiridenti
- Location within Italy Location within Lombardy
- Coordinates: 46°10′N 9°55′E
- Country: Italy
- Region: Lombardy
- Province: Province of Sondrio (SO)

Area
  - Total: 2.9 km^{2} (1.1 sq mi)
- Elevation: 564 m (1,850 ft)

Population (Dec. 2013)
  - Total: 1,895
  - Density: 650/km^{2} (1,700/sq mi)
- Time zone: UTC+1 (CET)
  - Summer (DST): UTC+2 (CEST)
- Postal code: 23020
- Dialing code: 0342
- Website: Official website

Poggiridenti is a comune (municipality) in the Province of Sondrio in the Italian region Lombardy, located about 100 kilometres (62 mi) northeast of Milan and about 4 kilometres (2 mi) east of Sondrio. On 31 December 2013, it had a population of 1,895 and an area of 2.9 square kilometres (1.1 mi^{2}).

Poggiridenti borders the following municipalities: Montagna in Valtellina, Piateda, Tresivio.

The church of San Fedele has frescoes by Fermo Stella.

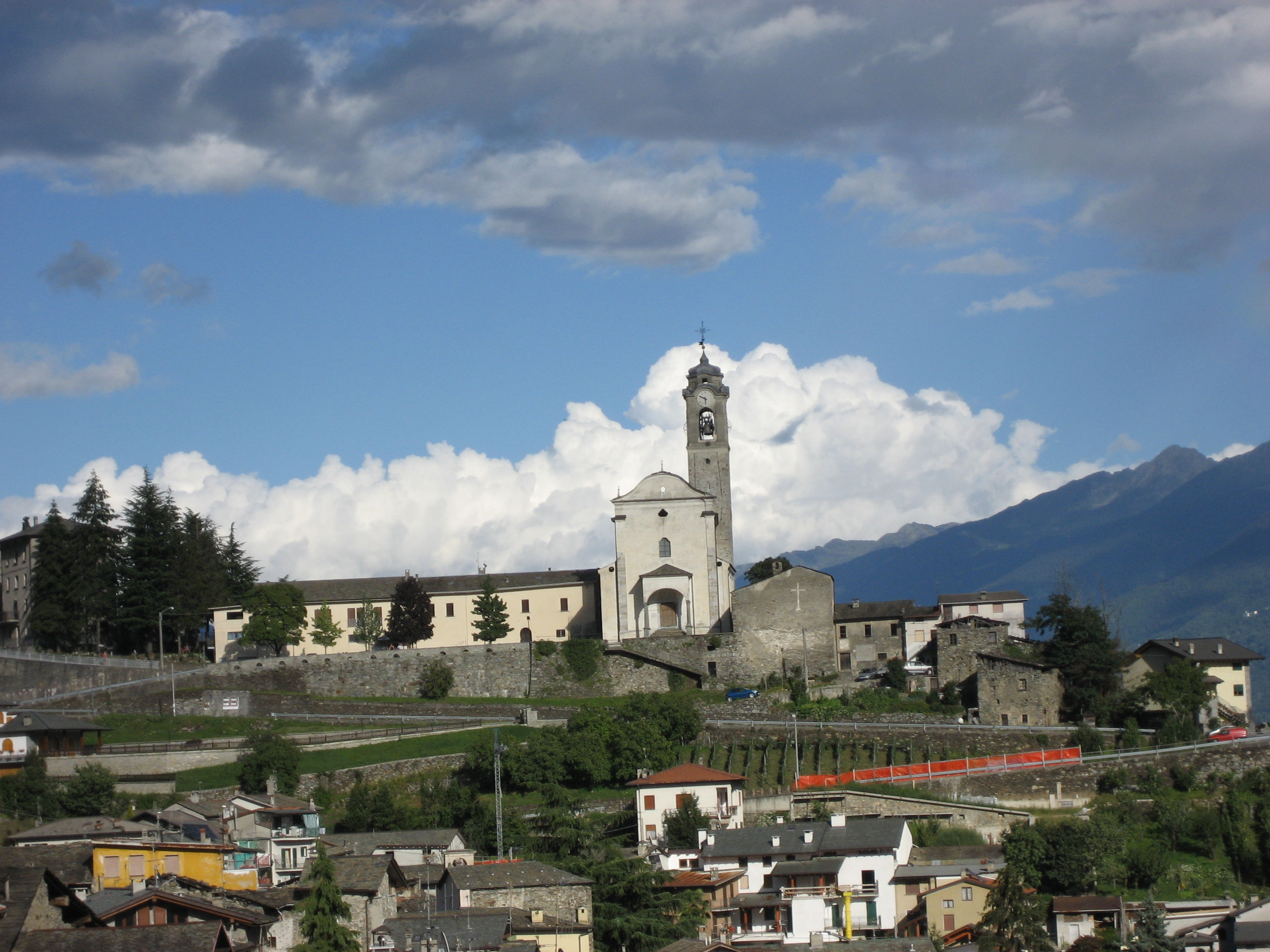
Poggiridenti with the view of the Parish Church

== Demographic evolution ==
Historical population

Year	Pop.	±%
1861	619	—
1871	722	+16.6%
1881	800	+10.8%
1901	878	+9.7%
1911	982	+11.8%

Year	Pop.	±%
1921	1,084	+10.4%
1931	1,018	−6.1%
1936	1,019	+0.1%
1951	1,157	+13.5%
1961	1,236	+6.8%

Year	Pop.	±%
1971	1,289	+4.3%
1981	1,559	+20.9%
1991	1,649	+5.8%
2001	1,807	+9.6%

Source: Data from ISTAT
