= Castello dell'Acqua =

Castello dei dell'Acqua
- Comune
- Comune di Castello dell'Acqua
- Coat of arms

- Location within Italy Location within Lombardy
- Coordinates: 46°9′N 10°1′E
- Country: Italy
- Region: Lombardy
- Province: Province of Sondrio (SO)

Area
  - Total: 13.9 km^{2} (5.4 sq mi)

Population (Dec. 2004)
  - Total: 693
  - Density: 49.9/km^{2} (129/sq mi)
- Demonym: Marà
- Time zone: UTC+1 (CET)
  - Summer (DST): UTC+2 (CEST)
- Postal code: 23030
- Dialing code: 0342
- Website: Official website

Castello dell'Acqua is a comune (municipality) in the Province of Sondrio in the Italian region Lombardy, located about 100 kilometres (62 mi) northeast of Milan and about 12 kilometres (7 mi) east of Sondrio. As of 31 December 2004, it had a population of 693 and an area of 13.9 square kilometres (5.4 mi^{2}).

Castello dell'Acqua borders the following municipalities: Chiuro, Ponte in Valtellina, Teglio.

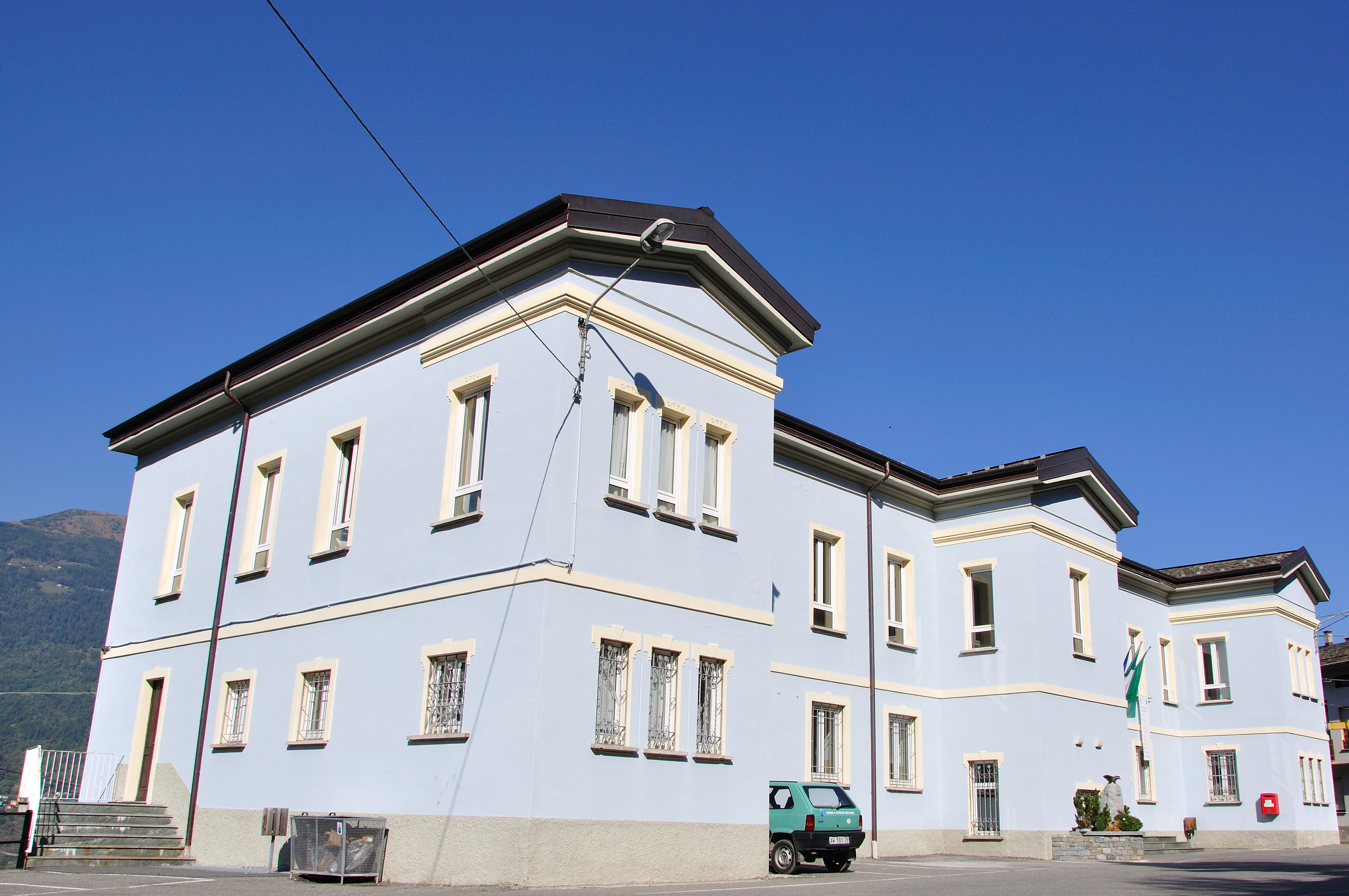
The town hall

== Demographic evolution ==
Historical population

Year	Pop.	±%
1861	1,031	—
1871	1,151	+11.6%
1881	1,190	+3.4%
1901	1,244	+4.5%
1911	1,335	+7.3%
1921	1,305	−2.2%

Year	Pop.	±%
1931	1,245	−4.6%
1936	1,237	−0.6%
1951	1,174	−5.1%
1961	1,041	−11.3%
1971	843	−19.0%
1981	776	−7.9%

Year	Pop.	±%
1991	740	−4.6%
2001	700	−5.4%
2011	643	−8.1%
2021	615	−4.4%

Source: Data from ISTAT
