= Cedrasco =

- Comune
- Comune di Cedrasco
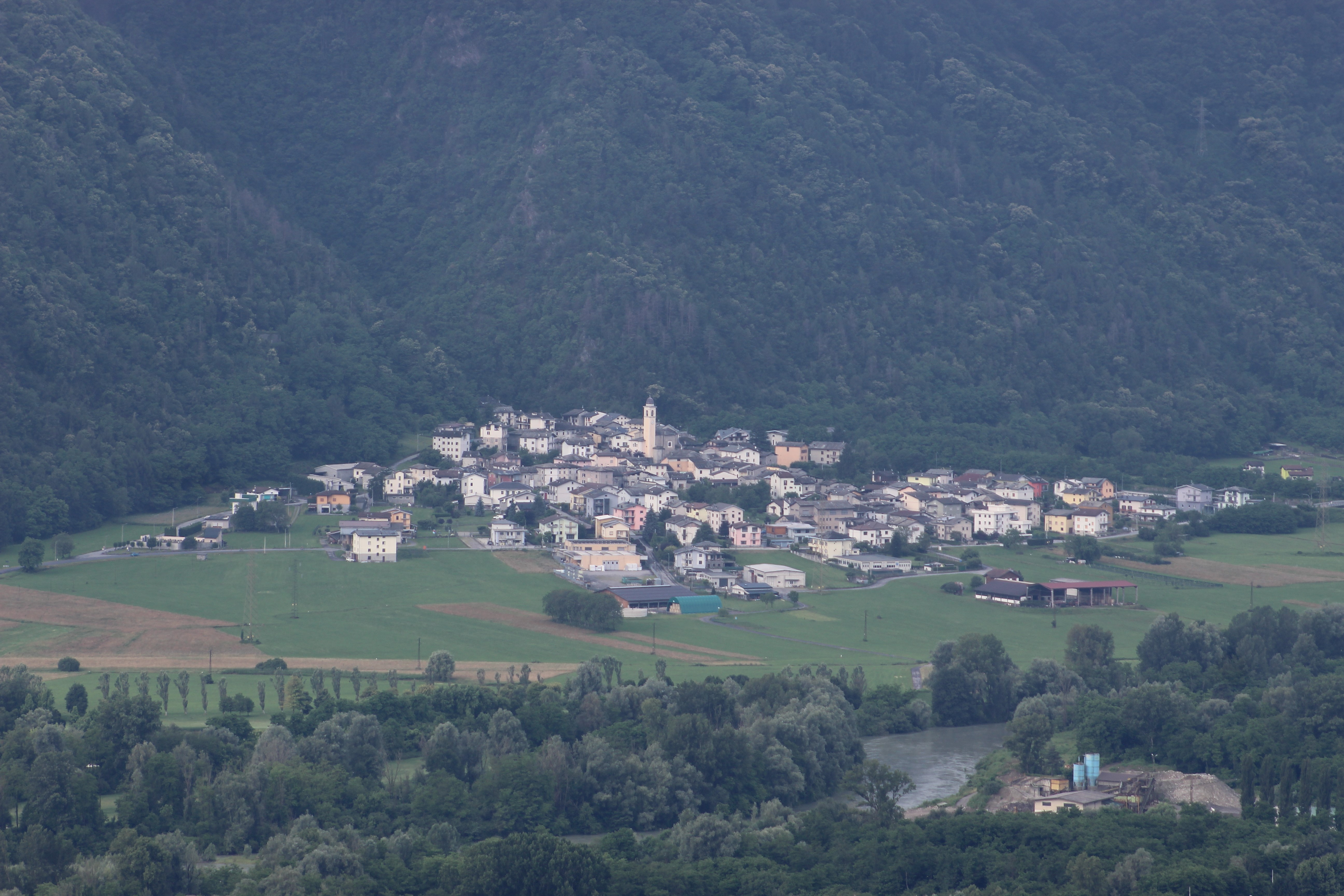

- Location within Italy Location within Lombardy
- Coordinates: 46°9′N 9°46′E
- Country: Italy
- Region: Lombardy
- Province: Province of Sondrio (SO)

Area
  - Total: 14.8 km^{2} (5.7 sq mi)

Population (Dec. 2004)
  - Total: 476
  - Density: 32.2/km^{2} (83.3/sq mi)
- Time zone: UTC+1 (CET)
  - Summer (DST): UTC+2 (CEST)
- Postal code: 23010
- Dialing code: 0342
- Website: Official website

Cedrasco is a comune (municipality) in the Province of Sondrio in the Italian region Lombardy, located about 90 kilometres (56 mi) northeast of Milan and about 8 kilometres (5 mi) west of Sondrio. As of 31 December 2004, it had a population of 476 and an area of 14.8 square kilometres (5.7 mi^{2}).

Cedrasco borders the following municipalities: Berbenno di Valtellina, Caiolo, Foppolo, Fusine, Postalesio.

== Demographic evolution ==
Historical population

Year	Pop.	±%
1861	268	—
1871	362	+35.1%
1881	415	+14.6%
1901	457	+10.1%
1911	438	−4.2%

Year	Pop.	±%
1921	447	+2.1%
1931	439	−1.8%
1936	428	−2.5%
1951	448	+4.7%
1961	455	+1.6%

Year	Pop.	±%
1971	474	+4.2%
1981	501	+5.7%
1991	497	−0.8%
2001	484	−2.6%

Source: Data from ISTAT
