= Berbenno di Valtellina =

Berbenno di Valtellina Berbenn (Lombard)
- Comune
- Comune di Berbenno di Valtellina
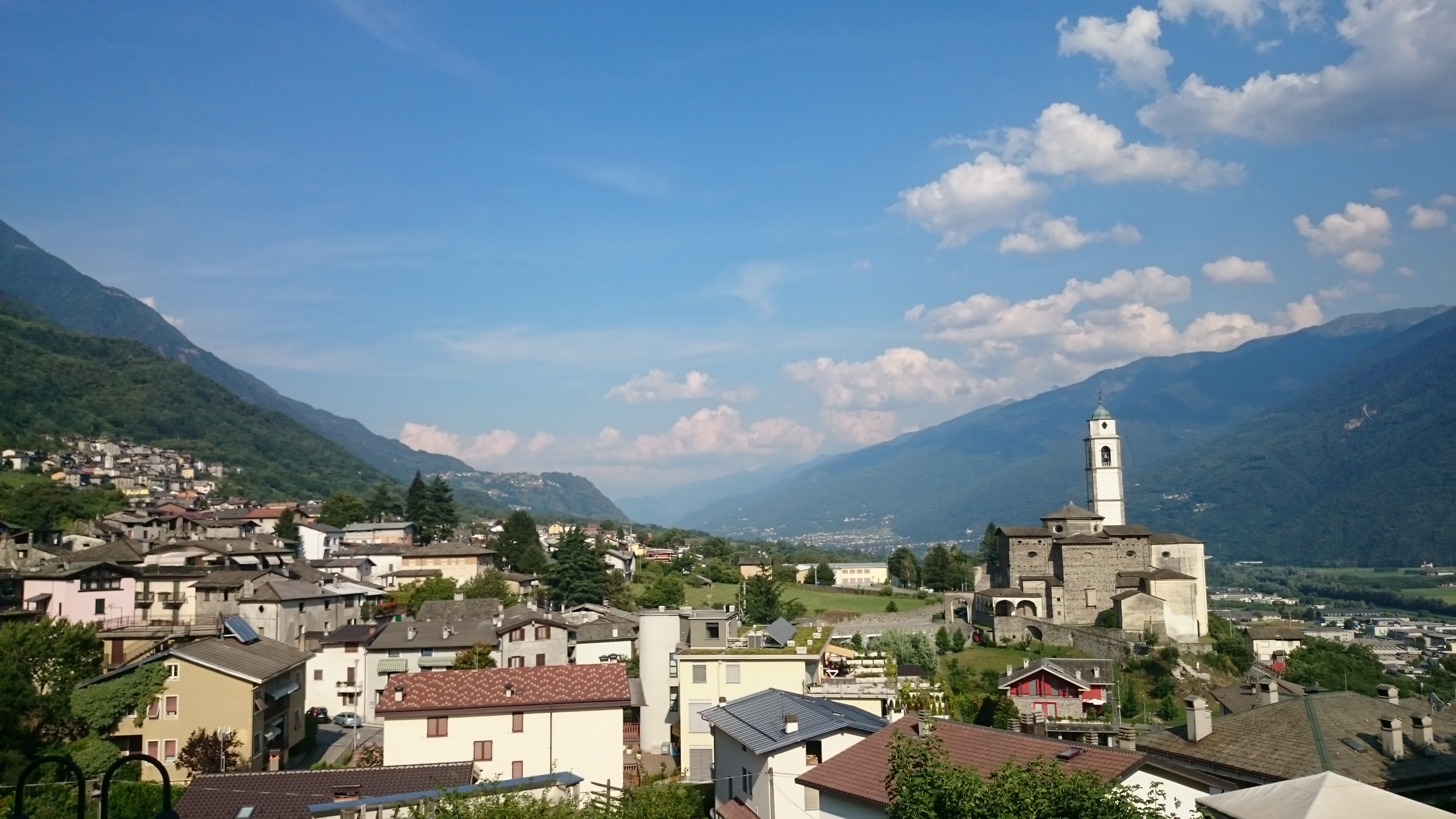
- View of Berbenno di Valtellina

- Coat of arms

- Location within Italy Location within Lombardy
- Coordinates: 46°10′N 9°45′E
- Country: Italy
- Region: Lombardy
- Province: Province of Sondrio (SO)

Area
  - Total: 35.7 km^{2} (13.8 sq mi)

Population (Dec. 2004)
  - Total: 4,226
  - Density: 118/km^{2} (307/sq mi)
- Time zone: UTC+1 (CET)
  - Summer (DST): UTC+2 (CEST)
- Postal code: 23010
- Dialing code: 0342
- Website: Official website

Berbenno di Valtellina (Lombard: Berbenn) is a comune (municipality) in the Province of Sondrio in the Italian region Lombardy, located about 90 kilometres (56 mi) northeast of Milan and about 9 kilometres (6 mi) west of Sondrio. As of 31 December 2004, it had a population of 4,226 and an area of 35.7 square kilometres (13.8 mi^{2}).

Berbenno di Valtellina borders the following municipalities: Buglio in Monte, Cedrasco, Colorina, Fusine, Postalesio, Torre di Santa Maria.

== Demographic evolution ==
Historical population

Year	Pop.	±%
1861	2,668	—
1871	3,045	+14.1%
1881	3,224	+5.9%
1901	3,304	+2.5%
1911	3,544	+7.3%

Year	Pop.	±%
1921	3,291	−7.1%
1931	3,156	−4.1%
1936	3,265	+3.5%
1951	3,411	+4.5%
1961	3,411	+0.0%

Year	Pop.	±%
1971	3,628	+6.4%
1981	4,033	+11.2%
1991	4,135	+2.5%
2001	4,177	+1.0%

Source: Data from ISTAT
