= Albosaggia =

- Comune
- Comune di Albosaggia
- Location within Italy Location within Lombardy
- Coordinates: 46°9′N 9°51′E
- Country: Italy
- Region: Lombardy
- Province: Province of Sondrio (SO)

Area
  - Total: 34.3 km^{2} (13.2 sq mi)
- Elevation: 490 m (1,610 ft)

Population (Dec. 2004)
  - Total: 3,135
  - Density: 91.4/km^{2} (237/sq mi)
- Time zone: UTC+1 (CET)
  - Summer (DST): UTC+2 (CEST)
- Postal code: 23100
- Dialing code: 0342
- Website: Official website

Albosaggia is a comune (municipality) in the Province of Sondrio in the Italian region Lombardy, located about 90 kilometres (56 mi) northeast of Milan and about 2 kilometres (1 mi) southwest of Sondrio. As of 31 December 2004, it had a population of 3,135 and an area of 34.3 square kilometres (13.2 mi^{2}).

Albosaggia borders the following municipalities: Caiolo, Castione Andevenno, Faedo Valtellino, Montagna in Valtellina, Piateda, Sondrio.

== Demographic evolution ==
Historical population

Year	Pop.	±%
1861	1,888	—
1871	2,023	+7.2%
1881	2,343	+15.8%
1901	2,623	+12.0%
1911	3,030	+15.5%

Year	Pop.	±%
1921	2,931	−3.3%
1931	2,824	−3.7%
1936	2,891	+2.4%
1951	3,043	+5.3%
1961	3,150	+3.5%

Year	Pop.	±%
1971	3,104	−1.5%
1981	3,123	+0.6%
1991	3,074	−1.6%
2001	3,084	+0.3%

Source: Data from ISTAT
