= Tresivio =

- Comune
- Comune di Tresivio
- Location within Italy Location within Lombardy
- Coordinates: 46°10′N 9°57′E
- Country: Italy
- Region: Lombardy
- Province: Province of Sondrio (SO)
- Frazioni: Acqua, Centro

Area
  - Total: 15.0 km^{2} (5.8 sq mi)
- Elevation: 520 m (1,710 ft)

Population (Dec. 2004)
  - Total: 2,000
  - Density: 130/km^{2} (350/sq mi)
- Demonym: Tresiviaschi o Tresiviesi
- Time zone: UTC+1 (CET)
  - Summer (DST): UTC+2 (CEST)
- Postal code: 23020
- Dialing code: 0342
- Website: Official website

Tresivio is a comune (municipality) in the Province of Sondrio in the Italian region Lombardy, located about 100 kilometres (62 mi) northeast of Milan and about 6 kilometres (4 mi) east of Sondrio. As of 31 December 2004, it had a population of 2,000 and an area of 15.0 square kilometres (5.8 mi^{2}).

The municipality of Tresivio contains the frazioni (subdivisions, mainly villages and hamlets) Acqua and Centro.

Tresivio borders the following municipalities: Montagna in Valtellina, Piateda, Poggiridenti, Ponte in Valtellina.

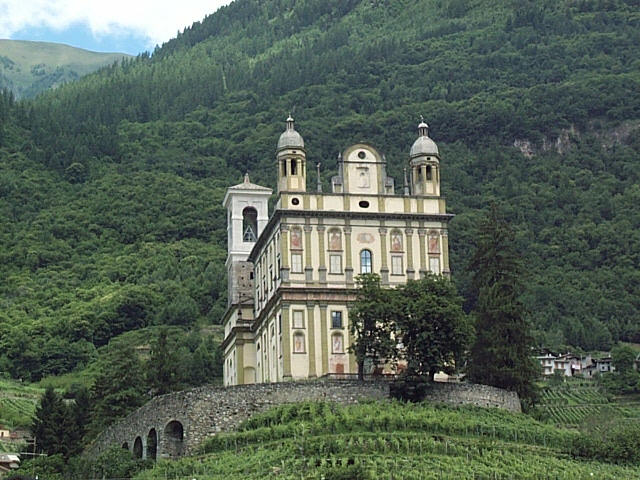
Santa Casa Lauretana in Tresivio

Tresivio hosts a Roman Catholic sanctuary dedicated to the Black Madonna whose relic is kept into the Temple. The sanctuary was built in the 17th century on the model of the Basilica della Santa Casa in Loreto.

== Demographic evolution ==
Historical population

Year	Pop.	±%
1861	1,295	—
1871	1,475	+13.9%
1881	1,684	+14.2%
1901	1,728	+2.6%
1911	1,917	+10.9%

Year	Pop.	±%
1921	2,016	+5.2%
1931	1,690	−16.2%
1936	1,830	+8.3%
1951	1,855	+1.4%
1961	1,786	−3.7%

Year	Pop.	±%
1971	1,697	−5.0%
1981	1,792	+5.6%
1991	1,882	+5.0%
2001	1,943	+3.2%

Source: Data from ISTAT
