= Fusine =

- Comune
- Comune di Fusine
- Lake of Fusine

- Location within Italy Location within Lombardy
- Coordinates: 46°8′N 9°44′E
- Country: Italy
- Region: Lombardy
- Province: Province of Sondrio (SO)

Area
  - Total: 37.5 km^{2} (14.5 sq mi)
- Elevation: 285 m (935 ft)

Population (Dec. 2004)
  - Total: 650
  - Density: 17/km^{2} (45/sq mi)
- Time zone: UTC+1 (CET)
  - Summer (DST): UTC+2 (CEST)
- Postal code: 23010
- Dialing code: 0342
- Website: Official website

Fusine is a comune (municipality) in the Province of Sondrio in the Italian region Lombardy, located about 90 kilometres (56 mi) northeast of Milan and about 11 kilometres (7 mi) southwest of Sondrio. As of 31 December 2004, it had a population of 650 and an area of 37.5 square kilometres (14.5 mi^{2}). Its territory was historically part of Carniola.

Fusine borders the following municipalities: Berbenno di Valtellina, Cedrasco, Colorina, Foppolo, Forcola, Postalesio, Tartano.

== Demographic evolution ==
Historical population

Year	Pop.	±%
1861	645	—
1871	772	+19.7%
1881	816	+5.7%
1901	893	+9.4%
1911	975	+9.2%

Year	Pop.	±%
1921	906	−7.1%
1931	836	−7.7%
1936	847	+1.3%
1951	843	−0.5%
1961	848	+0.6%

Year	Pop.	±%
1971	765	−9.8%
1981	705	−7.8%
1991	652	−7.5%
2001	657	+0.8%

Source: Data from ISTAT
