= Lanzada =

- Comune
- Comune di Lanzada
- Location within Italy Location within Lombardy
- Coordinates: 46°16′N 9°52′E
- Country: Italy
- Region: Lombardy
- Province: Province of Sondrio (SO)

Area
  - Total: 116.1 km^{2} (44.8 sq mi)
- Elevation: 1,000 m (3,300 ft)

Population (Dec. 2004)
  - Total: 1,445
  - Density: 12.45/km^{2} (32.24/sq mi)
- Time zone: UTC+1 (CET)
  - Summer (DST): UTC+2 (CEST)
- Postal code: 23020
- Dialing code: 0342
- Website: Official website

Lanzada is a comune (municipality) in the Province of Sondrio in the Italian region Lombardy, located about 150 kilometres (93 mi) northeast of Milan and 18 kilometres (11 mi) north of Sondrio, on the border with Switzerland. As of 31 December 2004, it had a population of 1,445 and an area of 116.1 square kilometres (44.8 mi^{2}).

Lanzada borders the following municipalities: Caspoggio, Chiesa in Valmalenco, Chiuro, Montagna in Valtellina, Pontresina (Switzerland), Poschiavo (Switzerland), Samedan (Switzerland), Sils im Engadin/Segl (Switzerland).

== Demographic evolution ==
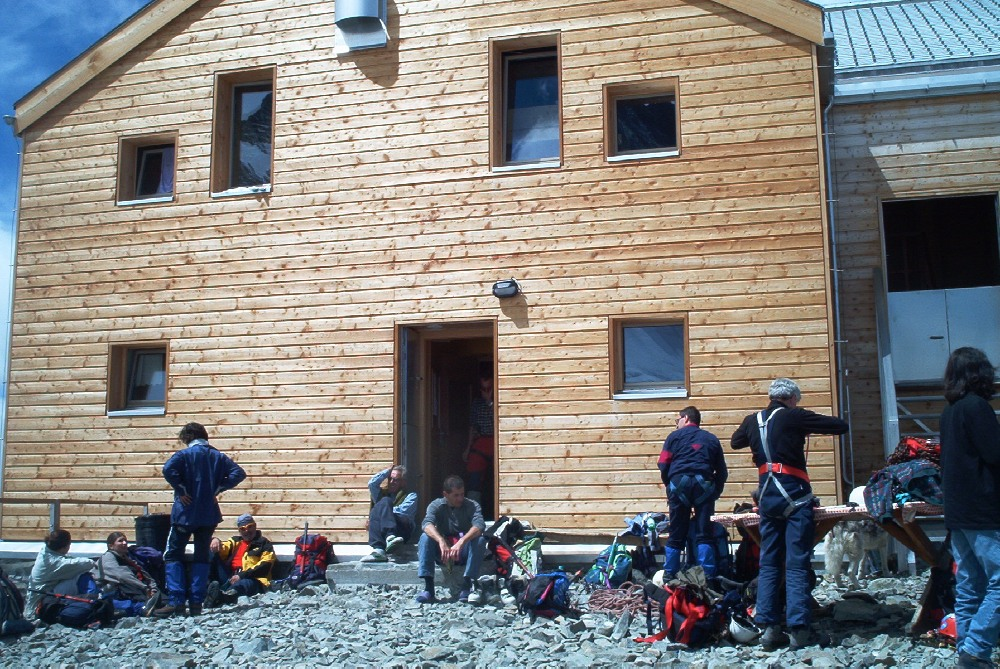
Marco e Rosa Hut

Historical population

Year	Pop.	±%
1861	858	—
1871	959	+11.8%
1881	1,067	+11.3%
1901	1,135	+6.4%
1911	1,415	+24.7%

Year	Pop.	±%
1921	1,377	−2.7%
1931	1,254	−8.9%
1936	1,250	−0.3%
1951	1,536	+22.9%
1961	1,784	+16.1%

Year	Pop.	±%
1971	1,729	−3.1%
1981	1,657	−4.2%
1991	1,520	−8.3%
2001	1,440	−5.3%

Source: Data from ISTAT

== See also ==
- Marco e Rosa Hut
