= Matteo Togninalli =

Italian engineer (born 1977)

- Born: 25 September 1977 (age 48); Sondrio, Italy
- Education: Milan Polytechnic
- Occupation: Engineer
- Employer: Scuderia Ferrari
- Known for: Formula One engineer
- Title: Head of track engineering

Matteo Togninalli (born 25 September 1977) is an Italian Formula One engineer. He is currently the Head of Track Engineering at the Scuderia Ferrari Formula One team.

== Career ==
In 2003, Togninalli graduated from the Milan Polytechnic with a degree in Mechanical Engineering, after which he joined Fiat’s research centre, which is where he first garnered the interest of working at Ferrari. In 2005, he started working with the Ferrari Remote Garage and two years later, he joined the team as a Vehicle Dynamics Engineer. In 2010, he became Head of Race Performance Engineering. In 2016, he was promoted to the head of the Track Engineering Department, a role which involved coordinating all track engineering over a race weekend from a technical perspective whilst also leading the Race Performance Engineering group in Maranello.
