= San Martino, Castione Andevenno =

Church building in Castione Andevenno, Italy

San Martino is a Neoclassical-style, Roman Catholic church located on in the town of Castione Andevenno in the province of Sondrio, region of Lombardy, Italy.

== History ==
The present church was erected at the site of a prior church. In the Sacristy is a small obelisk with an iron cross dating reconstruction to 1717. The architect was Gaspare Aprile. The interior has a main altar designed by Bernardo Bianchi and Alessandro Casella. Among the interior altarpieces are works by Antonio Caimi and Cesare Ligari.

Attached to the church is the oratory of the Blessed Virgin, and an 18th-century Ossuary.
