= Piateda =

- Comune
- Comune di Piateda
- Location within Italy Location within Lombardy
- Coordinates: 46°10′N 9°56′E
- Country: Italy
- Region: Lombardy
- Province: Province of Sondrio (SO)

Area
  - Total: 70.9 km^{2} (27.4 sq mi)

Population (Dec. 2004)
  - Total: 2,291
  - Density: 32.3/km^{2} (83.7/sq mi)
- Time zone: UTC+1 (CET)
  - Summer (DST): UTC+2 (CEST)
- Postal code: 23020
- Dialing code: 0342
- Website: Official website

Piateda is a comune (municipality) in the Province of Sondrio in the Italian region Lombardy, located about 100 kilometres (62 mi) northeast of Milan and about 5 kilometres (3 mi) east of Sondrio. As of 31 December 2004, it had a population of 2,291 and an area of 70.9 square kilometres (27.4 mi^{2}).

Piateda borders the following municipalities: Albosaggia, Caiolo, Carona, Faedo Valtellino, Montagna in Valtellina, Poggiridenti, Ponte in Valtellina, Tresivio, Valbondione.

It is located alongside the Adda river.

== Demographic evolution ==
Historical population

Year	Pop.	±%
1861	1,380	—
1871	1,474	+6.8%
1881	1,650	+11.9%
1901	1,918	+16.2%
1911	2,069	+7.9%

Year	Pop.	±%
1921	2,012	−2.8%
1931	2,171	+7.9%
1936	2,464	+13.5%
1951	2,422	−1.7%
1961	2,307	−4.7%

Year	Pop.	±%
1971	2,241	−2.9%
1981	2,329	+3.9%
1991	2,423	+4.0%
2001	2,320	−4.3%

Source: Data from ISTAT
