= Caiolo =

Caiolo Cajoeul (Lombard)
- Comune
- Comune di Caiolo
- Location within Italy Location within Lombardy
- Coordinates: 46°9′N 9°48′E
- Country: Italy
- Region: Lombardy
- Province: Province of Sondrio (SO)

Area
  - Total: 33.3 km^{2} (12.9 sq mi)

Population (Dec. 2004)
  - Total: 994
  - Density: 29.8/km^{2} (77.3/sq mi)
- Time zone: UTC+1 (CET)
  - Summer (DST): UTC+2 (CEST)
- Postal code: 23010
- Dialing code: 0342
- Website: Official website

Caiolo (Lombard: Cajoeul) is a comune (municipality) in the Province of Sondrio in the Italian region of Lombardy, located about 90 kilometres (56 mi) northeast of Milan and about 5 kilometres (3 mi) southwest of Sondrio. As of 31 December 2004, it had a population of 994 and an area of 33.3 square kilometres (12.9 mi^{2}).

Caiolo borders the following municipalities: Albosaggia, Carona, Castione Andevenno, Cedrasco, Foppolo, Piateda, Postalesio, Sondrio.

The church of San Vittore has Renaissance frescoes by Vincenzo De Barberis.

== Demographic evolution ==
Historical population

Year	Pop.	±%
1861	887	—
1871	1,087	+22.5%
1881	1,256	+15.5%
1901	1,330	+5.9%
1911	1,416	+6.5%

Year	Pop.	±%
1921	1,383	−2.3%
1931	1,257	−9.1%
1936	1,160	−7.7%
1951	1,101	−5.1%
1961	1,025	−6.9%

Year	Pop.	±%
1971	948	−7.5%
1981	947	−0.1%
1991	903	−4.6%
2001	956	+5.9%

Source: Data from ISTAT
