= Ponte in Valtellina =

- Comune
- Comune di Ponte in Valtellina
- Coat of arms

- Location within Italy Location within Lombardy
- Coordinates: 46°11′N 9°59′E
- Country: Italy
- Region: Lombardy
- Province: Province of Sondrio (SO)

Area
  - Total: 69.5 km^{2} (26.8 sq mi)
- Elevation: 500 m (1,600 ft)

Population (Dec. 2004)
  - Total: 2,222
  - Density: 32.0/km^{2} (82.8/sq mi)
- Time zone: UTC+1 (CET)
  - Summer (DST): UTC+2 (CEST)
- Postal code: 23026
- Dialing code: 0342
- Website: Official website

Ponte in Valtellina is a comune (municipality) in the Province of Sondrio in the Italian region Lombardy, located about 100 kilometres (62 mi) northeast of Milan and about 9 kilometres (6 mi) east of Sondrio. As of 31 December 2004, it had a population of 2,222 and an area of 69.5 square kilometres (26.8 mi^{2}).

Ponte in Valtellina borders the following municipalities: Castello dell'Acqua, Chiuro, Montagna in Valtellina, Piateda, Teglio, Tresivio, Valbondione.

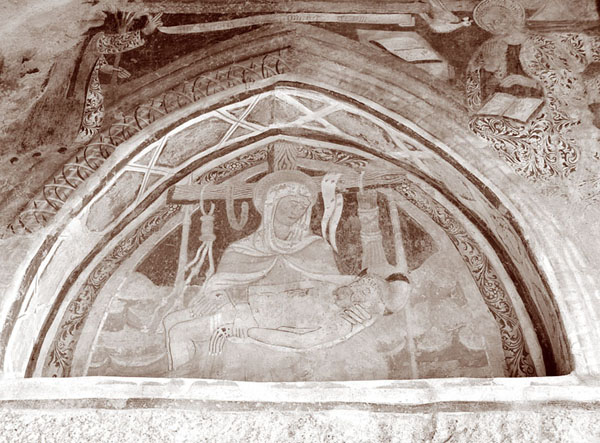
Fresco of the Church of San Rocco

== Demographic evolution ==
Historical population

Year	Pop.	±%
1861	3,048	—
1871	3,187	+4.6%
1881	3,486	+9.4%
1901	3,216	−7.7%
1911	3,633	+13.0%

Year	Pop.	±%
1921	3,650	+0.5%
1931	3,348	−8.3%
1936	3,310	−1.1%
1951	3,152	−4.8%
1961	2,962	−6.0%

Year	Pop.	±%
1971	2,563	−13.5%
1981	2,329	−9.1%
1991	2,239	−3.9%
2001	2,252	+0.6%

Source: Data from ISTAT
