= Luigi Torelli =

Italian politician

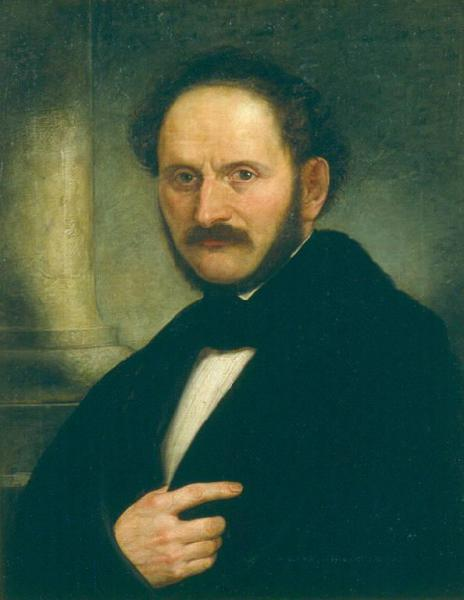
Luigi Torelli, by Antonio Caimi

Luigi Torelli (9 February 1810 – 14 November 1887) was born in Villa di Tirano, in the Valtellina of Lombardy, at the time part of the Napoleonic Kingdom of Italy.

Being a patriot, he took part in the Five Days of Milan, most noted in driving out the Tyrolian Kaiserjäger from Piazza del Duomo and, together with fellow patriot Scipione Bagaggia, for raising the tri-colour atop the Cathedral.

Torelli was a member of diverse scientific and economic institutions. In 1860 he was made a Senator and in 1864 became Minister of Agriculture, Industry and Commerce of the Kingdom of Italy.

He died at Tirano in 1887.

== Recognition ==
The Marconi-class submarine Luigi Torelli fought for Italy in World War 2 and was named after him. The submarine was notable for serving under all three Axis powers - Italy until it surrendered, later Germany until it was defeated and then finally Imperial Japan.
