= Faedo Valtellino =

- Comune
- Comune di Faedo Valtellino
- Location within Italy Location within Lombardy
- Coordinates: 46°09′11″N 9°54′22″E
- Country: Italy
- Region: Lombardy
- Province: Sondrio (SO)

Government
  - Mayor: Franco Angelini

Area
  - Total: 4.8 km^{2} (1.9 sq mi)
- Elevation: 557 m (1,827 ft)

Population (31 July 2017).
  - Total: 548
  - Density: 110/km^{2} (300/sq mi)
- Demonym: Faet
- Time zone: UTC+1 (CET)
  - Summer (DST): UTC+2 (CEST)
- Postal code: 23100
- Dialing code: 0342
- Website: Official website

Faedo Valtellino is a comune (municipality) in the Province of Sondrio in the Italian region Lombardy, located about 90 kilometres (56 mi) northeast of Milan and about 3 kilometres (2 mi) southeast of Sondrio.

Faedo Valtellino borders the municipalities of Albosaggia, Montagna in Valtellina, Piateda, and Sondrio.
