= San Vittore, Caiolo =

Church building in Caiolo, Italy

San Vittore is a Roman Catholic parish church located on in the town of Caiolo in the province of Sondrio, region of Lombardy, Italy.

== History ==
The present church was built in 1617 atop the ruins of a prior medieval church. It is accessed via unpaved road that rises to an overlook over the river Livrio at the valley bed.

The exterior of the church is simple with a portico. The interiors are decorated with Baroque stucco work and paintings from the 17th and 18th centuries. The wooden entrance door is dated 1619, and the church has four lateral chapels. The Chapel of St Anthony Abbot was dedicated by the stucco artists Alessandro Casella and Bernardo Bianchi. On the right of the nave is a wooden altarpiece frame with a painting (1539) by Vincenzo De Barberis.
