= Foppolo =

- Comune
- Comune di Foppolo
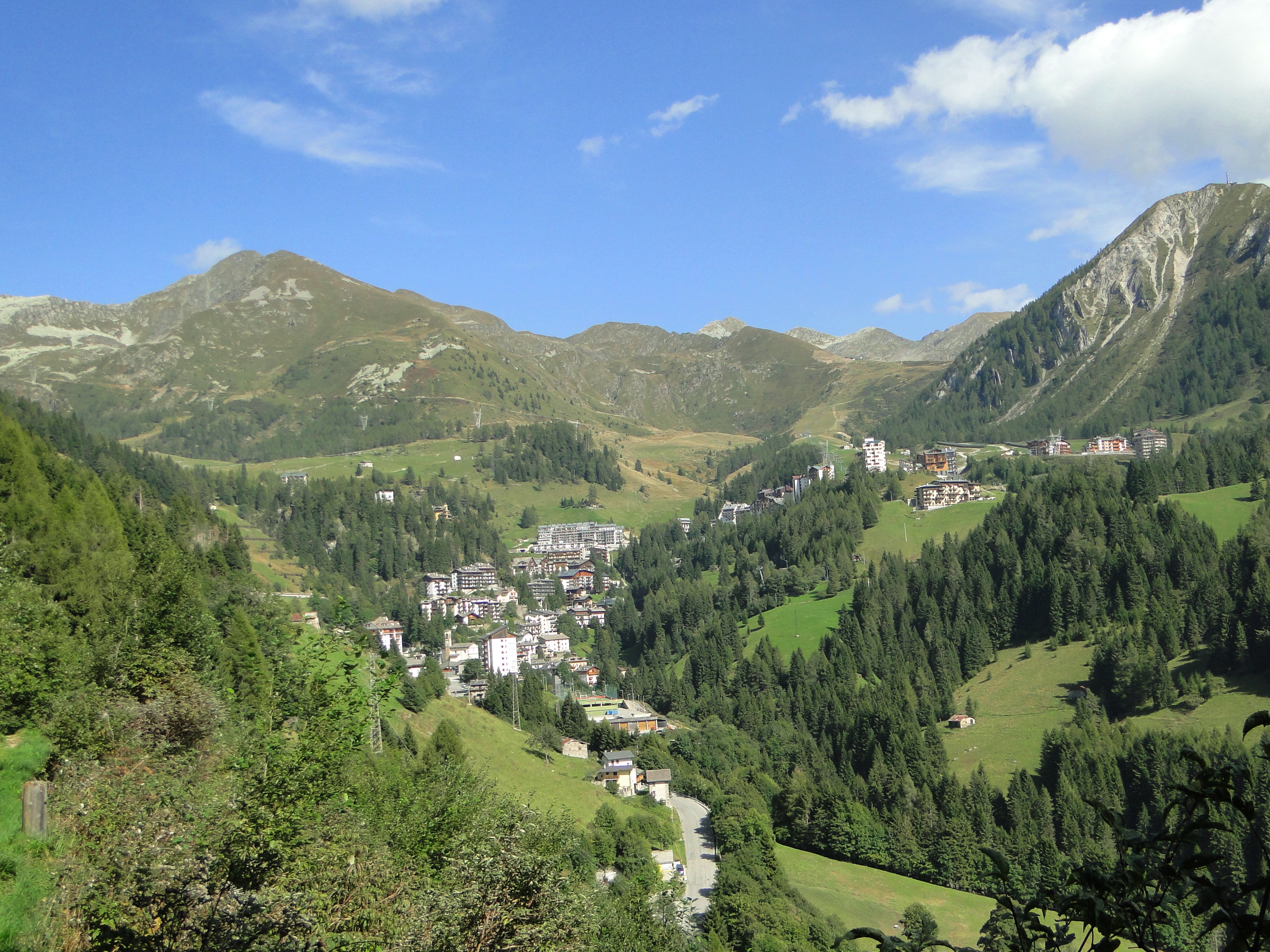
- Foppolo

- Coat of arms

- Location within Italy Location within Lombardy
- Coordinates: 46°3′N 9°45′E
- Country: Italy
- Region: Lombardy
- Province: Province of Bergamo (BG)

Government
  - Mayor: Gloria Carletti (since 2019)

Area
  - Total: 16.2 km^{2} (6.3 sq mi)
- Elevation: 1,508 m (4,948 ft)

Population (Dec. 2004)
  - Total: 206
  - Density: 12.7/km^{2} (32.9/sq mi)
- Demonym: Foppolesi
- Time zone: UTC+1 (CET)
  - Summer (DST): UTC+2 (CEST)
- Postal code: 24010
- Dialing code: 0345

Foppolo (Bergamasque: Fòpol) is a comune (municipality) in the Province of Bergamo in the Italian region of Lombardy, located about 120 kilometres (75 mi) northeast of Milan and about 60 kilometres (37 mi) north of Bergamo. As of 31 December 2004, it had a population of 206 and an area of 16.2 square kilometres (6.3 mi^{2}).

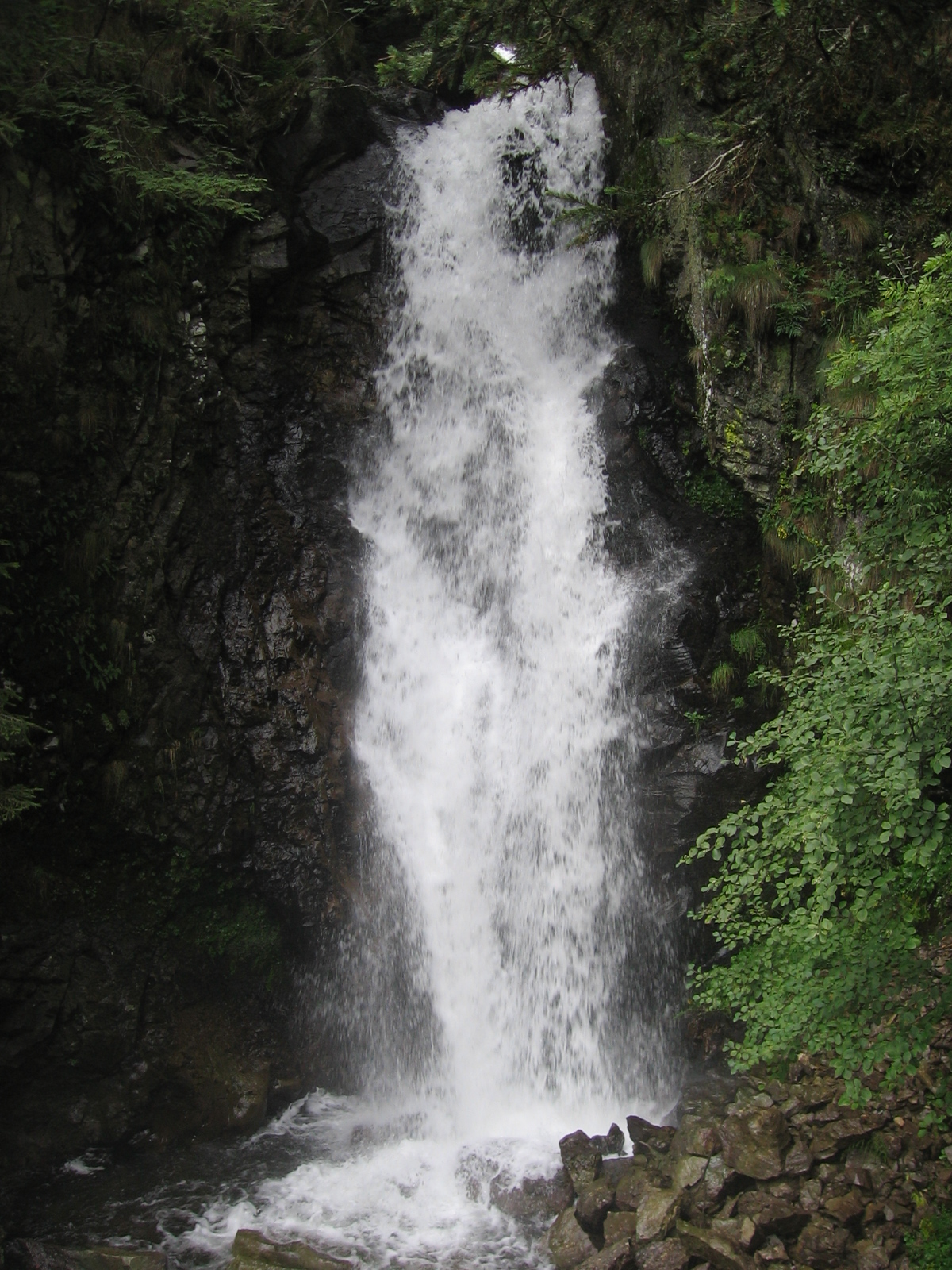
Waterfall

Foppolo borders the following municipalities: Caiolo, Carona, Cedrasco, Fusine, Tartano, Valleve.

On January 12, 1977, an avalanche buried part of the village and killed eight people.

== Winter Sports ==
In the winter Foppolo becomes an important resort in the province of Bergamo, with a large amount of ski slopes. The resort is linked by piste to the resort of Carona Carisole, creating an area with 12 lifts serving 26 runs, with an area of 30 km and a height drop from 2200m to 1635m.

== Demographic evolution ==
Historical population

Year	Pop.	±%
1861	172	—
1871	282	+64.0%
1881	255	−9.6%
1901	102	−60.0%
1911	125	+22.5%

Year	Pop.	±%
1921	134	+7.2%
1931	136	+1.5%
1936	126	−7.4%
1951	147	+16.7%
1961	154	+4.8%

Year	Pop.	±%
1971	203	+31.8%
1981	204	+0.5%
1991	193	−5.4%
2001	208	+7.8%

Source: Data from ISTAT
