= Chiuro =

Chiuro Ciür (Lombard)
- Comune
- Comune di Chiuro
- Location within Italy Location within Lombardy
- Coordinates: 46°10′N 9°59′E
- Country: Italy
- Region: Lombardy
- Province: Province of Sondrio (SO)
- Frazioni: Castionetto, Casacce

Area
  - Total: 51.8 km^{2} (20.0 sq mi)
- Elevation: 390 m (1,280 ft)

Population (Dec. 2004)
  - Total: 2,499
  - Density: 48.2/km^{2} (125/sq mi)
- Demonym: Chiuraschi
- Time zone: UTC+1 (CET)
  - Summer (DST): UTC+2 (CEST)
- Postal code: 23030
- Dialing code: 0342
- Website: Official website

Chiuro (Lombard: Ciür) is a comune (municipality) in the Province of Sondrio in the Italian region of Lombardy, located about 100 kilometres (62 mi) northeast of Milan and about 9 kilometres (6 mi) east of Sondrio, on the border with Switzerland. As of 31 December 2004, it had a population of 2,499 and an area of 51.8 square kilometres (20.0 mi^{2}).

The municipality of Chiuro contains the frazioni (subdivisions, mainly villages and hamlets) Castionetto and Casacce.

Chiuro borders the following municipalities: Brusio (Switzerland), Castello dell'Acqua, Lanzada, Montagna in Valtellina, Ponte in Valtellina, Poschiavo (Switzerland), Teglio.

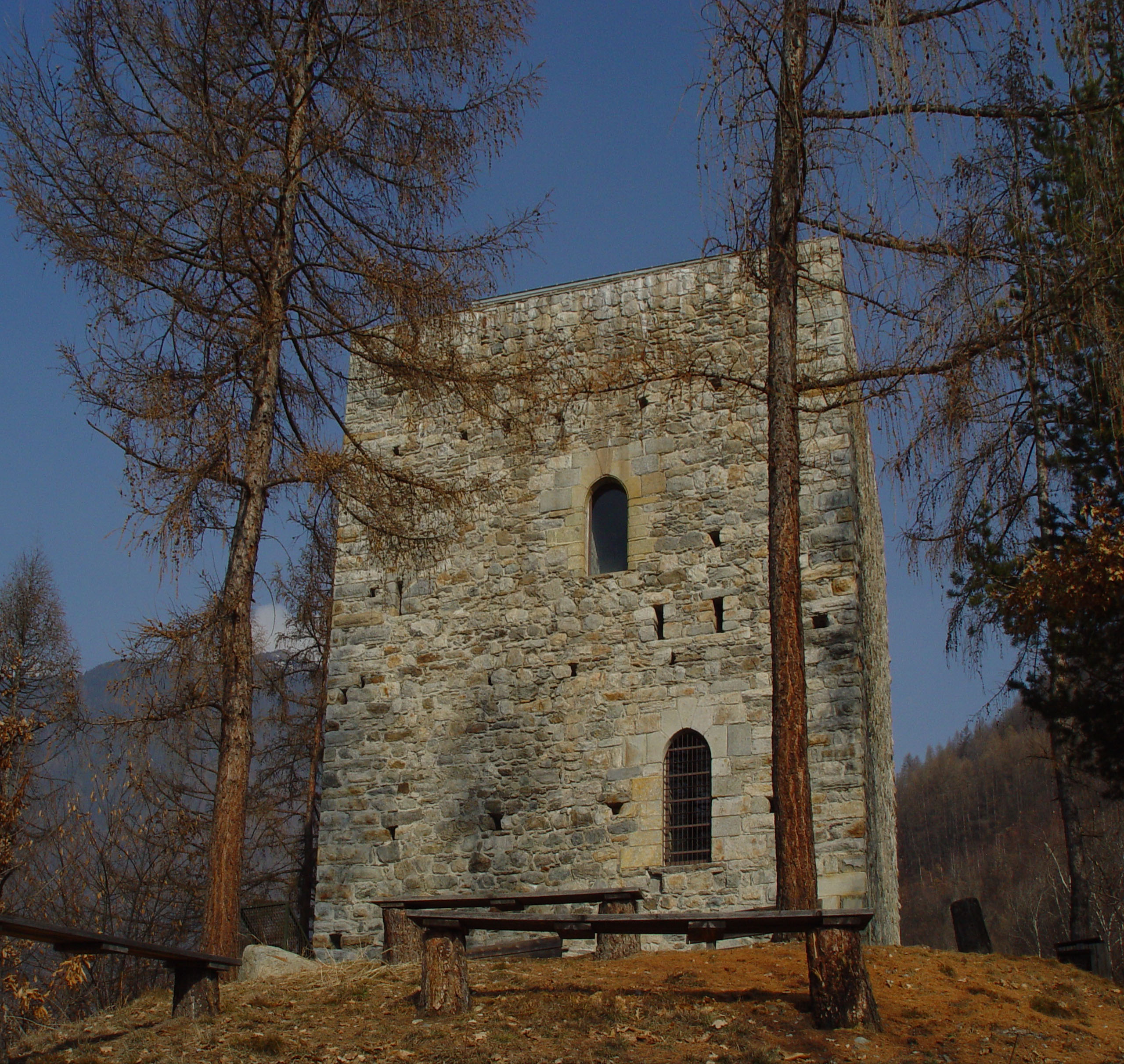
the medieval tower

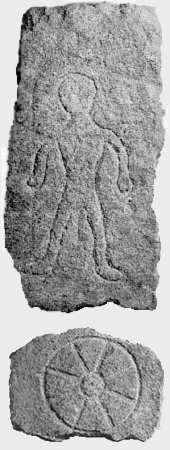
prehistoric finds in chiuro

== Demographic evolution ==
Historical population

Year	Pop.	±%
1861	1,527	—
1871	1,679	+10.0%
1881	1,733	+3.2%
1901	1,692	−2.4%
1911	1,731	+2.3%

Year	Pop.	±%
1921	1,771	+2.3%
1931	1,886	+6.5%
1936	1,811	−4.0%
1951	1,819	+0.4%
1961	1,793	−1.4%

Year	Pop.	±%
1971	2,101	+17.2%
1981	2,410	+14.7%
1991	2,427	+0.7%
2001	2,495	+2.8%

Source: Data from ISTAT
