= Castione Andevenno =

- Comune
- Comune di Castione Andevenno
- Location within Italy Location within Lombardy
- Coordinates: 46°10′N 9°48′E
- Country: Italy
- Region: Lombardy
- Province: Province of Sondrio (SO)

Area
  - Total: 17.1 km^{2} (6.6 sq mi)

Population (Dec. 2004)
  - Total: 1,545
  - Density: 90.4/km^{2} (234/sq mi)
- Time zone: UTC+1 (CET)
  - Summer (DST): UTC+2 (CEST)
- Postal code: 23012
- Dialing code: 0342
- Website: Official website

Castione Andevenno is a comune (municipality) in the Province of Sondrio in the Italian region Lombardy, located about 90 kilometres (56 mi) northeast of Milan and about 5 kilometres (3 mi) west of Sondrio. As of 31 December 2004, it had a population of 1,545 and an area of 17.1 square kilometres (6.6 mi^{2}).

Castione Andevenno borders the following municipalities: Albosaggia, Caiolo, Postalesio, Sondrio, Torre di Santa Maria.

The 18th-century church of San Martino is found in the territory.

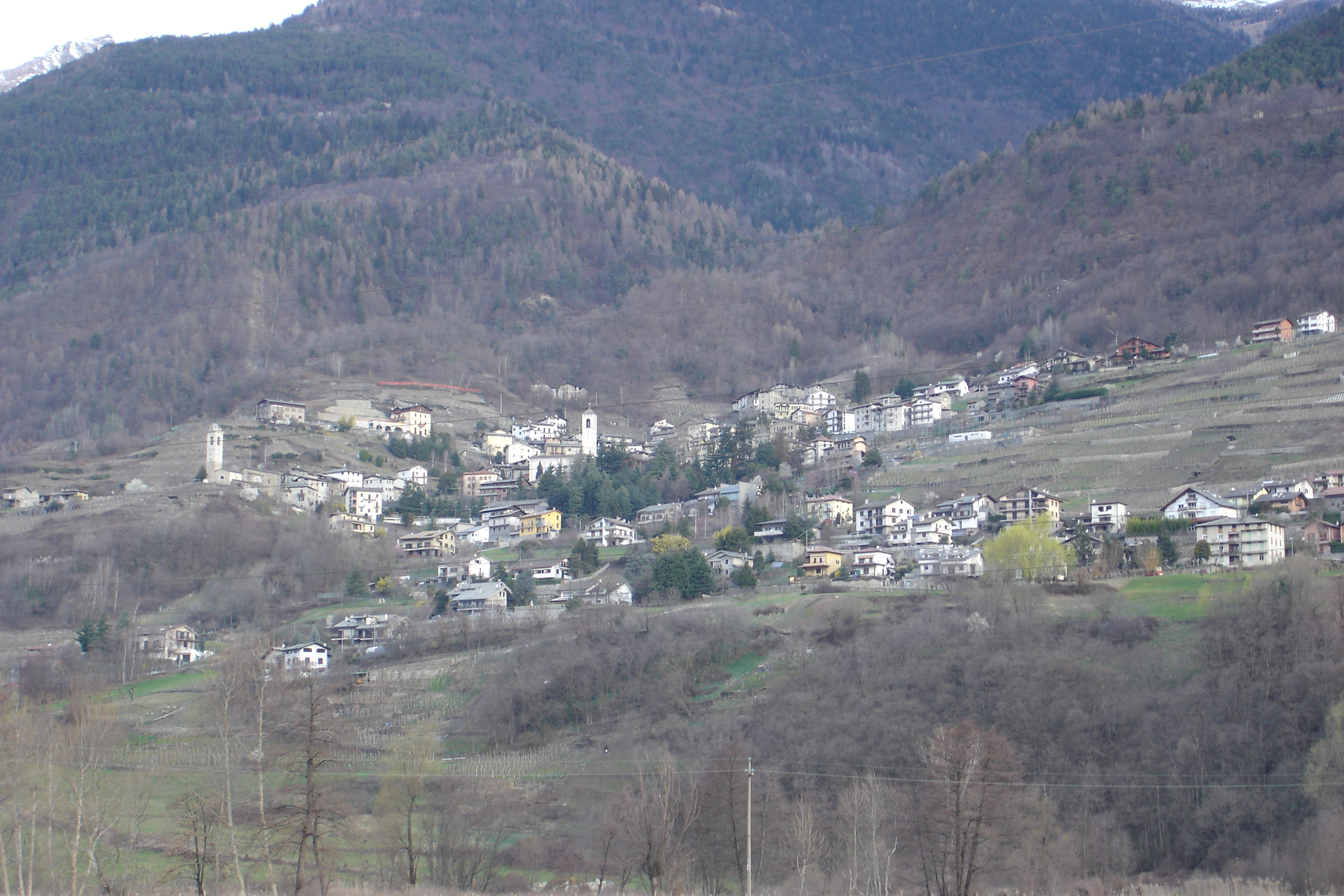
view of the town

== Demographic evolution ==
Historical population

Year	Pop.	±%
1861	1,339	—
1871	1,440	+7.5%
1881	1,660	+15.3%
1901	1,818	+9.5%
1911	1,785	−1.8%

Year	Pop.	±%
1921	1,731	−3.0%
1931	1,656	−4.3%
1936	1,675	+1.1%
1951	1,617	−3.5%
1961	1,514	−6.4%

Year	Pop.	±%
1971	1,519	+0.3%
1981	1,571	+3.4%
1991	1,585	+0.9%
2001	1,553	−2.0%

Source: Data from ISTAT
