= Montagna in Valtellina =

- Comune
- Comune di Montagna in Valtellina
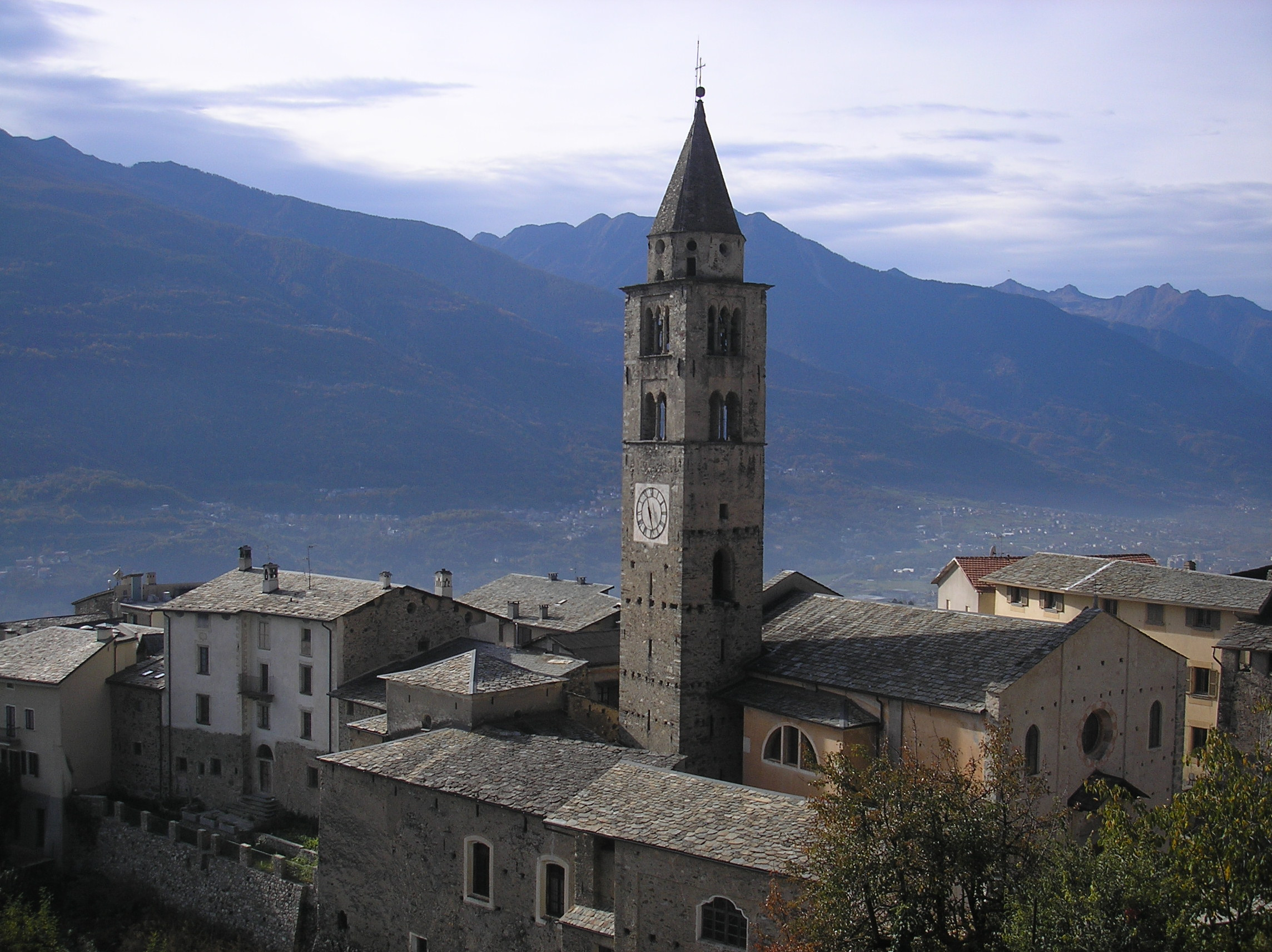

- Coat of arms

- Location within Italy Location within Lombardy
- Coordinates: 46°11′N 9°54′E
- Country: Italy
- Region: Lombardy
- Province: Sondrio (SO)

Government
  - Mayor: Barbara Baldini

Area
  - Total: 48 km^{2} (19 sq mi)
- Elevation: 567 m (1,860 ft)

Population (31 December 2010)
  - Total: 3,059
  - Density: 64/km^{2} (170/sq mi)
- Demonym: Montagnoni
- Time zone: UTC+1 (CET)
  - Summer (DST): UTC+2 (CEST)
- Postal code: 23020
- Dialing code: 0342
- Website: Official website

Montagna in Valtellina is a comune (municipality) in the Province of Sondrio in the Italian region Lombardy, located about 100 kilometres (62 mi) northeast of Milan and about 3 kilometres (2 mi) northeast of Sondrio.

Montagna in Valtellina borders the following municipalities: Caspoggio, Chiuro, Faedo Valtellino, Lanzada, Piateda, Poggiridenti, Ponte in Valtellina, Sondrio, Spriana, Torre di Santa Maria, Tresivio.
