= San Fedele, Poggiridenti =

Church in Italy

Coordinates: 46°10′33″N 9°55′47″E

San Fedele is a Roman Catholic church located on in the town of Poggiridenti in the province of Sondrio, region of Lombardy, Italy.

== History ==
The present church is set on a scenic location overlooking the valley. The complex consists of buildings of different eras, including: a Romanesque bell-tower refurbished in the 17th century, a 16th-century chapel, a 17th-century oratory, and an 18th-century oratory dedicated to Jesus Christ Savior. The chapel has a fresco depicting an Enthroned Madonna and Child with Saints (1528) by Fermo Stella.

The facade has a rounded tympanum with the coat of arms of the Nobili family, and with bas reliefs. The interior has four lateral chapels with 18th-century decoration. The apse has an 18th-century wooden choir stalls.
