= Antonio Caimi =

Italian painter (1814–1878)

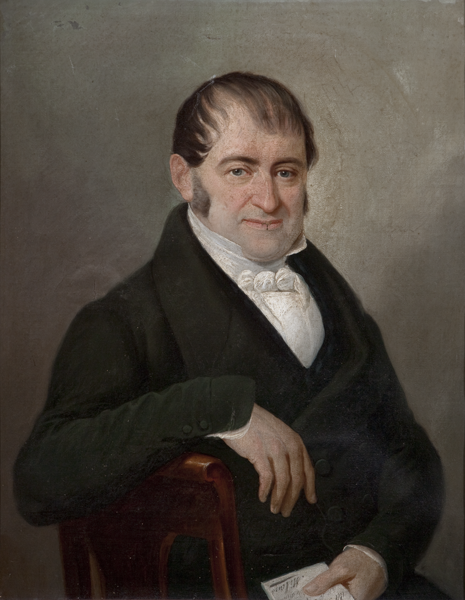
Antonio Caimi, by an unknown artist

Antonio Giacomo Caimi (16 April 1811, Sondrio – 5 January 1878, Milan) was an Italian portrait painter, author, and professor at the Brera Academy.

== Biography ==
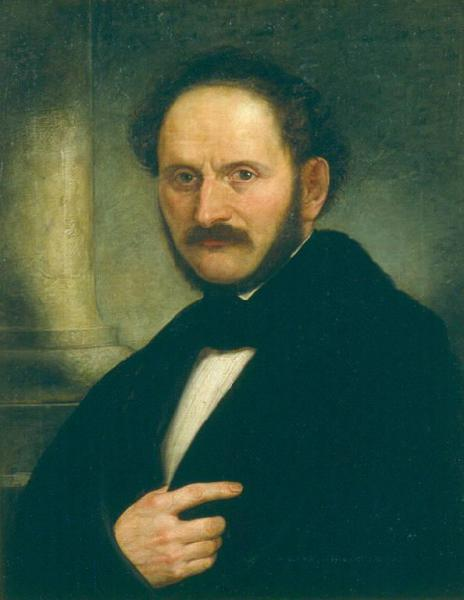
Portrait of Luigi Torelli

He trained initially at the Accademia Carrara in Bergamo under Giuseppe Diotti, then moved to the Brera Academy, where he studied with Luigi Sabatelli. After graduating, he spent some time copying the Old Masters in Florence and Rome. He was also influenced by the works of his friend, Francesco Hayez.

Throughout the 1840s, he exhibited in Milan, at the Academy then, in the 1850s, focused on the "Society for the Promotion of Fine Arts" in Turin. His painting of Columbus, explaining his plans to reach India, was purchased by Charles Albert of Sardinia.

In 1860, he became a teacher at the Academy and served as its Secretary. He also served on several commissions and committees, including one that oversaw archaeological projects for the Province of Sondrio. In 1876, he was on a commission that supervised preservation of the monuments at the Church of San Giovanni in Conca, which was due to be demolished. The church was emptied of its art in the 1890s and was essentially a warehouse, until its actual demolition after World War II.

His best known book was Delle arti del designo e degli artisti nelle provincie di Lombardia dal 1777 al 1862 (The Arts of Design, and the Lombardian Artists from 1777 to 1862), published on the occasion of the International Exhibition in London.

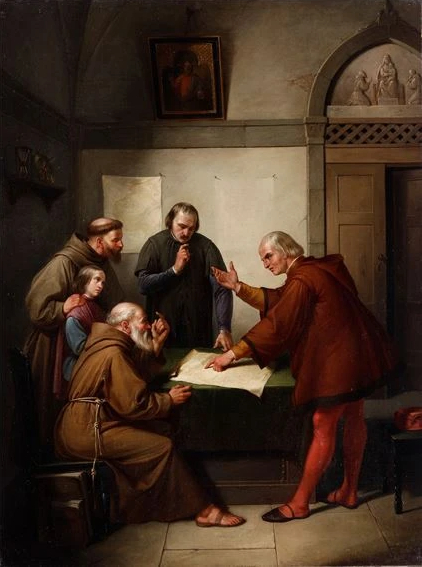
Columbus explains his plan to reach India to Father Juan Pérez

In 1873, he published two works on the history and contents of local museums: Cenno storico sul museo patrio di archeologia in Milano (The Civic Archaeological Museum) and La pinacoteca della Regia Accademia di Belle Arti in Milano (The gallery at the Brera Academy).
