= Sondrio =

City in Lombardy, Italy

Sondrio Sùndri (Lombard)
- Comune
- Città di Sondrio
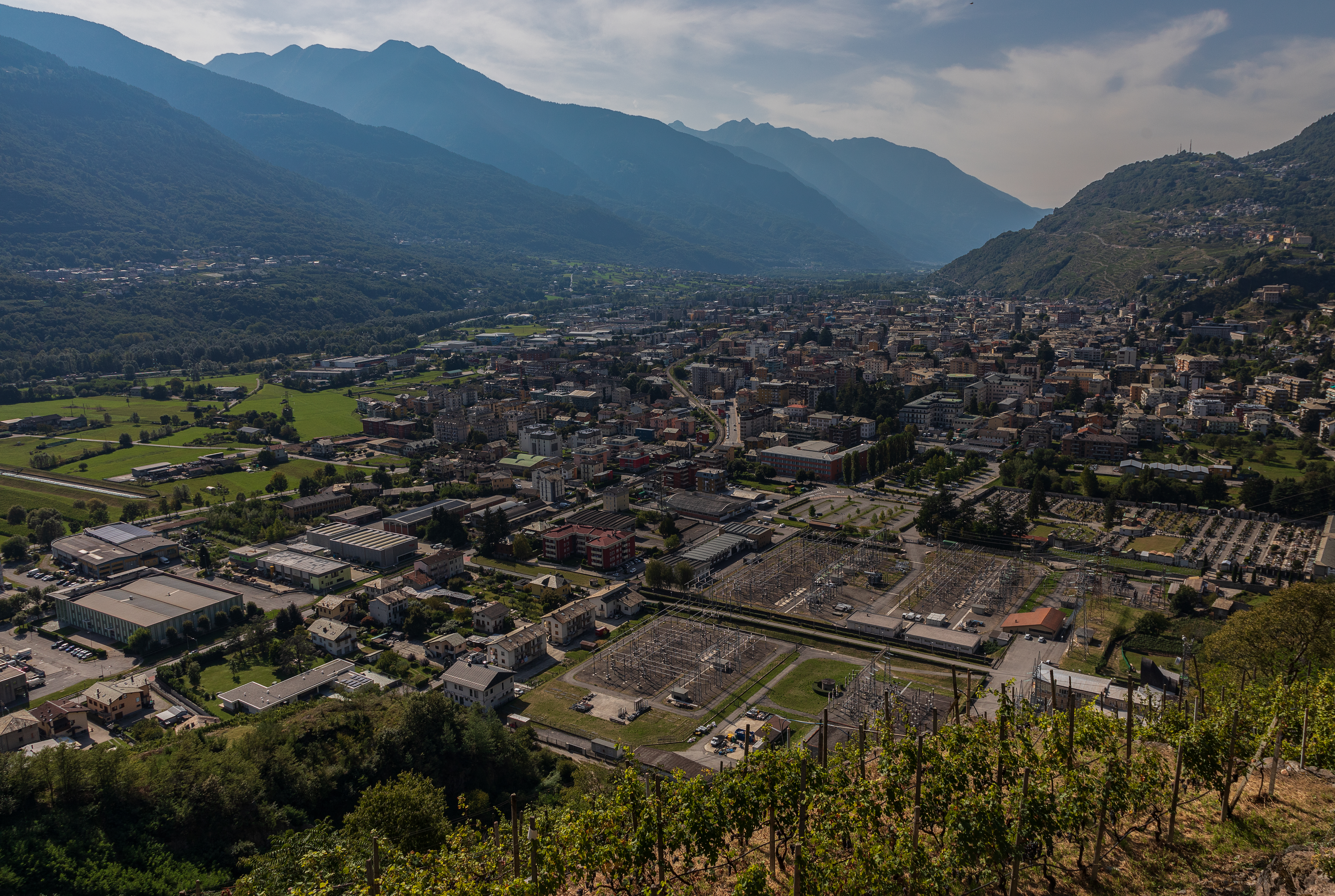
- Panoramic view Sondrio

- Flag Coat of arms

- Sondrio within the Province of Sondrio

- Location within Italy Location within Lombardy
- Coordinates: 46°10′N 09°52′E
- Country: Italy
- Region: Lombardy
- Province: Sondrio (SO)
- Frazioni: Arquino, Colda, Gualtieri, Ligari, Moroni, Mossini, Ponchiera, Sant'Anna, Sassella, Triangia, Triasso

Government
  - Mayor: Marco Scaramellini (Lega Nord)

Area
  - Total: 20.88 km^{2} (8.06 sq mi)
- Elevation: 360 m (1,180 ft)

Population (31 December 2024)
  - Total: 21,373
  - Density: 1,024/km^{2} (2,651/sq mi)
- Demonym: Sondriesi
- Time zone: UTC+1 (CET)
  - Summer (DST): UTC+2 (CEST)
- Postal code: 23100
- Dialing code: 0342
- Patron saint: Sts. Gervasius and Protasius
- Saint day: June 19
- Website: Official website

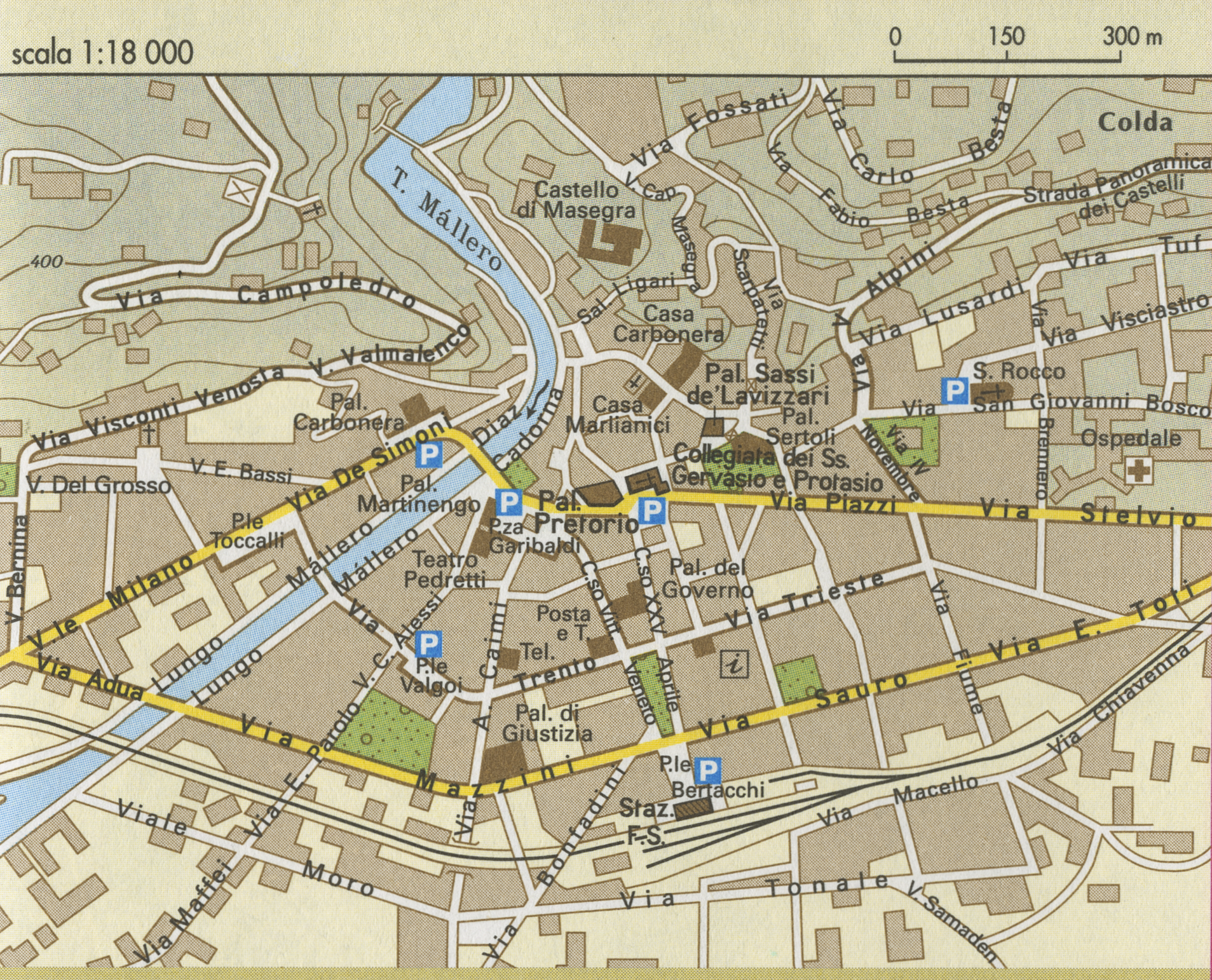
Map of city centre

Sondrio (Italian: [ˈsondrjo]; Lombard: Sùndri; Romansh: Sunder; archaic German: Sünders or Sonders; Latin: Sundrium) is an Italian city, comune and administrative centre for the province of Sondrio, located in the heart of the Valtellina. As of 2015, Sondrio counted approximately 21,876 inhabitants. In 2007, Sondrio was named the Alpine Town of the Year.

== History ==
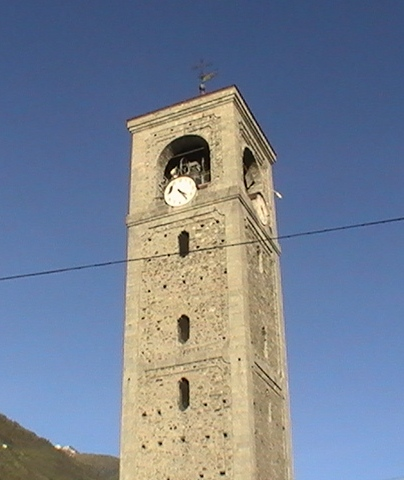
Ligariana tower

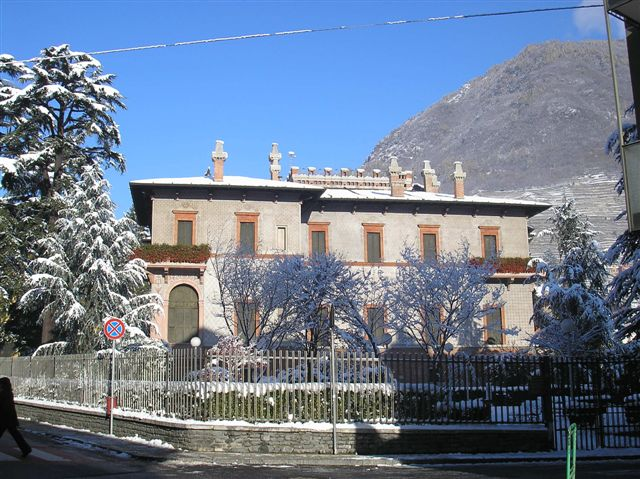
The library of Villa Quadrio

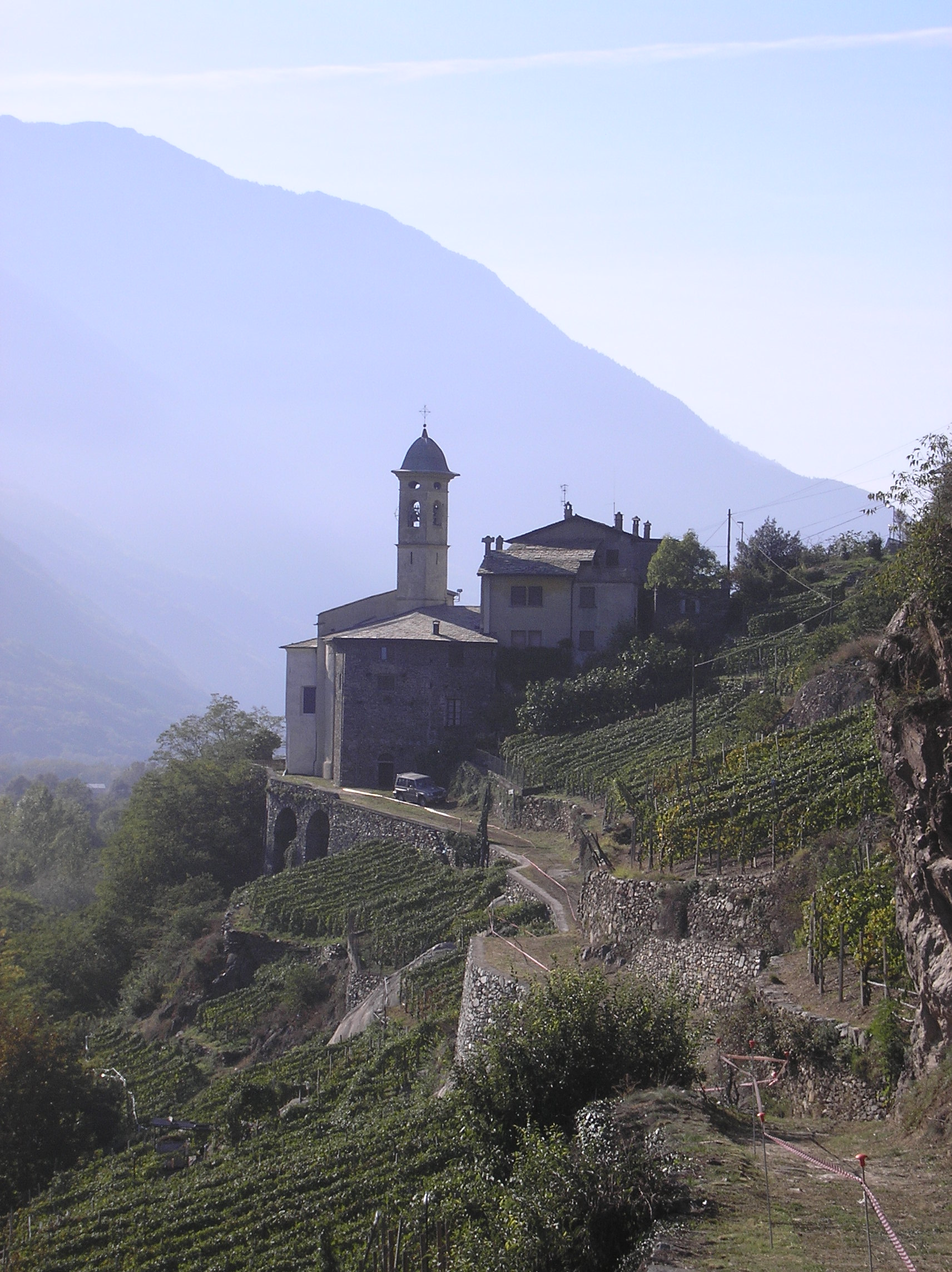
Madonna della Sassella, a nearby sanctuary.

Formerly an Ancient Roman military camp, today's Sondrio was founded by the Lombards: in their language Sundrium meant "Exclusive property", referring to the status of free men (arimanni) of the holders of the city and the surrounding land.

After the fall of the Lombard Kingdom in Italy, Sondrio became part of the Holy Roman Empire. The Capitanei of Vizzola, who controlled much of the Valtellina, had it in 1040 from the emperor Henry II. From 1310 to 1335 the city was involved in the war between the Guelph and Ghibelline factions of the nearby Como, and its war against Milan. After having resisted several attacks by the Comaschi, in 1335 Sondrio and Valtellina became part of the Visconti Milanese dominions.

From the second half of the 16th century to the end of the 18th century, Sondrio was governed by the Tre Leghe Grigie ("Three Grey Leagues") of the Grisons, as the capital city of Valtellina. After the Reformation, Sondrio was the centre of heavy struggles between the Catholic Valtellinesi and the Protestant Grisons. In 1620 the citizens, led by Giacomo Robustelli, killed 180 Protestants and declared the independence of the Valtellina.

After the Napoleonic parenthesis, in which it became part of the Cisalpine Republic (later Kingdom of Italy), Sondrio with the Valtellina was annexed to the Austrian Kingdom of Lombardy–Venetia, and fought gallantly for its independence.

== Geography ==
The town is located in the middle of the province, and borders with the municipalities of Albosaggia, Caiolo, Castione Andevenno, Faedo Valtellino, Montagna in Valtellina, Spriana and Torre di Santa Maria. Its hamlets (frazioni) are Arquino, Colda, Gualtieri, Ligari, Moroni, Mossini, Ponchiera, Sant'Anna, Sassella, Triangia and Triasso.

== Economy ==
The territory of Sondrio has numerous vineyards; wines produced include the Sassella and Grumello. Wine represents one of the main resources of this region, together with tourism, especially in spring.

Another important piece of Sondrio's economy is its banking industry, with the Banca Popolare di Sondrio and the Credito Valtellinese both headquartered in Sondrio and listed on the Milan Stock Exchange.

=== Transportation ===
There is no airport in the city. The nearest airports are Milan's Bergamo Orio al Serio Airport, Linate Airport, and Malpensa Airport.

== Main sights ==
The heart of Sondrio is its central Garibaldi Square. Not far from it is the Palazzo Sassi, home of the Art and History Museum of Valtellina. In a dominant position, near the ancient road to the Valmalenco, linking the town to Switzerland, stands the Masegra Castle, housing the Historical Museum of the Grisons Domination.

The church of Santi Gervasio e Protasio rebuilt in Neoclassical-style in 1838, was built in the 12th century as a Romanesque pieve and collegiate church. Other sights include the Torre Ligariana, once the collegiate's bell tower, and the Palazzo Pretorio, once the seat of the Grisons government.

Across the railway in direction of Milan there is the ancient Church of Maria della Sassella, which the local tradition dates back to the 10th century. In March 2021 the Roman Catholic Diocese of Como declared the church to be a diocesan Marian sanctuary.

== People ==
- Giovanni Pietro Ligario (1686–1748), painter
- Antonio Caimi (1814–1878), painter
- Enrico Sertoli (1842–1910), physiologist and histologist
- Pio Rajna (1847–1930), philologist and literary critic
- Michele Rajna (1854–1920), mathematician and astronomer
- Antonio Carini (1872–1950), physician, bacteriologist and professor
- Primo H. Zopatti (1878–1934), entrepreneur America, Zopatti Bros., Dorchester
- Pier Luigi Nervi (1891–1979), engineer
- Valerio Ricetti (1898–1952), Italian-Australian hermit
- Tomaso Buzzi (1900–1981), architect and designer
- Gianni Celati (1937–2022), writer, translator and literary critic
- Sophia Zopatti Lewis (b.1941), Olympic dressage hunter/jumper Rome 1960
- Giulio Tremonti (b. 1947), politician
- Benedetto Della Vedova (b. 1962), politician
- Raffaella "Raffy" Rossi (b. 1974), ski mountaineer and skyrunner
- Luca Colombo (b. 1984), football player
- Matteo D'Alessandro (b. 1989), football player
- Robert Antonioli (b. 1990), ski mountaineer
- Michele Boscacci (b. 1990), ski mountaineer
- Arianna Fontana (b. 1990), short track speed skater
- Lorenzo Passerini (b. 1991), conductor

== Twin towns – sister cities ==
Sondrio is twinned with:

- Radovljica, Slovenia
- São Mateus, Brazil
- Sindelfingen, Germany

== Sports ==
Sondrio Calcio is the football club of the city and currently plays in Serie D.

== Climate ==
Climate data for Sondrio (1994–2017)
Month	Jan	Feb	Mar	Apr	May	Jun	Jul	Aug	Sep	Oct	Nov	Dec	Year
Mean daily maximum °C (°F)	6.1 (43.0)	9.8 (49.6)	15.8 (60.4)	19.4 (66.9)	23.2 (73.8)	27.4 (81.3)	29.2 (84.6)	28.4 (83.1)	23.5 (74.3)	17.7 (63.9)	11.0 (51.8)	5.9 (42.6)	18.1 (64.6)
Daily mean °C (°F)	2.3 (36.1)	5.0 (41.0)	10.3 (50.5)	13.6 (56.5)	17.4 (63.3)	21.4 (70.5)	22.8 (73.0)	22.4 (72.3)	18.1 (64.6)	13.1 (55.6)	7.1 (44.8)	2.5 (36.5)	13.0 (55.4)
Mean daily minimum °C (°F)	−1.5 (29.3)	0.3 (32.5)	4.2 (39.6)	7.8 (46.0)	11.5 (52.7)	15.4 (59.7)	16.4 (61.5)	16.4 (61.5)	12.7 (54.9)	8.5 (47.3)	3.3 (37.9)	−0.8 (30.6)	7.9 (46.1)
Average precipitation mm (inches)	47 (1.9)	42 (1.7)	57 (2.2)	63 (2.5)	81 (3.2)	97 (3.8)	93 (3.7)	107 (4.2)	92 (3.6)	107 (4.2)	98 (3.9)	50 (2.0)	934 (36.9)
Average precipitation days (≥ 1.0 mm)	5	4	6	7	10	11	10	11	9	5	6	4	88
Source 1: Climi e viaggi
Source 2: Istituto Superiore per la Protezione e la Ricerca Ambientale (precipitation 1951–1980)

== See also ==
- Sondrio railway station
