= Treaty of Monzón =

1626 treaty ending the Valtellina War

The Treaty of Monçon or Treaty of Monzón was signed on 5 March 1626 by Cardinal Richelieu, the chief minister of Louis XIII and Gaspar de Guzmán, Count-Duke of Olivares, the chief minister of Philip IV of Spain, at Monçon (modern Monzón) in Aragon. It was signed in the aftermath of the French capture of Valtellina from Papal troops, ending the Valtellina War.

== Background ==
Valtellina, in Northern Italy, was vitally important to the communications between the Spanish and Austrian branches of the House of Habsburg. The Sforzas had ceded the territory to the Grison League, but there were religious conflicts due to the Valtellinesi being Catholic and their Grison masters being Protestant. Seeing an opportunity, the Spanish incited a revolt in Valtellina and eventually controlled the valley. Realizing the danger, in 1623, Venice, the Duchy of Savoy, and France formed an alliance to capture this strategic position in signing the Treaty of Paris (1623). Spain tried to maintain peace by allowing the Papacy, over which they had great influence, to control it. France did nothing as the Papal troops of Gregory XV established control over Valtellina due to the lackluster policies of Charles de la Vieuville. Gregory XV was soon afterwards succeeded by Pope Urban VIII

With the ascendancy of Richelieu, French policy changed. They claimed that due to the alliance between them and the Duke of Savoy, they had to help Savoy who was attacking Genoa, by attacking Valtellina and diverting the resources of the Spanish, who were supporters of Genoa. In 1624, French troops quickly expelled Papal troops from the valley. The irony of a Cardinal attacking the troops of a Pope was not lost on Rome, Spain, and ultra-Catholics in France.

== Negotiations ==
Urban VIII sent Cardinal Francesco Barberini, his nephew, as legate to Paris to seek peace in 1625; he was also authorized by Spain. He had the goals of stopping the fighting, compensation for insulting the Pope in Valtellina, and providing for the safety of the Catholics in the valley by not letting the Grisons regain control of the valley. After Barberini left without getting any response from Richelieu, Richelieu told the King to summon an Assembly of Notables at Fontainebleau. Richelieu spoke in favor of an advantageous peace—the wide majority agreed with him.

Eventually, the Pope raised another 6000 troops to retake Valtellina. This led the Count du Fargis, the French ambassador to Madrid, to conclude peace quickly with the Spanish on 1 January 1626. Richelieu dismissed this treaty and a new one was signed at Monçon, Aragon, on 3 March 1626.

== Terms ==
The treaty provided for the Grisons to rule over Valtellina. However, it made it so that no religion other than Roman Catholicism was allowed in the valley. Also, the Valtellina people could elect their own magistrates and judges, though subject to the approval of the Grisons. Forts in Valtellina also had to be razed. Lastly, the Valtellina people had to pay the Grisons an annual tribute to be agreed on later.

The other major consequence of the treaty was to grant equal rights to the passes to both France and Spain. Although on the face of it this was a balanced outcome it was in effect a major victory for Spain, as it meant that the Spanish Road running from Milan through the Valtelline to Tyrol could be reopened, enabling Spanish armies to travel freely between Italy and Northern Europe again.

The reopening of the Spanish Road enabled Spain to maintain its war in the Low Countries for another twenty years, and also had a crucial impact effect on the course of the Thirty Years War, as it enabled the Spanish to rush troops to Germany in the mid-1630s and thereby arrest the seemingly inexorable string of Swedish victories in the first part of that decade (notably by the Battle of Nördlingen; the Spanish army which won this victory had reached Germany by marching up the Spanish Road).

== Effects ==
The treaty was widely perceived as a betrayal by France's former allies like the Dutch, England, Venice, Savoy, and the Grisons.

This was best summed up by the Venetians describing it as

"Broken faith, false promises, secret intrigues, plain trickeries, 'Yea' in the mouth, and 'Nay' in the heart, have between them ended in a treaty...full of treachery and injury to Venice, Savoy, and the Grisons, with the sole end of satisfying Spain, since all the advantages are on her side."

They had all been tricked into thinking France was helping them, when France under Richelieu was only interested in itself. Furthermore, the aforementioned parties were angry that they were not included in the negotiations. More specifically, the Grisons disliked how their rights had been just traded away without their approval. The Venetians did not like the destruction of the forts that could protect Venice. The Duke of Savoy was insulted due to his not gaining anything and because his son received an offer to be Louis' Lieutenant in Italy. The Dutch and English were upset due to Richelieu giving them false thoughts of a league against Spain via the Treaty of Compiègne and the marriage of Henrietta Maria to Charles I.

Richelieu pretended to be very unhappy about the treaty, blaming du Fargis. Next, he worked on pacifying his allies. The Duke of Savoy was pleased when he earned a chance to get the title of king. Venice and the Grisons were given excuses, while the English were assured that the French would help them in future endeavors.

== Historical assessment ==
The result of the treaty of Monzon is a topic of debate. Richelieu wrote in his memoirs that he had 'made Spanish pride bend' and restored liberty to the passes. Early historians agreed with this ascertion, Jules Michelet wrote 'France, master of the Valtellina by arms dictated the peace of Monzon to Spain.' with Grison historian Conrad Meyer Von Knonau also writing 'France forced Spain and the Three Leagues to accept a solution serving its own interest. Some Modern assessments also similarly state The Treaty of Monzon was 'negotiated under French initiative and pressure,' forcing Spain to recognize France's right to intervene in Italy.

However, other historians disagree with this ascertion, and suggest the treaty was more favourable to Spain. Wilson writes 'Monzon represented a serious reversal for Richelieu' and that that 'Spain had won the first round.'

Others provide a more balanced viewpoint, that Monzon was a Strategic Stalemate and that it was a religious victory for the catholicism but a political compromise.

== Bibliography ==
- Acton, Baron John Emerich Edward Dalberg Acton; Ward, Sir Adolphus William; Prothero, George Walter; Benians, Ernest Alfred (1911), The Cambridge modern history, Volume 4, Cambridge, England: The University press
- Dyer, Thomas Henry (1877), Volume 3 of Modern Europe from the Fall of Constantinople to the Establishment of the German Empire, A.D. 1453-1871, London, England: G. Bell & Sons
- Harbottle, Thomas Benfield (1904), Dictionary of historical allusions, London, England: S. Sonnenschein & co., ltd.
- Vernon, Katharine Dorothea Ewart (1909), Italy from 1494 to 1790: Volume 3 of Cambridge historical series, Cambridge, England: University Press
- Wilson, Peter H. (2010). Europe's Tragedy: A History of the Thirty Years War. Penguin UK. ISBN 978-0141006147.
