= Valtellina War =

1620–1626 war in Northern Italy

- Part of the Bündner Wirren during the Thirty Years' War
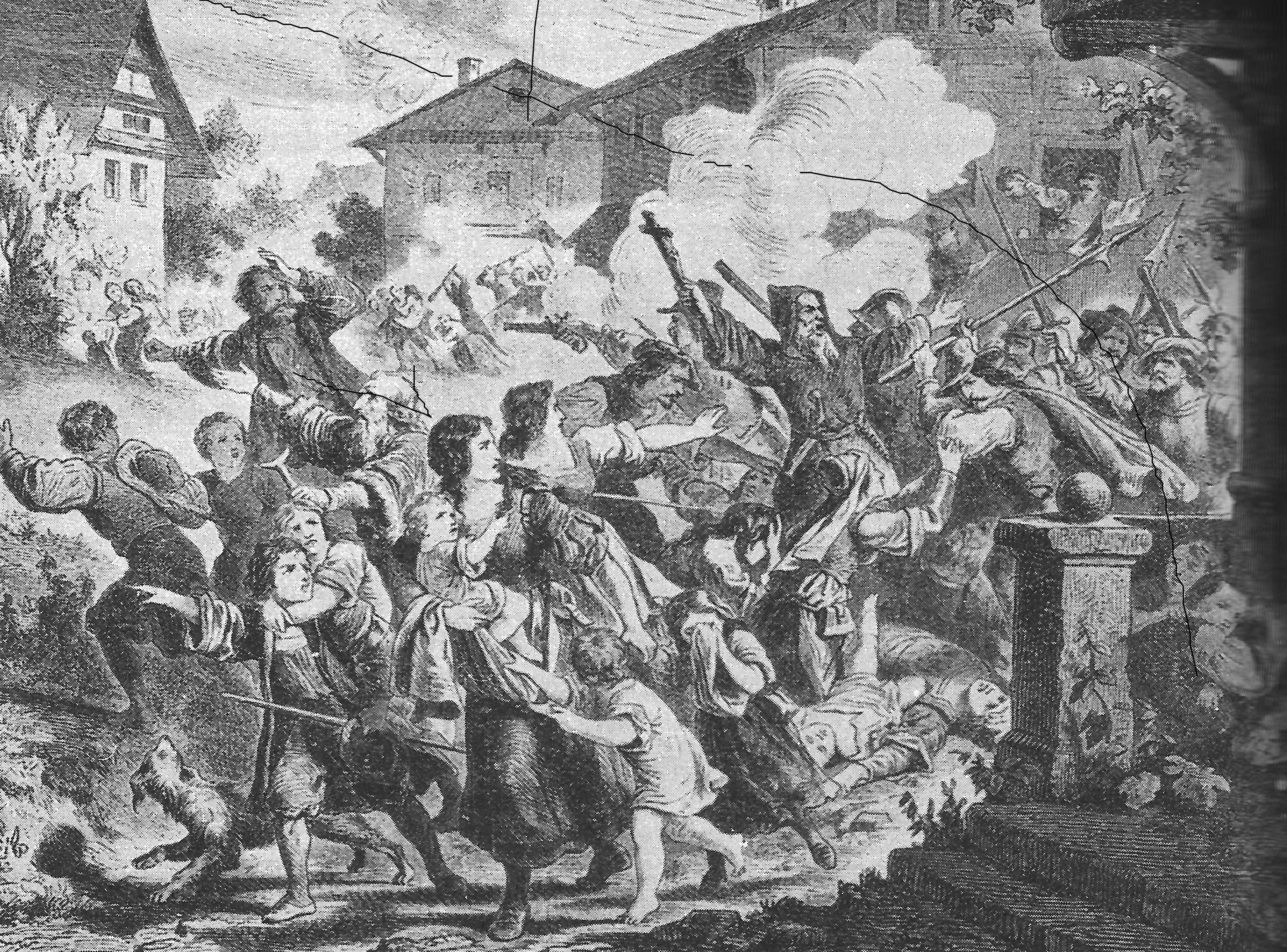
Date	July 1620 – 5 March 1626
Location	Valtellina
Result	Treaty of Monzón

Belligerents
France; The Three Leagues; Venice; Savoy	(Spain) Spanish Empire; Holy Roman Empire (Republic of Genoa) Genoa; Papal States; Grisons rebels

Commanders and leaders
(Kingdom of France) Antoine d'Estrées (Kingdom of France) François Annibal d'Estrées	(Spain) Duke of Feria (Papal States) Torquato Conti

The Valtellina War (1620–1626) was an episode of the Thirty Years' War arising out of competition to control the Valtelline, an Alpine valley forming a key part of the Spanish Road.

== Background ==
Valtelline, in Northern Italy, was vitally important to the communications between the Spanish and Austrian branches of the House of Habsburg through the Spanish Road. The Sforzas had ceded the territory to the Grison League, but there were religious conflicts because Valtelline natives were Catholic and the Grison were Protestant. Seeing an opportunity, the Spanish incited a revolt in Valtelline and eventually controlled the valley. Realizing the danger, in 1623, Venice, the Duke of Savoy, and France formed an alliance to capture this strategic position by signing the Treaty of Paris (1623). Spain tried to maintain peace by allowing the Papacy, over which they had great influence, to control the area. France did nothing as the Papal troops of Gregory XV established control over Valtelline due to the lackluster policies of Charles de La Vieuville. Gregory XV was soon afterwards succeeded by Pope Urban VIII.

== Course of war ==
With the ascendancy of Cardinal Richelieu, French policy changed. Richelieu had no difficulty in persuading Louis XIII that if Spain gained control of the Valtellina valleys, it would unite them with possessions of the house of Austria, doubling the power of this house, and remove the only obstacle to its universal domination, exposing the independence of all of Europe, "shackling Christendom, making the Pope the chaplain of the Habsburgs", and excluding France from Italian affairs.

They claimed that because their ally the Duke of Savoy was attacking Genoa, by attacking Valtelline they diverted the resources of the Spanish, who were supporters of Genoa. The French had no difficulty winning over Swiss Protestants who were happy to see the French support their co-religionists in Valtellina. On November 24, 1624, 5000-6000 French troops under François Annibal d'Estrées entered Valtellina through Poschiavo. French troops quickly expelled Papal troops from the valley. The irony of a Cardinal attacking the troops of a Pope was not lost on Rome, Spain, and ultra-Catholics in France.

In March 1625, François de Bonne de Lesdiguières linked up with the Duke of Savoy and defeated Genoese and Spanish forces, driving them out of some of their positions. The Pope could not afford to lose the crucial forts in the Valtellina and began to organise a force of 6,000 men to retake the valley.

== Result and Historical Assessment ==
Urban VIII sent Cardinal Francesco Barberini, who was his nephew, as legate to Paris to seek peace in 1625; he was also authorized by Spain. Due to a rebellion in France, this gave Richelieu the excuse to begin to negotiate terms.

In Spring news that a treaty between Spain and France, called the treaty of Monzon, had been secretly negotiated in Madrid was revealed. The manner of the treaty and not the content of the treaty caused anger among France's allies (Savoy and Venice), who were not included in the negotiations.

The Treaty of Monzon, granted the Valtelline self-rule guaranteed by the Papacy, Spain, and France, with Spain and France having de facto right of passage. With both France and Spain having equal rights to the passes. The Grisons and Valtelline Protestants received nothing.

The treaty, mediated by the Papal States, resulted in Valtellina being remained under Grison control with significant Catholic autonomy, this caused doubt who could transit through the valley. French forces in the Valtellina's forts were replaced by Papal ones and, although the forts were supposed to be destroyed, they were not. Savoy was obliged to make its own peace and now sought a Spanish alliance..

Richelieu wrote in his memoirs that he had 'made Spanish pride bend' and restored liberty to the passes.. Early historians agreed with this ascertion, Jules Michelet wrote 'France, master of the Valtellina by arms dictated the peace of Monzon to Spain.' with Grison historian Conrad Meyer Von Knonau also writing 'France forced Spain and the Three Leagues to accept a solution serving its own interest. Some Modern assessments also similarly state The Treaty of Monzon was 'negotiated under French initiative and pressure.' forcing Spain to recognize France's right to intervene in Italy.

However, other historians disagree with this ascertion, and suggest the treaty was more favourable to Spain. Wilson writes 'Monzon represented a serious reversal for Richelieu' and that 'Spain had won the first round.'

Others provide a more balanced viewpoint, that Monzon was a strategic stalemate and that it was a religious victory for Catholicism but a political compromise.

== Bibliography ==
- Acton, Baron John Emerich Edward Dalberg; Ward, Sir Adolphus William; Prothero, George Walter; Benians, Ernest Alfred (1911), The Cambridge Modern History, vol. 4, New York: Macmillan
- Dyer, Thomas Henry (1877). Modern Europe : From the fall of Constantinople to the establishment of the German Empire, A.D. 1453-1871. Vol. 3. From 1593 to 1721. London: Bell. OCLC 633452861.
- Ewart, Katharine Dorothea (1909). Italy from 1494 to 1790. Cambridge: University Press. OCLC 2285811.
- Wilson, Peter H. (2010). Europe's Tragedy: A History of the Thirty Years War. Penguin UK. ISBN 978-0141006147.
