= Musso War =

War between Three Leagues and Duchy of Milan (1524–6, 1531-2)

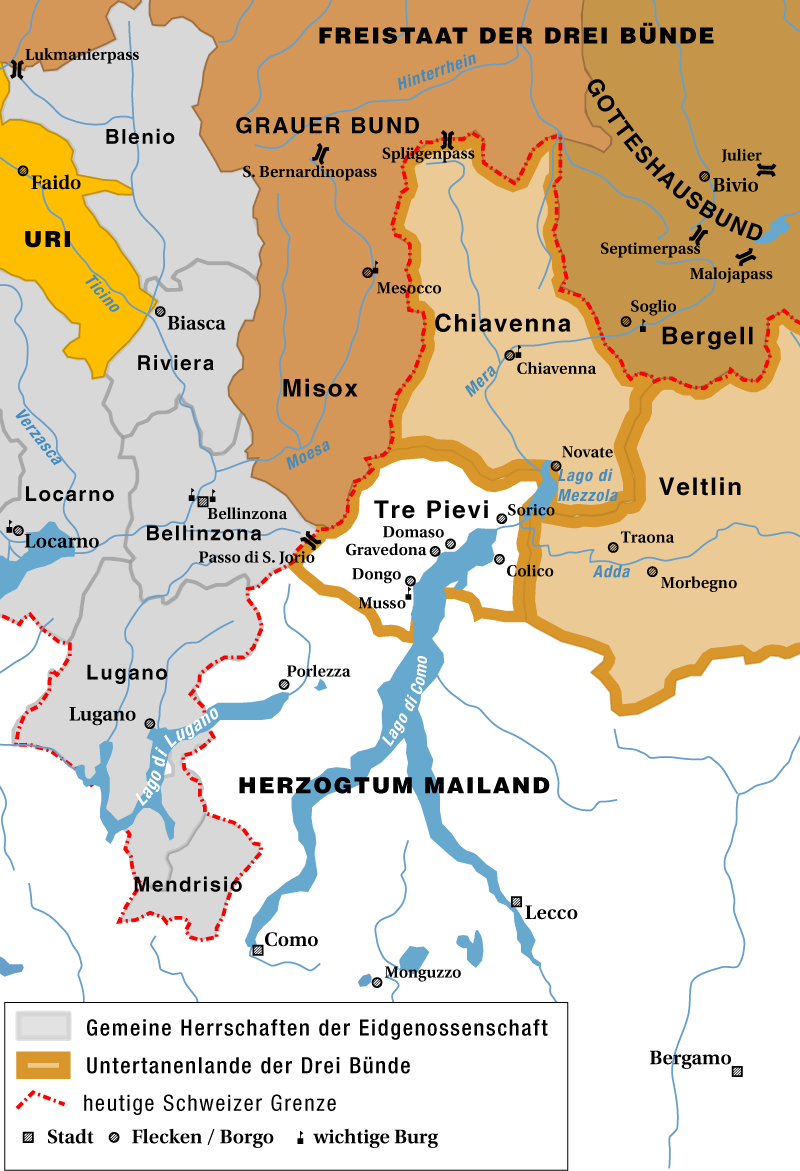
Map of the Musso War

The Musso War (or War of Musso) was an armed conflict between the federation of the Three Leagues (German: Drei Bünde), which functioned as an associate state of the Old Swiss Confederacy, and Gian Giacomo Medici (castellan of Musso, on Lake Como) early in the 16th century. The conflict took place in two phases: the First Musso War (1524–26) during which Medici, serving the Duchy of Milan, fought against the Three Leagues; and the Second Musso War (1531–32) during which Medici, acting as an independent warlord, fought against both the Swiss and Milanese.

== First war ==
The Milanese reeve of Como, Gian Giacomo Medici, who resided in the castle at Musso, had been raiding the valley of Chiavenna since 1521. In 1524, in alliance with the Prince-Bishopric of Chur, he attempted to conquer the Three Leagues. In 1525 his forces were defeated at the Battle of Morbegno but he remained in control of Chiavenna. Following the battle, the Three Leagues sent a delegation headed by Gian Travers to negotiate a peace treaty with the city of Milan. However, while en route they were captured and imprisoned by Medici in September 1525. Due to religious conflicts following the Reformation, neither the Swiss Confederation nor the Three Leagues were able to move quickly to free the prisoners. In the spring of 1526 a Three Leagues delegation, with the support of France and Venice, were finally able to secure the release of the prisoners, but only after paying a ransom and giving the Tre Pievi or three communes at the north end of Lake Como to Medici.

In 1527, Gian Travers wrote an epic account of the war in Romansh verse, Chanzun da la guerra dalg Chiastè d'Müs ("Song of the War of the Castle of Musso").

== Second war ==
In 1531 Musso acted as an independent warlord and waged war on both Milan and the Swiss. He attacked again, capturing Morbegno and defeating the League forces in the area. The Three Leagues called the Old Swiss Confederacy for help, calling in duties of a defence alliance concluded earlier. Due to the religious conflicts in the Confederation only the Protestant cantons supported the Three Leagues, while the Catholic cantons insisted that any help was dependent on the Leagues converting back to the old faith. The Protestant and League forces were able to drive Musso's forces out of the Valtellina. Medici lost Morbegno and Monguzzo, but defended himself successfully in the sieges of Lecco and Musso. A compromise established the return to the Duke of Milan of all the territories owned by Gian Giacomo Medici (Musso, Lecco, Tre Pievi) in exchange for his investiture as Marquis of Marignano and 35,000 scudi per year. Chiavenna and the Valtellina were granted to the Three Leagues.

The refusal of the Catholic cantons to support the Three Leagues in these skirmishes was taken by the Swiss canton of Zürich as the reason to start the Second War of Kappel. The Catholic cantons would emerge victorious from that war and even gain the majority in the confederacy's federal assembly, the Tagsatzung, with far-reaching consequences for the confederacy.

== See also ==
- History of the Grisons
- Reformation in Switzerland
- Wars of Kappel
