= Philip Vernon =

Philip Vernon may refer to:

- Philip E. Vernon (1905–1987), British psychologist and intelligence researcher
- Philip A. Vernon (born 1950), psychologist and intelligence researcher, son of Philip E. Vernon
- Philip Vernon, a character in the 1972 Italian film Who Saw Her Die?

== See also ==
- Philip (disambiguation)
- Vernon (disambiguation)
