= Magdalen Dorothea Vernon =

British experimental psychologist

- Born: 25 June 1901; Oxford, England
- Died: 1 December 1991 (aged 90); Beckenham, England
- Education: University of Cambridge
- Occupation: Experimental psychologist
- Employer: University of Reading
- Parents: Horace Middleton Vernon (father); Katharine Dorothea Ewart (mother)

Magdalen Dorothea Vernon (25 June 1901 – 1 December 1991) was a British experimental psychologist who published her research widely and trained many PhD students. She was the first woman to head the then Department of Psychology at the University of Reading, England.

== Life and work ==
Maggie (as she was known) and her brother Philip, were born in Oxford to Katharine Dorothea Ewart and Horace Middleton Vernon. She was named after Magdalen College, the Oxford college where her father was a Fellow. She and her brother both pursued studies in psychology following in the footsteps of their father, an industrial psychologist. She attended Oxford High School and then enrolled in Newnham College, Cambridge on a scholarship, earning her MA in 1926 and Sc.D in 1953.

After graduating with a bachelor's degree, she took a position on the Industrial Health Research Board as an assistant investigator but after three years there, she joined Frederic Bartlett's experimental research group in the Cambridge Psychological Laboratory, where she worked from 1927 to 1946. There, she researched visual perception by studying eye movements when subjects were proofreading.

With her published findings in 1931, Vernon became known as an international expert on reading. Her following book on the subject was widely read and she worked with Scottish psychologist Kenneth Craik as well, which resulted in joint papers on dark adaptation.

=== University of Reading ===
In 1946, she took a lecturer position at the University of Reading. According to an obituary by Davis, "Her presence greatly enhanced the reputation of the department and it is remarkable how many eminent psychologists took their PhDs under Magdalen Vernon's supervision".

She later became head of department, the first woman in that position. Throughout her career, she continued to promote experimental psychology and in 1946 was one of a dozen scholars to found the Experimental Psychology Society and subsequently she became its president. She was promoted to university professor in 1956.

Throughout her life, she substantially influenced "an important group of psychologists".

Heavily influenced by her former professor, Bartlett, she extended his ideas of "effort after meaning", a term indicating the complex schemata used by the individual in perception of material.

Although she retired in 1967, she continued to write and published a book on human motivation in 1969. When she was 70, she published her last book, which examined reading difficulties.

Since then, the Department of Psychology at the University of Reading have established named-doctorate studentships in her honour.

== Death ==
Magdalen Vernon, died at the age of 90 in Beckenham, England on 1 December 1991.

== Distinctions ==
- 1952-1954 – President, Experimental Psychology Society
- 1958-59 – President, British Psychological Society
- 1970 – Honorary Fellowship, British Psychological Society

== Selected works ==
She published many influential books on reading and visual perception.

- Vernon, M.D. (1931). The Experimental Study of Reading.
- Vernon, M.D. (1937). Visual Perception.
- Vernon, M.D. (1958). Backwardness in Reading.
- Vernon, M.D. (1965). Psychology of Perception.
- Vernon, M.D. (1969). Human Motivation.
- Vernon, M.D. (1971). Readings and its Difficulties.
