= Spanish Road =

16th century international military road

Map of the Spanish Road. Brown arrows are the major routes passing through the Franche-Comté; blue arrows are the alternative routes alongside the Rhine. Territories of Habsburg Spain in orange; Imperial territories including Franche-Comté and Spanish Netherlands, in purple.

The Spanish Road (Note: Spanish: Camino Español, German, Spanische Straße, also known as the Road of the Spaniards (Camino de los Españoles), Road of the Spanish Tercios (Camino de los Tercios Españoles), or Sardinian Corridor (Corredor Sardo) in Spanish.) was a military road and trade route linking Spanish territories in Flanders with those in Italy. It was in use from approximately 1567 to 1648.

The Road was created to support the Spanish war effort in the Eighty Years' War against the Dutch Republic. Although sending reinforcements by sea directly from Spain was much quicker, Spanish vessels sailing up the English Channel were subject to attacks by the increasingly dominant Dutch navy. It was therefore safer to assemble troops and supplies in Northern Italy, then march them overland along the 1,000 km (620 mi) length of the Road.

Between 1567 and 1620, over 123,000 men were transferred using this overland route, compared to only 17,600 by sea. The Road was eventually severed when France joined the Thirty Years' War in 1635 on the Dutch side.

== Background ==
By 1550, conflict within the Holy Roman Empire and Italy had stretched Spain's finances thin, requiring new taxes on the wealthy provinces of the Spanish Netherlands. The resentment this caused was compounded by a poor harvest in 1565, leading to famine in 1566, sometimes known as the 'Year of Hunger', or 'Year of Wonders'. Social, political and religious unrest climaxed with the Compromise of Nobles and the Beeldenstorm, threatening the government of Margaret of Parma, Philip's Regent in Brussels. Spanish troops under the Duke of Alba were dispatched to restore order and punish the perceived insurrectionists, triggering the Dutch Revolt and broader Eighty Years' War. As the Dutch rebels controlled the sea lanes, the government in Madrid was forced to find an alternative way to move troops from Lombardy to the Spanish Netherlands. Initially surveyed in 1566, the Spanish Road was first used by Alba in July 1567.

== History ==
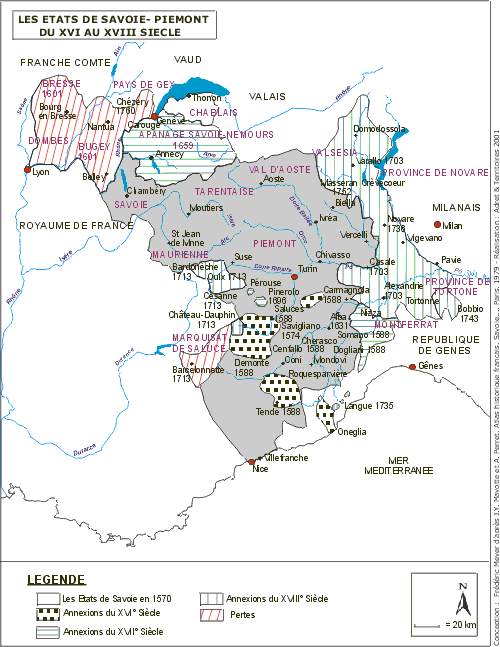
Savoy, 1500–1800. Bugey and Bresse are the red shaded areas in the top-left.

=== 1567–1601: Savoyard route ===
The initial route of the Spanish Road ran northwest from Milan through the Duchy of Savoy, a Spanish ally, to the Spanish Franche-Comté, and from there due north through the Duchy of Lorraine, another Spanish ally, to Luxembourg in the Spanish Netherlands. This was the path along which Alba's forces marched in 1567, and Spanish forces continued to use it without significant interruption for the next thirty years.

However, following defeat in the Franco-Savoyard War (1600–1601), the Treaty of Lyon (1601) forced Savoy to cede its two northernmost provinces, Bugey and Bresse, to France. This meant significant parts of the Road were now controlled by a hostile party, blocking Spanish troop movements using this route. Seeking an alternative path, they backed an attempt by Savoy in December 1602 to conquer Geneva, which bordered Savoy and Franche-Comté. This would have enabled Spanish troops to bypass French territories, but the attack failed, a victory still celebrated in the annual l'Escalade festival.

=== 1601–1609: Swiss and Valtellinese routes ===
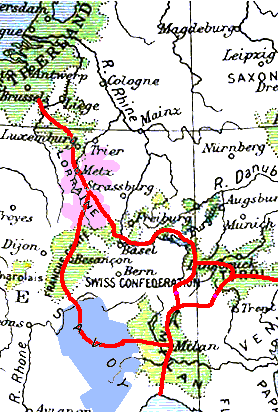
The Duchy of Milan–Spanish Netherlands part of the Spanish Road. Marked on this map are the Savoyard and Valtellinese variants of the route.

The Spanish now sought an alternative route, the most straightforward running due north from Milan through the Gotthard Pass, then down through Central Switzerland to the High Rhine. Crossing the Rhine would bring the Spanish armies into Further Austria, held by the Austrian Habsburgs, cousins and close allies of Spain. From here, troops could march through friendly territory in Upper Alsace and Lorraine, then on to the Spanish Netherlands. In principle, the Swiss Confederacy was willing to allow the Spanish free passage, but the fact they were being sent to fight against Dutch Protestants caused considerable disquiet in the Protestant cantons and threatened to trigger another civil war. The Confederacy therefore imposed various conditions, for example obliging Spanish soldiers to march in unarmed groups of no more than two hundred men at a time. These made it difficult to move forces efficiently, and only six major expeditions used this route before it was abandoned.

The alternative was to march northeast from Milan through the Valtellina, the southernmost territory of the Three Leagues. The Valtellina allowed Spanish troops to enter the Austrian-held County of Tyrol via the Stelvio Pass, before proceeding through Alsace and Lorraine as above. As early as 1592, the Count of Fuentes, Spanish Governor of Milan, negotiated a deal to use this route. However, like the Swiss, the Three Leagues contained Catholic and Protestant districts, the latter objecting to the Spanish presence for the same reasons. In addition, factions backed by France and Venice persuaded the Leagues to grant them exclusive access to the Valtellina in 1603, thereby nullifying the 1592 agreement with Fuentes. In a bid to intimidate the Leagues, the Spanish constructed Fort Fuentes on the Milanese-Valtellinese border, but to little effect.

By 1610, all three variants of the Road had become largely impassable to Spanish troops. However, in 1609 the Twelve Years' Truce came into effect, suspending the Eighty Years' War, and temporarily removing the need for a steady stream of reinforcements to the Army of Flanders.

=== 1619–1635: Reopened Valtellinese route ===
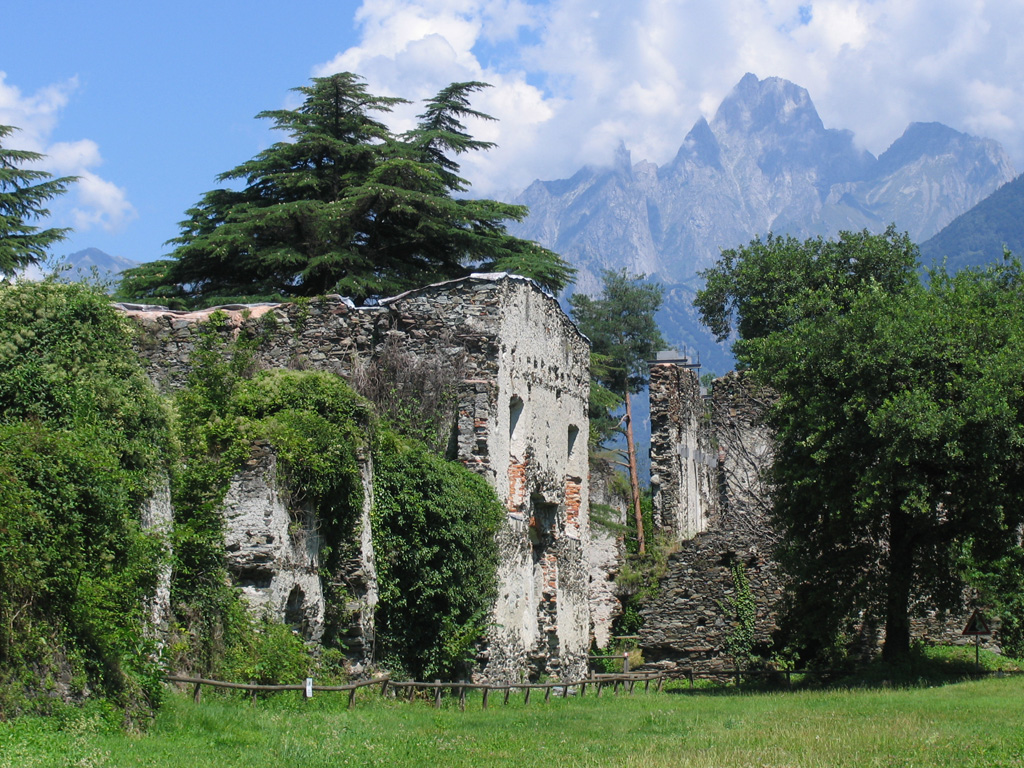
Fort Fuentes, built by the Spanish to intimidate the Three Leagues into reopening the eastern route through the Valtellina.

The Twelve Years' Truce broke down in 1619 (two years ahead of its projected expiry date), and Spain therefore found itself obliged to start sending large armies to the Low Countries again. It therefore became imperative to find a way of reopening the Spanish Road as soon as possible.

The Duke of Feria, Fuentes's successor as Governor of Milan, therefore instigated a Catholic insurrection in the Three Leagues, sparking a religious civil war, the Bündner Wirren (Graubünden Disturbances), within the federation. While the Leagues fought among themselves he then invaded the Valtellina in a bid to annex the territory outright and thereby reopen the Spanish Road via Tyrol. This alarmed France, which sent an expeditionary force to the Valtellina under the command of the famed mountain warfare specialist Lesdiguières. The resulting Valtellina War ended in stalemate, and under the 1626 Treaty of Monzón, Spain was forced to return the Valtellina. However, the route through the Stelvio Pass was reopened, enabling troop movements along the Spanish Road to resume.

Multiple Spanish armies travelled along the reopened Road during the late 1620s and early 1630s, some to the traditional battlefield in the Low Countries but others to Germany, where the Thirty Years' War was now raging, in order to support the beleaguered Austrian Habsburgs. They included that of Cardinal-Infante Ferdinand, which won a series of important victories in Germany including the First Battle of Nördlingen.

=== 1635–1648: End of the Road ===
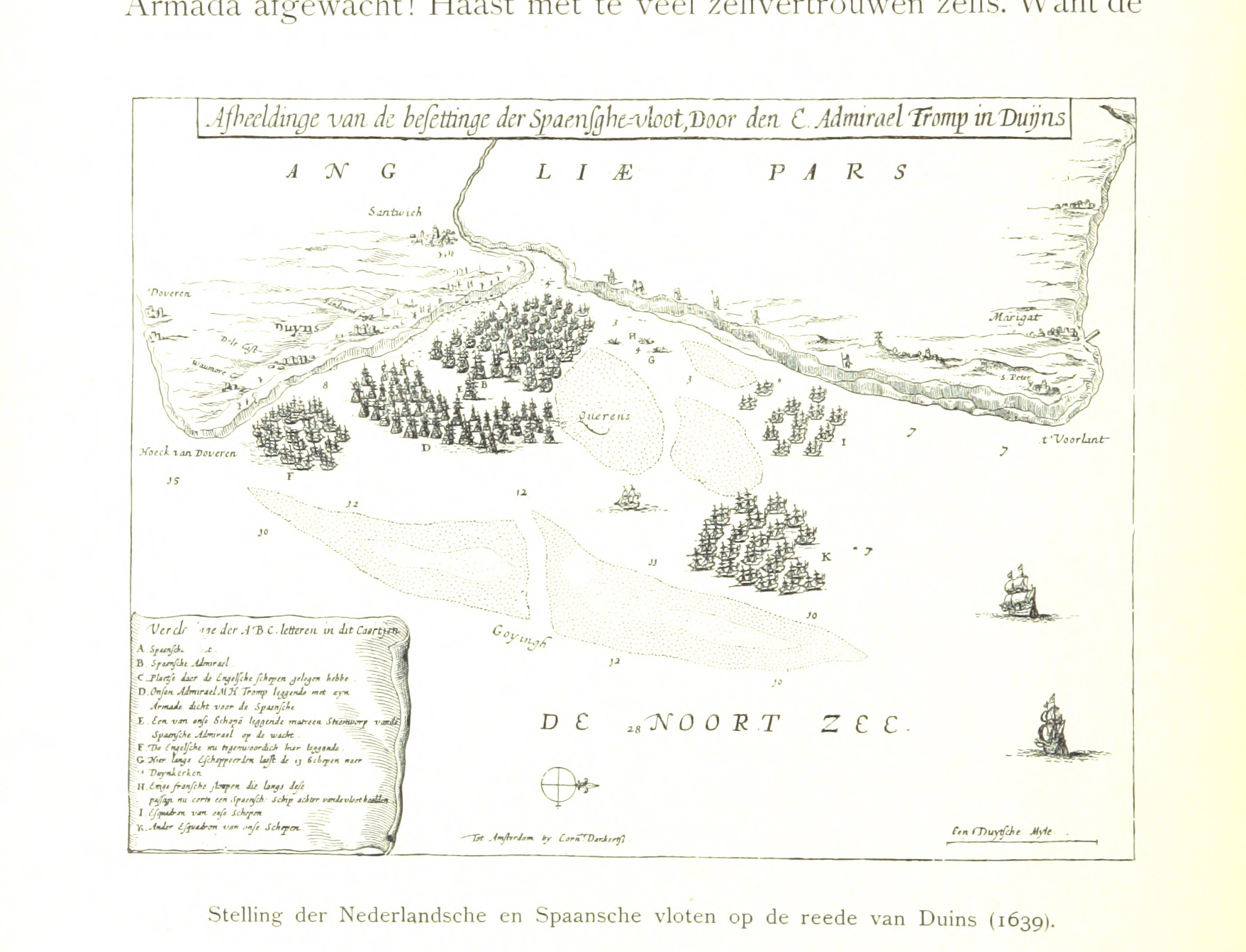
The Battle of the Downs. The closure of the Spanish Road obliged Spain to send reinforcements to the Low Countries by sea instead.

The Habsburg victories in Germany alarmed the French chief minister Cardinal Richelieu, who in 1635 brought France into the Thirty Years' War against Austria and also declared war on Spain. In the late 1630s Henri de Rohan mounted a second French expedition into the Valtellina, hampering Spanish troop movements through the valley, while other French forces invaded Alsace, which was annexed after the Siege of Breisach. The Road was thereby cut at two points, in the south between Milan and Tyrol, and in the north between Further Austria and Lorraine.

With the Spanish Road closed off, the Spanish were forced to start transporting their armies to the Low Countries by sea instead. In 1639 one of these convoys was attacked off the English coast by the Dutch admiral Maarten Tromp, leading to the Battle of the Downs in which Tromp annihilated the Spanish fleet that had been escorting the troop ships. This catastrophic defeat crippled Spanish naval power, making it all but impossible for Spain to get reinforcements and supplies to the Army of Flanders, and this strategic catastrophe was instrumental in finally bringing about an end to the Eighty Years' War with the Peace of Münster.

== Logistics ==
There was no organised system of accommodation for the troops marching along the Spanish Road. Officers would sometimes be able to stay in towns along the route, but their men had to sleep under bushes or construct makeshift huts for themselves at the end of a day's march. Local people were generally fearful of the soldiers that passed through because of the reputation that all armies of this period had for plunder and thievery even when in friendly territory. In 1580, the officers of a Spanish tercio occupied a house in Franche-Comté only to find there was no furniture inside, as the occupants of the house had removed it all to preclude the possibility of its being vandalised, burned or stolen.

Armies only marched along the Spanish Road once or twice a year at most, and because of this no conventional military magazines were established along the route.There was however a system of étapes for provisioning troops at particular points, using commissioners sent by the Governors of the Spanish Netherlands or Milan to work out pricing details. The first type of étape was found only in Savoy, and took the form of a permanent waystation where soldiers and merchant travellers along the Road had access to food and shelter when they passed through. The second type, found in Franche-Comté, Lorraine and the Spanish Netherlands, was organised on an ad hoc basis through private contractors, who would calculate the payments and quantities of food required based on the expected size and schedule of each individual expedition.

== Effects ==
Although the Spanish Road initially had a purely military function, it also became an important trade route linking the Mediterranean to Northern Europe, similar to the mediaeval Via Imperii. The Road also prompted the Spanish to strengthen their diplomatic contacts in the Alpine region, leading to the establishment of permanent embassies in Savoy and the Swiss Confederacy that were supervised from Milan.

One unintended consequence of the Spanish Road was the circulation of the plague by soldiers and merchants travelling along it, notably in Valtellina in the wake of the Valtellina War.

== Recorded expeditions, 1567–1593 ==
Recorded expeditions between 1567 & 1593
Year	Chief	Soldiers	Start	Arrival	Days
1567	Alba	10,000	20/06	15/08	56
1573	Acuña	5,000	04/05	15/06	42
1578	Figueroa	5,000	22/02	27/03	32
1578	Serbelloni	3,000	02/06	22/07	50
1582	Paz	6,000	21/06	30/07	40
1582	Carduini	5,000	24/07	27/08	34
1584	Passi	5,000	26/04	18/06	54
1585	Bobadilla	2,000	18/06	29/08	42
1587	Zúñiga	3,000	13/09	01/11	49
1587	Queralt	2,000	07/10	07/12	60
1591	Toledo	3,000	01/08	26/09	57
1593	Mèxic	3,000	02/11	31/12	60

== See also ==
- Blue Banana
- Burgundian Circle
- Eighty Years' War
- History of Burgundy
- Kingdom of Burgundy
- Middle Francia
- Oñate treaty
- Thirty Years' War
- Treaty of Lyon (1601)
- Treaty of Monzón
- Valtellina War
- Ho Chi Minh trail

== Sources ==
- Cecil John Cadoux (1969). Philip of Spain and the Netherlands. Hamden, Conn.: Archon Books. pp. 64–67.
- Ciro Paoletti (2007). A military history of Italy. Westport Conn.: Greenwood Praeger.
- Gaunt, William (1969). Flemish Cities: Their History and Art. Elek Books. ISBN 978-1122408936.
- Parker, Geoffrey (2004). The Army of Flanders and the Spanish Road 1567–1659: The Logistics of Spanish Victory and Defeat in the Low Countries' Wars (2008 ed.). Cambridge University Press. ISBN 978-0521543927.
- Wee, Herman van der (1994). The Low Countries in the Early Modern World. Translated by Fackelman, Elizabeth. Variorum. ISBN 978-0860783848.
- Wilson, Peter H. (2009). The Thirty Years' War: Europe's Tragedy. Harvard University Press. ISBN 978-0-674-03634-5.
