= Rock Engraving Park of Grosio =

Rock Engraving Park-Grosio
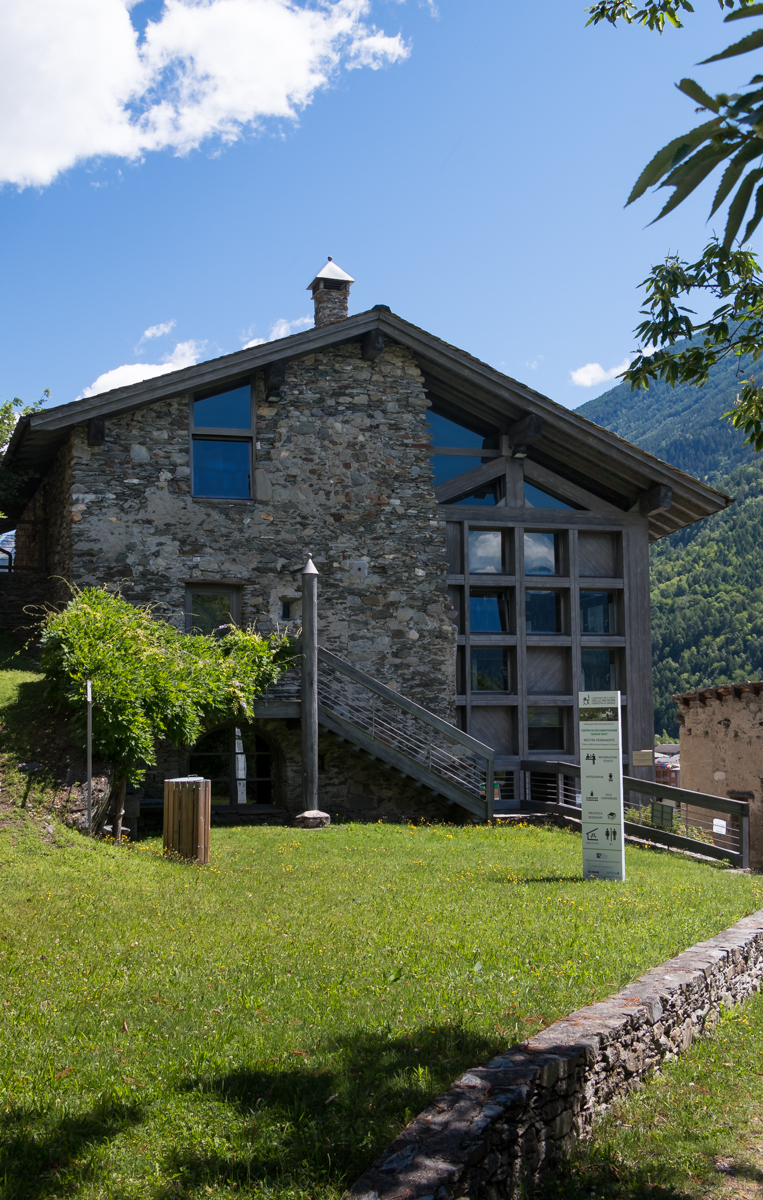
- Established: 1978
- Location: Via San Faustino, Grosio, Italy
- Coordinates: 46°17′30″N 10°15′50″E
- Website: http://www.parcoincisionigrosio.it

The Rock Engraving Park (Italian: Parco Incisioni Rupestri) is an archaeological park situated in Grosio and Grosotto, two villages in the valley Valtellina in Lombardy, northern Italy. The park was founded in 1978 to conserve, study and develop the cultural heritage on the Dosso dei Castelli (Castle Hill).

== Introduction ==
The Castle Hill displays a combination of the historical, archaeological, architectural and even landscape patrimony of various ages of the Valtellina. The hill is dominated by two castles. The Castello Vecchio (Old Castle) from the 10th–11th century and the Castello Nuovo (New Castle), which was constructed in the 14th century. Of high standard is even the traditional system of dry-stone terraces surrounding the hill. Special and unique is the Rupe Magna, a large rock which contains more than 5,000 engraved figures from the 4th to the 1st millennium BC.

== Rupe Magna ==
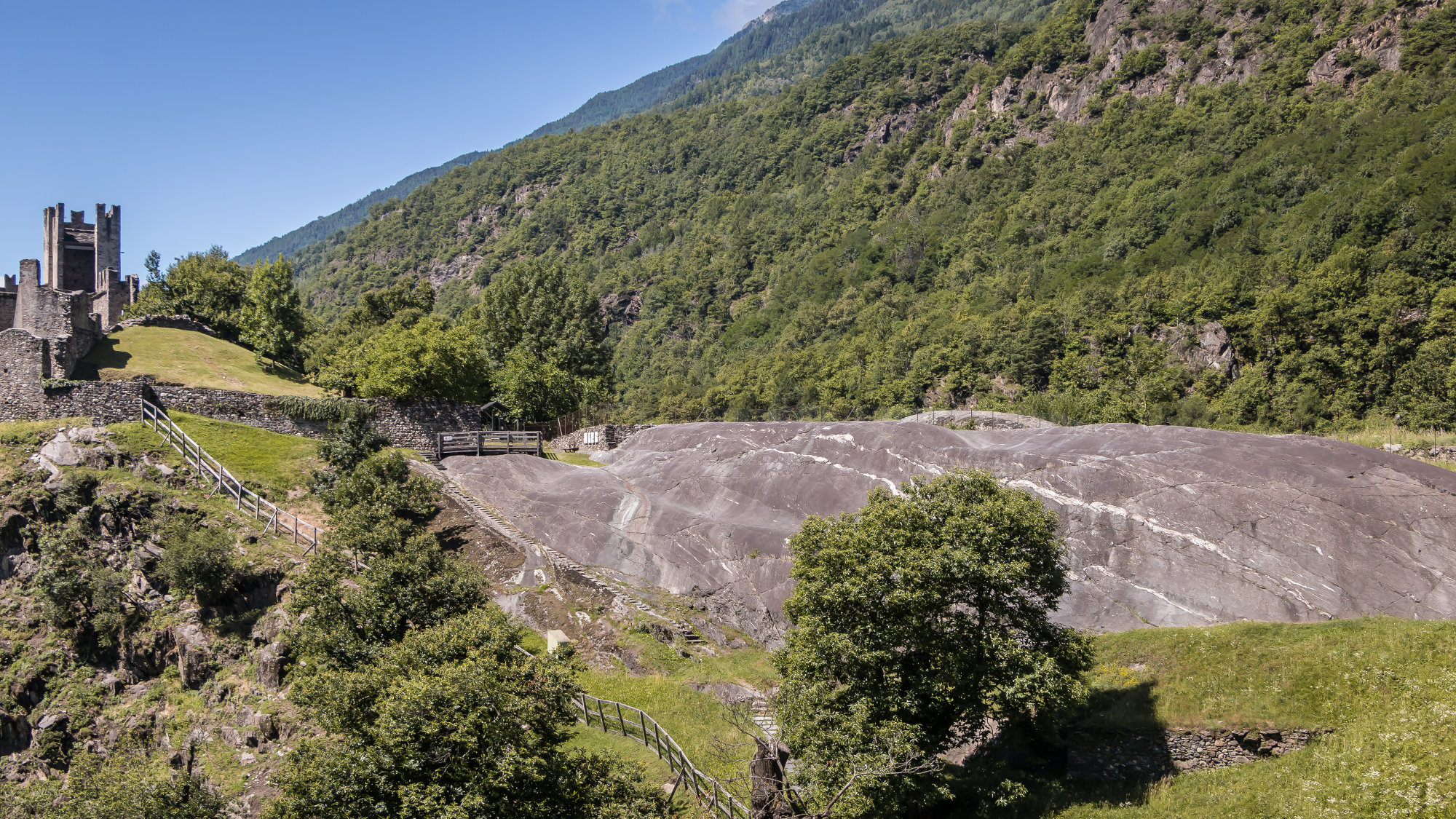
Rupe Magna.

Rock engravings (Petroglyphs) are documented in several different locations in the Valtellina, but the most important ones can be found in the Rock Engraving Park of Grosio on the surface of the Rupe Magna. In the year 1966, the Italian Archaeologist Davide Pace found traces of rock engravings. During the following years, he made an initial record of the petroglyphs of the Rupe Magna as well as those found on the nearby Dosso Giroldo. The Rupe Magna then became the object of a research project between 1991 and 1995. During these scientific studies, more than 5,000 petroglyphs were located and documented. The Rupe Magna, with a length of 84 m and a width of 35 , is one of the biggest engraved rocks in the Alpine range.

The Rupe Magna owes its shape to the action of the Valtellina glacier. The slow, continual movement of the tongues of ice that occupied the valleys of the Adda and the Roasco molded the surface into its characteristic form. The Rupe Magna is made of dark grey phyllite with quartzite lenses. Numerous themes like human figures, including “orants”, armed men and wrestlers, animals, geometrical shapes, cup-marks, rakes and crosses are represented on the surface of the Rupe Magna. Based on comparison with objects from archaeological excavations and stylistic considerations, they may be dated from the Neolithic Period (4th millennium BC) to the Iron Age (1st millennium BC).

Archaeological excavations in 1995 could prove the existence of prehistoric settlements on the Dosso dei Castelli beginning from the Bronze Age (16th – 14th century BC) up to the Iron Age, precisely to the 1st century BC.

== Castello Vecchio ==
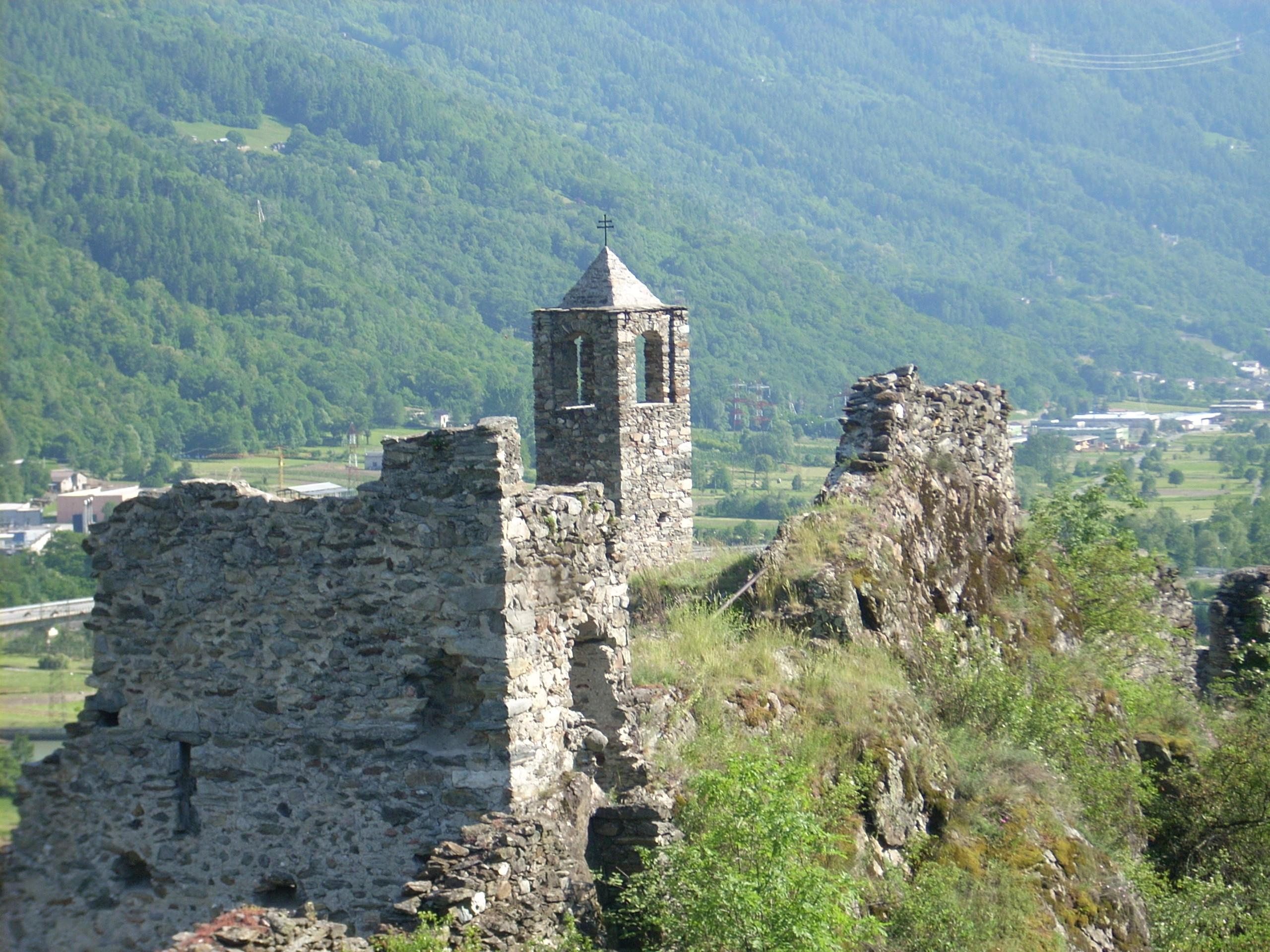
Castello Vecchio, view from North-East.

The so-called Castello Vecchio (Old Castle) was mentioned for the first time in a written document in the year 1150 as „Castrum Groxi“, but archaeological results indicate a construction date already at about the end of the 10th century.

The preserved walls of the Castello Vecchio show the historic size of the whole structure. The nowadays dominating church spire from the Romanesque Period was partly restructured at the end of the 19th century. The first construction phase of the corresponding small church is dated by archaeological results to the 7th or 8th century. Most probably built to cover the two medieval tombs, which are cut directly into the rock. The relatively limited size as well as the low fortification level indicate that the castle was more a symbol of the power of the feudatory than a fortress. The feudatories of this area of the Valtellina were at this age the bishops of Como. From about the 12th century onwards, their vassals in the region of Grosio were the lords von Matsch, a family that has its origins in the Vinschgau (it. Val Venosta). That's why the family in the Valtellina later on was called Venosta. According to documentary evidence the castle was inhabited until the last decades of the 16th century.

== Castello Nuovo ==
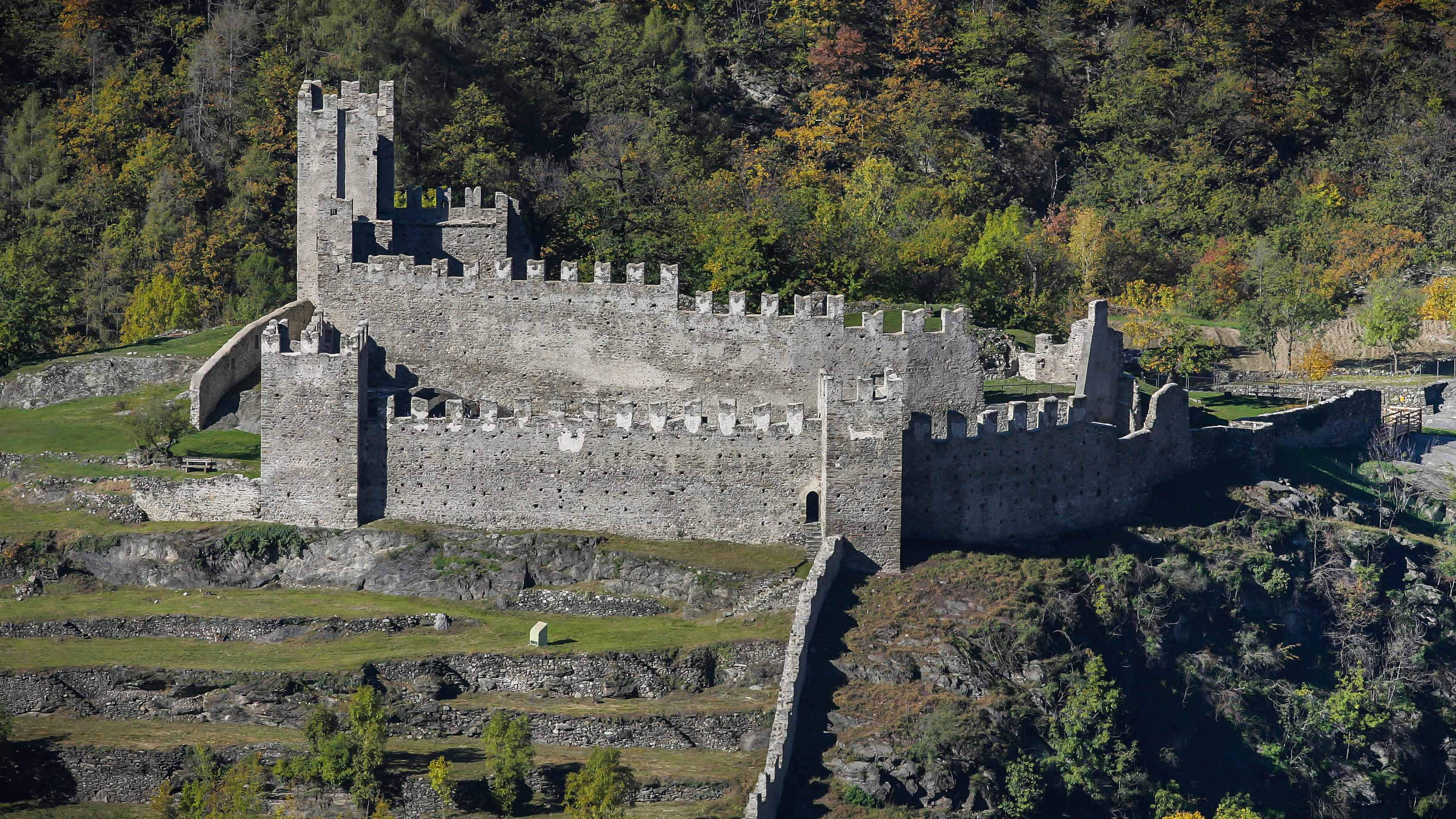
Castello Nuovo, view from south-east.

The New Castle, or Castello Nuovo, was constructed between 1350 and 1375 on the initiative of the House of Visconti. The Visconti family, already lords of Milan, in 1335 acquired also Valtellina after defeating the commune of Como.

The Castello Nuovo was designed as a stronghold, adapted to the strategic needs of the 14th century. It was surrounded by a double defensive wall, had a solid keep and a fortified internal tower (Bergfried) as an ultimate defense structure. The southern part of the castle is built directly on the steep of the Castle Hill, while the north end, in contrast, had a moat. The fortress was never involved into fighting action. As early as in 1526 the Castello Nuovo was partially demolished by the new lords of the Valtellina to avoid possibilities of any kind of insurrection. Some years before in 1512 the three counties Chiavenna, Valtellina and Bormio became part of the Three Leagues (the Grisons) with the status of a subordinated land.

== Cultural Landscape Heritage ==
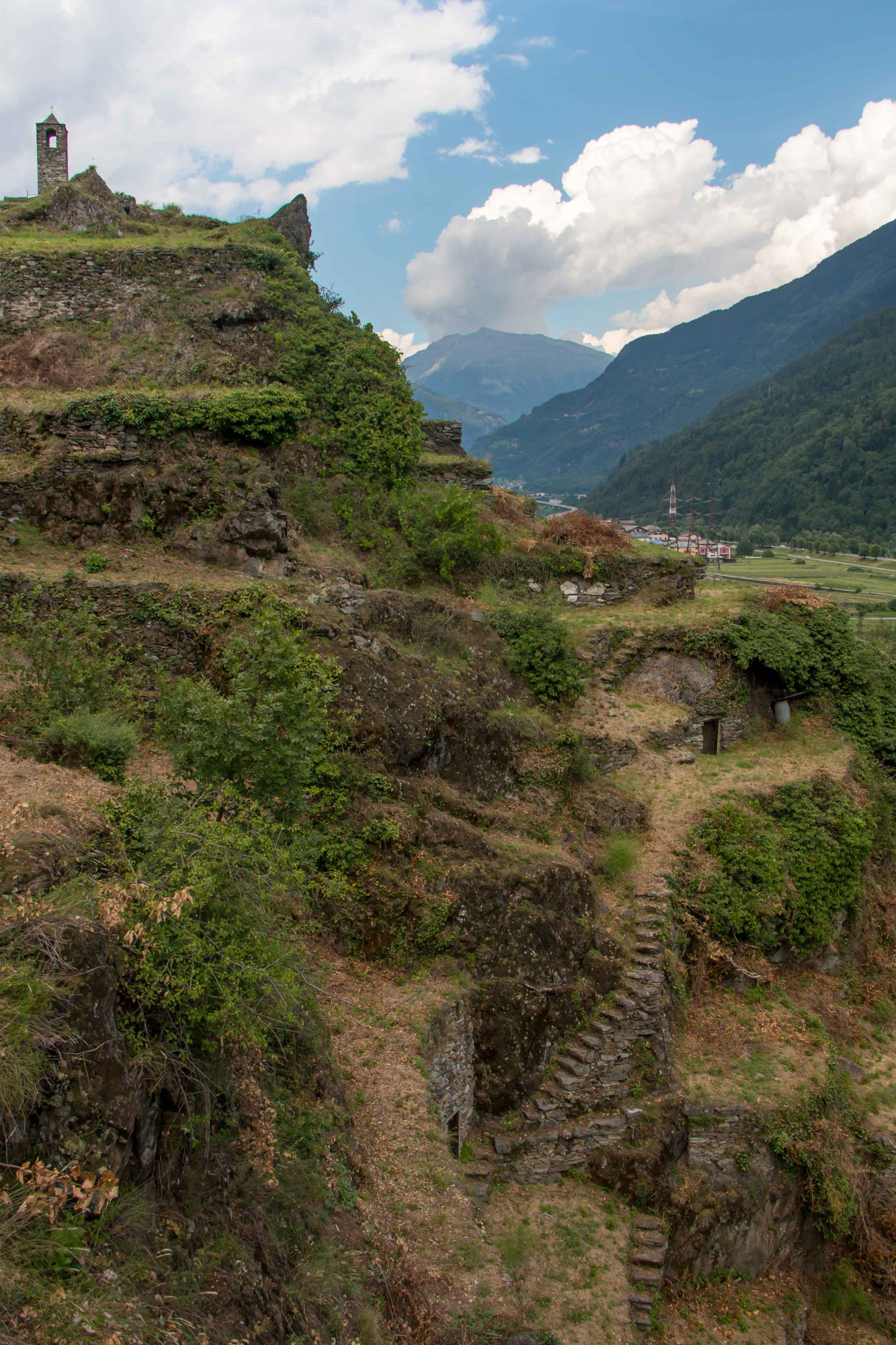
Dry-stone-wall terraces at the Dosso dei Castelli.

The slopes of the Dosso dei Castelli represent an example of the local tradition in Valtellina to build systems of dry-stonewall terraces for growing wine. The terraces of the Castle Hill of Grosio were most likely built after 1200.

Since 2013 the Fondazione Fojanini takes care about this major cultural landscape heritage. The terraces were cleaned of the wild vegetation with the aim to grow again wine on them. Grapes grown include Muscaris, Johanniter, Aromera, Bronner and Sauvigner Gris.

== Sources ==
- D. Pace, Petroglifi di Grosio (1972)
- D. Pace, Sviluppo dell’investigazione archeologica nel sistema petroglifico di Grosio (1974)
- D. Pace, Petroglifi dei colli di Grosio (1977)
- A. Arcà, A. Fossati, E. Marchi, E. Tognoni, "Rupe Magna. La roccia incisa più grande delle Alpi", in: Quaderni del Parco delle incisioni rupestri di Grosio 1 (1995)
- R. Poggiani Keller, "Grosio (So), Dosso dei Castelli e Dosso Giroldo. Un insediamento protostorico sotto i castelli e altri resti dell’età del Bronzo e del Ferro", in: Quaderni del Parco delle incisioni rupestri di Grosio 2 (1995)
- R. Poggiani Keller, "Atti del II convegno archeologico provinciale. Grosio 20 e 21 ottobre 1995", in: Quaderni del Parco delle incisioni rupestri di Grosio 3 (1999)
- C. Rodolfi, B.Ciapponi Landi, Il Parco delle incisioni rupestri di Grosio (n.d.)
- G. Antonioli, La storia dei castelli di Grosio nell’analisi delle fonti documentarie (2001)
- R. Poggiani Keller, C. Liborio, M.G. Ruggiero, Guida all’Antiquarium del Parco delle Incisioni Rupestri di Grosio (2008)
