= Tre Pievi =

Territory in Como, Lombardy, Italy

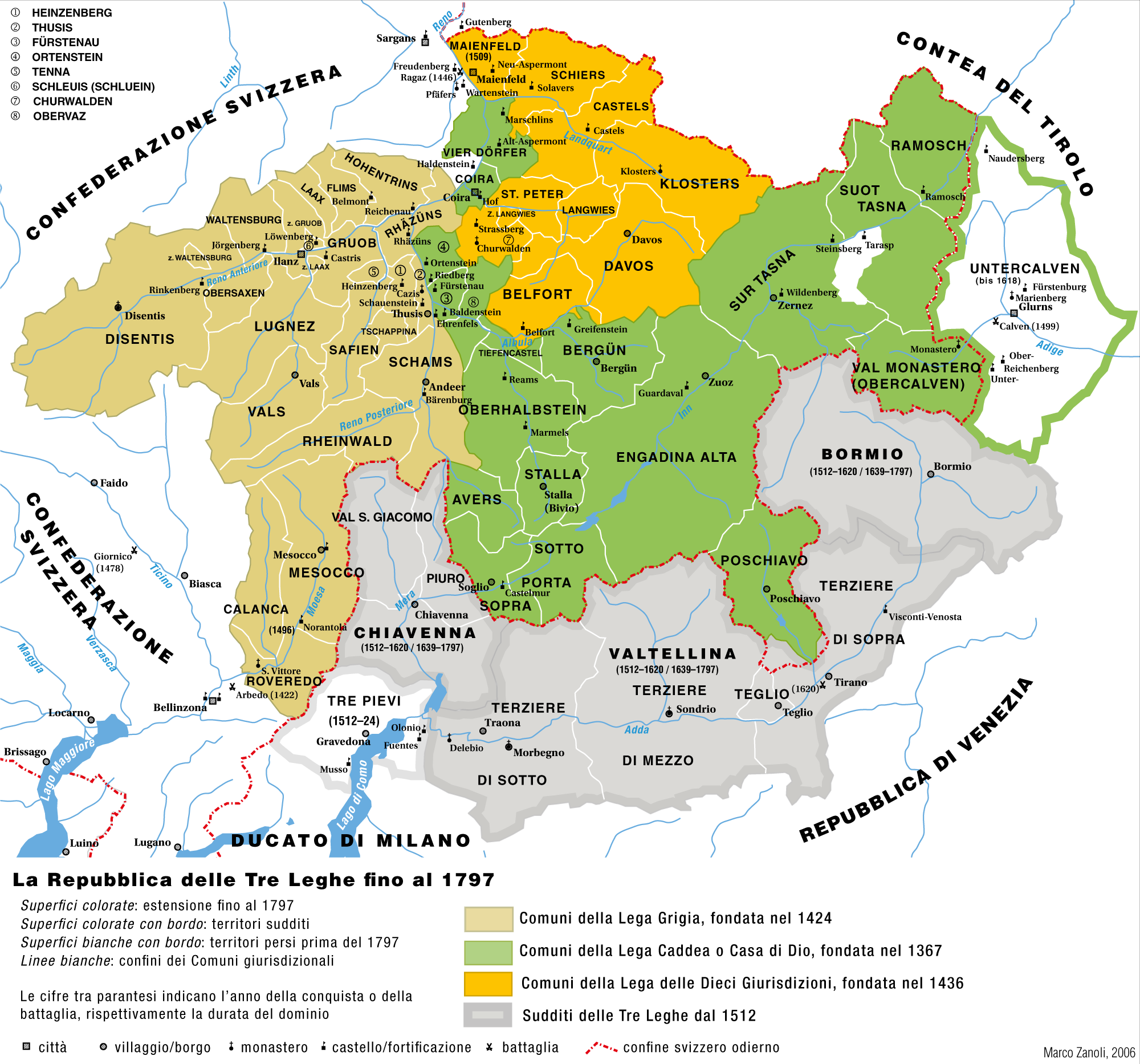
Map with Tre Pievi just south of the grey area of Valchiavenna, ruled by the Three Leagues from 1512-1797 together with Valtellina and Bormio

The Tre Pievi ("three parishes", in German historically Drei Pleven) are a historical territory on the shores of Lake Como, consisting of the villages of Dongo, Sorico and Gravedona, now part of the Province of Como, Italy.

The villages were owned by the city-state of Como from the early medieval period, and along with Como passed to the Duchy of Milan in 1335. In 1512, the three villages sought the protection of the Three Leagues. From this time, the villages were administrated by a bailiff designated by the Three Leagues.

After the Swiss defeat at the Battle of Marignano in 1515, the three villages again declared their allegiance to the Duchy of Milan, but the Three Leagues refused to recognize this and sent an occupying force. In Perpetual Peace of 1516 between France and Switzerland, the villages were not named so that their de jure affiliation remained uncertain, and the king of France (as duke of Milan) demanded that the Three Leagues return the villages to Milan. The Milanese steward of Musso occupied Sorico and Gravedona, resulting in the armed conflict known as Müsserkrieg. The Three Leagues were forced to abandon their claim on the territory in 1526, and it remained part of the Duchy of Milan during the Early Modern period.
