= Philip A. Vernon =

Canadian psychologist (born 1950)

Philip Anthony "Tony" Vernon (born 1950) is a Canadian psychologist. He is a professor and intelligence researcher. Vernon is the former editor-in-chief of the scientific journal Personality and Individual Differences and formerly sat on the editorial board of Intelligence and the board of directors of the International Society for the Study of Individual Differences (ISSID).

== Life and career ==
Vernon was born in England. His father Philip E. Vernon also studied intellectual abilities.

Vernon has taught at University of Western Ontario.

He received a grant from Pioneer Fund. According to their website, "he and his collaborators at the University of Western Ontario used state-of-the-art Magnetic Resonance Imaging (MRI) techniques and found that IQ scores are related to brain size. In one study, they reported the results for 40 adult females for whom the correlation between brain size and IQ was 0.40. In a subsequent study, this time of 68 adult males, they again found a 0.40 correlation between brain volume and IQ. They also showed that external head size measures such as head length, head width, and head circumference also correlated with IQ scores, but only about 0.20, and that brain size correlated more highly with the g component of IQ scores."

Among other areas, Vernon has researched race and intelligence. In 1994 he was one of 52 signatories on "Mainstream Science on Intelligence," an editorial written by Linda Gottfredson and published in Intelligence in 1997.
