= Wars of Kappel =

Series of armed conflicts

The wars of Kappel (Kappelerkriege) is a collective term for two armed conflicts fought near Kappel am Albis between the Catholic and the Protestant cantons of the Old Swiss Confederacy during the Reformation in Switzerland.

== First War ==
The first conflict saw the establishment of the Christian Union (formed of cantons Lucerne, Uri, Schwyz, Unterwalden, and Zug) in order to stop the spread of Protestantism throughout Switzerland. The union was a rejection of Swiss leader Ulrich Zwingli's attempts at forced reformation.

=== Events ===
In 1529, after enlisting the help of the leaders of the forest cantons, Zwingli attempted to reform the cantons by force. However, the winning diplomacy of the Union forced the Protestants to not cross the border, postponing the conflict until 1531.

== Second War ==
The canton of Zürich was the principal supporter of Zwingli and the movement of Swiss reformation. When they fought the Musso War against the Duchy of Milan, the member states of the Catholic Union refused to provide aid. Zwingli immediately sanctioned the Catholic cantons.
