= Philip E. Vernon =

British-born Canadian psychologist (1905–1987)

Philip Ewart Vernon
- Born: 6 June 1905; Oxford, England
- Died: 28 July 1987 (aged 82); Calgary, Canada
- Education: University of Cambridge
- Spouse: Dorothy F. Vernon
- Children: Philip A. Vernon
- Scientific career
- Fields: Psychology, Health psychology, Qualitative psychological research
- Workplaces: University of Glasgow; University of London; University of Calgary
- Thesis: The psychology of music: with especial reference to its appreciation, perception and composition (1932)

Philip Ewart Vernon (6 June 1905 – 28 July 1987) was a British-born Canadian psychologist and author. He studied intellectual ability with a focus on race and intelligence.

== Life ==
Philip Vernon was born in Oxford, England on 6 June 1905. His father was H. M. Vernon who was a lecturer in physiology at the University of Oxford, and was Great Britain's foremost figure in industrial psychology. His mother Dorothea Ewart was author of several works on Italian history. Philip worked with his wife, Dorothy, in the study of gifted children. They had one son, Philip Anthony Vernon, who also researched intellectual abilities. When Vernon joined the University of Calgary, he became a Canadian citizen. While in Canada, Vernon participated in winter sports and was a board member of the Calgary Philharmonic Orchestra. Vernon died of cancer in 1987. After his passing, the University of Calgary started giving an award for higher education students in his name for social sciences, educational psychology, humanities, or fine arts: music and genetics.

== Education ==
Vernon studied classics and natural sciences at Cambridge University before he studied psychology with F. C. Bartlett. In 1927, he graduated with a B.A. with first class honours in physics, physiology, psychology and chemistry. He received his M.A. in 1930 from St. John's College and his PhD in 1931 from Cambridge University. His dissertation focused on the psychology of musical appreciation and auditory perception. He had multiple different careers during the 1930s and 1940s, as well as completing multiple postdoctoral fellowships at Yale and Harvard before going to the University of London to finish his DSc in 1952. Vernon worked as a professor at multiple different universities once he finished his DSc. After London, Vernon went to the University of Calgary and was made an honorary doctor of laws in 1978.

== Career ==
Vernon studied and lectured in at least twenty-eight countries; and held a number of posts throughout his career.

- Research and teaching fellowship at St. John's College in Cambridge.
- Rockefeller fellowship allowed him to travel to the United States to gain knowledge on the measurement of personality.
- Psychological research advisor to the admiralty and war office creating training methods and selection tests during World War II.
- Child psychologist at the Maudsley Hospital Child Guidance Clinic in London in 1933.
- Head of the psychology department at the University of Glasgow in 1938–1947.
- Head of the psychology department at Jordan-Hill Training Centre in Glasgow.
- Professor of educational psychology at the University of London Institute of Education from 1949 to 1968.
- Professor of psychology at the University of London in 1964–1968.
- Professor of educational psychology at the University of Calgary in 1968–1978.

Vernon worked with Gordon Allport to investigate expressive movement and to develop the Allport-Vernon Study of Values. Throughout his career, Vernon addressed the topics of heredity and environment and racial differences in intelligence. Vernon assessed hypotheses about cultural and genetic influences on educational, professional, and economic achievements of Japanese and Chinese immigrants to North America. In studying the relationship between heredity and environment, Vernon recognized the role of environmental factors, but his research led him to determine that approximately sixty per cent of the variance in human intellectual ability is attributable to genetic factors, and that there is some evidence implicating genes in racial group differences in average levels of mental ability.

He received a grant from Pioneer Fund in 1982, which he used to document the substantial social class differences in IQ scores found in both the US and the UK. According to the Pioneer Fund website,

the analysis of the World War I American military conscripts showed that the average IQ of children born in the professional class was 123, whereas those born to unskilled workers averaged 96. Vernon concluded that these social class differences have some genetic basis. He based this assessment on his review of the evidence that the intelligence of adopted children related more to the social class of their biological parents than to that of their adopting parents. Vernon suggested that social mobility allows those with higher intelligence to rise in the social hierarchy, while those with lower intelligence tend to fall.

In 1968, at the age of 63, he abandoned a secure academic career in England to start a second career at the University of Calgary. The Philip E. Vernon Award at University of Calgary is named in his honour.

== Major contributions ==
Vernon preferred factor analysis for research and applied this approach to intelligence. At the top of his hierarchical model was Spearman's g and then there were two major group factors; verbal-educational ability (v:ed) and practical-spatial-mechanical abilities (k:m) which could always be decomposed into smaller factors. The factors at the top were more general abilities that affected a wide range of intelligent behaviors while those factors at the bottom involved specific skills for an act. Vernon extended intelligence theory by adding the importance of the test which he called Intelligence C.

Vernon's view of intelligence was a geographic metaphor meaning he viewed intelligence as a map of the mind. The basic unit of analysis in this metaphor is that there are factors that are the sources of individual differences in intelligence among people.

In looking at possible causes for higher IQ scores, Vernon found that people who had faster conduction velocity in the median nerve of the arm had higher IQs.

== Publications ==
Author of 14 books and approximately 200 journal articles:

- Study of Values: A Scale for Measuring the Dominant Interests in Personality. (1931)
- The Measurement of Abilities (1940)
- The Structure of Human Abilities (1950)
- Intelligence and Attainment Tests (1960)
- Personality Assessment: A Critical Survey (1964)
- Intelligence and Cultural Environment (1969)
- Creativity: Selected Readings (1970) [editor]
- The Psychology and Education of Gifted Children (1977)
- Intelligence: Heredity and Environment (1979)
- The Abilities and Achievements of Orientals in North America (1982)
- Speed of Information Processing and Intelligence (1987)
