= Treaty of Paris (1623) =

1623 treaty between France, Savoy, and Venice

The Treaty of Paris was signed on 7 February 1623, between France, Savoy, and Venice. All three signatories agreed to re-establish the territory of Valtelline by attempting to remove Spanish forces stationed there.

== See also ==
- List of treaties
