= Valtellina =

Valley in Northern Italy

Coordinates: 46°10′N 9°52′E

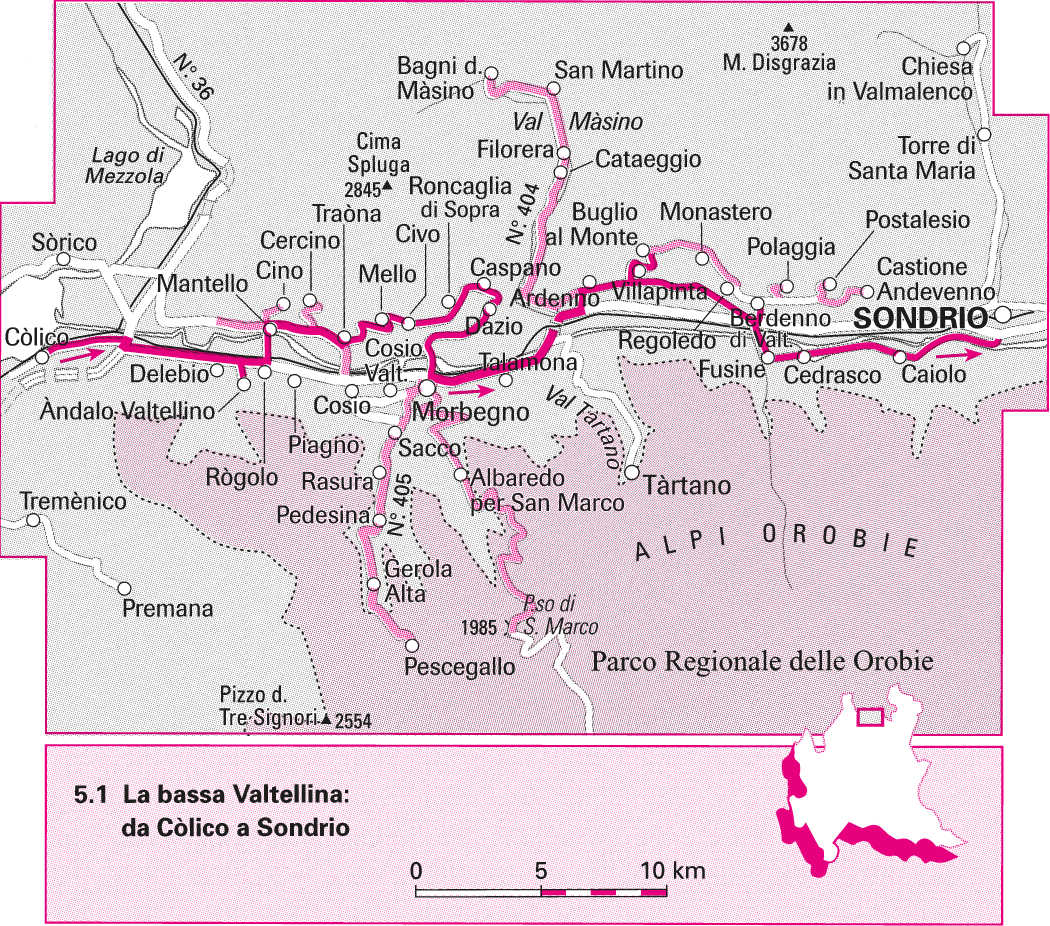
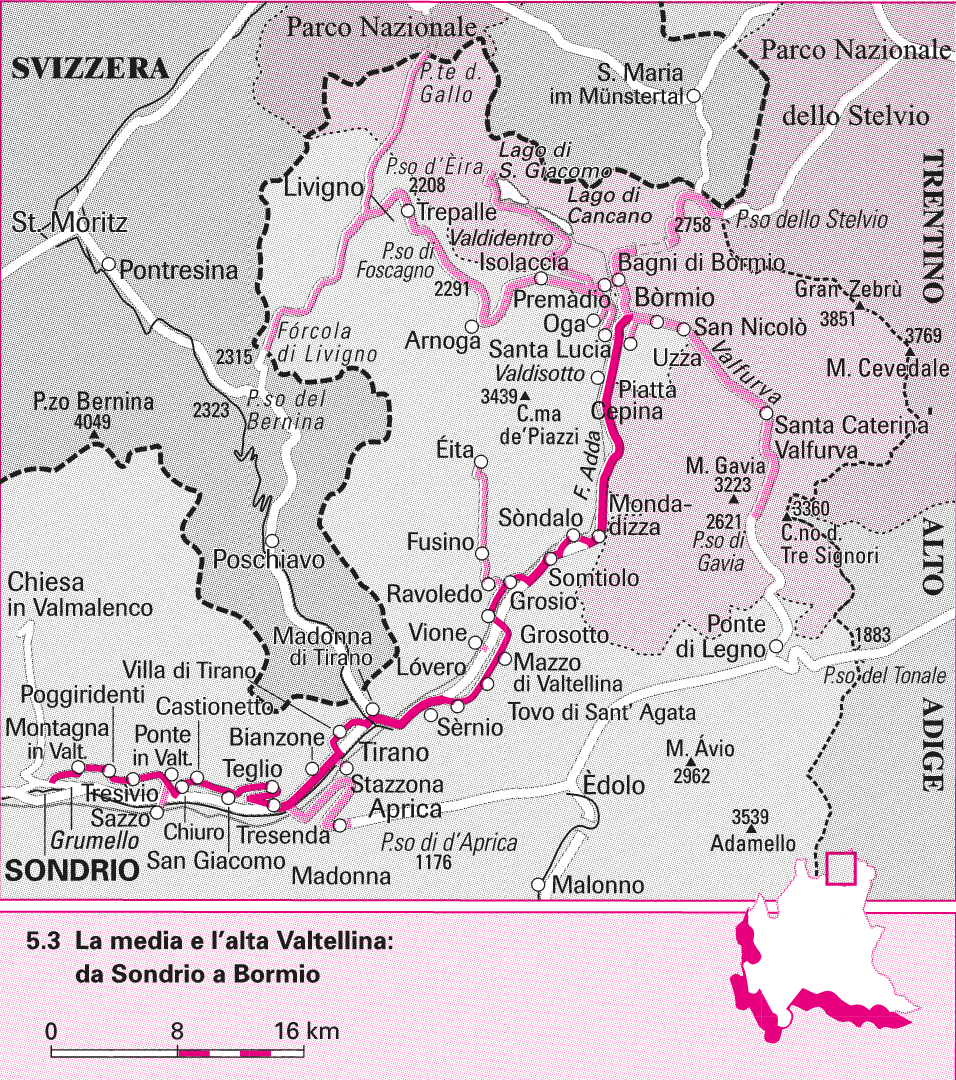
Lower and upper Valtellina

Proposed flag for Valchiavenna (upper left), Upper Valtellina (upper right) and Valtellina (lower part)

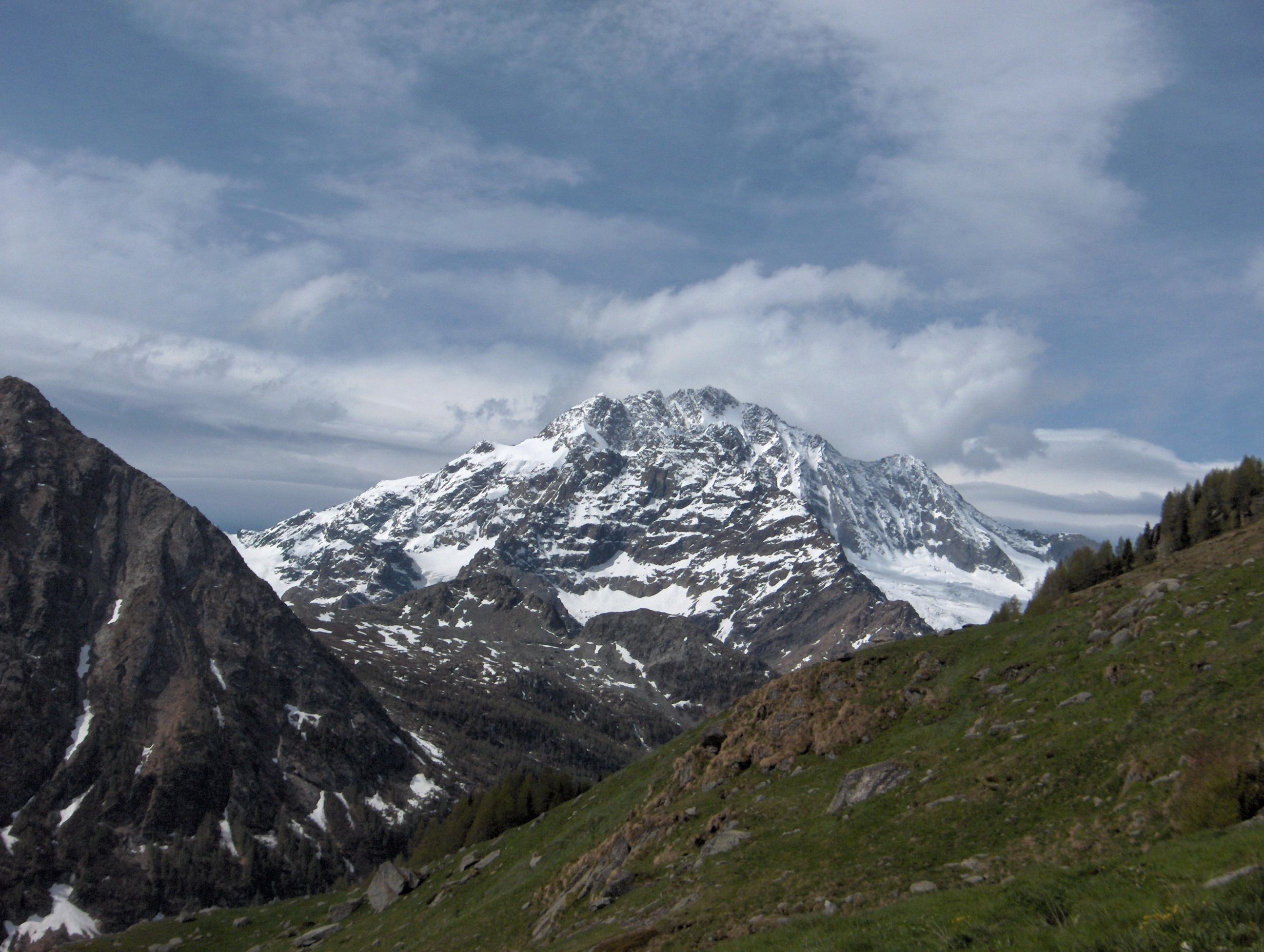
Monte Disgrazia (3,678m) in the north of the Valtellina

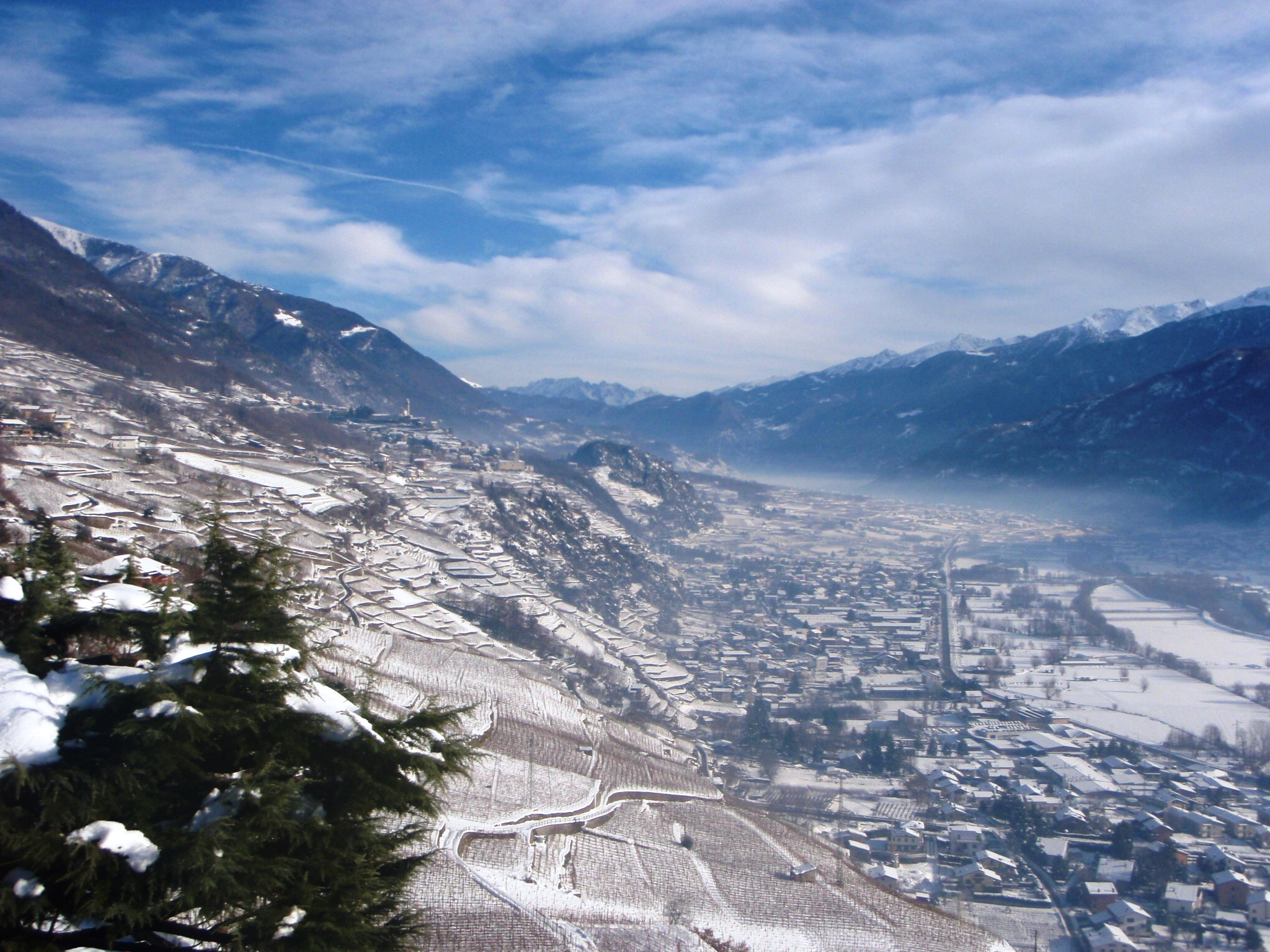
A view of the Valtellina from Castel Grumello

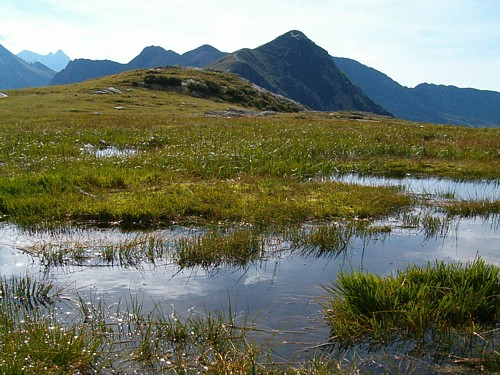
The San Marco Pass in the south of the Valtellina

Valtellina (Italian: [valtelˈliːna]; Romansh: Vuclina; Lombard: Valtelina or Valtulina; German: Veltlin), or the Valtelline (English, occasionally spelled as Val Telline), is a valley in the Lombardy region of northern Italy, bordering Switzerland. Today it is known for its ski centre, hot spring spas, bresaola, cheeses (in particular Bitto, named after the river Bitto) and wines. It was a key Alpine pass between northern Italy and Germany. The control of the Valtellina was much sought after, particularly during the Thirty Years' War as it was an important part of the Spanish Road.

== Geography ==
The most important comune of the valley is Sondrio; the others major centres are Aprica, Morbegno, Tirano, Bormio and Livigno. Although Livigno is on the northern side of the alpine watershed, it is considered part of Valtellina as it falls within the province of Sondrio.

== History ==
=== Antiquity and the middle ages ===
The region was conquered in 16 BC by the Romans. By the 5th century, it was Christianized with around ten pieve (rural churches with a baptistery) under the Diocese of Como. The Lombards gained control over the area after 720, but about fifty years later Charlemagne gave the valley to Saint Denis Monastery near Paris. Later the valley returned to the Bishop of Como.

=== Early modern period ===
Map of the Three Leagues, with the grey area of Valchiavenna, Tre Pievi, Valtellina, and Bormio, which were all ruled by it from 1512 to 1797

Throughout the 16th, 17th, and 18th centuries, the Valtellina belonged to the Three Leagues (the "Grey Leagues"), then a mutual-defence region independent of Switzerland but now the easternmost Swiss Canton of Graubünden. This is an area in which German, Romansh, Lombard, and Italian are all spoken, hence the Valtellina became known variously as Veltlin, Westtirol (West Tyrol), and the Welsche Vogteien ("Romanic Bailiwicks").

During the Thirty Years' War, the Valtellina was a theatre of intense military and diplomatic struggle between France, the Habsburg powers and the local authorities, which culminated in the Valtellina War of 1620–1626. Control over the routes through the Valtellina to the passes between Lombardy and the Danube watershed was at stake, as these formed part of the so-called Spanish Road. Anti-Habsburg Protestants in the Three Leagues established a court of 'clerical overseers', which between 1618 and 1620 handed down a number of convictions (often in absentia) against Catholics in the Leagues and Valtellina. This included the arrest under false pretences and death by torture of the (Catholic) arch-priest Nicolò Rusca of Sondrio. This and similar harsh judgments of the anti-Habsburg Thusis court led to a conspiracy to drive the Protestants out of the valley. The leader of the conspiracy, Giacomo Robustelli of the Planta family, had ties to Madrid, Rome, and Paris. On the evening of 18/19 July 1620, a force of Valtellina rebels supported by Austrian and Italian troops marched into Tirano and began killing Protestants. When they finished in Tirano, they marched to Teglio, Sondrio and further down the valley killing every Protestant that they found. Between 500 and 600 people were killed on that night and over the following four days. The attack drove nearly all the Protestants out of the valley, prevented further Protestant incursions, and took the Valtellina out of the Three Leagues. The killings in Valtellina were part of the conflicts in Graubünden known as the Bündner Wirren or Confusion of the Leagues.

In February 1623, France, Savoy, and Venice signed the Treaty of Paris, in which they agreed to re-establish the territory of Valtellina by expelling the Spanish forces stationed there.

=== 18th and 19th centuries ===
In 1797, the growing power of the French First Republic created the Cisalpine Republic in Northern Italy. On 10 October 1797, the French supported a revolt in the Valtellina against the Graubünden (Grisons in French and English), and it joined the Cisalpine Republic.

After the Congress of Vienna in 1815, the Valtellina became part of the Kingdom of Lombardy–Venetia, which was a constituent land of the Austrian Empire. Together with Lombardy, it came to the Kingdom of Sardinia in 1859 and finally became part of the Kingdom of Italy in 1861.

There was substantial migration out of the Valtellina at the end of the 19th century, for reasons of the prevailing economically depressed conditions of the region and for young men to avoid conscription. Australia was a popular destination for such migrants, especially Western Australia.

Industrially, the area is famous for being the home of the world's first mainline electrified railway. The electrification of the Ferrovia della Valtellina took place in 1902, using three-phase power at 3,600 volts, with a maximum speed of 70 km/h. The system was designed by Hungarian engineer Kálmán Kandó who was employed by the main contractors, the Budapest-based Ganz company.

=== Mussolini and the Valtellina Redoubt ===
During the last months of World War II, the Italian dictator Benito Mussolini and other diehard fascist leaders of the Italian Social Republic (RSI) proposed making a "last stand" against the advancing Allied armies in the Valtellina. The Fascist Party secretary Alessandro Pavolini was the main proponent of the idea, which he first raised with Mussolini in September 1944. However, the fascist leadership was divided over the plan and only minimal preparatory work was carried out to establish the area as a stronghold. By the time the Allies made their final advance in April 1945, the Valtellina was not ready to be used as a redoubt. In any event, Mussolini's capture on 27 April by the partisans at Dongo, barely short of the Valtellina, ended any possibility of a fascist last stand.

== Culture and language ==
The official language is Italian, but the Valtellinese variety of the Lombard language is also spoken.

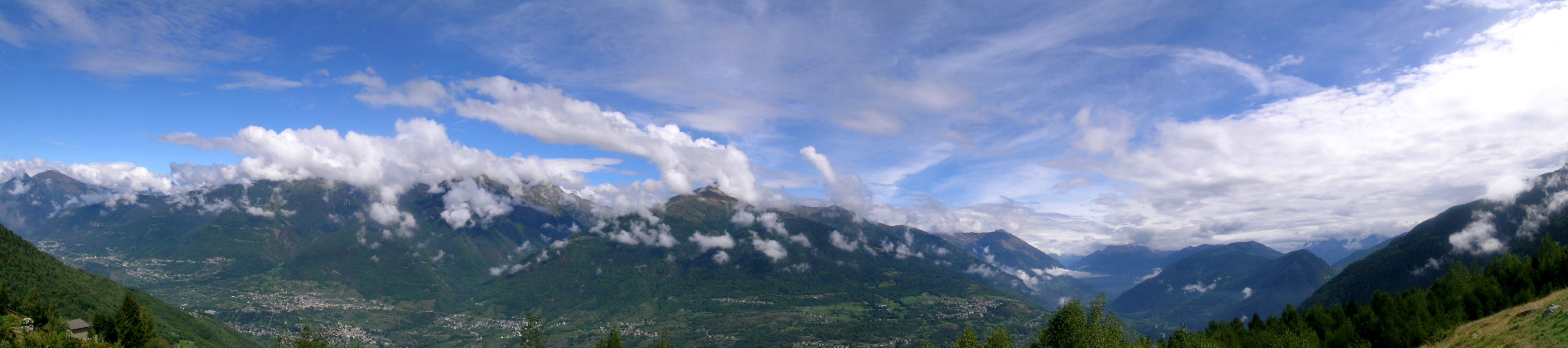
Panorama of the Valtellina from Alpe Piazzola in the comune of Castello dell'Acqua

== Folklore ==
=== L'è foeu el sginer and l'è foeu l'ors de la tana ===
On 31 January there was the tradition of l'è foeu el sginer ("January's out"), a custom very similar to that celebrated on 2 February known as l'è foeu l'ors de la tana ("the bear is out from its den"). Both celebrated the end of winter and the imminent arrival of spring. The two customs involved walking around the town and inviting people to leave their houses under any pretext, like throwing a large piece of wood or a pot down the stairs. When people ran outside to check what had happened, they were greeted with the shout l'è foeu el sginer! or l'è foeu l'ors de la tana!

=== Intraverser l'ann ===
Intraverser l'èn or intraverser l'ann (literally "to put the year across") was also celebrated on New Year's Eve: during the night, young people used to build barricades of gates, doors, benches, agricultural tools, logs, stairs, sledges, and carts in the main square, or in front of the church, to prevent the old year from leaving. The next morning, the owners of the stolen objects had to go and recover them, dismantling the barricade and metaphorically opening up the way to the new year.

=== The gabinat ===
On 6 January, the custom of the gabinat is still celebrated today, especially in Tirano, in the Upper Valley, and in the nearby Poschiavo Valley (Switzerland). Traditionally, children would suddenly enter other people's homes shouting gabinat! and in exchange, they would receive a handful of cooked chestnuts, some sweets or dried fruit. The adults competed to precede the other in exclaiming gabinat when they met. Whoever lost had to pay a pledge; often, the prize at stake was established in advance and the gabinat thus became the object of bets. To win, various strategies were adopted: stalking, disguises, fake illnesses ... Nowadays, it is only the children who do the gabinat, and they usually show up to relatives, friends, and local shopkeepers.

The custom of the gabinat most likely comes from Bavaria, Germany, where Christmas, New Year's Eve and Epiphany were indicated with the name Geb-nacht (Gaben means "gifts" and Nacht means "night", therefore "night of gifts"): on the eve of these holidays, the poor young people sang in front of the doors of the wealthiest in the hope to receive a gift.

=== Andà a ciamà l'erba (Let's go call the grass) ===
On the first day of March each year, throughout Valtellina and Valchiavenna, people used to go to ciamà l'erba ("call the grass"). The children walked in the meadows making a noise with cowbells to call the grass and awaken it from its winter slumber. This custom also served to propitiate a bountiful harvest.

=== The Carneval vegg (Old Carnival) ===
In the village of Grosio, the Carnival is celebrated, unlike the rest of Valtellina, on the first Sunday of Lent, according to the Ambrosian calendar in force before the Gregorian Reform. For this reason, it is called Carneval vegg ("Old Carnival").

In the past, it was customary for people to gather all together to dance, sing, eat and drink. Being an agricultural ritual that represents the death of winter and the beginning of summer, Carnival officially began on 17 January with the parade of the blessed cattle adorned with coloured ribbons. It included numerous bonfires, with which the paths were cleared to facilitate the passage of farmers, their agricultural vehicles and their livestock. A straw puppet with horns on his head representing the Carnival was also burnt.

Nowadays, the districts of the towns challenge each other to the sound of allegorical floats, and the parade is attended by traditional masks, eight characters representing traditions, past events, and moments of everyday life: the Old Carnival, a bearded and joyful man dressed as a mountaineer, and Lean Lent, a thin woman dressed in a humble way, with a dark handkerchief on her head and an empty basket on her arm, represent the transition from the glories of Carnival to Lenten fasts. They are accompanied by the Paralytic, the Bear Handler, a funny shepherd who dances and rolls on the ground named Toni, an old man with a butt covered with Nutella, a hunchbacked mountaineer whose hump is filled with chestnut urchins, and Bernarda, a man disguised as a baby put in a pannier supported by a fake old woman, and accompanied by another man dressed as a farmer).

During the Carnival period, manzòli or manzòla, white flour and buckwheat pancakes mixed with slices of cheese and cut into the shape of a calf were eaten to propitiate the abundance of livestock parts.

=== The Carneval di Mat (Carnival of the fools) ===
In Bormio, during the day of the Carnival of the Fools, the Mayor hands over his power to the Podestà di Mat (Podestà of the Fools) to Harlequin, and to the Compagnia di Mat ("the Company of the Fools") who give a public reading of the gossip and complaints that citizens have deposited in a box placed in the square of the Kuerc. The festival also includes a parade along the streets of the historic centre led by the Harlequins of the Company of Mat, with children escorting the Podestà.

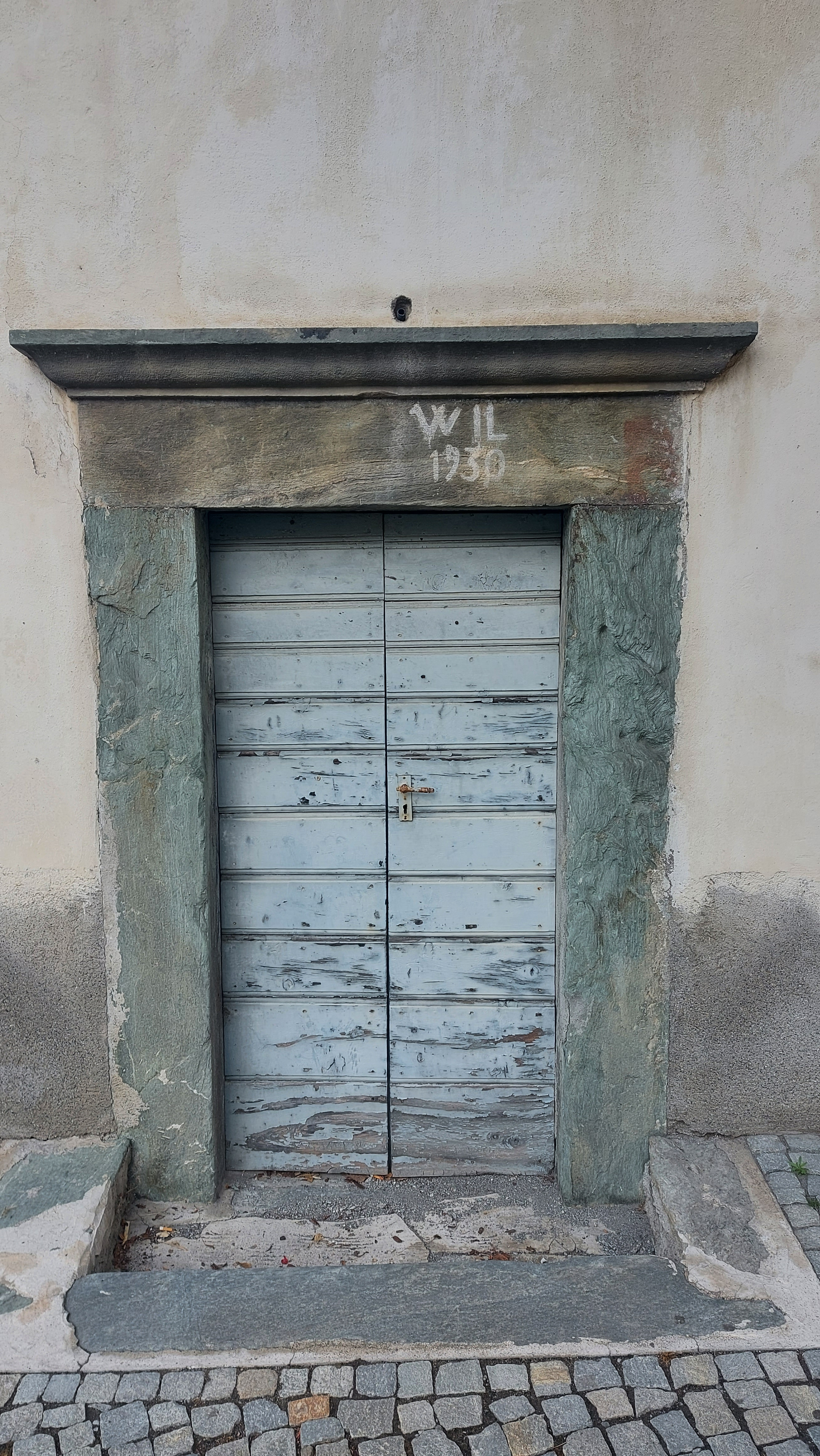
"Cheers to the year 1930" written on one of the doors of Mazzo di Valtellina

=== La coscrizione (the conscription) ===
The conscription was originally a celebration on the occasion of the call to the draft: the tradition seems to have originated in the second half of the nineteenth century with the unification of Italy when young men were forced to serve a period in the Army. The feast of the conscripts of eighteen-year-olds was therefore a kind of rite of passage to adulthood. Today is simply the celebration of the coming of age.

The duration of the celebration varied from town to town: in Grosio the conscription could last up to ten days, during which the boys and girls met in bars, taverns, or in places specially set up for the purpose. The conscripts had the task of embroidering on the tricolour flag the symbol and possibly the motto that the group had chosen. On the walls of the villages, it was customary to write W LA CLASSE... ("cheers to the year...") followed by the year of birth: nowadays, conscripts hang a tricolour banner with the same wording and the names (or nicknames) of the members of the group.

The feast of the conscripts is particularly felt in Alta Valtellina: in Grosio, for a week, the conscripts meet in a club to celebrate and travel through the streets of the town in a car from which the flag decorated with the symbol of the group waves. On New Year's Eve, amid fireworks and the noise of whistles, cowbells, motorcycles, and tractors, they entrust the flag to conscripts one year younger, after having it blessed in church. Each group chooses different coloured sweatshirts and decorates the tricolour with a symbol that represents the group's motto or identity.

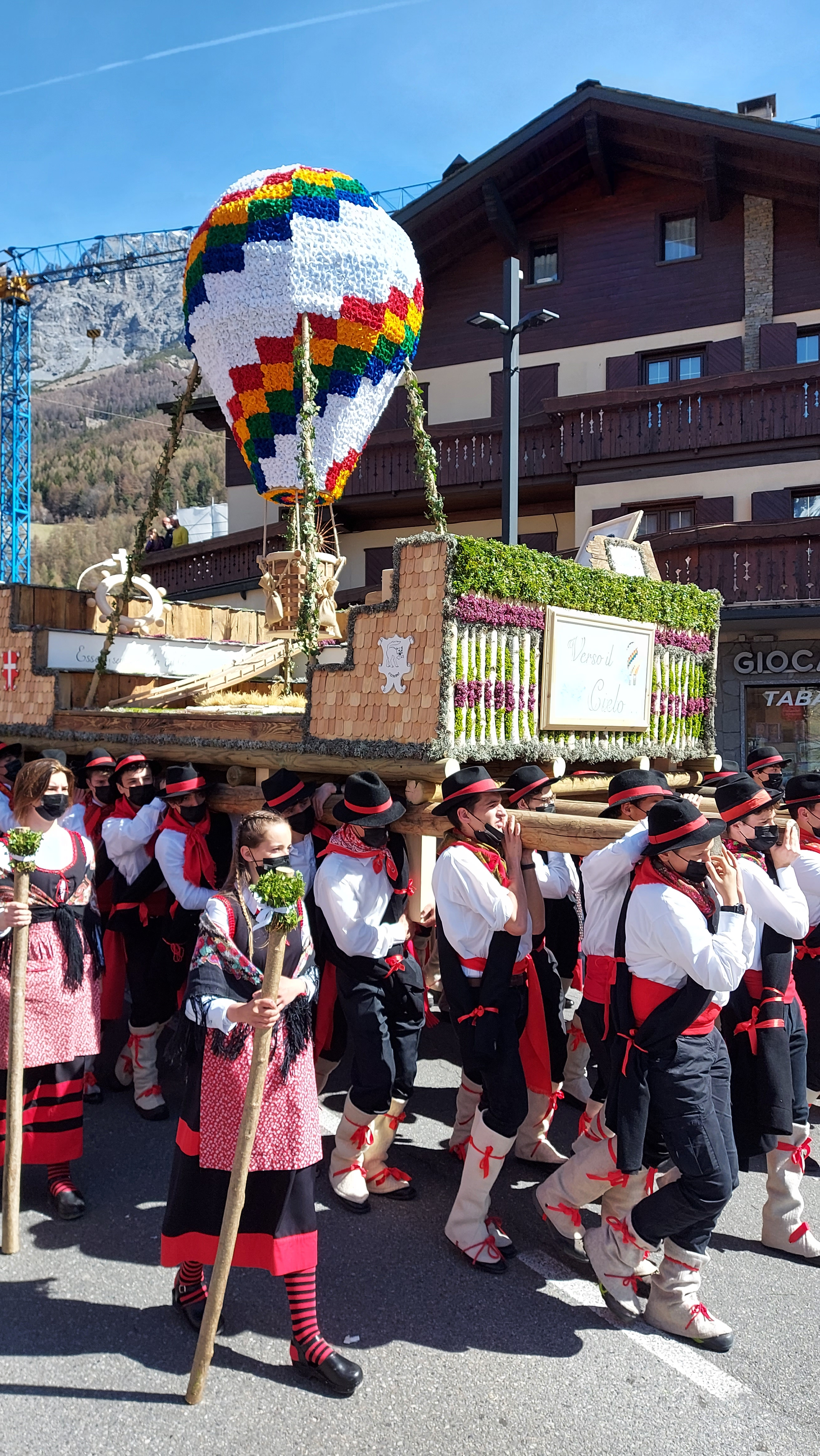
One of the religious floats carried on the shoulders by the "Pasquali" of Bormio traditionally dressed

=== I Pasquali ===
The Pasquali are allegorical floats with a religious theme, prepared during the winter by the various districts of Bormio (Buglio, Combo, Dossiglio, Dossorovina and Maggiore) for Easter (Pasqua meaning Easter in Italian). On Easter day, the Pasquali are carried on the shoulders of the boys and are accompanied by a band, folk groups, women, seniors, and children who embellish the parade with flowers and other small crafts. Everyone wears the traditional red, black and white costume. After having followed the entire Via Roma and upon arrival at the Piazza del Kuerc (the main square of the town) the ancient bell called Bajona starts tolling and a jury draws up a ranking of the best Pasquali. At the end of the parade, the floats are exhibited in Piazza del Kuerc where they stay until Easter Monday.

=== Il Palio delle Contrade ===
Started in 1963, the Palio delle Contrade sees the inhabitants of the five districts of Bormio compete against each other, divided according to age, in downhill, cross-country, combined, and relay races. The cross-country race takes place through the streets of the town, covered with snow for the purpose.

== Wines ==
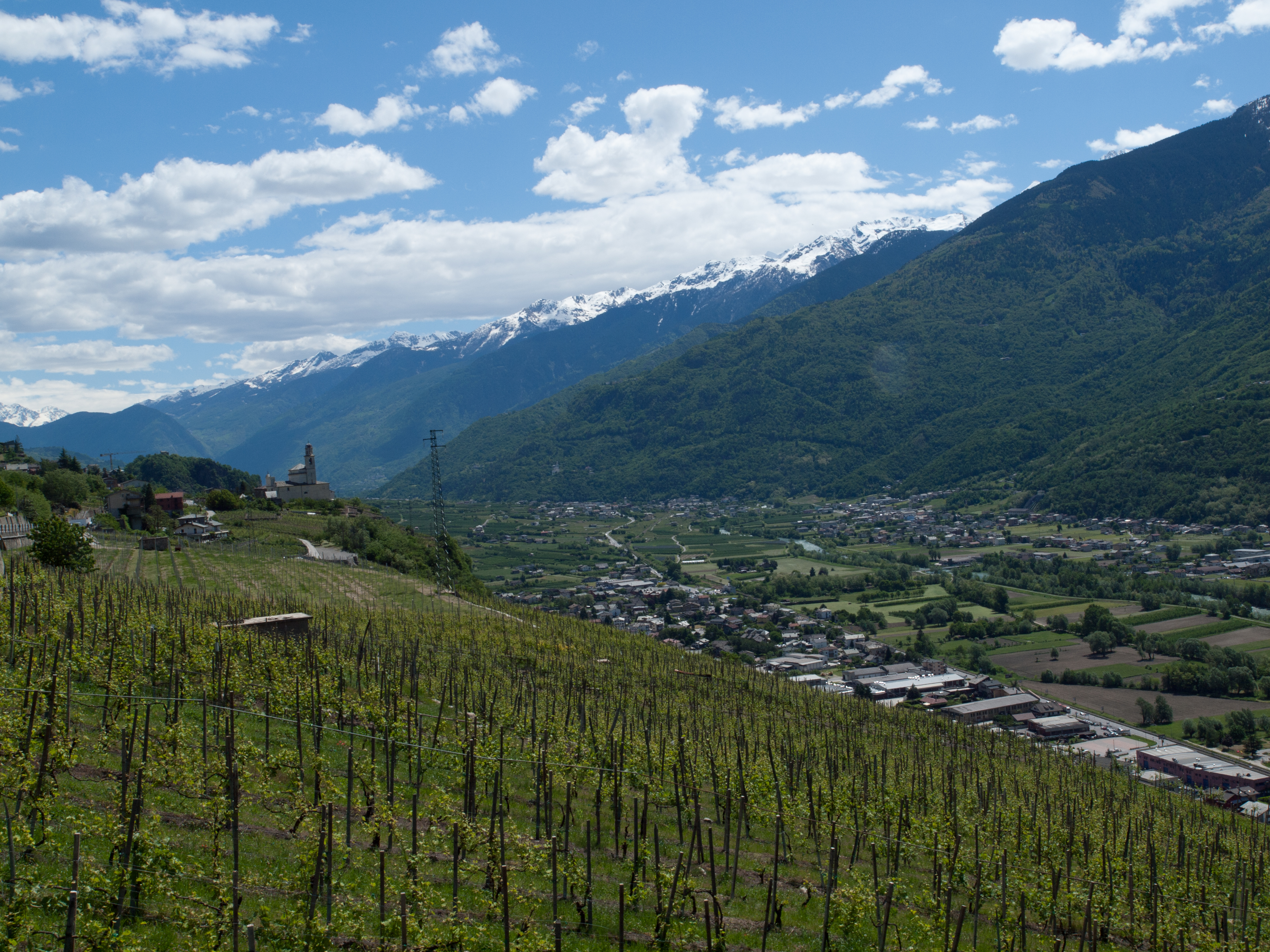
Vineyards in Valtellina

In Valtellina, wines are produced mainly from Chiavennasca (the local name of Nebbiolo grape variety) with other minor varieties such as Rossola nera permitted up to 20% for the Denominazione di origine controllata (DOC) and 10% for the Denominazione di Origine Controllata e Garantita (DOCG). Grapes are limited to a harvest yield of 12 tonnes per hectare. The finished wine must be aged for at least two years prior to release (three years if a Riserva bottling) with a minimum alcohol level of at least 11%. Yields for the DOCG wines are further restricted to a maximum of 8 tonnes/ha. While the ageing requirements are the same as the DOC, the minimum alcohol level for the DOCG wine is 12%.

The best-known villages for red wines are: Grumello, Sassella, Inferno, Valgella and Maroggia. The village names are normally indicated on the label. Additionally, there is an Amarone style DOCG wine called Sforzato (Sfursat).

Similar wines are produced in the lower part of the Val Poschiavo (the valley in the Graubünden canton of Switzerland that descends into the Valtellina at Tirano), but under different regulations such as appellation and the allowance of sugar addition, or chaptalization.

== Tourism ==
One of the most notable tourist attractions of the area is the Bernina Line ("Trenino Rosso", little red train) of the Rhaetian Railway, which links the town of Tirano in the Valtellina with St. Moritz in Graubünden, Switzerland via the Bernina Pass. The mountains of the Valtellina offer numerous possibilities for sports activities: skiing and winter sports in Bormio, Aprica or Livigno, hiking and biking in the same locations and especially in the secondary valleys, and rock climbing in the Val Masino.

The Rupe Magna, a unique large rock with more than 5,000 engraved figures dating from between the 4th and 1st millennia BCE, can be found at the Rock Engraving Park in Grosio.

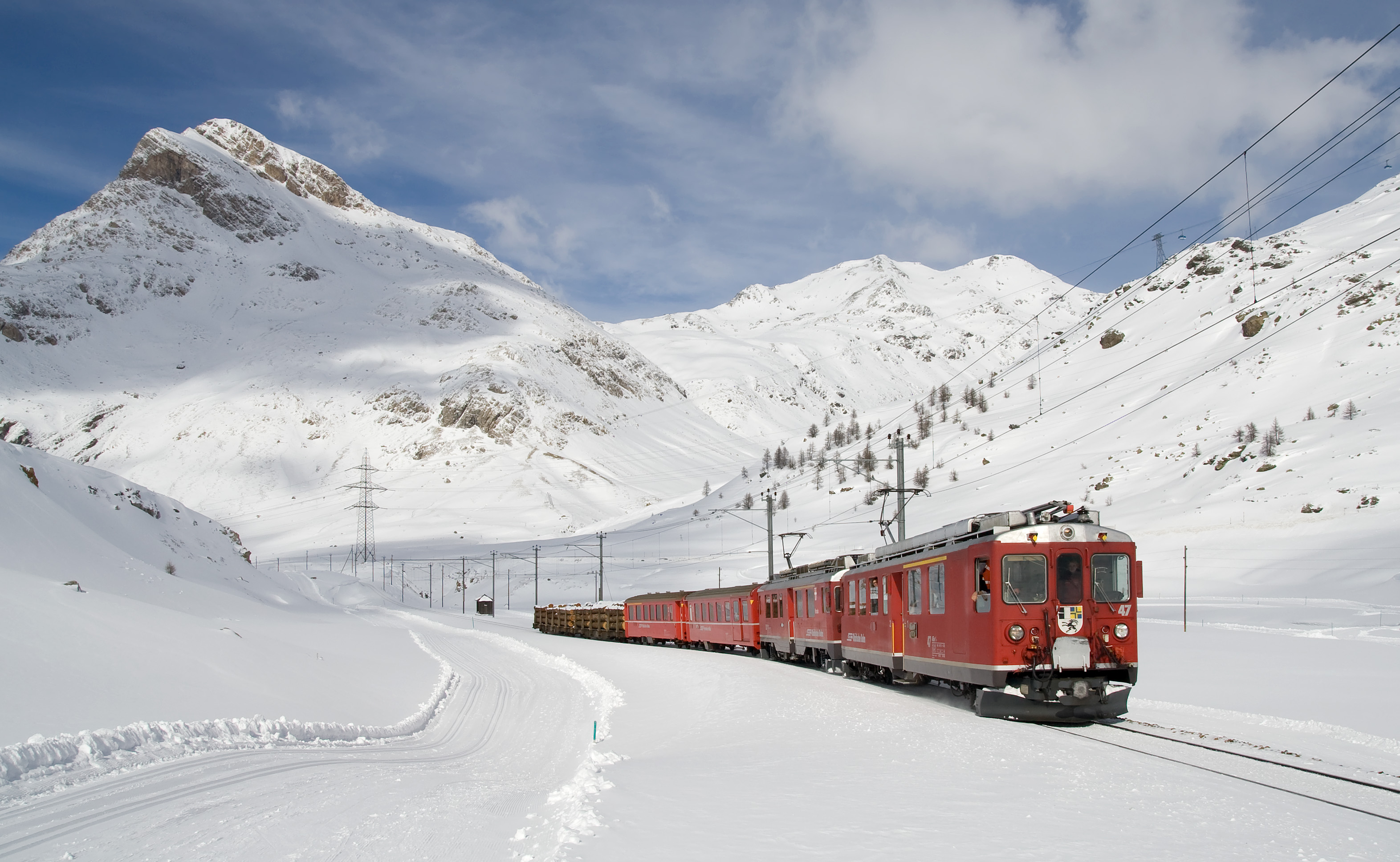
Bernina Line of the Rhaetian Railway

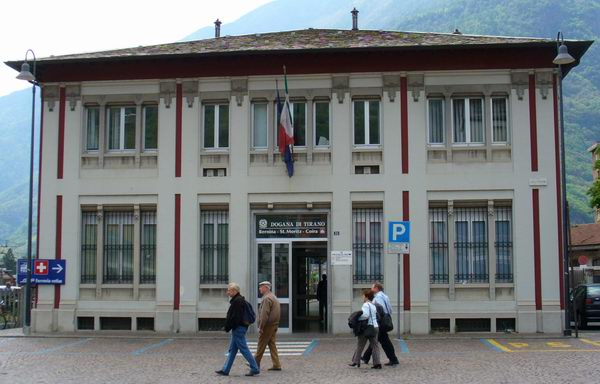
Tirano - Bernina Line train station

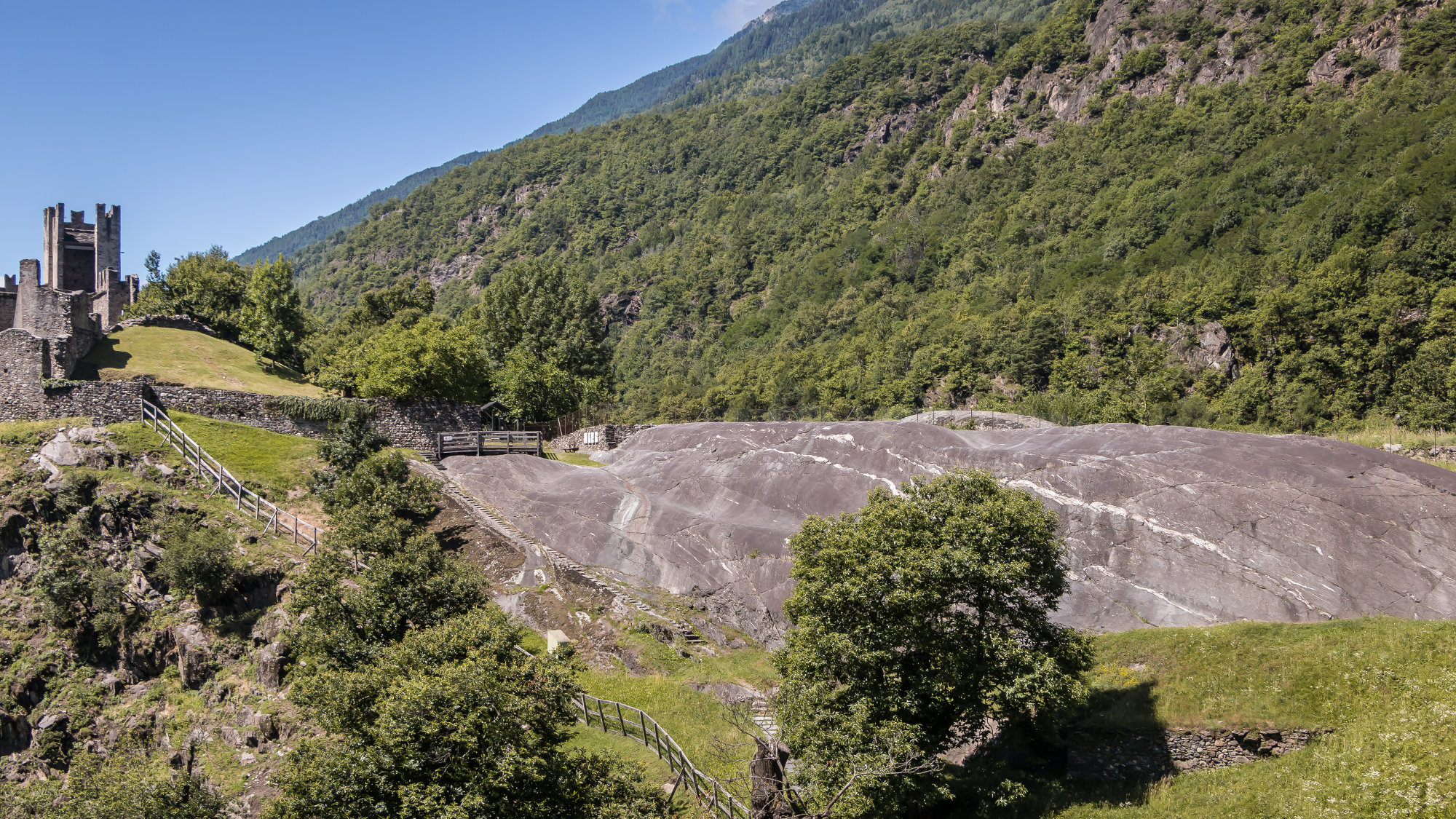
Rock Engraving Park-Grosio; Rupe Magna

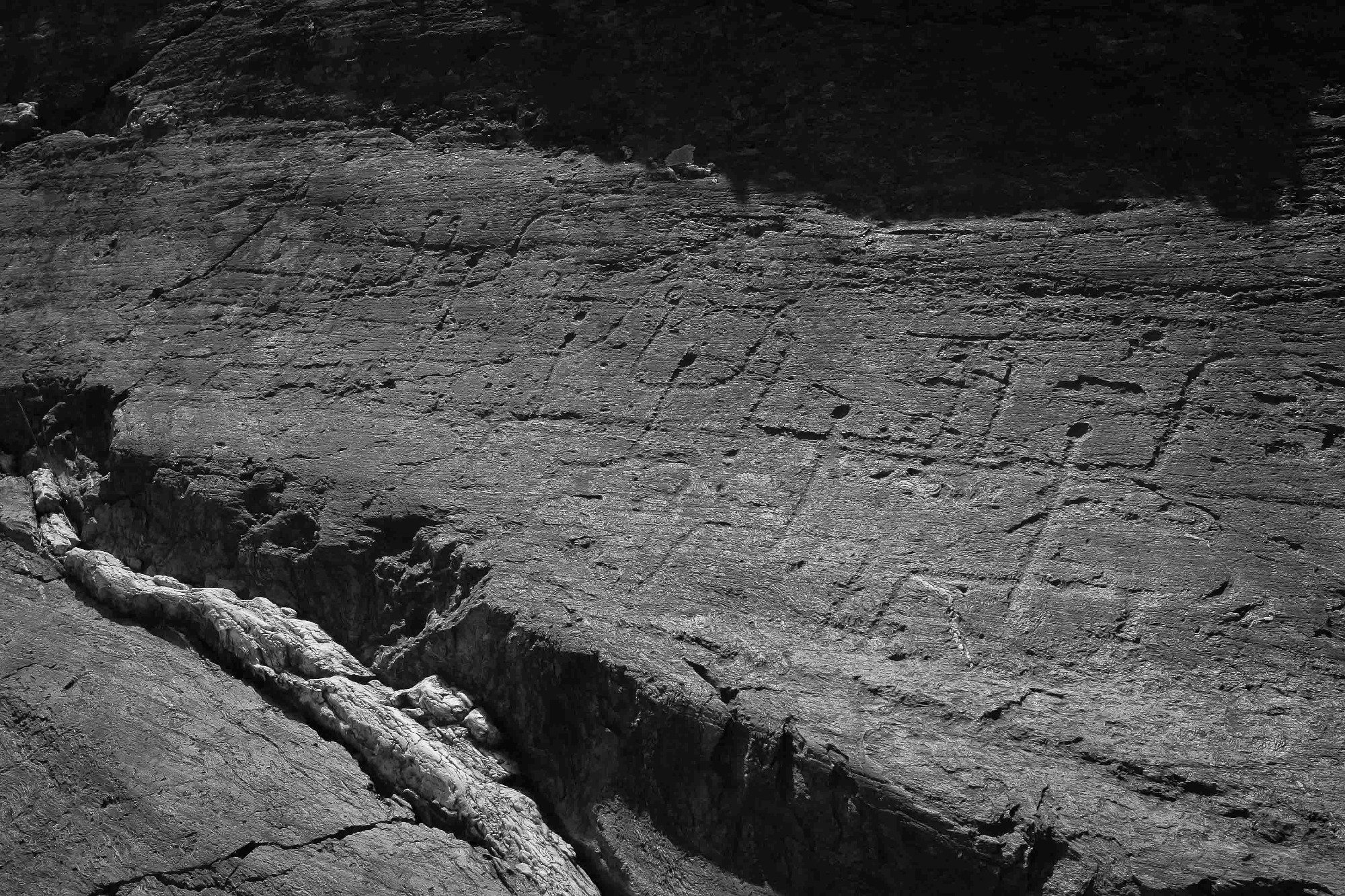
Rock Engraving Park-Grosio; Rupe Magna

== Notable people ==
Born in Valtellina:

- Achille Compagnoni (mountaineer)
- Deborah Compagnoni (Alpine skier)
- Marco De Gasperi (athlete, skyrunner)
- Arianna Fontana (short track speed skater)
- Fabio Meraldi (ski mountaineer)
- Giuseppe Piazzi (priest, mathematician and astronomer)
- Luigi Torelli (patriot)
- Giulio Tremonti (politician)
- Fabrizio Capobianco (entrepreneur)
- Paolo Giudici (data scientist)

== See also ==
- 2026 Winter Olympics
- Valtellina disaster
