= Dorothea Ewart =

British historian (1870–1956)

Katharine Dorothea Ewart
- Born: 26 November 1870; Bishops Cannings, Wiltshire, England
- Died: 21 May 1956 (aged 85); Isleworth, England
- Education: University of Oxford
- Occupation: Author
- Spouse: Horace Middleton Vernon
- Children: Magdalen Vernon, Philip Vernon
- Writing career
- Language: English
- Subject: Italian history

Katharine Dorothea Ewart (26 November 1870 – 21 May 1956) was a British historian and author of books on Italian history.

== Early life ==
She was born at the vicarage in Bishops Cannings, Wiltshire on 26 November 1870, the daughter of William Ewart (1818 – 1873), vicar of Bishops Cannings, and his wife, Katharine, née Matthews (1840 – 1918). After her father's death, her widowed mother settled in Bristol where Dorothea was educated at Clifton High School for Girls. She won a Clothworkers' scholarship at Somerville College, Oxford, where she took first-class honours in modern history in 1893. She served as secretary for the Oxford Association for Mental Welfare.

== Family ==
On 12 December 1899, she married Horace Middleton Vernon, an Oxford scholar of physiology. The couple settled in Oxford and had five children, of whom a son and three daughters survived to adulthood. Their eldest daughter Magdalen and their son Philip both later became eminent professors of psychology.

== Published works ==
Her first work was a biography of Cosimo de' Medici published in 1899 as part of Macmillan's Foreign Statesmen Series. In 1909 she published a survey of Italian history entitled Italy 1494–1790, part of the Cambridge Historical Series, which was reviewed as a welcome contribution to the subject. In 1909 she also wrote a short history of the Oxford University Museum with her husband. She coauthored Italy, Medieval and Modern, a History, published in 1917. Her final work was The Story of Italy, published in 1939.

== Death ==
She was widowed by her husband's death in 1951. She died in the mental hospital at Wyke House, Syon Lane, Isleworth, Middlesex, on 21 May 1956.

== Sources ==
- Bartrip, P.W.J. (2004). "Vernon, Horace Middleton (1870–1951), physiologist and industrial health specialist". Oxford Dictionary of National Biography (online ed.). Oxford University Press. doi:10.1093/ref:odnb/106741. ISBN 978-0-19-861411-1. (Subscription, Wikipedia Library access or UK public library membership required.)
- BPS. "Vernon; Philip Ewart (1905-1987); Professor; HonFBPsS". The History of Psychology Centre. The British Psychological Society.
- Bryant, Hilda; Wheeler, P (1961). Somerville College Register, 1879-1959. Oxford: University Press.
- Ewart, K. Dorothea (1899). Cosimo de' Medici. London: Macmillan and Co.
- Ewart, K. Dorothea (1909). Italy from 1494 to 1790. Cambridge: University Press.
- Ewart, K. Dorothea (1939). The story of Italy, from the end of the Roman empire to the beginning of the Italian kingdom. London: J. Clarke & Co., Ltd.
- Jamison, Evelyn M.; Ady, Cecelia M.; Ewart, K. Dorothea; Terry, Charles-Sanford; David, H.W.Carless (1917). Italy, Medieval and Modern, a History. Oxford: The Clarendon Press.
- JMS (1954). "Wyke House". Journal of Mental Science. October: 1.
- Thayer, William Roscoe (1909). "Italy from 1494 to 1790. By Mrs. H. M. Vernon (K. Dorothea Ewart)". The American Historical Review. 15 (1): 125–127. doi:10.1086/ahr/15.1.125.
- Vernon, Horace Middleton; Ewart, K. Dorothea (1909). A History of the Oxford Museum. Oxford: Clarendon Press.
