= Castelvecchi =

Locality in Tuscany, Italy

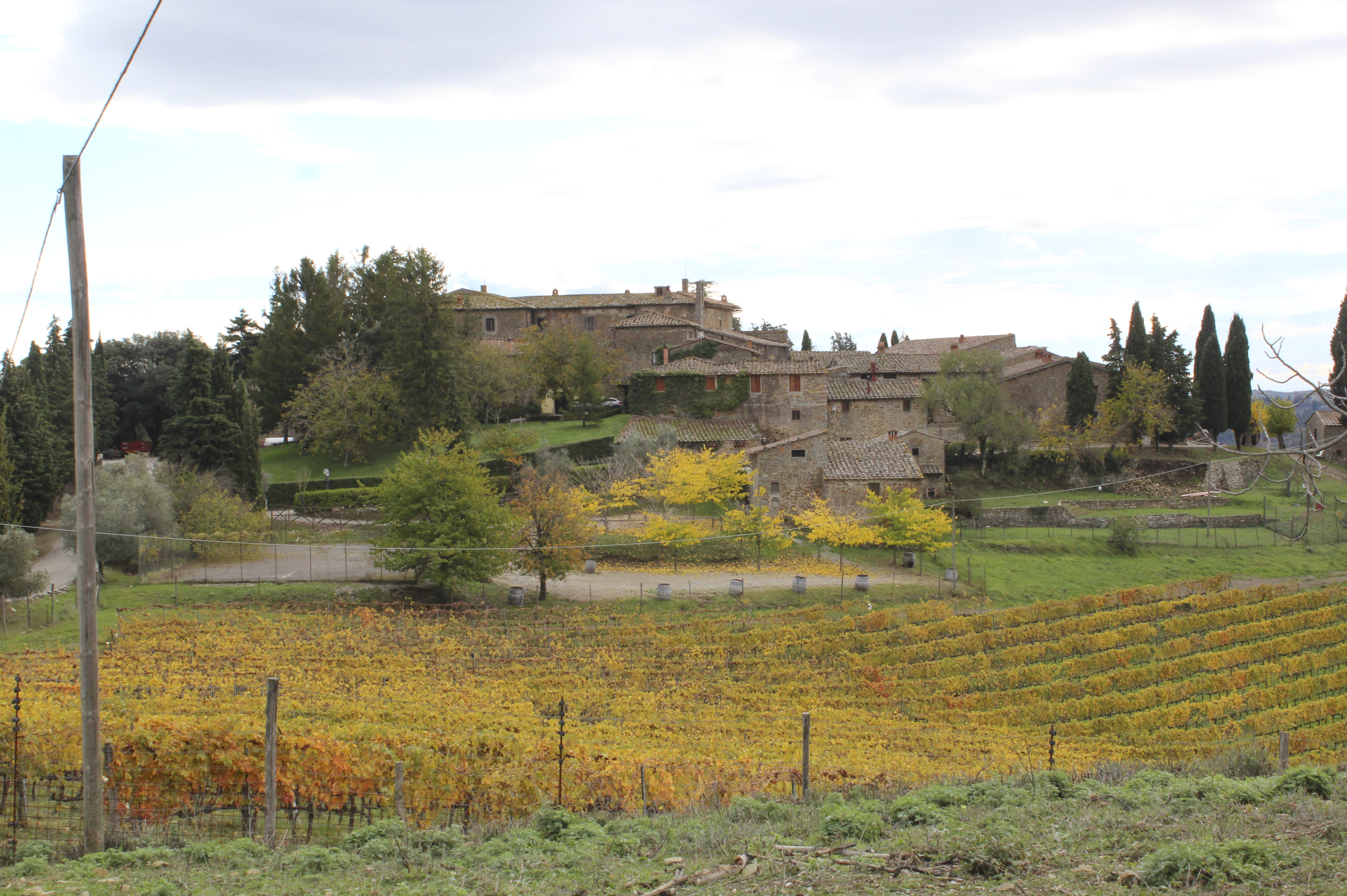
Castelvecchi

Castelvecchi is a locality in the Italian municipality of Radda in Chianti, in the province of Siena, Tuscany.

== History ==
The hamlet is on a hillock overlooking the Val di Pesa, at 558 m above sea level, on the road from Radda in Chianti to Panzano. The Archaeological Report of the Municipality of Radda in Chianti defines it as part of one of the four densest areas of archaeological sites in the municipality.

Founded in the 11th century, it is mentioned as castello et curtis in some ancient documents and was a defensive bulwark for the religious building of the Pieve di Santa Maria Novella.

During the early Middle Ages, the village probably represented the main settlement in the area and is referred to as castello della Pieve in some deeds. Dominated by the lords of Monte Rinaldi since the early 1000s, during the 13th century the resident community proclaimed itself autonomous.

In the Florentine land register of 1427, the place is still listed as a castle, indicating the existence of a structured complex of houses, and farms and other land. Around the 17th century, it assumed the name of the owners' family, first becoming Castel de' Vecchi and then, by contraction, Castelvecchi.

At the start of the 21st century, the village is quite different from the ancient fortress, although some remains of the walls and the layout of the houses – partly abandoned and gathered around the large central space – are evidence of the existence of the original castle.

Of more recent construction is the manor house, built in the early 19th century on the foundations of the ancient castle, in which the estate's thousand-year-old wine cellar is also located.

== Bibliography ==
- Ferdinando Anichini, Enciclopedia del Chianti senese, Siena, Cantagalli, 2005
- Enrico Bosi, Giovanna Magi., Il Chianti dei castelli: un itinerario nel paesaggio del Chianti fra antichi e suggestivi castelli, Firenze, Demo Media, 1997
- Roberto Bosi, Di castello in castello: il Chianti, Milano, La pietra, 1990
- Lorenzo Bosi, Le ville del Chianti, Pistoia, Tellini, 1981
- Paolo Cammarosano, Vincenzo Passeri, Mauro Guerrini., I castelli del senese. Strutture fortificate dell'area senese-grossetana, Siena, Nuova Immagine, 2006
- Maurizio Carnasciali, Gli edifici sacri nel comune di Radda in Chianti, Radda in Chianti, Studium editrice, 1996
- Reginaldo Cianferoni (a cura di), Veglie a Porcignano Museo diffuso del Chianti: contadini, nobili, preti chiantigiani fra conservazione e mutamento raccontate da Marcello Vanni, Verona, Edizioni BI&GI, 1985
- Antonio Stopani, La toponomastica del comune di Radda in Chianti, Centro di studi storici chiantigiani, 1994
- Marco Valenti, Il Chianti senese: Castellina in Chianti, Castelnuovo Berardenga, Gaiole in Chianti, Radda in Chianti, Siena, Nuova Immagine, 1995
