= Lucarelli, Radda in Chianti =

Lucarelli
- Frazione
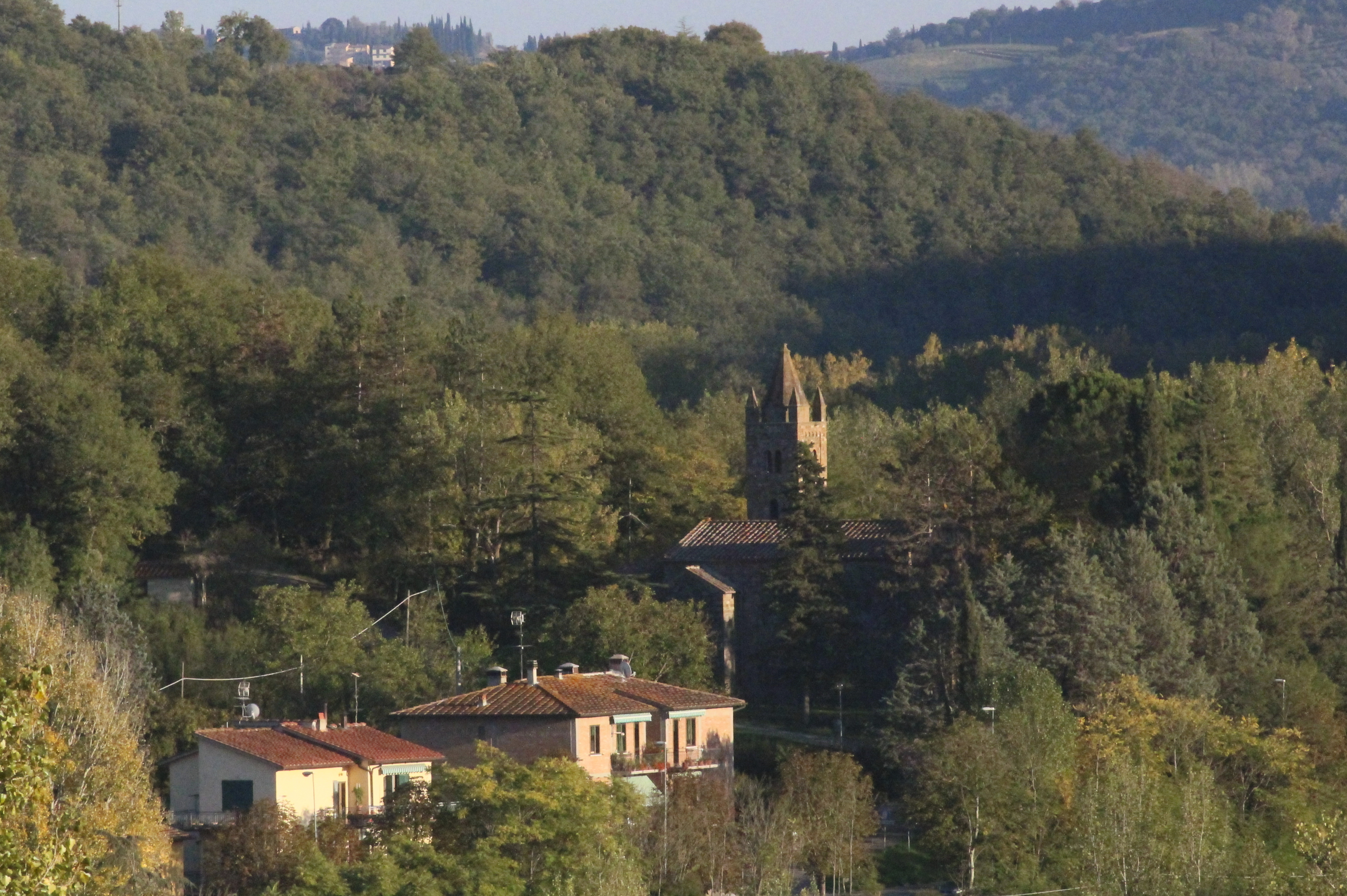
- View of Lucarelli

- Location of Lucarelli in Italy
- Coordinates: 43°31′3″N 11°18′44″E
- Country: Italy
- Region: Tuscany
- Province: Siena (SI)
- Comune: Radda in Chianti
- Elevation: 285 m (935 ft)

Population (2011)
  - Total: 69
- Demonym: Lucarellesi
- Time zone: UTC+1 (CET)
  - Summer (DST): UTC+2 (CEST)

Lucarelli is a village in Tuscany, central Italy, administratively a frazione of the comune of Radda in Chianti, province of Siena. At the time of the 2001 census its population was 65.

Lucarelli is about 36 km from Siena and 6 km from Radda in Chianti.
