= Radda in Chianti =

- Comune
- Comune di Radda in Chianti
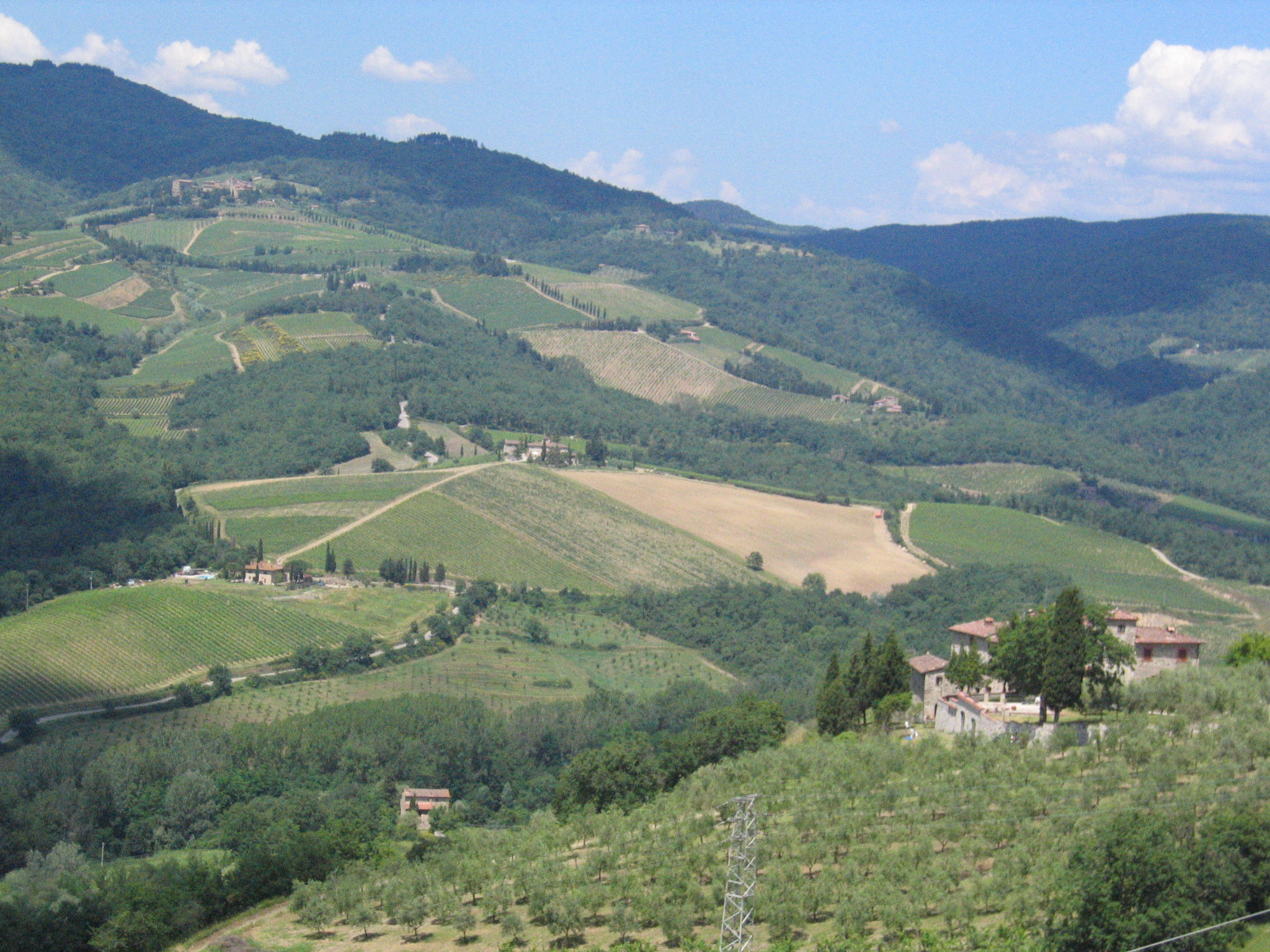

- Coat of arms

- Location within Italy Location within Tuscany
- Coordinates: 43°29′N 11°23′E
- Country: Italy
- Region: Tuscany
- Province: Siena (SI)
- Frazioni: Badia a Montemuro, Colle Petroso, Lucarelli, Monterinaldi, Palagio, San Fedele, Selvole, Volpaia

Government
  - Mayor: Pier Paolo Mugnaini

Area
  - Total: 80.42 km^{2} (31.05 sq mi)
- Elevation: 530 m (1,740 ft)

Population (31 December 2016)
  - Total: 1,587
  - Density: 19.73/km^{2} (51.11/sq mi)
- Demonym: Raddesi
- Time zone: UTC+1 (CET)
  - Summer (DST): UTC+2 (CEST)
- Postal code: 53017
- Dialing code: 0577
- Website: Official website

Radda in Chianti is a comune (municipality) in the Province of Siena in the Italian region Tuscany, located about 35 kilometres (22 miles) southeast of Florence and about 15 km (9 miles) north of Siena.

Radda in Chianti borders the following municipalities: Castellina in Chianti, Castelnuovo Berardenga, Cavriglia, Gaiole in Chianti, Greve in Chianti.

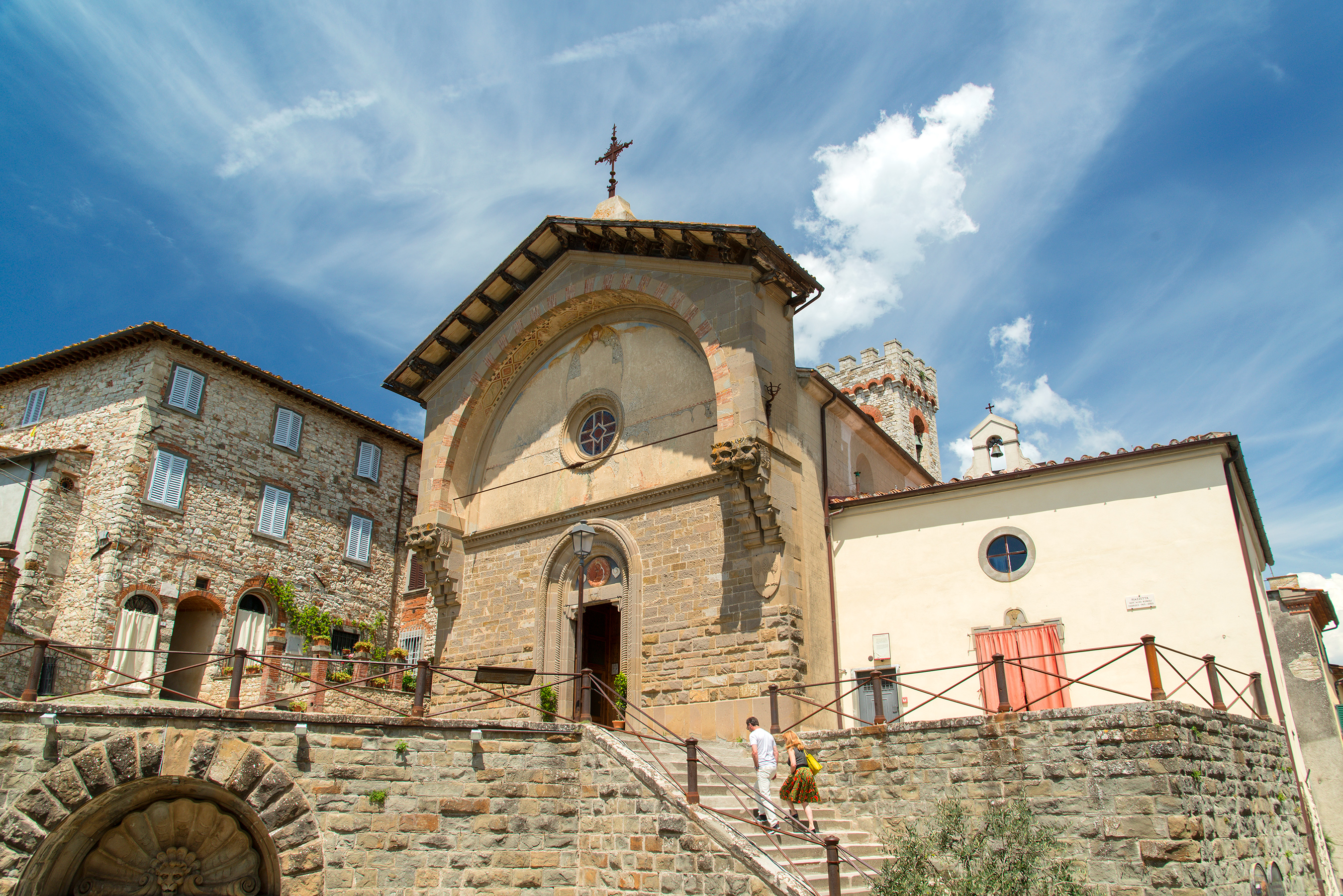
Propositura di San Niccola in Radda

== Twin towns ==
- Saint Brice, France

== See also ==
- History of Chianti
- Castelvecchi
