= Volpaia =

- Frazione
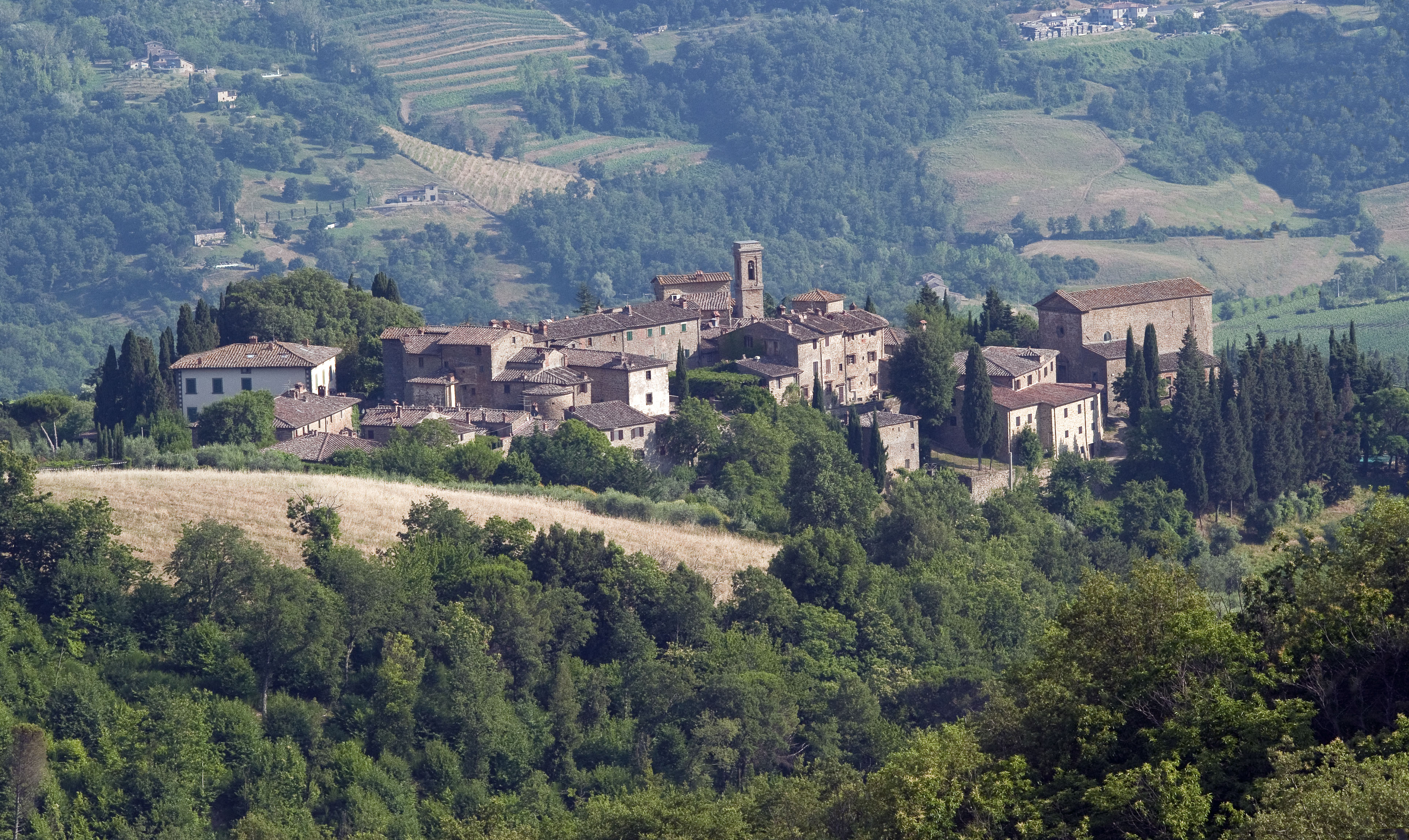
- View of Volpaia

- Location of Volpaia in Italy
- Country: Italy
- Region: Tuscany
- Province: Siena
- Comune: Radda in Chianti
- Elevation: 617 m (2,024 ft)

Population (2001)
  - Total: 44
- Demonym: Volpaiesi
- Time zone: UTC+1 (CET)
  - Summer (DST): UTC+2 (CEST)

Volpaia is a village in Tuscany, central Italy, administratively a frazione of the comune of Radda in Chianti, province of Siena. At the time of the 2001 census its population amounted to 44.

The village of Volpaia is situated on a hilltop just north of the town of Radda in Chianti, 2,024 feet (617 m) above sea level, in the heart of the Chianti Classico region.

Volpaia is a terra murata, a walled village. Although only part of the original protective walls and two of its six towers are still standing, the medieval layout and buildings within the village are still intact, making Volpaia one of the best-preserved villages of its period.

== History ==
Volpaia was built in the 11th century as a fortified village on the Florence-Siena border. Unlike Brolio, Meleto, and other Chianti-area castles.

The historical account of vine cultivation in Volpaia dates back to 1172, marking the early origins of viticulture in this region. In 1250, Volpaia played a significant role as one of the founding members of the Chianti League, a coalition formed by the Florentine Republic to manage its communities, divided into districts like Castellina, Radda, and Giaole, each with its designated territory. Volpaia was a part of the Terziere di Radda within the League. These territories held strategic importance as frontline garrison towns during the Florentine-Sienese wars. Notably, the emblem of the Chianti League, the Gallo Nero or Black Rooster, is now the trademark for the Consorzio Vino Chianti Classico, symbolizing this rich historical legacy.

== Main sights ==
- San Lorenzo, main parish church of the village
- Castello di Volpaia

== Bibliography ==
- Stopani, R and Moretti, I (1972). "Volpaia", Fattoria Castello di Volpaia.
