= Badia a Montemuro =

- Frazione
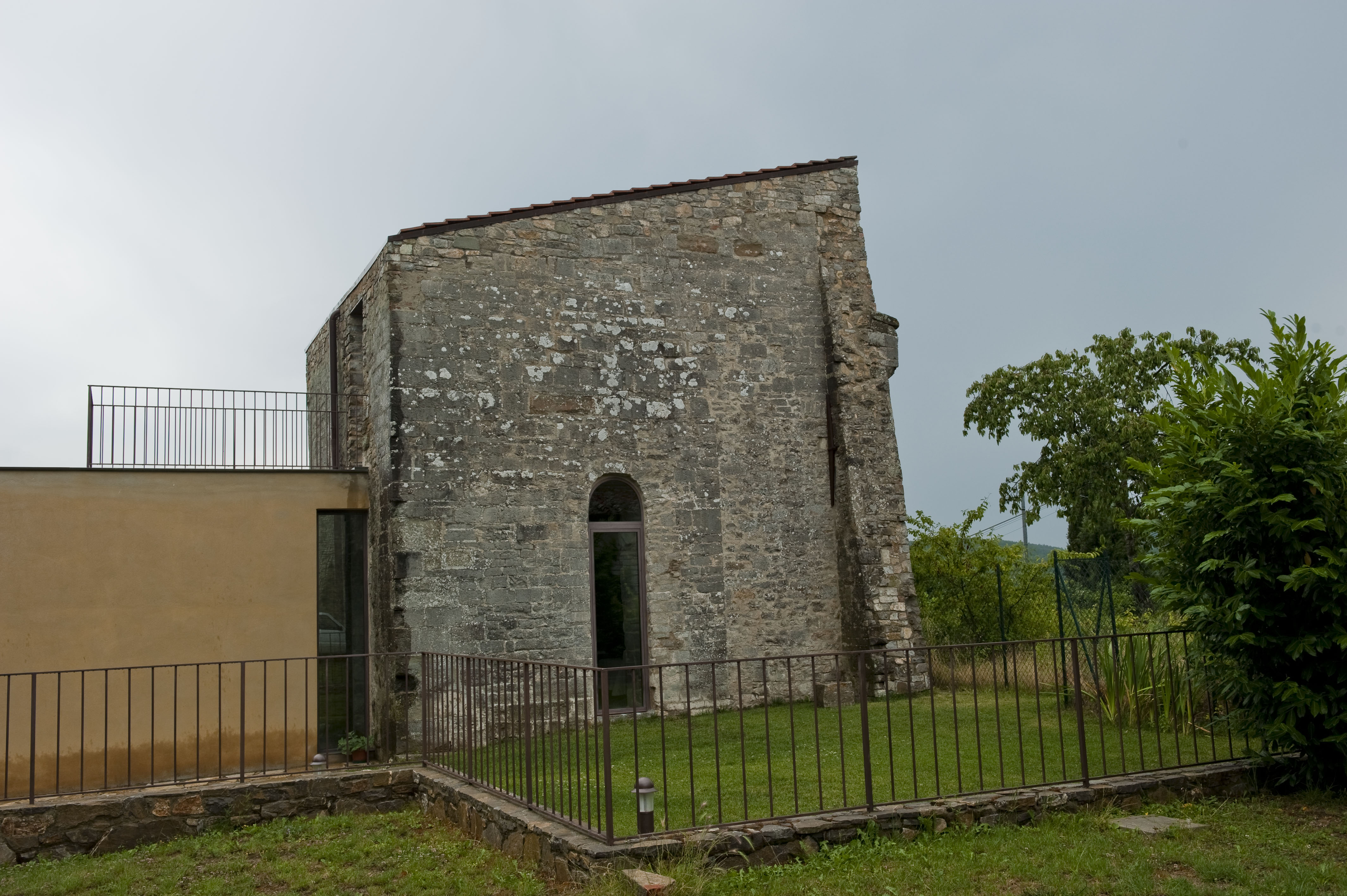
- The former abbey of Montemuro

- Location of Badia a Montemuro in Italy
- Coordinates: 43°32′44″N 11°23′51″E
- Country: Italy
- Region: Tuscany
- Province: Siena (SI)
- Comune: Radda in Chianti
- Elevation: 706 m (2,316 ft)

Population (2011)
  - Total: 26
- Time zone: UTC+1 (CET)
  - Summer (DST): UTC+2 (CEST)

Badia a Montemuro (or Badiaccia a Montemuro) is a village in Tuscany, central Italy, administratively a frazione of the comune of Radda in Chianti, province of Siena. At the time of the 2001 census its population was 26.

Badia a Montemuro is about 40 km from Siena and 14 km from Radda in Chianti.
