= Castello di Volpaia =

Winery in Europe

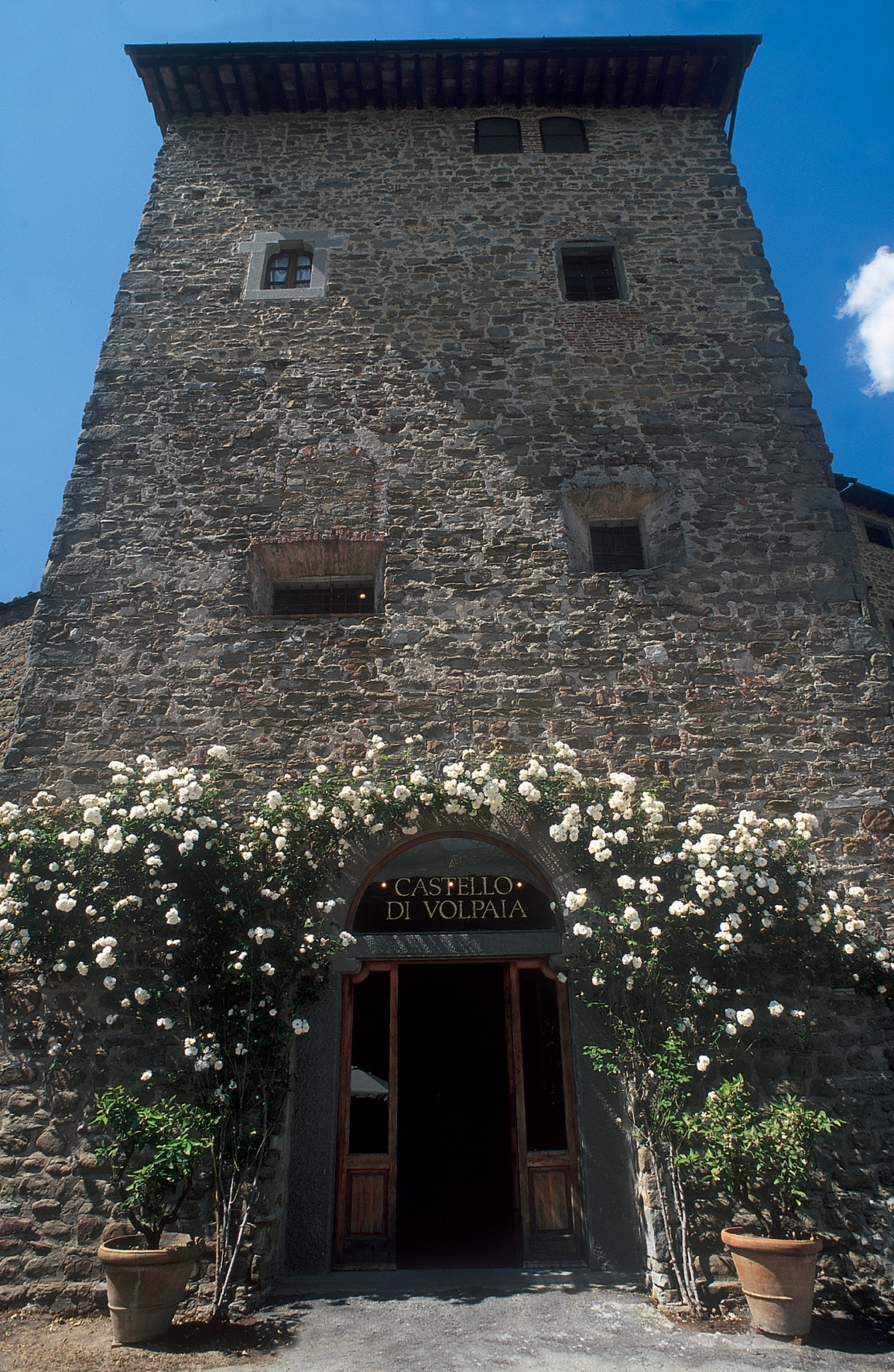
- Volpaia, the main square with the Wine Shop
- Location: Volpaia
- Coordinates: 43.5170676°N 11.3798964°E
- Wine region: Chianti
- Founded: 1972
- Varietals: Sangiovese, Merlot

Castello di Volpaia is a winery located in the medieval village of Volpaia. The estate spans over 900 acres (360 ha), divided between vineyards, olive groves, and woods. The winery is organically farmed, producing extra virgin olive oil, vinegar, and wine, particularly Chianti Classico.

== History ==
Italian printer and bookbinder Raffaello Stianti bought the Volpaia winery, which included a significant portion of the village, in 1966.

He gifted the entire property to his daughter Giovannella Stianti when she married Carlo Mascheroni in 1972. During the mid-1970s, they embarked on a mission to modernize the winery within the requirements of Italian law to preserve the external structure of the 11th-century village, which is protected by the government. They converted historical sites into cellars, offices, and apartments.

They were the first to employ temperature-controlled fermentation techniques. They installed stainless steel pipes concealed under the village's sidewalks to connect the winery's stainless-steel fermentation tanks in the upper village to various barrel cellars in the lower part without disturbing Volpaia's historic character, which Italian law forbids them from disturbing.

=== Vineyards, philosophies ===
The winery sits at one of the highest elevations of all the wineries in the Chianti area. It is committed to organic farming practices and complies with all the organic viticulture legislation for the production of wine.

=== Today ===
Castello de Volpaia cultivates 114 acres (0.46 km^{2}) of vineyards and nearly 40 acres (160,000 m^{2}) of olive trees. The winery also owns the two-thirds of the walled village, as well as villas, woods and forests. Many of the residents of the village work in connection with the winery.

Carlo and Giovannella Mascheroni Stianti co-owned and operated the winery for forty-five years, later assisted by son Nicolo (b. 1974) and daughter Federica (b. 1976.) Following Carlo's passing in 2017, Giovannella assumed full ownership of Volpaia, with Nicolo and Federica acting as proprietors.

== Winemaking at Volpaia ==
=== At the vineyard ===
Once picked, grapes are carried in boxes that never exceed 30–40 pounds each and delivered to the cellars within ten minutes. From these boxes are selected the grapes which will go into the riserva.

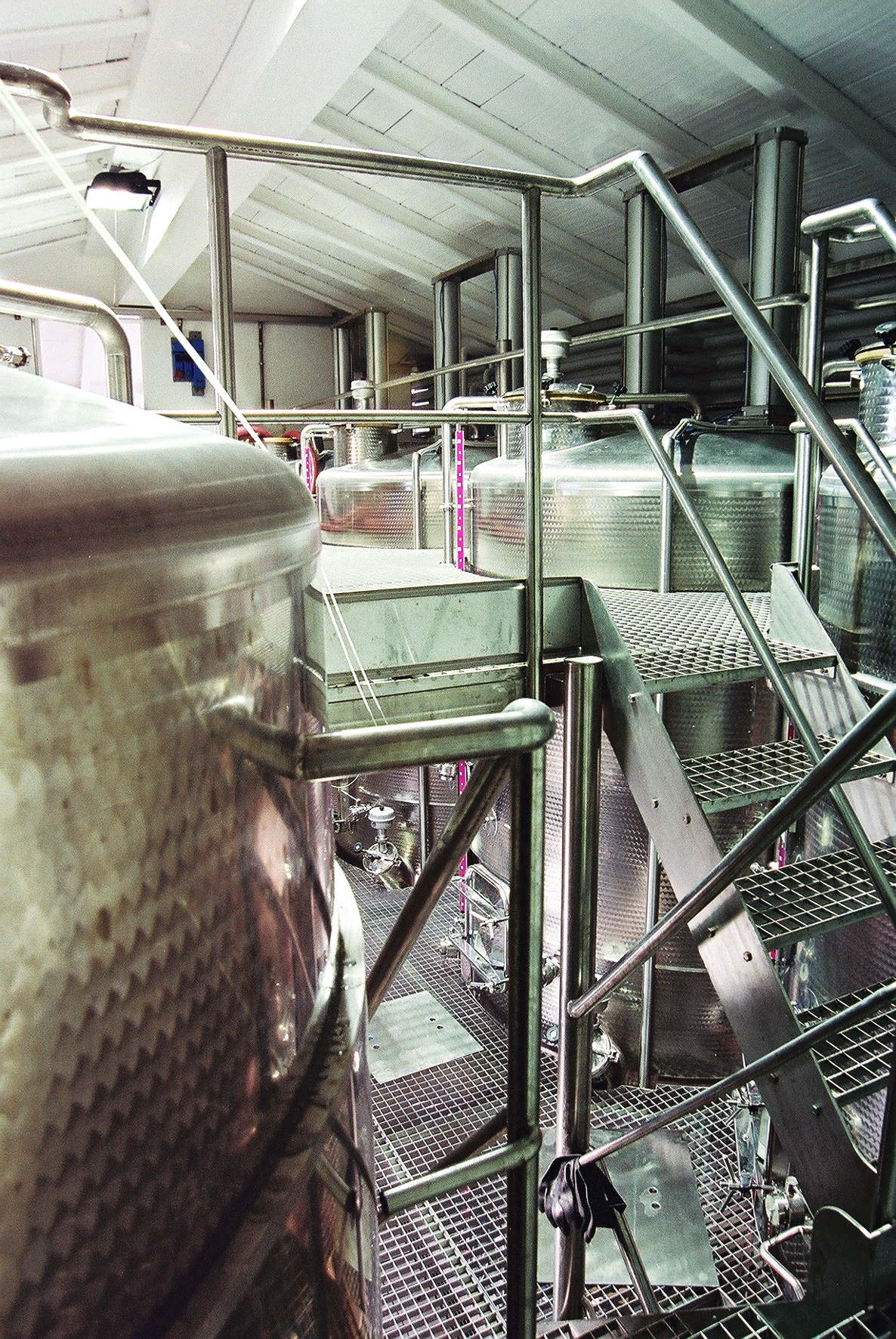
Two levels fermentation tanks

=== At the Winery ===
As soon as the grapes arrive at the winery, they are sorted and stems are removed. After this, they are pressed just enough to break the skins and immediately transferred into the upper tanks of temperature-controlled, stainless-steel vats which each contain an upper and lower tank. The upper tank chills the grapes to 46 °F (8 °C) for a two days. Fermentation begins after this when pistons atop each tank gently press the tank's cap from above to extract the juice from the must, which stays in the upper tank as the juice flows into the lower tank to finish the first fermentation.

=== Moving and aging ===
Once initial fermentation in the lower tank is complete, the wine is moved to the barrel cellars, all of which are located in historic buildings throughout the village. In order to follow the requirement of Italian law for them to protect the original buildings, Castello di Volpaia created an underground vinoduct—a labyrinth of stainless steel pipes hidden far beneath the streets of Volpaia—which transport the wine from tank in the upper village to the barrel cellars in the lower village. Depending on the wine, malolactic fermentation and aging occur in either 800-gallon oak casks or in 60-gallon oak barrels over twelve to twenty-four months.

== Tourism ==
Giovannella began conducting cooking classes in 2000. She also produces artisanal vinegar at a nearby farmhouse dedicated to that activity.

=== Art exhibitions ===
For 13 years until 1993, with the help of Luciano Pistoi, a famous Italian gallerist and art collector, Volpaia was the highlight of contemporary art in Italy. Piero Gilardi, Ardengo Soffici, Salvatore Scarpitta, John Long, Enzo Cucchi, Giulio Paolini, Giorgio Moranti, Alberto Burri, and many others showed in Volpaia their works.

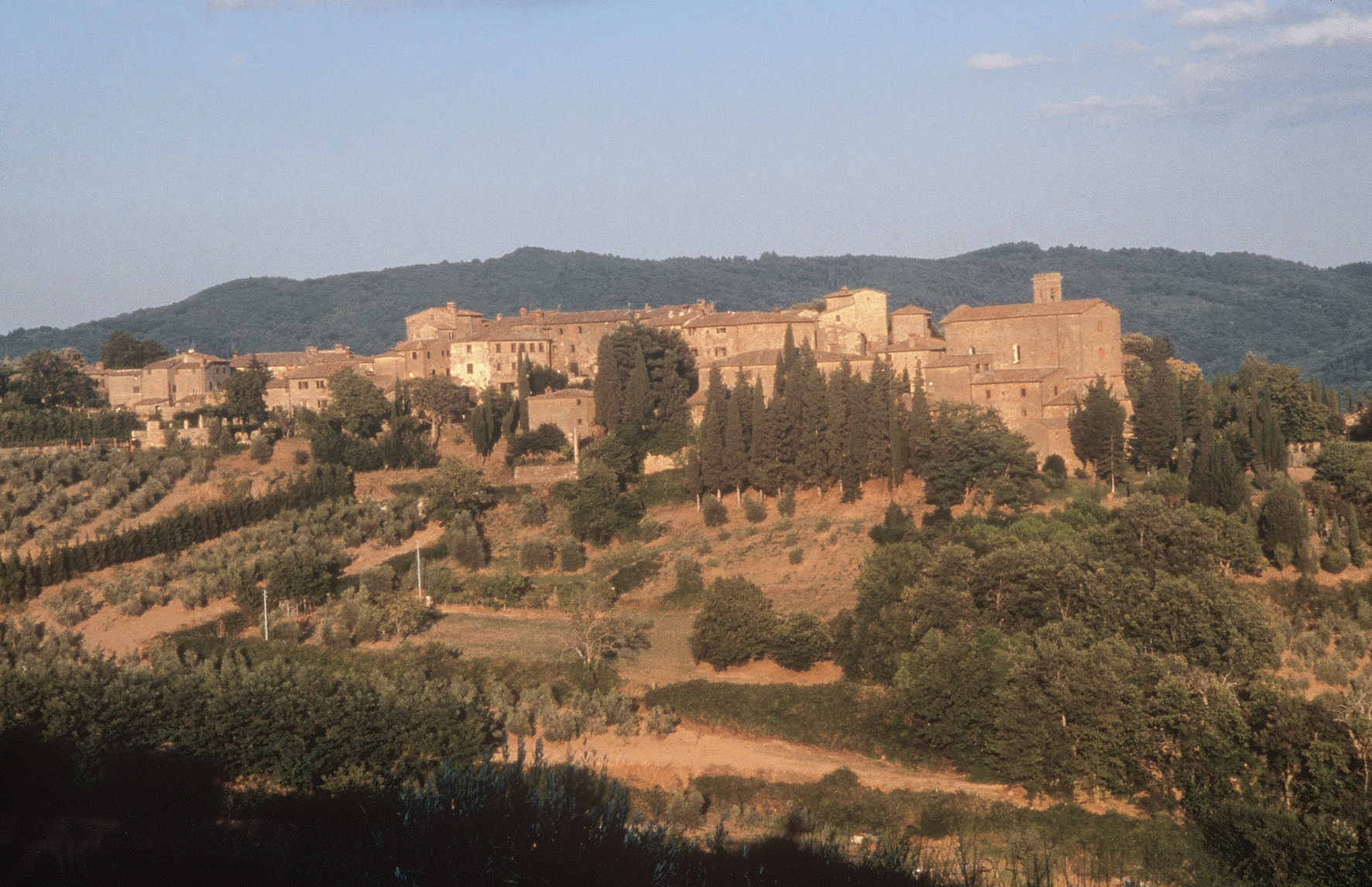
A view of Volpaia from the west

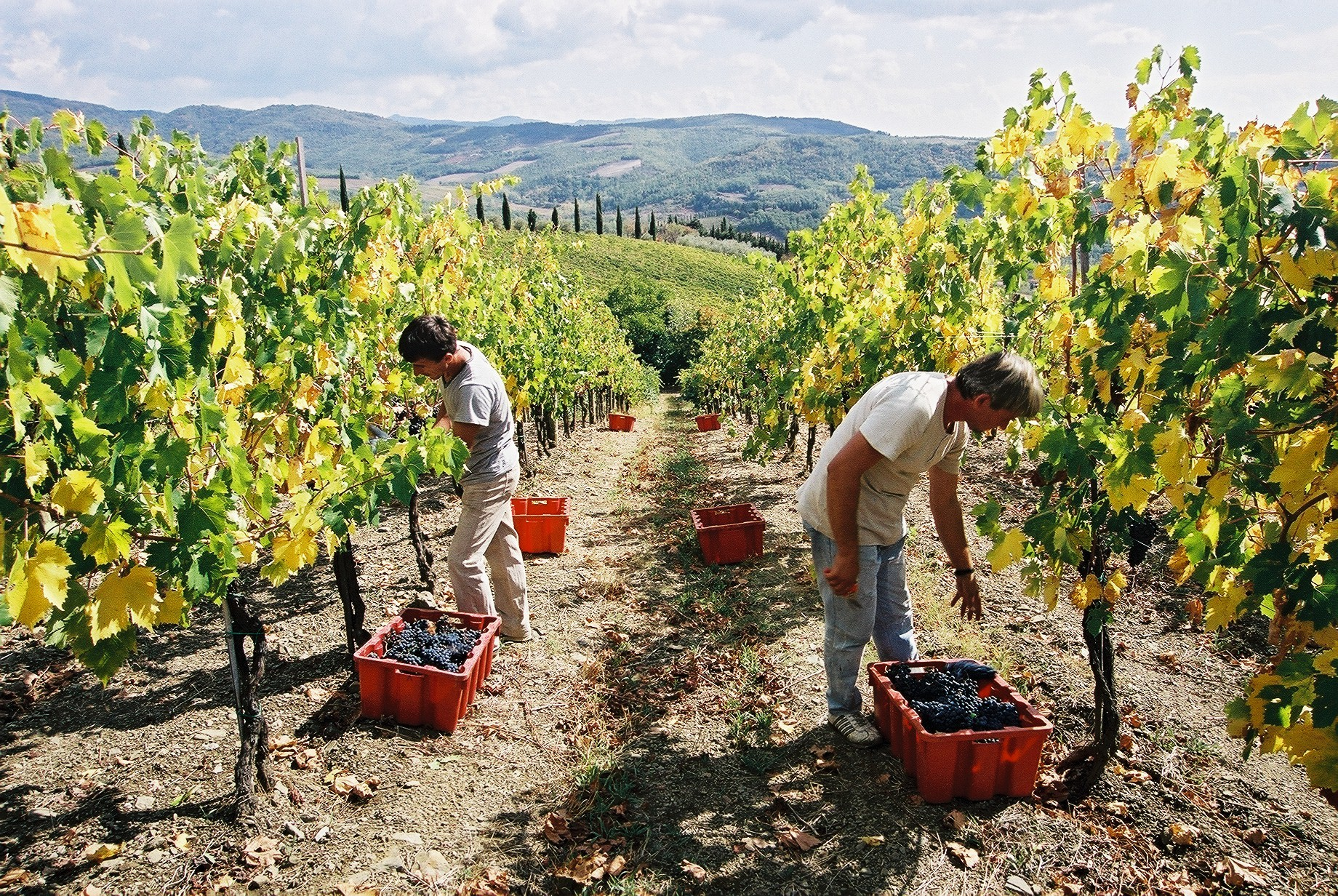
Harvest at Volpaia

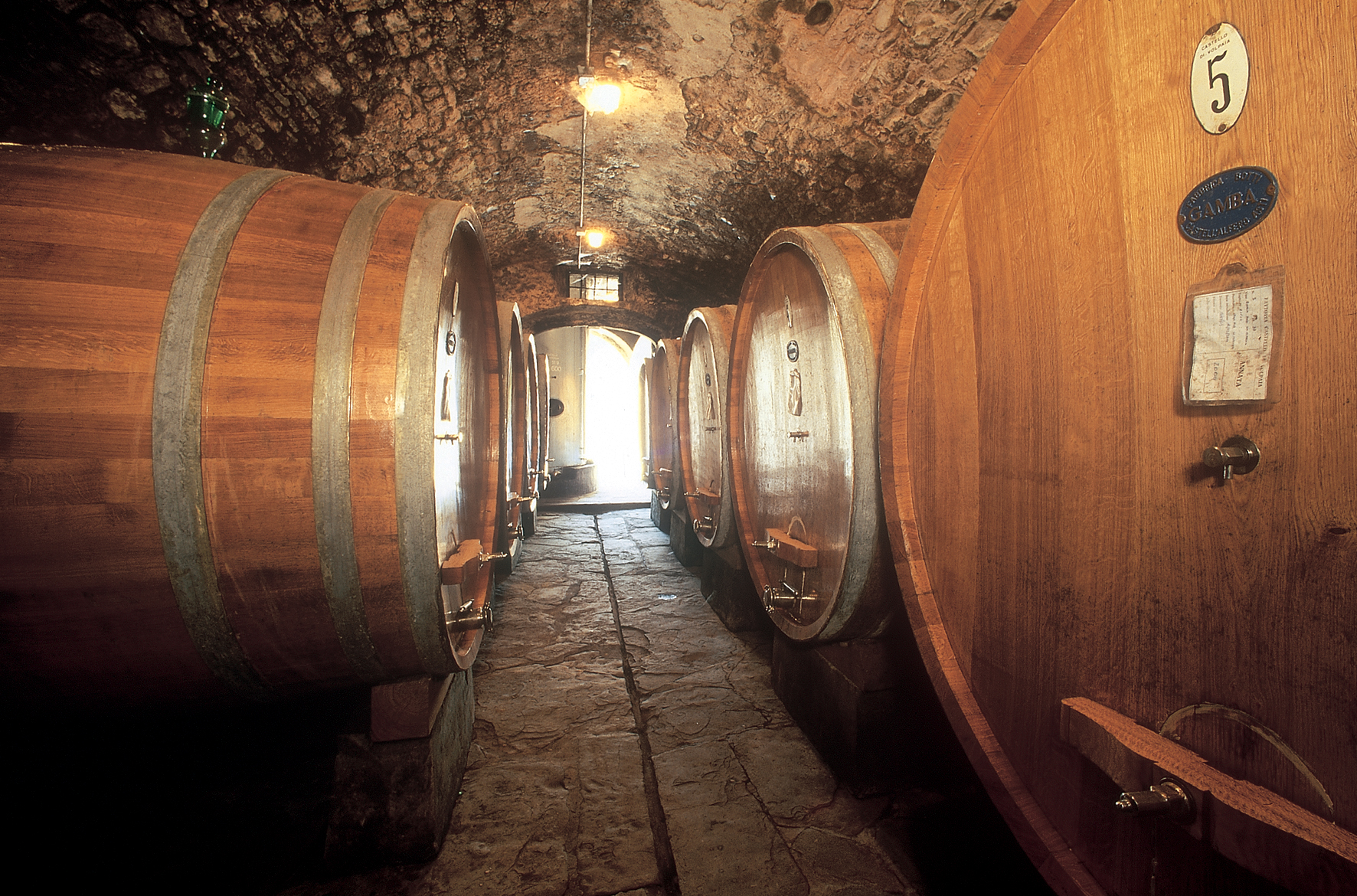
French Oak casks for aging Chianti Classico

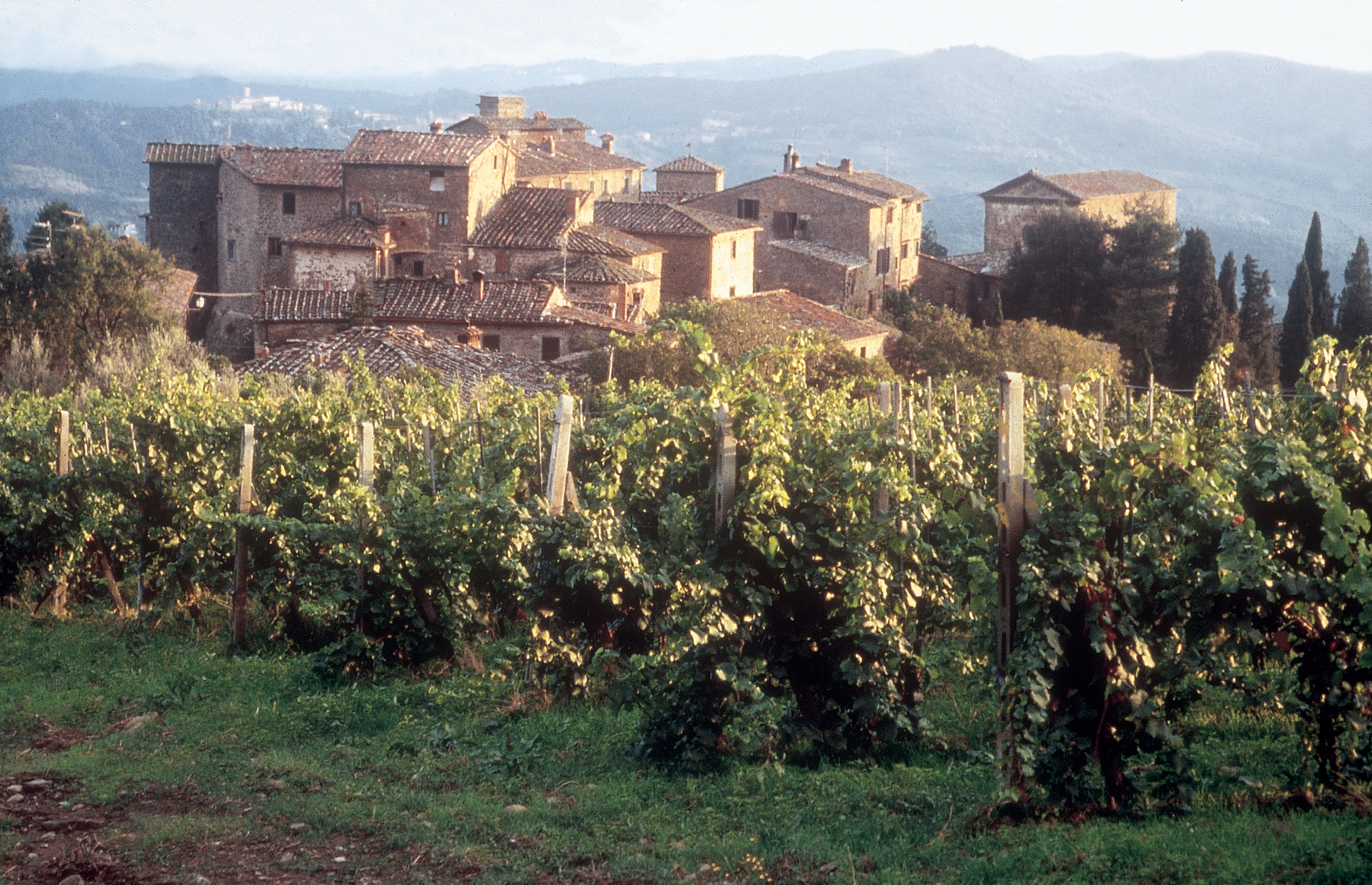
The village of Volpaia seen from the north

Castello de Volpaia
