= Selvole =

- Village
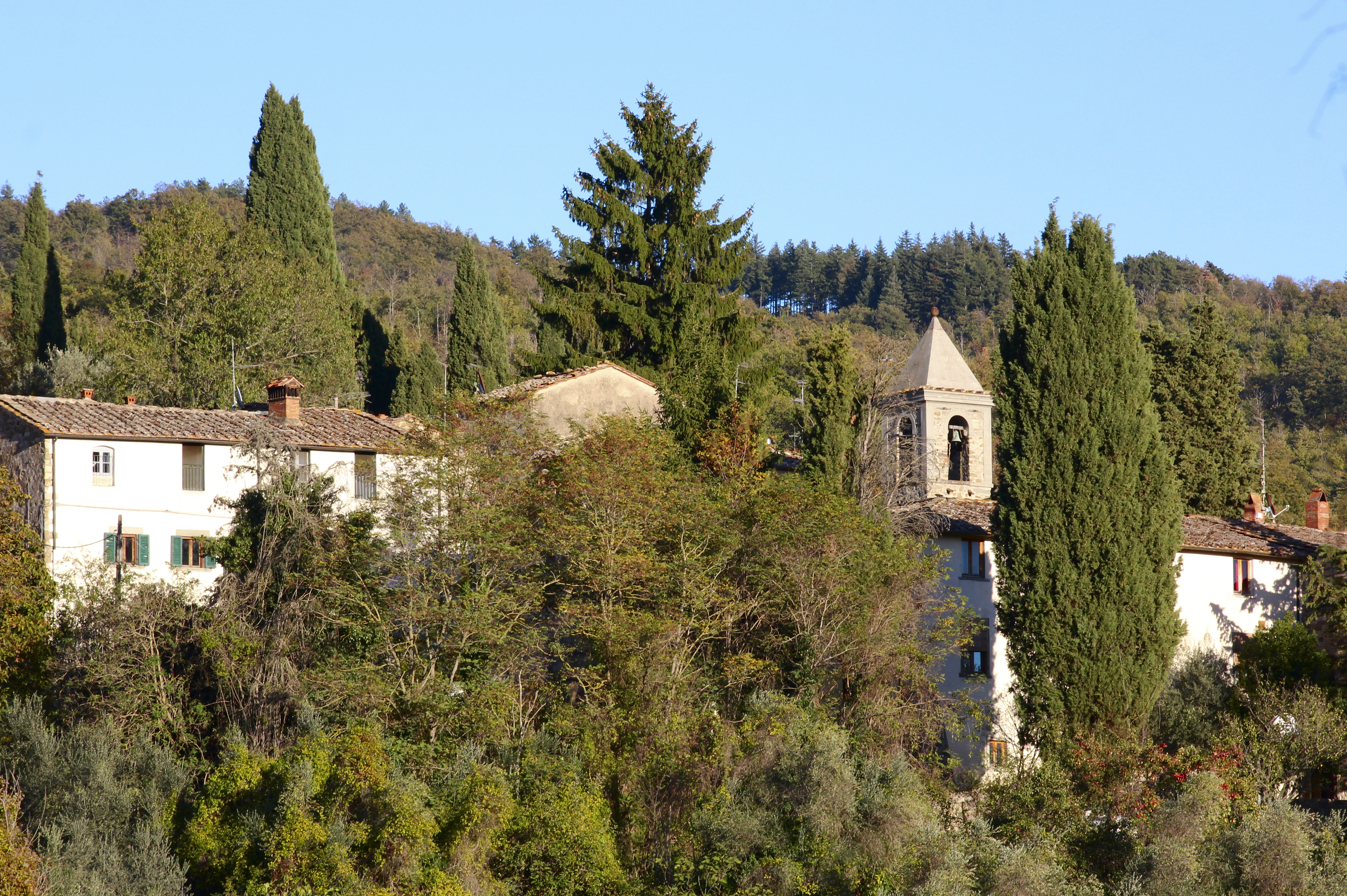

- Selvole
- Coordinates: 43.499114°N 11.416635°E
- Country: Italy
- Region: Tuscany
- Province: Siena (SI)
- Comune: Radda in Chianti
- Time zone: UTC+1 (CET)
  - Summer (DST): UTC+2 (CEST)

Selvole is a small village in the comune of Radda in Chianti, located within the Province of Siena, in Tuscany, Italy.

It was a former municipality from 1774 to 1823.
