= Colle Petroso =

- Frazione
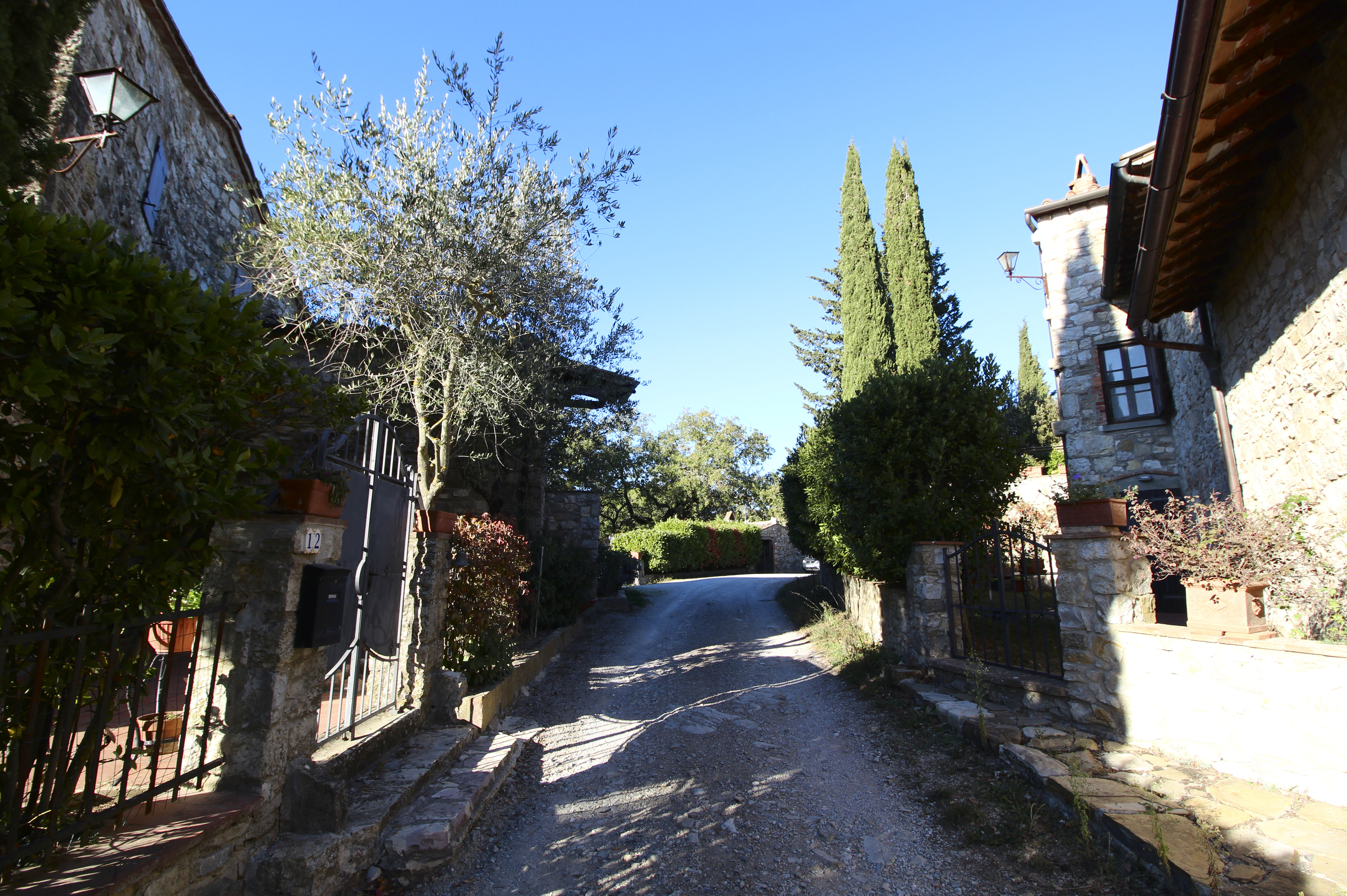

- Location of Colle Petroso in Italy
- Coordinates: 43°28′30″N 11°19′13″E
- Country: Italy
- Region: Tuscany
- Province: Siena (SI)
- Comune: Radda in Chianti
- Elevation: 520 m (1,710 ft)

Population (2011)
  - Total: 10
- Time zone: UTC+1 (CET)
  - Summer (DST): UTC+2 (CEST)

Colle Petroso is a village in Tuscany, central Italy, administratively a frazione of the comune of Radda in Chianti, province of Siena. At the time of the 2001 census its population was 18.

Colle Petroso is about 30 km from Siena and 9 km from Radda in Chianti.
