= San Fedele, Radda in Chianti =

San Fedele
- Frazione
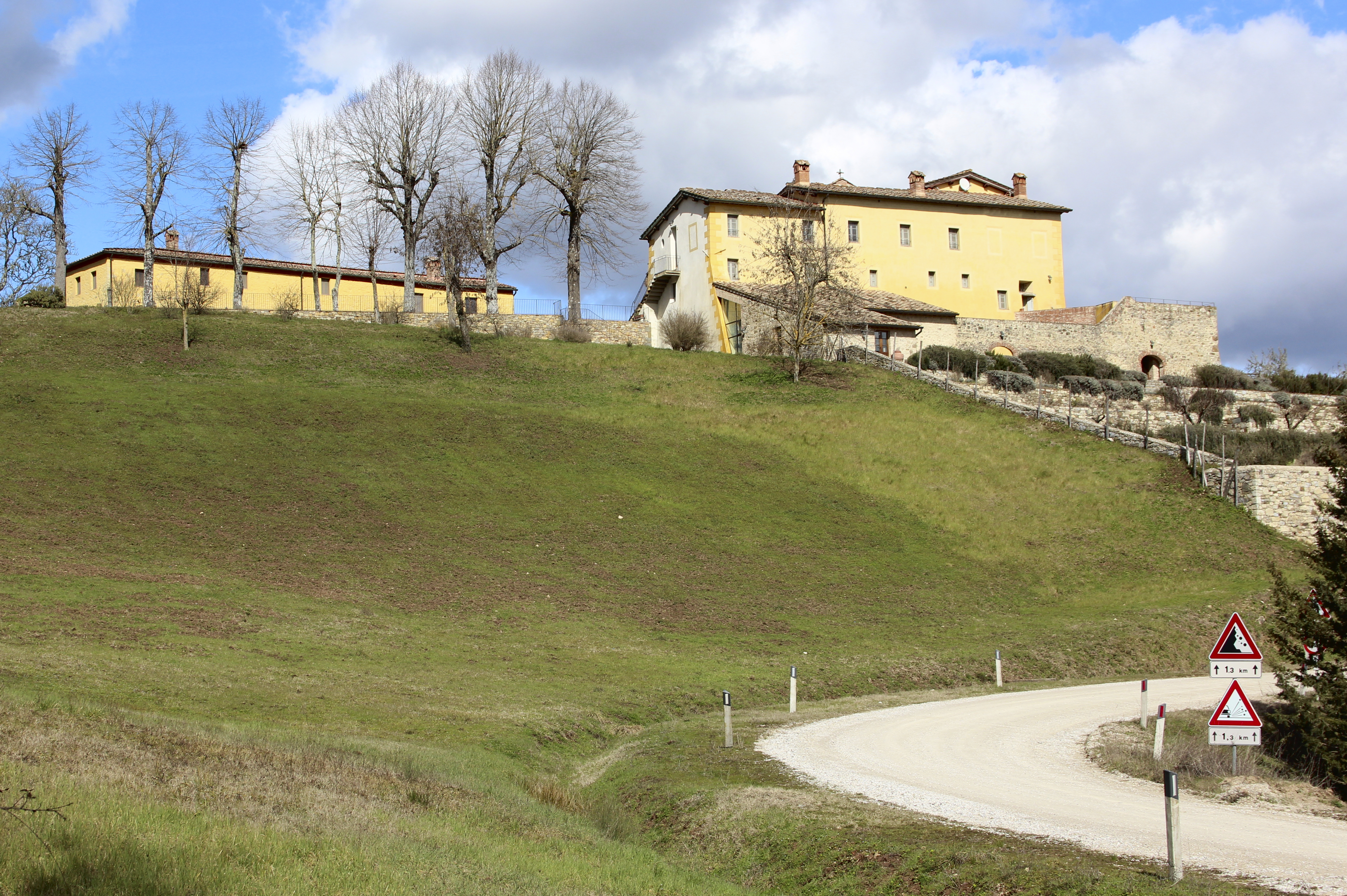
- View of San Fedele

- Location of San Fedele in Italy
- Coordinates: 43°26′19″N 11°20′55″E
- Country: Italy
- Region: Tuscany
- Province: Siena (SI)
- Comune: Radda in Chianti
- Elevation: 378 m (1,240 ft)
- Time zone: UTC+1 (CET)
  - Summer (DST): UTC+2 (CEST)

San Fedele is a village in Tuscany, central Italy, administratively a frazione of the comune of Radda in Chianti, province of Siena.

San Fedele is about 18 km from Siena and 10 km from Radda in Chianti.

== Bibliography ==
- Emanuele Repetti (1841). "Paterno del Chianti (San Fedele)". Dizionario geografico fisico storico della Toscana. Vol. 4. Florence. pp. 67–68. Archived from the original on 2017-10-12.
