= Monterinaldi =

- Frazione
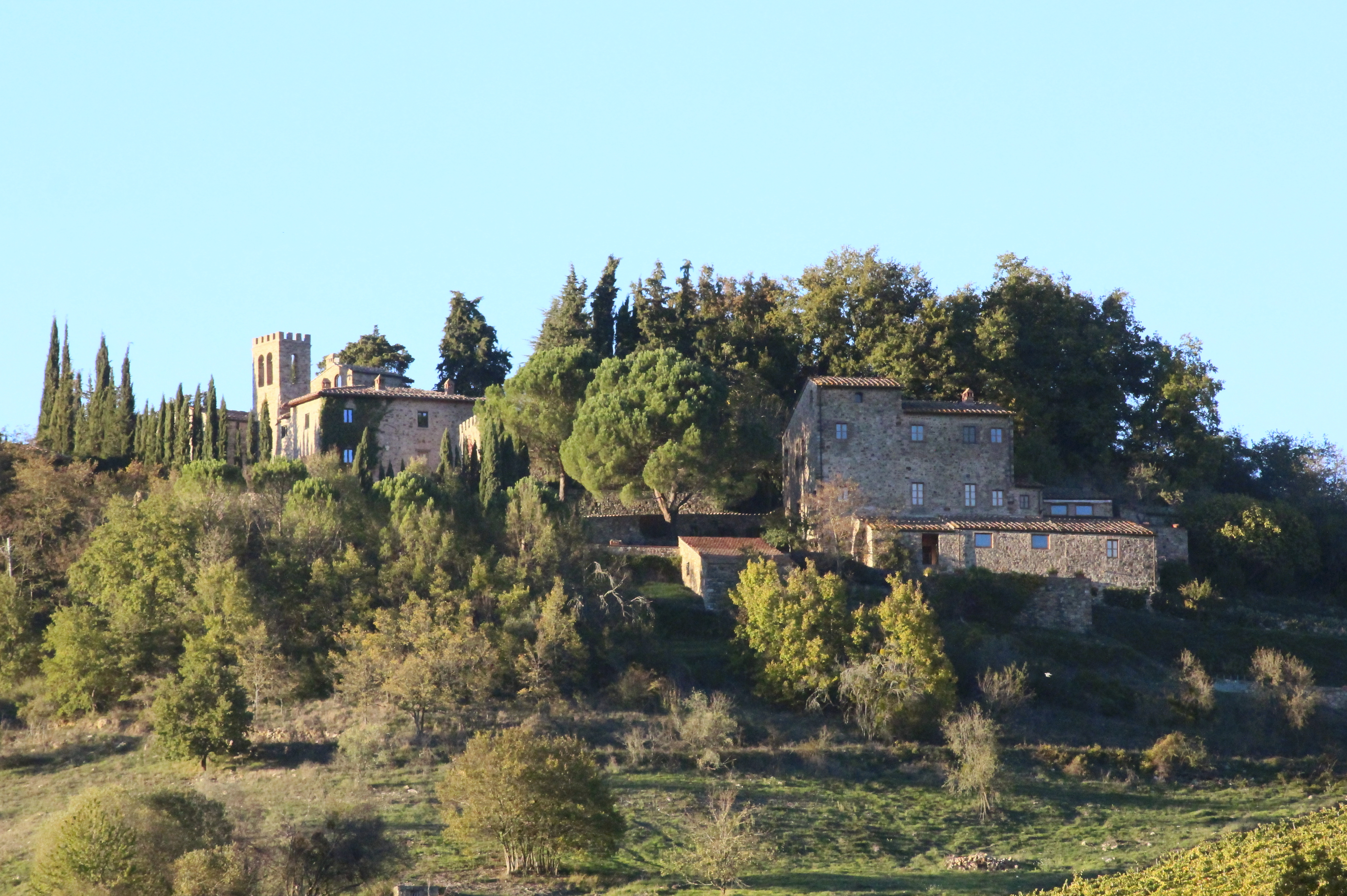
- View of Monterinaldi

- Location of Monterinaldi in Italy
- Coordinates: 43°30′42″N 11°19′34″E
- Country: Italy
- Region: Tuscany
- Province: Siena (SI)
- Comune: Radda in Chianti
- Elevation: 396 m (1,299 ft)
- Time zone: UTC+1 (CET)
  - Summer (DST): UTC+2 (CEST)

Monterinaldi is a village in Tuscany, central Italy, administratively a frazione of the comune of Radda in Chianti, province of Siena.

Monterinaldi is about 40 km from Siena and 5 km from Radda in Chianti.

== Bibliography ==
- Emanuele Repetti (1839). "Monterinaldi". Dizionario geografico fisico storico della Toscana. Vol. 3. Florence. pp. 504–506.
