= Anna Giacometti =

Swiss politician (born 1961)

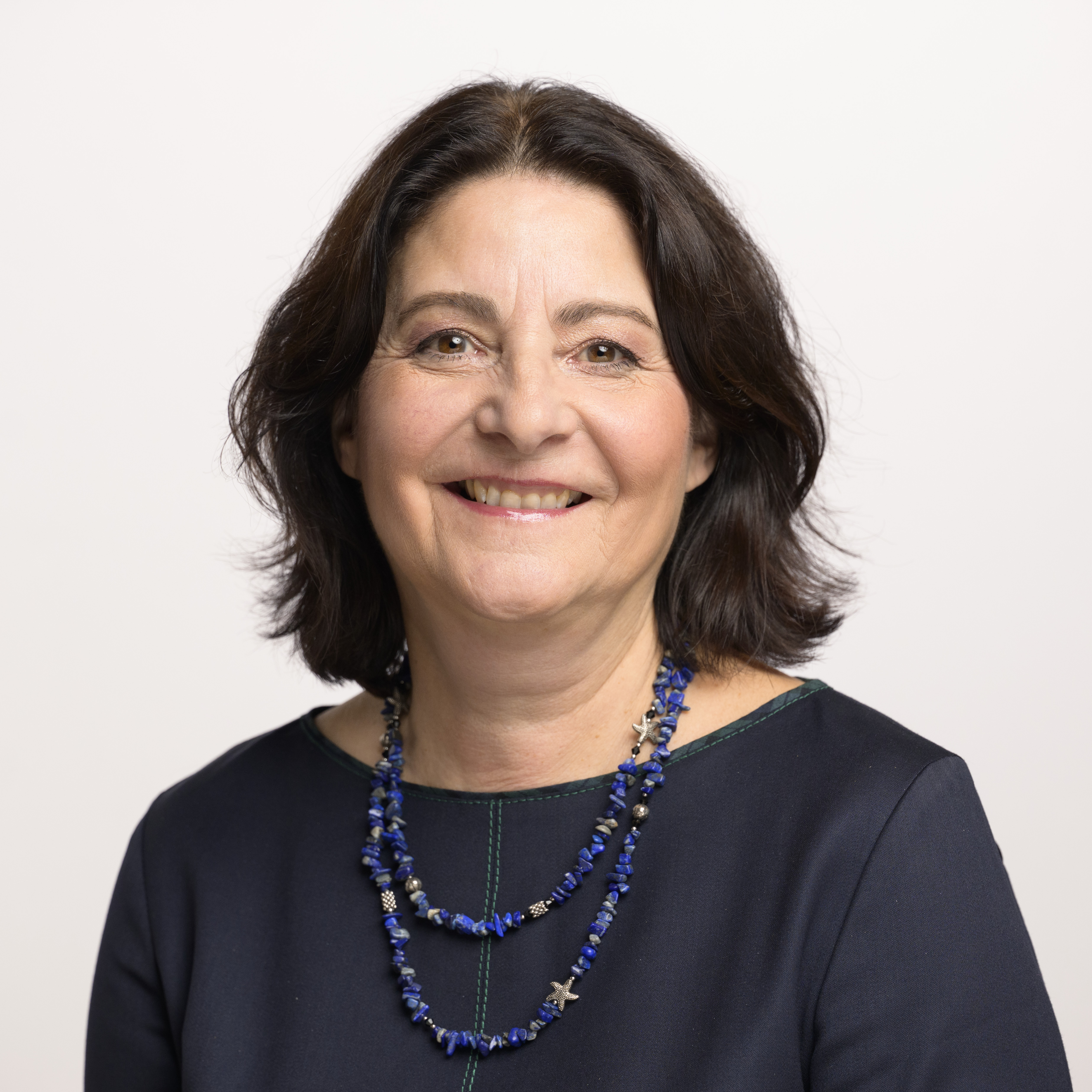

Member of the National Council (Switzerland)
- Incumbent
- Assumed office 2 December 2019
- Constituency: Canton of Grisons

Personal details
- Born: Anna Giacometti; 8 September 1961 (age 64) Samedan, Grisons, Switzerland
- Party: The Liberals
- Relations: Alberto Giacometti; Augusto Giacometti
- Children: 2
- Education: Lyceum Alpinum Zuoz
- Occupation: Politician, former foreign service officer

Anna Giacometti (born 8 September 1961) is a Swiss politician and former foreign service officer. She currently serves as a member of the National Council for The Liberals since 2019. She previously served as the first mayor of Bregaglia from 2010 to 2020, who gained national attention after the Bondo landslide, where she was responsible for the first aid and evacuation of its citizens.

== Early life and education ==
Giacometti was born on 8 September 1961 in Samedan, Switzerland. Her parents were from Val Bregaglia (Bergell) but primarily lived in Zurich before moving back to Grisons. Giacometti was primarily raised in Castasegna. She is a distant relative of Alberto Giacometti and Augusto Giacometti. Alberto was a maternal first cousin of her grandmother, and Augusto was a paternal cousin of her grandfather. She left her hometown in 1976, where she completed the Handelsschule at Lyceum Alpinum Zuoz. Subsequently, Giacometti spent one year in England, learning the language.

== Career ==
In 1981, Giacometti entered the Federal Department of Foreign Affairs, where, at the time, young people were hired and trained to work in Swiss embassies and consulates abroad. She completed the trainee program in Bern, and then was deployed to the Swiss Embassy in Lisbon, Portugal, becoming a foreign service officer. Later she worked for the Swiss Consulate General in Milan, Italy before returning to her home region Grisons, Switzerland.

Giacometti operated a small farm on her homestead for a mere seventeen years. Since 1 January 2010 she was the first president/mayor of the newly established town of Bregaglia, which merged from the former municipalities Bondo, Castasegna, Soglio, Stampa and Vicosoprano.

== Politics ==
Between 2010 and 2020, Giacometti served as president/mayor of the municipal council of the newly established municipality of Bregaglia. In the 2019 Swiss federal election, she was elected into National Council (Switzerland) for The Liberals. She assumed office on 2 December 2019. Giacometti also serves in the capacity of speaker for the Finance Commission.
