= Giovanni Andrea Scartazzini =

Italian-Swiss pastor and literary critic

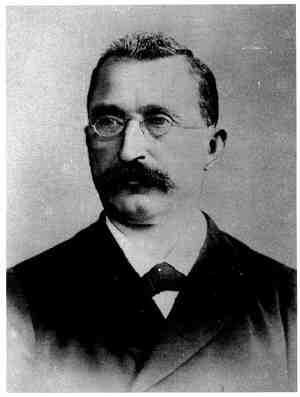
- Giovanni Andrea Scartazzini
- Born: 30 December 1837; Bondo, Switzerland
- Died: 10 February 1901 (aged 63); Fahrwangen, Switzerland
- Other names: Andreas Scartazzini, Johann Andreas Scartazzini, Scartazzini
- Occupations: Minister, writer

Giovanni Andrea Scartazzini was a Protestant pastor and Italian-Swiss literary critic, best known for his Italian annotated edition of the Divine Comedy and the other writings on its author, Dante Alighieri.

== Biography ==
Son of the notary Bartolomeo di Picenoni and Clara, he was born in Bondo, Switzerland, in the canton of Graubünden, on 30 December 1837. His childhood was marked by an early passion for two books: the Bible, the essential book in every Protestant Christian family, and the Divine Comedy, which he had received as a gift from his godfather. He studied at the Institute of Evangelical Missions at Basel where he joined the liberal theological trends, completing his theological studies at Bern.

=== Activities ===
He served as a minister in several Swiss cities, including Soglio in the Valley of Bergell. He had to give up this ministry due to his highly controversial nature and his criticism of the Reformed Church of his time, which was frontally attacked in his writings, just as he did against the critics of his work as literary scholar on Dante and the Divine Comedy.

He reached international fame due to his literary activity, which culminated in 1869 with the publication of a study about the life, the epoch, and the work of Dante Alighieri, and the subsequent annotated edition of Dante's Divine Comedy in four volumes, the first of which was published in 1874 and the last in 1890. This work, in an edition reviewed and expanded by Giuseppe Vandelli in Milan in 1893, still remains a fundamental text.

His fighting soul in the persistent defense of his convictions was, of course, enhanced by the cultural contexts in which he lived. These contexts were so far apart. On one hand, Scartazzini lived under the liberal Swiss Protestant theology, and on the other hand, under the environment of the Italian classic literature. Despite the strong influence of both contexts on his life, he never yielded to the temptation to draw a bridge between them.

In 1871-1874 he taught Italian at the cantonal school of Chur. He was also the director of the "New International Journal of Florence". In 1884, as a result of the conflicts raised by his fighting spirit, he permanently left Bergell and settled in Fahrwangen in the canton of Aargau, Switzerland, which would be his last pastoral office, where he died at the age of 63 on 10 February 1901.

In Acilia, a district close to Rome, Scartazzini is honored by a street named for him, while in Bondo, the municipality has placed a commemorative stone at his own home.

In one of his sermons he expressed a thought that is valid in every time and in every nation: “A people who care about what it takes to have peace have laid a firmer and safer foundation for their own good ... May our people and our homeland recognize in time what it takes to have peace.”

=== Marriages ===
On 21 December 1862 in Bergamo he married his first wife, Anna Maria Caterina Baebler (1841-1883 ca.), daughter of Anna Maddalena Hoesli (1807–1870) and Ulrich Baebler (1798–1878), director of the weaving company which belonged to his father-in-law Gaspare Hoesli (1773–1857) from St. Bartholomew in Brescia.

His second wife was Maria Sophia Lehnen from Twann.

== Works ==
- La Divina Commedia riveduta nel testo e commentata, 4 vols., 1874–1890.
- Enciclopedia dantesca, 2 vols., 1896–1899.
