= Stampa =

- Former municipality
- Coat of arms
- Location of Stampa
- Location within Switzerland Location within Canton of Graubünden
- Coordinates: 46°20′N 9°35′E
- Country: Switzerland
- Canton: Graubünden
- District: Maloja

Area
  - Total: 94.74 km^{2} (36.58 sq mi)
- Elevation: 994 m (3,261 ft)

Population (December 2008)
  - Total: 595
  - Density: 6.28/km^{2} (16.3/sq mi)
- Time zone: UTC+01:00 (CET)
  - Summer (DST): UTC+02:00 (CEST)
- Postal code: 7605
- SFOS number: 3775
- ISO 3166 code: CH-GR
- Surrounded by: Bivio, Bondo, Chiesa in Valmalenco (IT-SO), Sils im Engadin/Segl, Soglio, Val Masino (IT-SO), Vicosoprano
- Website: SFSO statistics

Stampa is a former municipality in the Maloja district of the Swiss canton, Graubünden. It is now part of the municipality of Bregaglia.

== History ==
Stampa is first mentioned after 1354 as Stamppa and was named so in honor of the Stampa family, overlords of the area.

== Geography ==
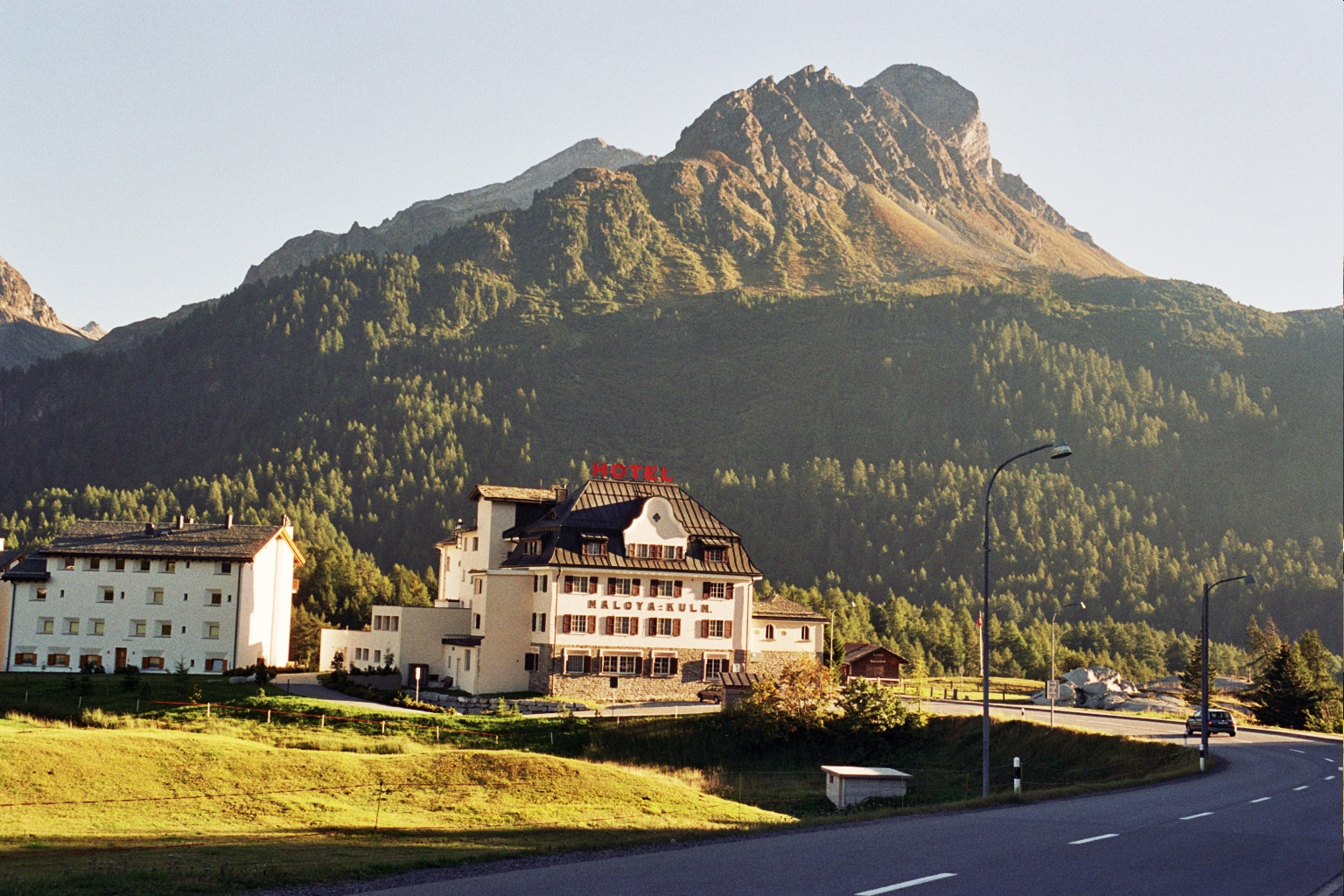
Maloja Pass and Hotel Kulm

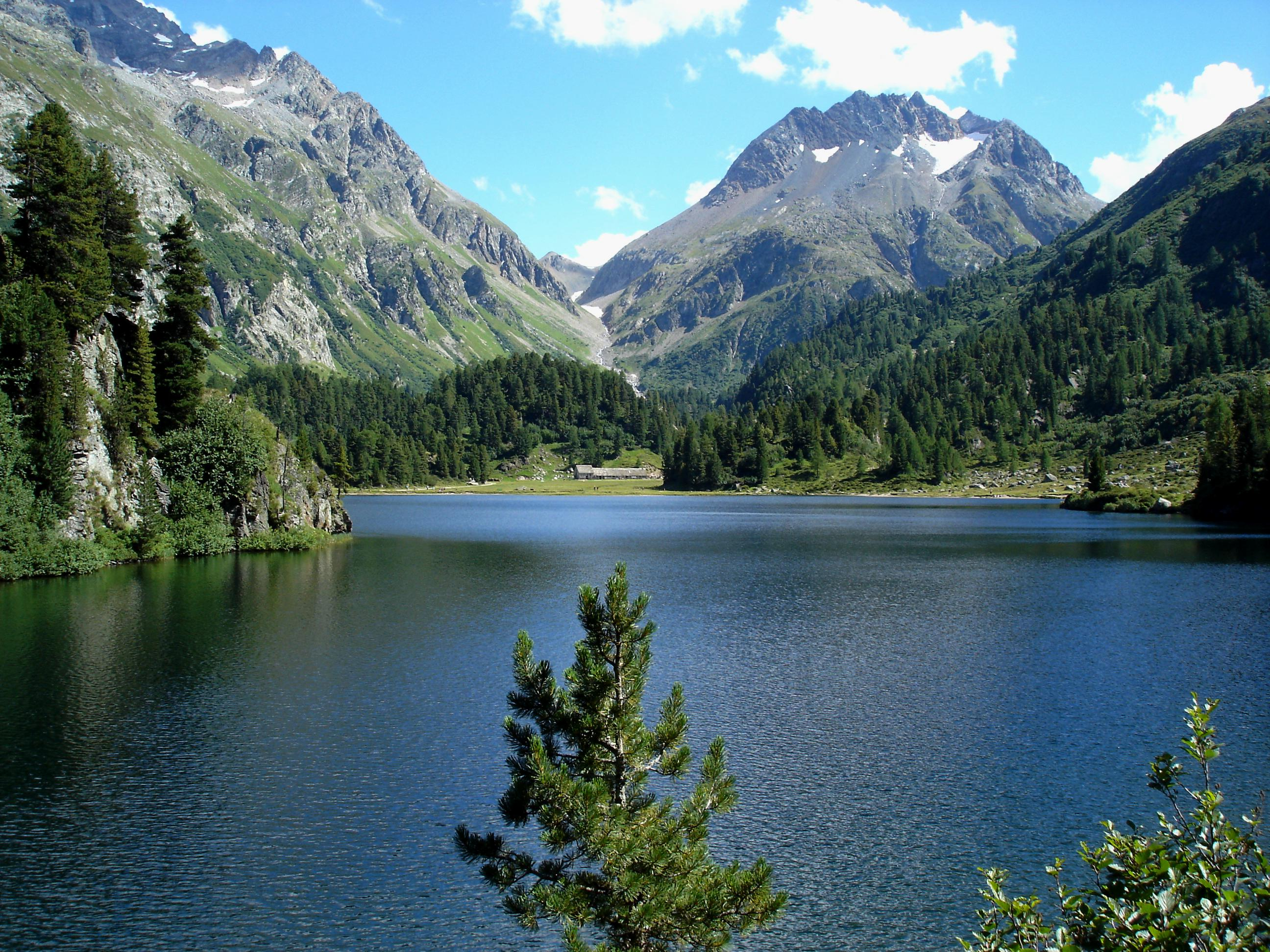
Lägh da Cavloc

Stampa has an area, as of 2006, of 94.7 km^{2} (36.6 sq mi). Of this area, 14.2% is used for agricultural purposes, while 18.8% is forested. Of the rest of the land, 0.8% is settled (buildings or roads) and the remainder (66.1%) is non-productive (rivers, glaciers or mountains).

The municipality is located in the Bergell sub-district of the Maloja district and is the administrative and cultural center of the sub-district. The municipality is divided into two distinct territories, the smaller in the Val Bregaglia and the larger which extends from the two sides of the Maloja Pass and Engadin.

It consists of the valley settlements of Stampa, Borgonovo, Coltura, Montaccio, Caccior (at an elevation of 1,000 m (3,300 ft)), Cavril and Canova at the foot of the Maloja Pass (at 1,600 m (5,200 ft)) and the sections of Maloja with Isola, Orden, Pila and Capolago (at 1,810 m (5,940 ft)).

On 1 January 2010 the municipalities of Bondo, Castasegna, Soglio, Stampa, and Vicosoprano merged into a new municipality of Bregaglia.

Lägh da Cavloc is located in the Val Forno.

== Demographics ==
Stampa has a population (as of 2008) of 595, of which 14.5% are foreign nationals. Over the last 10 years the population has decreased at a rate of -2.6%.

As of 2000, the gender distribution of the population was 48.4% male and 51.6% female. The age distribution, as of 2000, in Stampa is; 65 children or 12.2% of the population are between 0 and 9 years old. 40 teenagers or 7.5% are 10 to 14, and 21 teenagers or 4.0% are 15 to 19. Of the adult population, 41 people or 7.7% of the population are between 20 and 29 years old. 70 people or 13.2% are 30 to 39, 84 people or 15.8% are 40 to 49, and 71 people or 13.4% are 50 to 59. The senior population distribution is 69 people or 13.0% of the population are between 60 and 69 years old, 44 people or 8.3% are 70 to 79, there are 23 people or 4.3% who are 80 to 89, and there are 3 people or 0.6% who are 90 to 99.

In the 2007 federal election the most popular party was the SVP which received 57.2% of the vote. The next three most popular parties were the SP (22.5%), the FDP (16.2%) and the CVP (2.6%).

The entire Swiss population is generally well educated. In Stampa about 65% of the population (between age 25-64) have completed either non-mandatory upper secondary education or additional higher education (either University or a Fachhochschule).

Stampa has an unemployment rate of 1.71%. As of 2005, there were 24 people employed in the primary economic sector and about 8 businesses involved in this sector. 64 people are employed in the secondary sector and there are 11 businesses in this sector. 191 people are employed in the tertiary sector, with 42 businesses in this sector.

The historical population is given in the following table:

year	population
1850	328
1900	445
1950	414
2000	531

== Languages ==
Most of the population (as of 2000) speaks Italian (66.1%), with German being second most common (27.7%) and Romansh being third ( 1.9%). However, because a portion of the municipality lies in the Engadin valley and a part lies in the Val Bregaglia, there are also German and Romansh minorities.

Languages in Stampa GR
Languages	Census 1980		Census 1990		Census 2000	
Languages	Number	Percent	Number	Percent	Number	Percent
German	66	15.71%	139	28.48%	147	27.68%
Romansh	21	5.00%	12	2.46%	10	1.88%
Italian	317	75.48%	319	65.37%	351	66.10%
Population	420	100%	488	100%	531	100%

== Famous people ==
One family of famous artists, the Giacometti, come from Stampa. The most famous members of the family are:

- Giovanni Giacometti (1868–1933)
- Augusto Giacometti (1877–1947), cousin of Giovanni
- Alberto Giacometti (1901–1966), son of Giovanni
- Diego Giacometti (1902–1985), son of Giovanni
- Bruno Giacometti (1907-2012), son of Giovanni.

Another famous figure is the Basel-born artist Miriam Cahn, who has been residing in Stampa since 2016. She lives and works in an atelier house built by local architect Armando Ruinelli.

== Heritage sites of national significance ==
Palazzo Castelmur is listed as a Swiss heritage site of national significance.

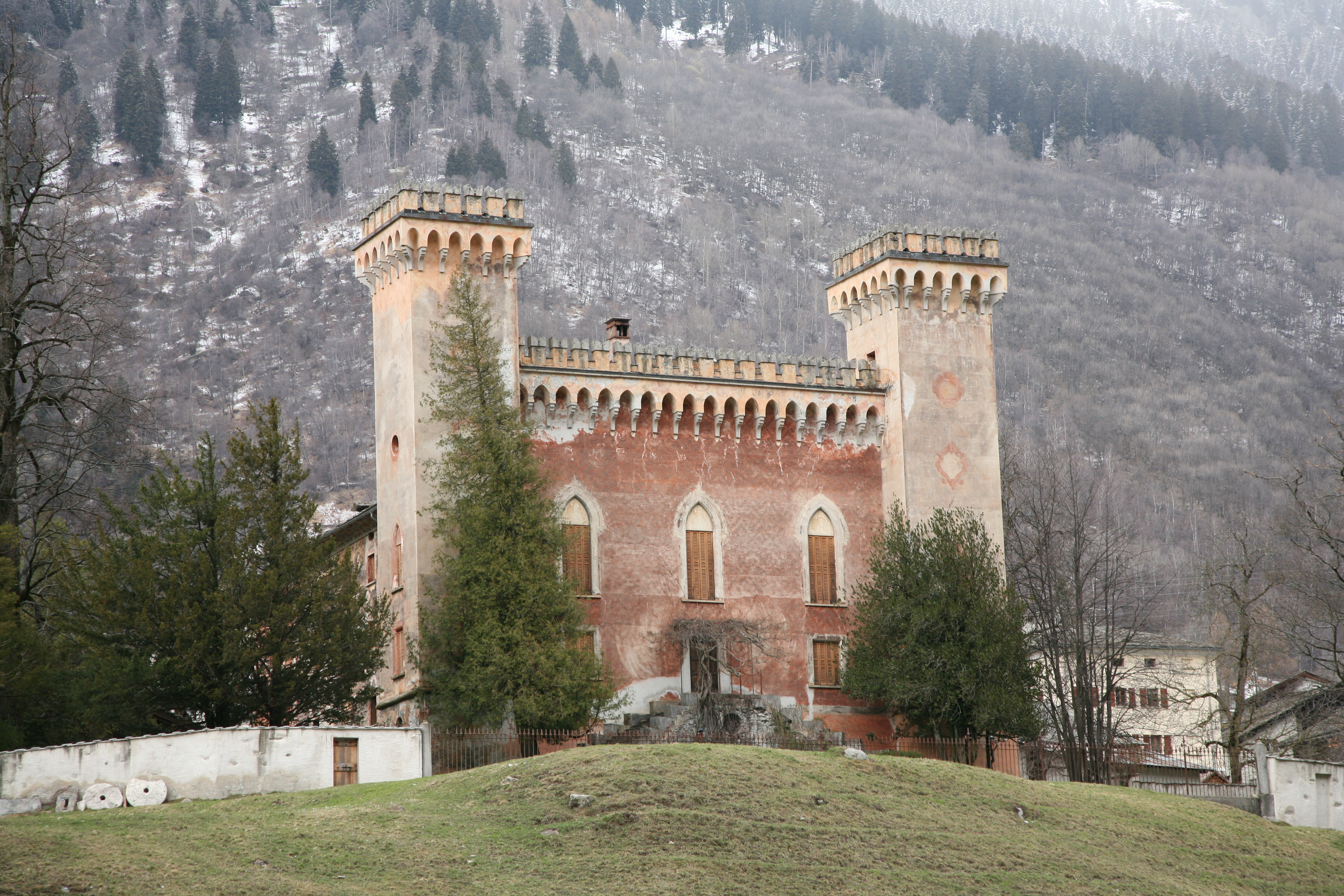
Palazzo Castelmur

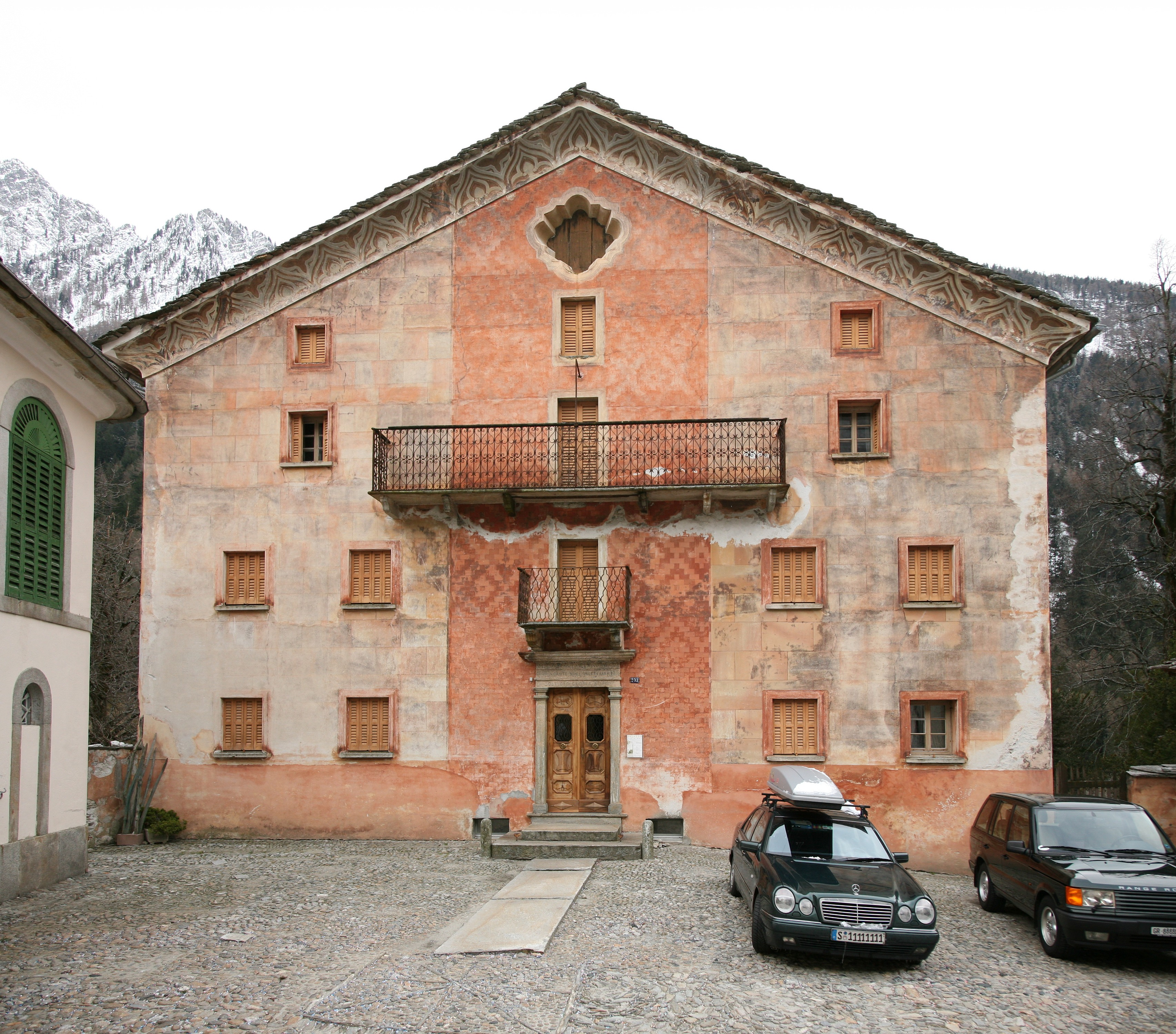
Back side of Palazzo Castelmur
