= Castasegna =

- Former municipality
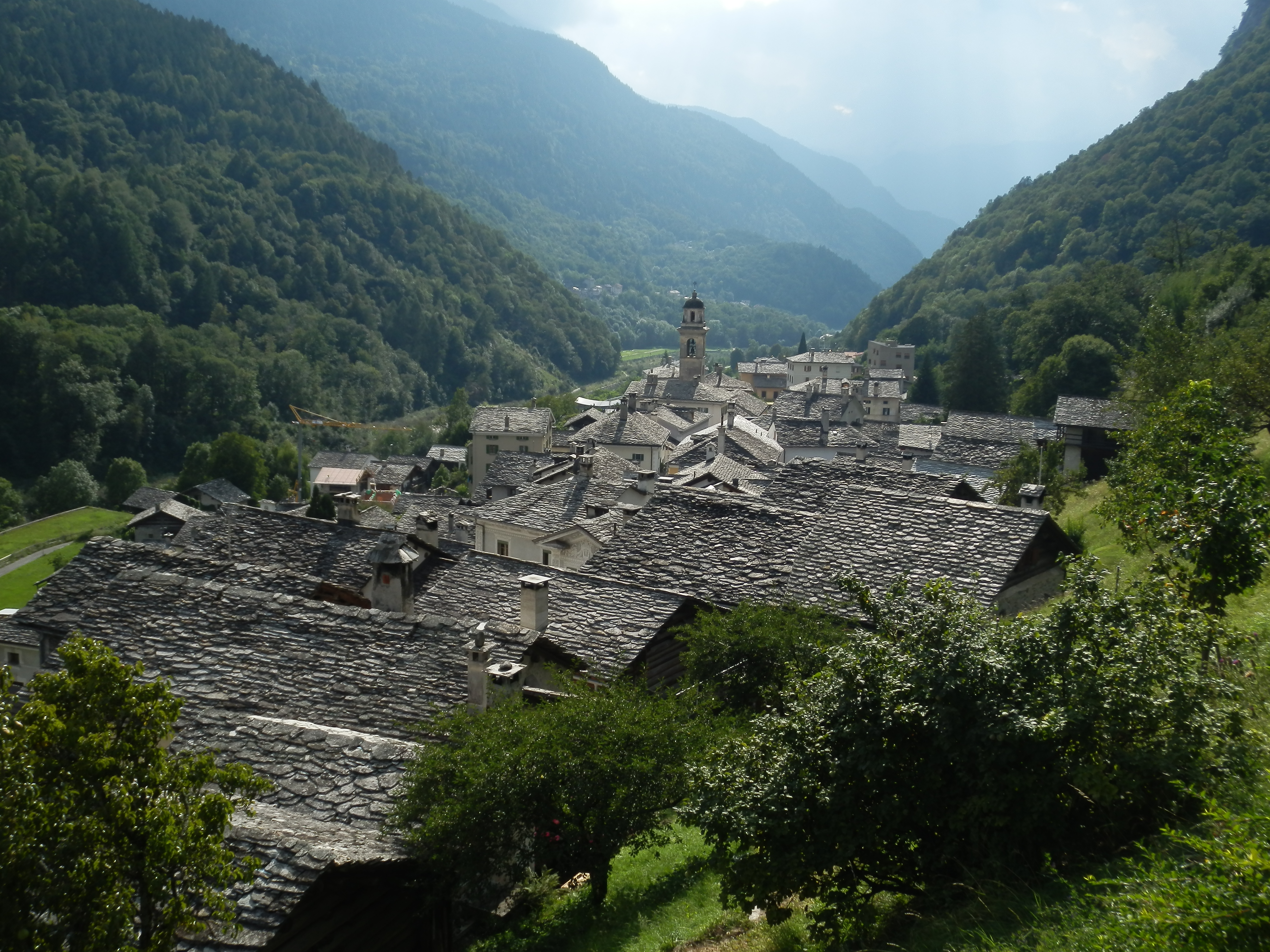
- Castasegna village

- Coat of arms
- Location of Castasegna
- Location within Switzerland Location within Canton of Graubünden
- Coordinates: 46°20′N 9°31′E
- Country: Switzerland
- Canton: Graubünden
- District: Maloja

Area
  - Total: 6.76 km^{2} (2.61 sq mi)
- Elevation: 696 m (2,283 ft)

Population (December 2008)
  - Total: 191
  - Density: 28.3/km^{2} (73.2/sq mi)
- Time zone: UTC+01:00 (CET)
  - Summer (DST): UTC+02:00 (CEST)
- Postal code: 7608
- SFOS number: 3773
- ISO 3166 code: CH-GR
- Surrounded by: Bondo, Soglio, Villa di Chiavenna (IT-SO)
- Website: SFSO statistics

Castasegna ([kɐʃtɐˈzeɲɐ]) is a former municipality in the district of Maloja in the Swiss canton of Grisons, on the Italian border. It is currently part of the municipality of Bregaglia. The town is situated in the Bergell valley, above the river Mera.

== History ==
Castasegna is first mentioned in 1374 as Castexegnia.

== Geography ==
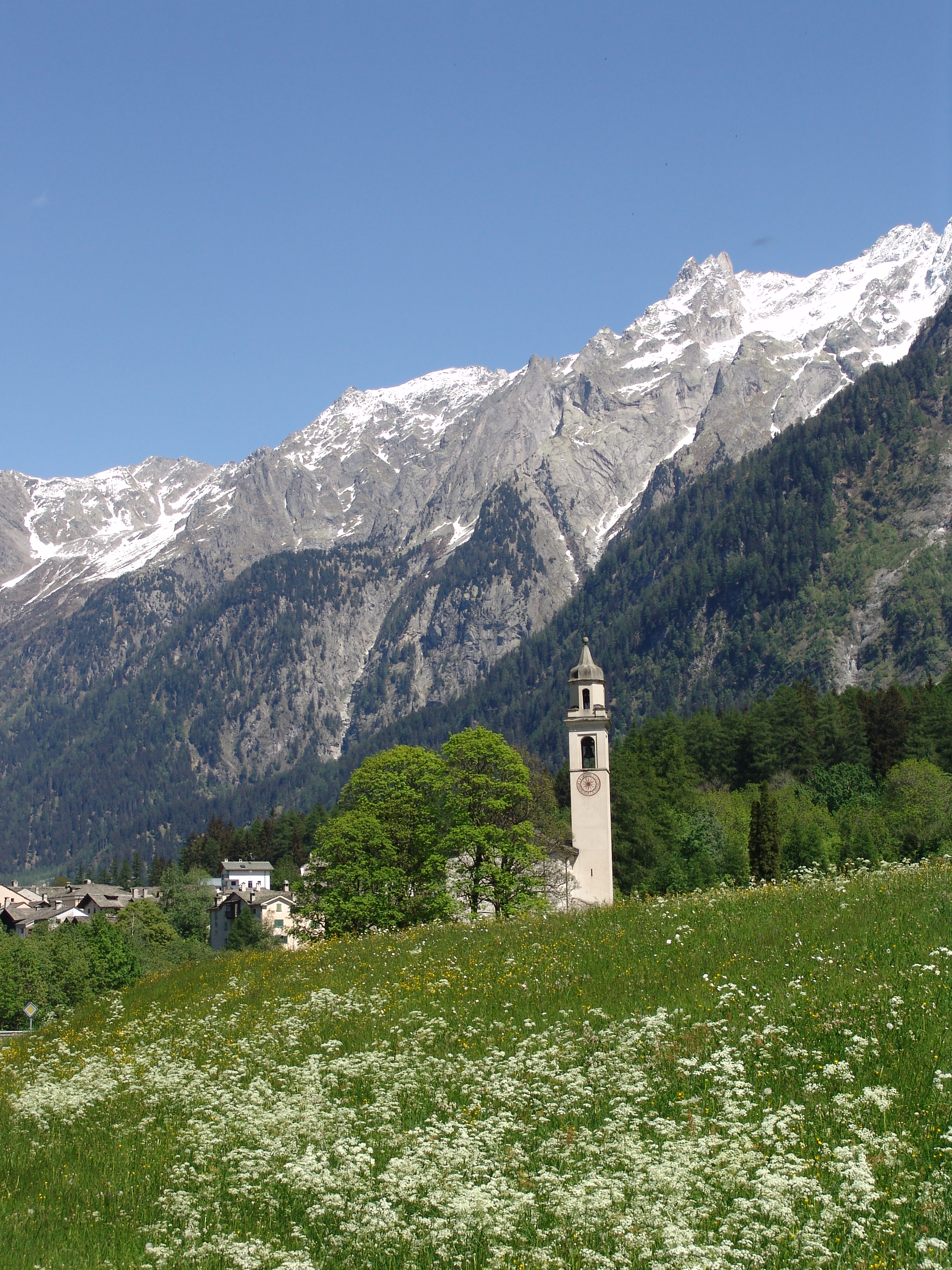
Castasegna

Castasegna has an area, as of 2006, of 6.8 km^{2} (2.6 sq mi). Of this area, 19.2% is used for agricultural purposes, while 40.1% is forested. Of the rest of the land, 2.1% is settled (buildings or roads) and the remainder (38.6%) is non-productive (rivers, glaciers or mountains).

The municipality is located in the Bergell sub-district of the Maloja district in the lower section of the Bergell valley. It consists of the linear village of Castasegna with the Italian border on the edge of town and the neighboring Italian village of Villa di Chiavenna nearby. The main highway in the valley used to run through the main, narrow street. In order to relieve the town of the congestion, the highway was moved just below, along the valley floor.

On 1 January 2010 the municipalities of Bondo, Castasegna, Soglio, Stampa, and Vicosoprano merged into a new municipality of as Bregaglia.

== Demographics ==
Castasegna has a population (as of 2008) of 191, of which 8.4% are foreign nationals. Over the last 10 years the population has decreased at a rate of -11.8%.

As of 2000, the gender distribution of the population was 46.4% male and 53.6% female. The age distribution, as of 2000, in Castasegna is; 20 children or 10.5% of the population are between 0 and 9 years old. 20 teenagers or 10.5% are 10 to 14, and 6 teenagers or 3.2% are 15 to 19. Of the adult population, 10 people or 5.3% of the population are between 20 and 29 years old. 41 people or 21.6% are 30 to 39, 28 people or 14.7% are 40 to 49, and 16 people or 8.4% are 50 to 59. The senior population distribution is 19 people or 10.0% of the population are between 60 and 69 years old, 18 people or 9.5% are 70 to 79, there are 9 people or 4.7% who are 80 to 89, and there are 3 people or 1.6% who are 90 to 99.

In the 2007 federal election the most popular party was the SP which received 46.9% of the vote. The next three most popular parties were the SVP (29.9%), the FDP (18.5%) and the CVP (4.7%).

In Castasegna about 70.9% of the population (between age 25–64) have completed either non-mandatory upper secondary education or additional higher education (either University or a Fachhochschule).

Castasegna has an unemployment rate of 0.69%. As of 2005, there were 14 people employed in the primary economic sector and about 5 businesses involved in this sector. 34 people are employed in the secondary sector and there are 5 businesses in this sector. 64 people are employed in the tertiary sector, with 18 businesses in this sector.

The historical population is given in the following table:

year	population
1850	207
1900	239
1910	261
1950	197
1980	174
2000	190

== Languages ==
Most of the population (as of 2000) speaks Italian (80.0%), with German being second most common (15.8%) and Romansh being third ( 3.2%). Traditionally, the Italian spoken in Castasegna is a Lombard dialect. Since the early 20th Century the municipality had a German-speaking minority.

Languages in Castasegna GR
Languages	Census 1980		Census 1990		Census 2000	
Languages	Number	Percent	Number	Percent	Number	Percent
German	44	25.29%	41	23.30%	30	15.79%
Romansh	14	8.05%	9	5.11%	6	3.16%
Italian	115	66.09%	126	71.59%	152	80.00%
Population	174	100%	176	100%	190	100%

== Industry ==
Elektrizitätswerk der Stadt Zürich (EWZ) operates a power plant in Castasegna.

== Sights ==
Castasegna has the largest Chestnut forest in Europe, known as Brentan. The town's name means chestnut grove and the tree is featured on the coat of arms.
