= Willy Guggenheim =

- Born: Willy Leopold Guggenheim; 16 March 1900; Zurich, Switzerland
- Died: 30 October 1977 (aged 77); Bondo, Switzerland (now Bregaglia, Switzerland)
- Other name: Varlin
- Occupation: Painter
- Spouse: Franca Giovanoli (m. 1963)
- Children: 1

Willy Leopold Guggenheim colloquially Varlin (16 March 1900 – 30 October 1977) was a Swiss painter who was primarily known for his figurative work that emphasized the fragility of everyday life. He was a regular at Kronenhalle and was acquainted with Hugo Loetscher, Friedrich Dürrenmatt, Alberto Giacometti and several others.

== Early life ==
Guggenheim was born 16 March 1900 in Zurich, Switzerland, one of three children, to Hermann Guggenheim and Therese Guggenheim (née Wyler; 1873–1952), into an assimilated Swiss Jewish family. His sisters were; Doris Guggenheim (1898–1911) and Erna Guggenheim (1900–1989).

His paternal family originally hailed from Lengnau, Aargau and was distantly related to the Guggenheim family. He became a well known lithograph and photographer who founded a post card publishing house, which brought the family modest affluence. His mother was from Berne where her father owned a department store.

Guggenheim was raised on the outskirts of Zurich. When he was aged twelve he lost both his father and sister within two months. He ultimately relocated with his mother and sister to St. Gallen. After attending high school he started a year-and-a-half apprenticeship as a lithographer. In 1921, at the age of twenty-one, he went to Berlin to study at the Berlin State School of Fine Arts where he was taught by Emil Orlík. Two years later he moved to Paris where he studied at The Académie Julian Art School. In 1926, his mother retired and he finished his studies.

== Career ==
Aware that he needed to earn a living, he got a job as a clerk with Company Risacher in Faubourg Montmartre. He did not last very long; they reportedly said of him "he can’t even sharpen a pencil!" After this he began drawing cartoons for humour magazines like Froufrou and Ric-rac. He also exhibited some of his work at the Salon des Humoristes.

In 1930 he was discovered by Polish poet and art dealer Leopold Zborovski, who also discovered Chaïm Soutine and Amedeo Modigliani. Zborovski decided Varlin needed to change his name because Guggenheim had bourgeois connotations (especially due to being distantly related to the Guggenheim family) and he thought it would put off the more Bohemian parts of Parisian society. The name Varlin was found after the street named Rue Eugène Varlin.

Zborovski rented a studio in la Ruche for Varlin, where he socialised with Archipenko, Soutine, Chagall and Léger, who also had studios there. In 1931 he exhibited at the Galerie Sloden in Faubourg St-Honoré after living briefly in the south of France. The exhibition was a great success and was extended beyond its original run.

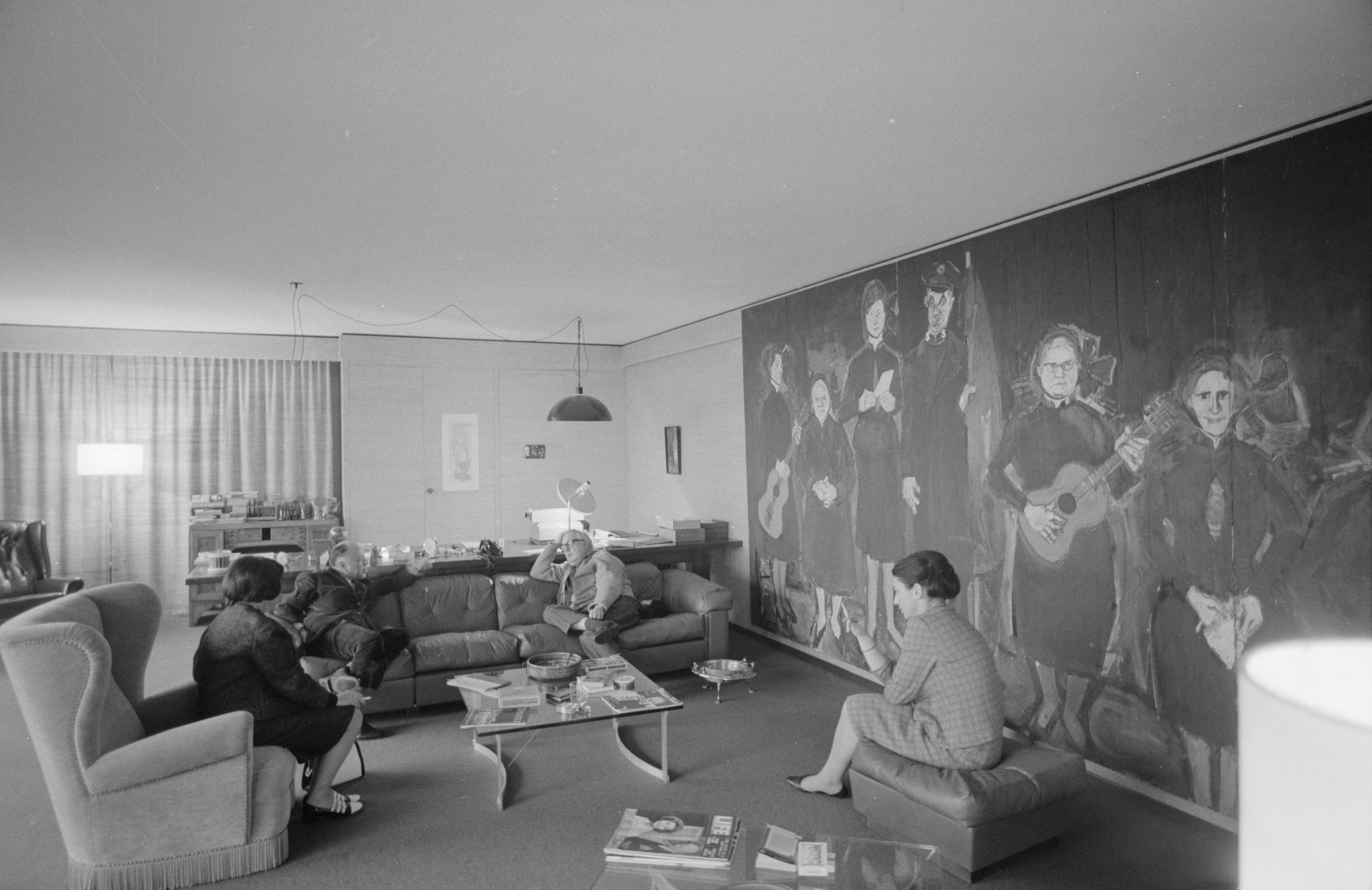
The picture "Die Heilsarmee" (the salvation army) in the house of Friedrich Dürrenmatt; Dürrenmatt and Eugène Ionesco sitting on the sofa.

His friend and mentor Zborovskis died in 1932 and two years later, Varlin returned to Switzerland to be with his mother and sister. He rented a house in Venedigli that was due for demolition and had no banisters and little furniture. Here he lived with the painter Leo Leuppi and some sculptors. They lived in relative poverty but held huge parties that were famous throughout the city.

Over the next three decades Varlin exhibited across Europe in galleries including the Municipal Gallery of Bienne, the Kunstmuseum in St. Gallen and the Venice Biennale. He received a number of Swiss awards and his exhibitions were met with high praise although often controversial. He also served in the second world war but hated military life.

In 1961, Varlin was invited to exhibit at Kunsthaus Zürich, his hometown's museum. The artists and *The Journal DU* dedicated an entire issue to his life and work. Two years later, at the age of 63, he married a woman named Franca Giovanoli, and in 1966, their only daughter was born.

In the spring of 1976 a major exhibition of 59 paintings opened at the Municipal Modern Art Gallery in Milan. On 30 October 1977, Varlin died at his home in Bondo, Switzerland. The same day came the news that the city of Florence had given him The Fiorino D'oro award for his lifework in the arts.

== Personal life ==
In 1963, Guggenheim married Franca Giovanoli (1928–1998), who was originally from Bondo. Upon the marriage he found himself living between Zurich and Bondo. They had one daughter;

- Patrizia Thekla Guggenheim (born 1966), married to Tobias Eichelberg, a German-born art curator, three daughters.

Guggenheim died 30 October 1977 in Bondo, Switzerland aged 77.

== Works ==
- Die "Porte Guillaume" in Chartres 1931
- Restaurant am Genfersee 1936–1945
- Augenklinik in Zürich um 1940
- Ma mère 1943
- Clochard de Paris um 1944
- Bildnis von Rüedi Gasser, 1951, 107 x 80 cm, Museo Cantonale d’Arte, Lugano
- Albertbrücke mit Themse 1955
- Banco di Roma 1960
- Antonia mit Patrizia, 1967, 157.2 x 120.5 cm, Museo Cantonale d’Arte, Lugano
- Zita um 1970
- Das Bett 1970–1975
- Der Schauspieler Ernst Schröder auf dem Bett um 1972
- Erna, 1973, 215.5 x 170 cm, Museo Cantonale d’Arte, Lugano
- Winter in Bondo um 1974
- Erna 1974
- Selbstbildnis 1975
- Die Leute meines Dorfes 1975–1976

== Media ==
- Varlin-Dürrenmatt Horizontal Hrsg.: Centre Dürrenmatt Neuchâtel, Verlag Scheidegger und Spiess, Zürich, 2005; im Buchhandel erhältlich
- Varlin, Prod.: Alfi Sinniger, Catpics AG; Kamera: Pio Corradi; Schweiz 2000; 80 Min. DVD beim Varlin-Archiv erhältlich
- Varlin a Bondo; a cura di Mathias Picenoni, Patrizia Guggenheim e Vincenzo Todisco,

Quaderni grigionitaliani, Fasciolo speciale Edizione della Pro Grigioni Italiano, Coira, dicembre 2000

- Varlin, Leben und Werk entspricht Band 1 des Werkverzeichnisses; Verlag Scheidegger und Spiess, Zürich, 2000; vergriffen
- Varlin, Werkverzeichnis der Bilder Hrsg.: Schweizerischer Institut für Kunstwissenschaft;

2 Bände mit CD-Rom; Verlag Scheidegger und Spiess, Zürich, 2000; beim Verlag erhältlich

- Wenn ich dichten könnte Hrsg.: Patrizia Guggenheim und Tobias Eichelberg; Verlag Scheidegger und Spiess, Zürich, 1998; beim Verlag erhältlich
- Briefe und Schriften Hrsg.: Franca Guggenheim und Peter Keckeis; Verlag NZZ, Zürich, 1989;

vergriffen

- wie er schrieb und zeichnete Hrsg.: Hugo Loetscher; GS-Verlag, Zürich 1983; vergriffen
- Varlin Texte: Friedrich Dürrenmatt, Max Frisch, Jürg Fedespiel, Manuel Gasser, Hugo Loetscher, Paul Nizon, Giovanni Testori, Varlin; Varlag Scheidegger, Zürich 1978; vergriffen
- Varlin. Der Maler und sein Werk Hrsg.: Hugo Loetscher Texte: Manuel Gasser, Varlin, Friedrich Dürrenmatt, Max Frisch, Hugo Loetscher, Paul Nizon; Verlag Arche, Zürich 1969; vergriffen
