= Val Bregaglia =

Alpine valley in Switzerland and Italy

Coordinates: 46.3324°N 9.514°E

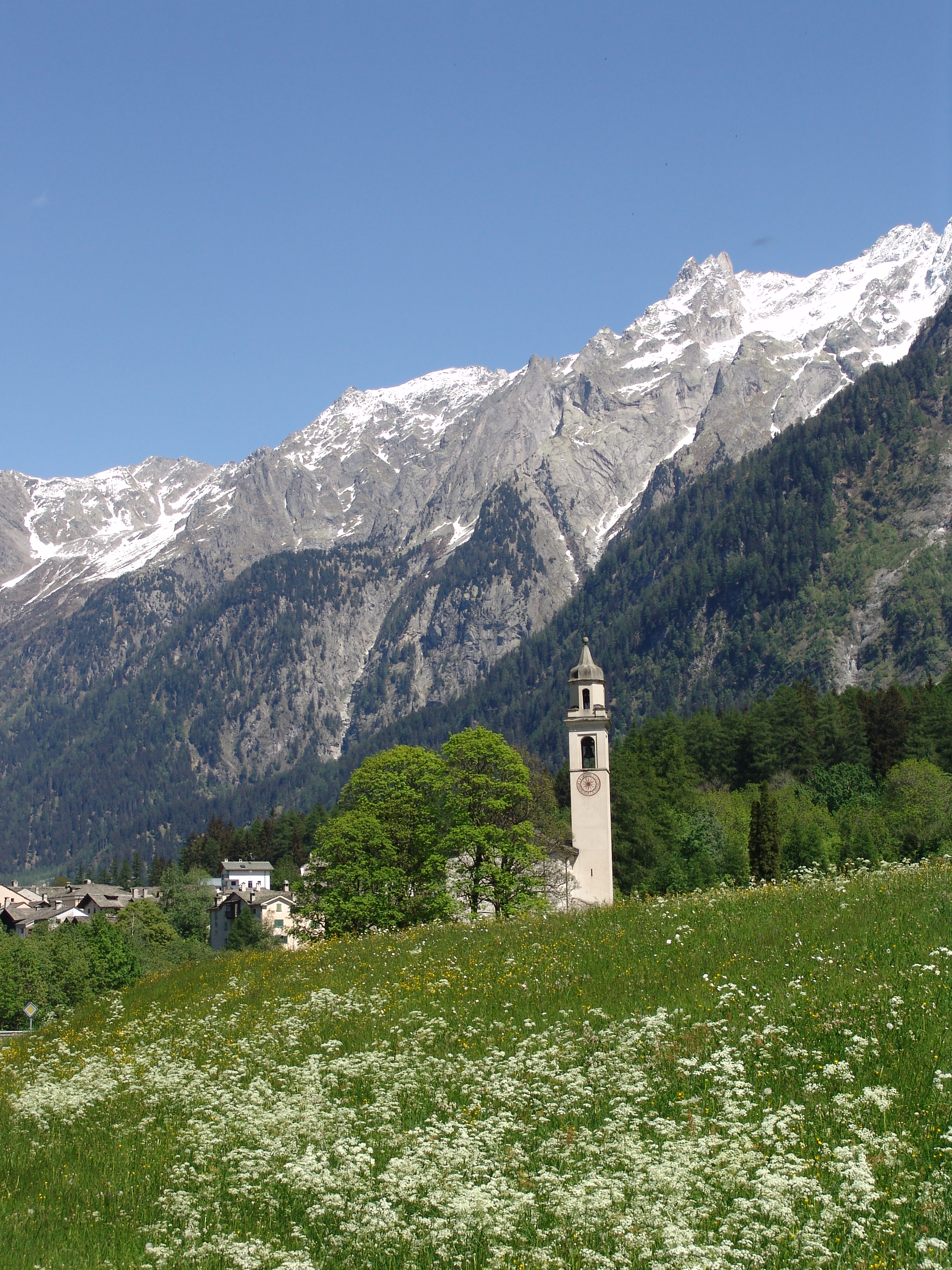
The Maloja Pass in the Bregaglia Valley

The Val Bregaglia (Lombard: Val Bregaja; German: Bergell, pronounced [bɛʁˈɡɛl]; Romansh: Val Bregaglia) is an alpine valley of Switzerland and Italy at the base of which runs the river Mera (Romansh and Lombard: Maira).

Most of the valley falls within the Swiss district of Maloja in the canton of the Grisons, the lower part within the Italian province of Sondrio. The valley includes the Swiss former municipalities of Vicosoprano, Stampa, Bondo, Soglio and Castasegna (now consolidated into the municipality of Bregaglia); and the Italian municipalities of Villa di Chiavenna, Piuro, and Chiavenna.

The Swiss part of the valley is inhabited by the descendants of Italian Protestants, some descending from those who settled here in the mid-16th century to avoid persecution by the Inquisition, and today about 75% of the population is Protestant. The local dialect is a variety of Lombard with similarities to neighboring dialects of Romansh.

Elektrizitätswerk der Stadt Zürich (EWZ) operates three hydroelectric power plants in the valley at Vicosoprano, Bondo and Castasegna. The hydroelectric project at Vicosoprano was formed by damming the river Albigna, forming Lake Albigna. Located approximately 1000 m above the town and set back, the site is reachable by Albigna Bahn, an aerial tramway operated by EWZ. A 108 km^{2} tract of the valley has been identified as an Important Bird Area by BirdLife International.

== Geography ==
The valley begins at the Maloja Pass (1815 m) which connects it to the Engadin (the valley of the Inn, which is part of the Danube basin). There the river Orlegna extends westwards and joins the river Mera to Chiavenna shortly after which the Mera joins with the Liro and turns south towards Lake Como. From Chiavenna to Maloja, a distance of 32 km, the valley rises 1482 m.

In this valley sources of three important basins have their origin: the Rhine (through the Avers Rhine), which runs to the North Sea, the Inn, which runs to the Danube (near Passau), and the rivers Mera and Adda, which run to the Po.

The Bregaglia Range is the group of mountains to the south of the valley.

== Name ==
Some scholars, including E. Dubois and James S. Reid, asserts the valley takes its name from the Celtic Bergalei tribe that inhabited it, a name otherwise lost except for a mention on Tabula clesiana, a Roman plate.

18th-century documents derived modern Lombard Bregaglia from Middle Latin Pregallia ("pre-Gaul, anterior Gaul"). The Latin name Pregallia was used for the valley from at least the 13th century.
