= Caccior =

Hamlet in Graubünden, Switzerland

Coordinates: 46.344472°N 9.564661°E

Caccior is a hamlet in Graubünden, Switzerland.
