= Villa di Chiavenna =

- Comune
- Comune di Villa di Chiavenna
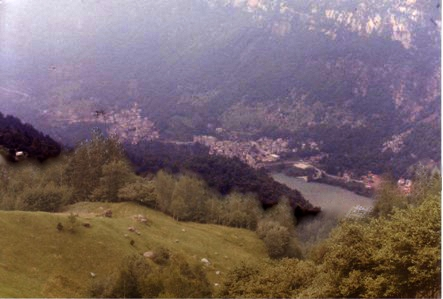

- Coat of arms

- Location within Italy Location within Lombardy
- Coordinates: 46°20′N 9°29′E
- Country: Italy
- Region: Lombardy
- Province: Sondrio (SO)
- Frazioni: Canete, Case Foratti, Case Scattoni, Chete, Dogana, Giavera, Ponteggia, San Barnaba, San Sebastiano

Government
  - Mayor: Massimiliano Tam

Area
  - Total: 32.7 km^{2} (12.6 sq mi)
- Elevation: 633 m (2,077 ft)

Population (Dec. 2004)
  - Total: 1,109
  - Density: 33.9/km^{2} (87.8/sq mi)
- Demonym: Villesi
- Time zone: UTC+1 (CET)
  - Summer (DST): UTC+2 (CEST)
- Postal code: 23029
- Dialing code: 0343
- Website: Official website

Villa di Chiavenna is a comune (municipality) in the province of Sondrio, in the Italian region of Lombardy, located about 100 kilometres (62 mi) north of Milan and about 35 kilometres (22 mi) northwest of Sondrio, on the border with Switzerland.

Villa di Chiavenna borders the following municipalities: Bondo (Switzerland), Castasegna (Switzerland), Novate Mezzola, Piuro, Soglio (Switzerland).

The actress and film director Stefania Casini was born in Villa di Chiavenna.
