= Soglio, Switzerland =

Soglio
- Former municipality
- Coat of arms
- Location of Soglio
- Location within Switzerland Location within Canton of Grisons
- Coordinates: 46°20′N 9°32′E
- Country: Switzerland
- Canton: Grisons
- District: Maloja

Area
  - Total: 67.64 km^{2} (26.12 sq mi)
- Elevation: 1,090 m (3,580 ft)

Population (December 2008)
  - Total: 167
  - Density: 2.47/km^{2} (6.39/sq mi)
- Time zone: UTC+01:00 (CET)
  - Summer (DST): UTC+02:00 (CEST)
- Postal code: 7610
- SFOS number: 3774
- ISO 3166 code: CH-GR
- Surrounded by: Avers, Bivio, Bondo, Castasegna, Piuro (Italy-SO), Stampa, Vicosoprano, Villa di Chiavenna (Italy-SO)
- Website: SFSO statistics

Soglio is a village and a former municipality in the district of Maloja in the Swiss canton of the Grisons close to the border with Italy. It is now part of the municipality of Bregaglia.

== History ==
Soglio is first mentioned in 1186 as de Solio.

== Geography ==
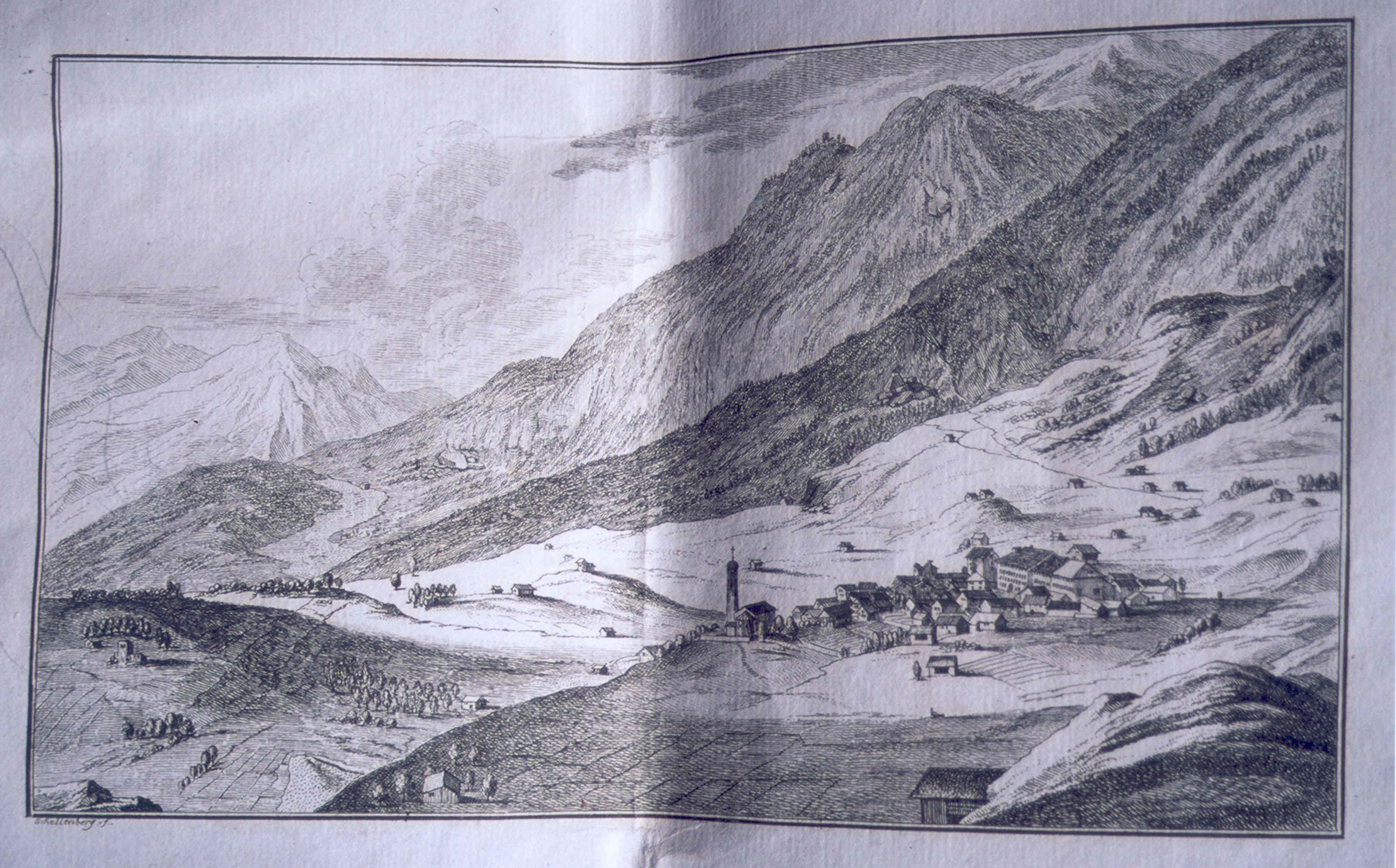
Soglio from the Stemmatographia Saliceorum

Soglio has an area, as of 2006, of 67.6 km^{2} (26.1 sq mi). Of this area, 25.3% is used for agricultural purposes, while 8.6% is forested. Of the rest of the land, 0.5% is settled (buildings or roads) and the remainder (65.6%) is non-productive (rivers, glaciers or mountains).

The municipality is located in the Bergell sub-district of the Maloja district. It is located on a terrace at the entrance to the Passo della Duana which leads into the valley of Avers and the Passo da la Prasignola into the Val Madris. It consists of the village of Soglio (at 1,095 m (3,593 ft)) and the section of Spino.

Soglio lies on a ledge on the mountainside on the northern side of the Val Bregaglia (Bergell in German) above the river Maira (Mera in Italian), with views across the valley to the Bondasca glacier and the peaks of the Sciora group, Piz Cengalo and Piz Badile in the Bregaglia Range.

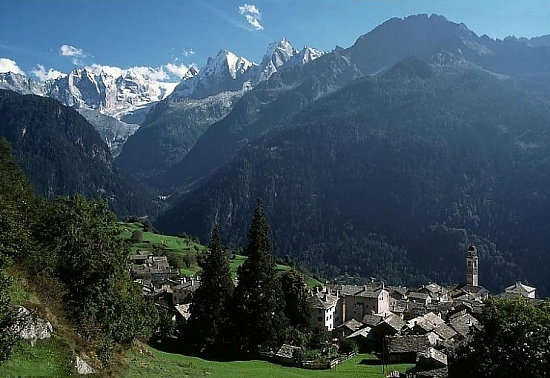
View of Soglio (foreground) with the Sciora peaks (left), Piz Cengalo (left centre) and Piz Badile (centre)

The town is 17 kilometers (11 mi) from the Italian town of Chiavenna at the foot of the Val Bregaglia, and 39 km (24 mi) from Sankt Moritz in the Engadine valley which is reached via the Maloja Pass. These two towns provide the nearest railway stations. The highest point of the territory of the municipality is the summit of Piz Duan (3,131 m (10,272 ft)).

On 1 January 2010 the municipalities of Bondo, Castasegna, Soglio, Stampa, and Vicosoprano were merged into a new municipality of Bregaglia.

== Demographics ==
Soglio has a population (as of 2008) of 167, of which 7.8% are foreign nationals. Over the last 10 years the population has decreased by 13.5%.

As of 2000, the gender distribution of the population was 43.9% male and 56.1% female. The age distribution, as of 2000, in Soglio is; 8 children or 4.7% of the population are between 0 and 9 years old. 11 teenagers or 6.4% are 10 to 14, and 6 teenagers or 3.5% are 15 to 19. Of the adult population, 11 people or 6.4% of the population are between 20 and 29 years old. 14 people or 8.1% are 30 to 39, 32 people or 18.6% are 40 to 49, and 28 people or 16.3% are 50 to 59. The senior population distribution is 17 people or 9.9% of the population are between 60 and 69 years old, 27 people or 15.7% are 70 to 79, there are 15 people or 8.7% who are 80 to 89, and there are 3 people or 1.7% who are 90 to 99.

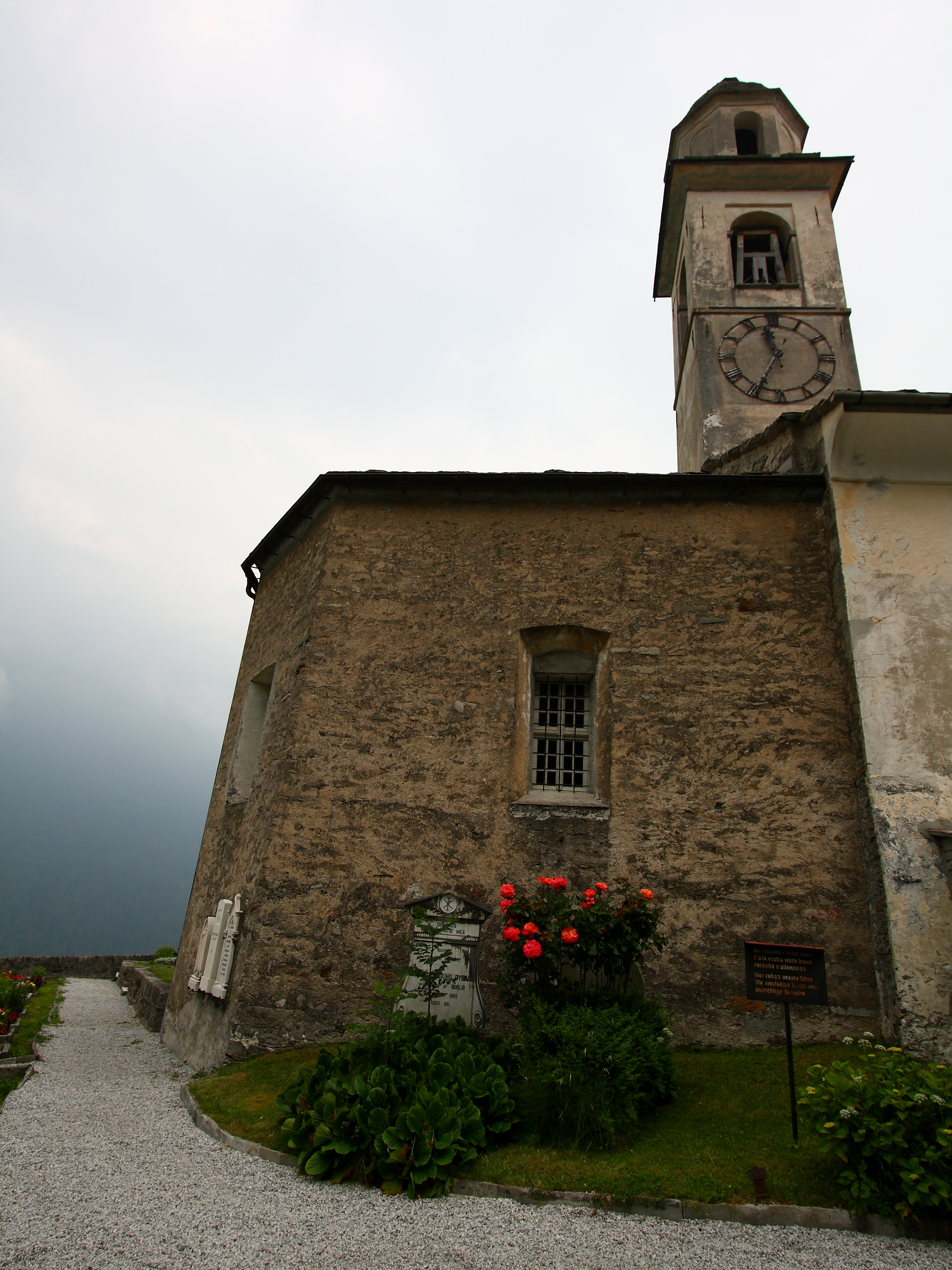
Village church of Soglio

In 1552 the village converted during the Protestant Reformation. Most of the population of the village are still members of the Swiss Reformed Church.

In the 2007 federal election the most popular party was the SVP which received 53.1% of the vote. The next three most popular parties were the SP (24.5%), the FDP (15.2%) and the CVP (7.2%).

In Soglio about 73.6% of the population (between age 25-64) have completed either non-mandatory upper secondary education or additional higher education (either University or a Fachhochschule).

Soglio has an unemployment rate of 0.2%. As of 2005, there were 18 people employed in the primary economic sector and about 9 businesses involved in this sector. 34 people are employed in the secondary sector and there are 8 businesses in this sector. 140 people are employed in the tertiary sector, with 15 businesses in this sector.

The historical population is given in the following table:

| year | population |
|---|---|
| 1850 | 388 |
| 1900 | 349 |
| 1950 | 287 |
| 1960 | 326 |
| 1970 | 219 |
| 1980 | 220 |
| 1990 | 216 |
| 2000 | 172 |

== Languages ==
Most of the population (as of 2000) speaks Italian (80.2%), with German being second most common (17.4%) and English being third ( 1.7%). The majority of the population speaks the local dialect of Lombard .

Languages in Soglio GR
| Languages | Census 1980 | | Census 1990 | | Census 2000 | |
| Languages | Number | Percent | Number | Percent | Number | Percent |
|---|---|---|---|---|---|---|
| German | 19 | 8.64% | 33 | 15.28% | 30 | 17.44% |
| Italian | 188 | 85.45% | 177 | 81.94% | 138 | 80.23% |
| Population | 220 | 100% | 216 | 100% | 172 | 100% |

== Notable residents ==
Soglio is the commune of origin for the De Salis family, one of the oligarch families of the Grisons, later to become Count de Salis-Soglio. There are several Salis houses in the village: Casa Alta; Casa Battista; Casa di Mezzo; and Casa Antonio. The Casa Battista is now a hotel – Hotel Palazzo Salis (formerly Pensione Willy) – while the others are tenements. For centuries the Salis family fortunes influenced the region, and the bars from the family arms are present in the coat of arms of the municipality, below the capricorn, which indicates church membership.

== Heritage sites ==
- The Soglio Reformed Church, first mentioned in 1354.
- Cas' Alta, a medieval tower house of the De Salis family, converted into a residential tower in 1524 and expanded in 1680 by governor Anton von Salis.
- Casa Battista, no. 131, also known as the Hotel Palazzo Salis, built onto an older structure in 1630 for Battista von Salis. (Listed as Swiss heritage site of national significance)
- Casa Antonio, no. 139, built 1763–66 for Andreas von Salis. (Listed as heritage site of national significance.)
- Casa di Mezzo, built behind Cas' Alta and Casa Battista for the brothers Rudolf, Friedrich Anton and Andreas von Salis in 1696.
- Casa Gubert, built on the eastern edge of the village in 1554–73 for Captain Dietegen von Salis over an older structure.
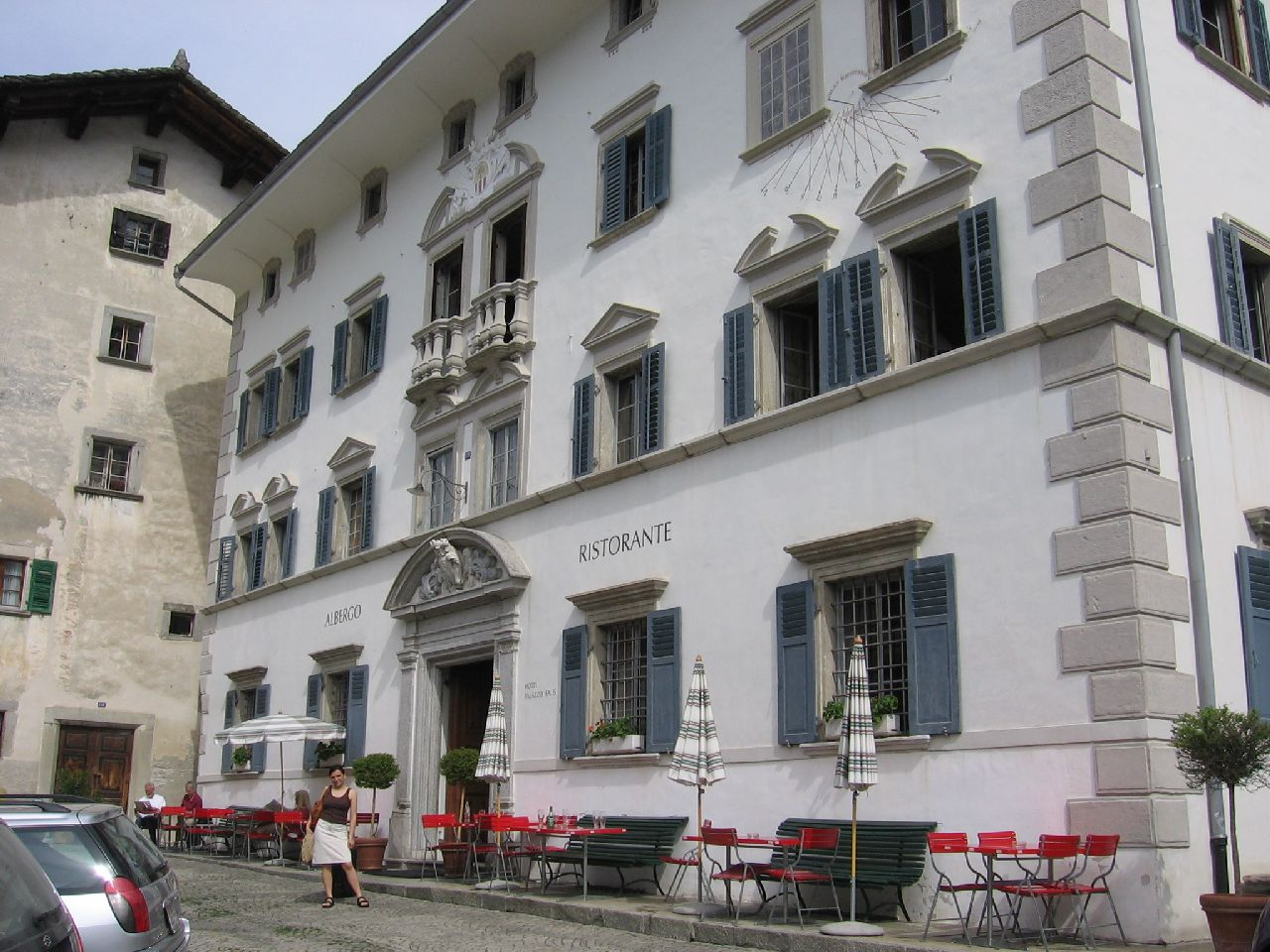
Exterior of the Hotel Palazzo Salis (Casa Battista)

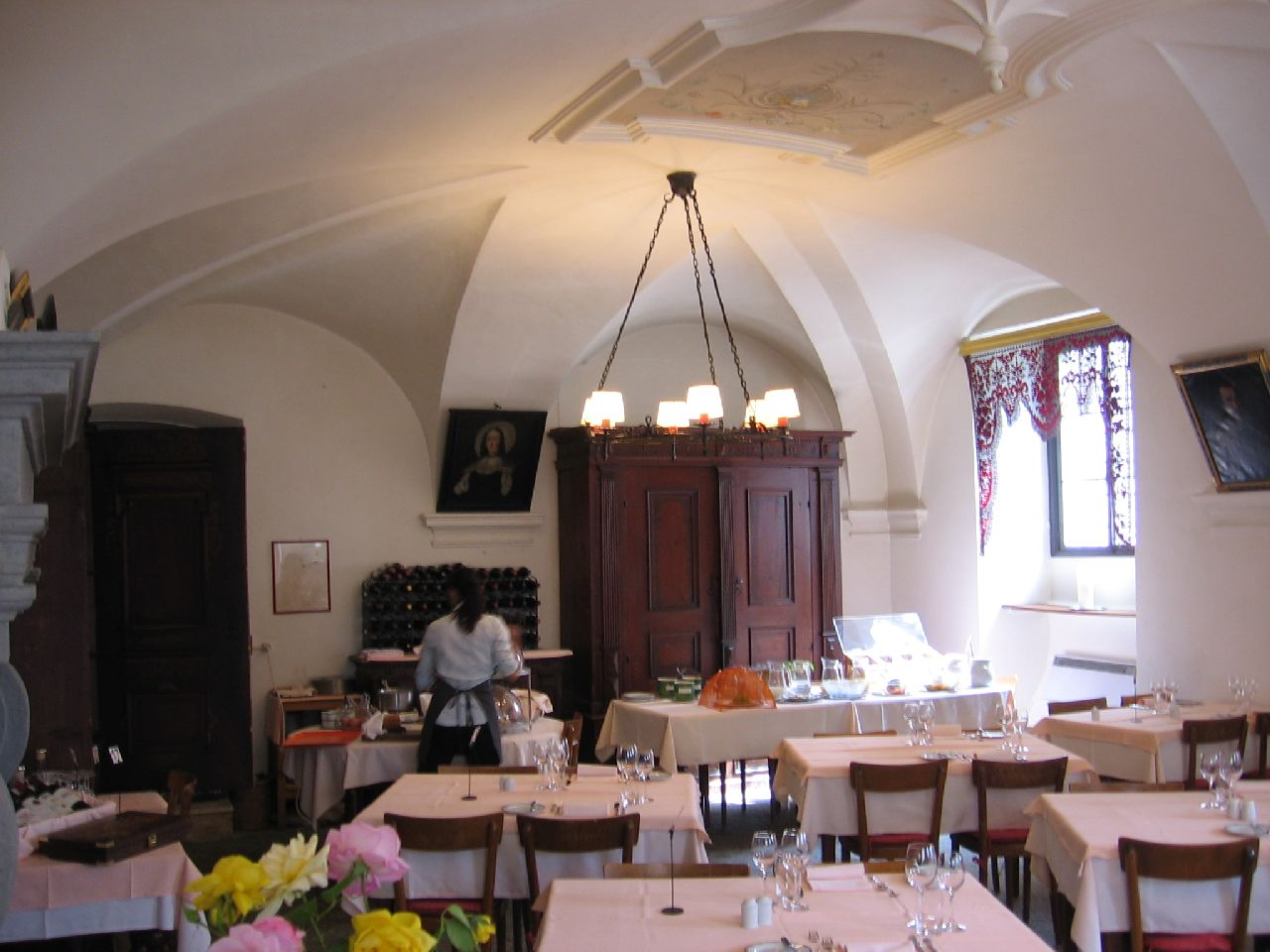
Dining room of Hotel Palazzo Salis

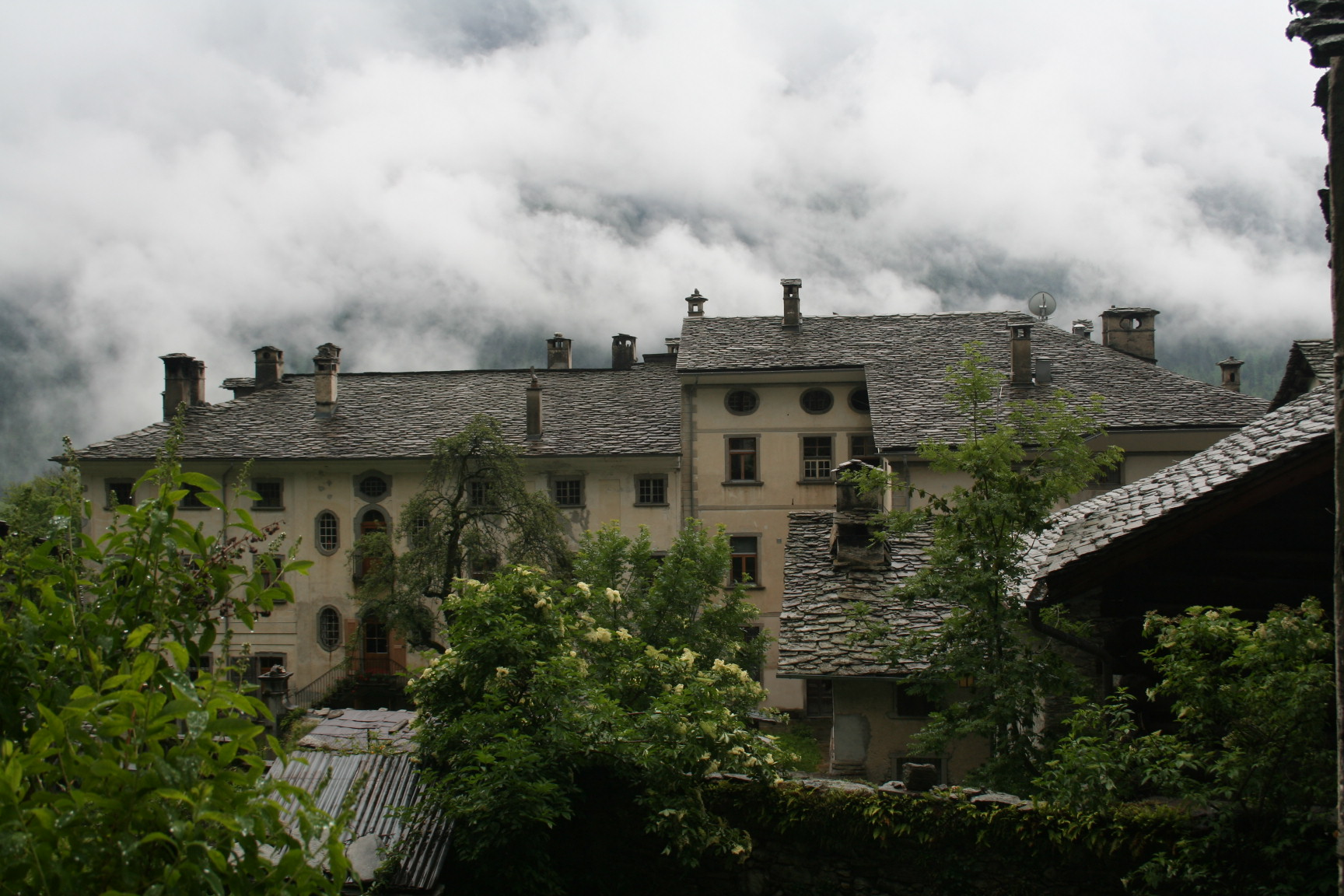
Casa Antonio & Casa di Mezzo, Soglio

== Weather ==
Soglio has an average of 101.8 days of rain per year and on average receives 1,459 mm (57.4 in) of precipitation. The wettest month is May during which time Soglio receives an average of 179 mm (7.0 in) of precipitation. During this month there is precipitation for an average of 12.7 days. The driest month of the year is February with an average of 55 mm (2.2 in) of precipitation over 12.7 days.
