= Bondo, Switzerland =

Bondo
- Former municipality
- Coat of arms
- Location of Bondo
- Location within Switzerland Location within Canton of Graubünden
- Coordinates: 46°20′N 9°33′E
- Country: Switzerland
- Canton: Graubünden
- District: Maloja

Area
  - Total: 26.26 km^{2} (10.14 sq mi)
- Elevation (Church): 823 m (2,700 ft)

Population (December 2008)
  - Total: 204
  - Density: 7.77/km^{2} (20.1/sq mi)
- Time zone: UTC+01:00 (CET)
  - Summer (DST): UTC+02:00 (CEST)
- Postal code: 7606
- SFOS number: 3771
- ISO 3166 code: CH-GR
- Surrounded by: Castasegna, Novate Mezzola (IT-SO), Soglio, Stampa, Val Masino (IT-SO), Vicosoprano, Villa di Chiavenna (IT-SO)
- Website: www.bondo.ch

Bondo (Romansh: Buond) is a village and a former municipality in the district of Maloja in the Swiss canton of Grisons. It is now part of the municipality of Bregaglia.

== Geography ==
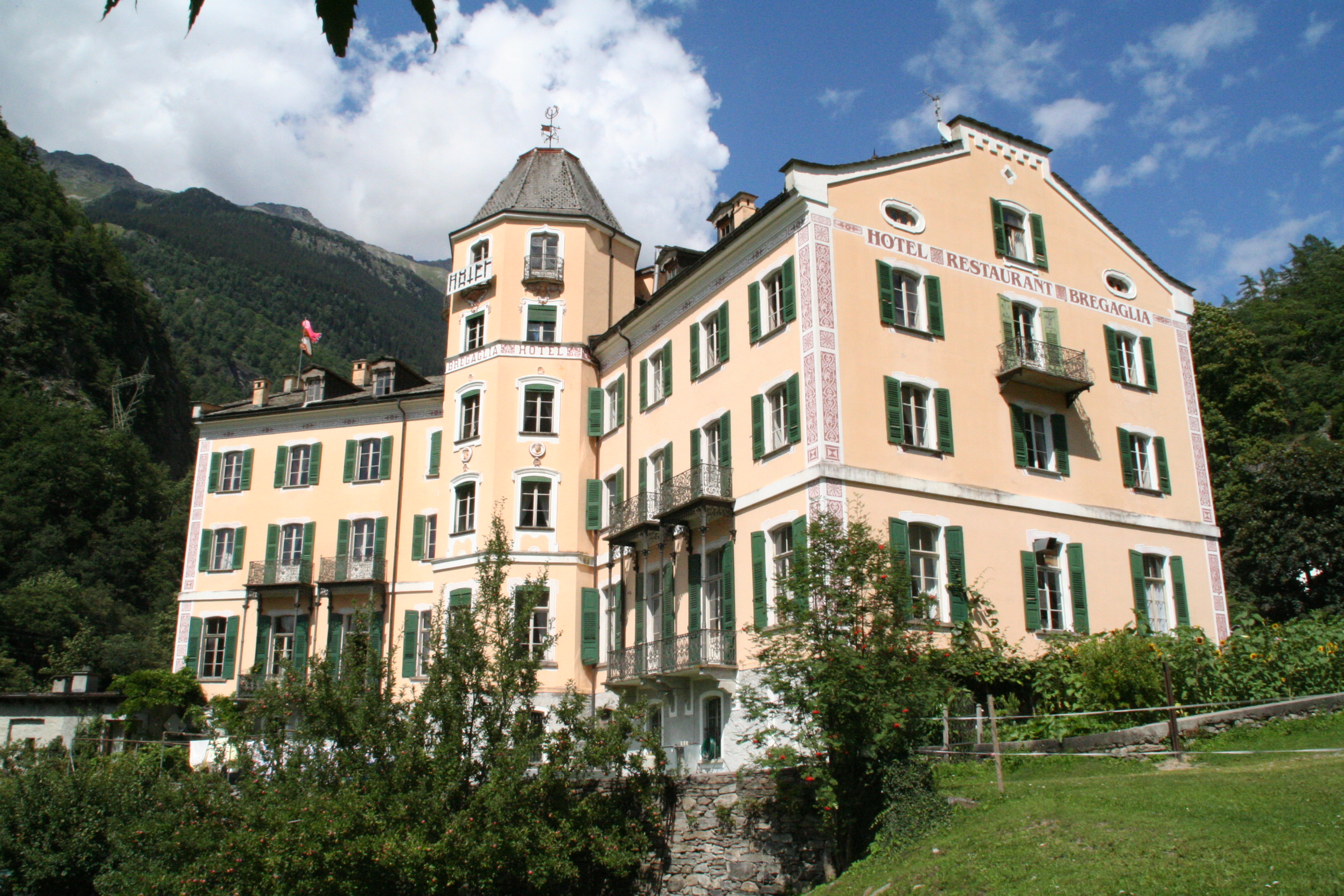
The Hotel Bregaglia on the mountainside

The municipality is located near the Swiss–Italian border south of the river Mera in the Val Bregaglia (known as Bergell in German). It is located in the Bergell sub-district of the Maloja district. The valley floor is so deep that parts of the village do not receive any sunlight in winter. The Val Bondasca leads up from Bondo to Piz Badile and Piz Cengalo, two peaks of the Bregaglia Range.

The municipality of Bondo also includes the smaller village of Promontogno and, above that on a rocky outcrop, the ruins of the fort Castelmur. Additionally there are several abandoned settlements.

Bondo has an area, as of 2006, of 28.2 km^{2} (10.9 sq mi). Of this area, 2.5% is used for agricultural purposes, while 37.6% is forested. Of the rest of the land, 0.6% is settled (buildings or roads) and the remainder (59.3%) is non-productive (rivers, glaciers or mountains).

On 1 January 2010 the municipalities of Bondo, Castasegna, Soglio, Stampa, and Vicosoprano merged into the new municipality of Bregaglia.

== History ==
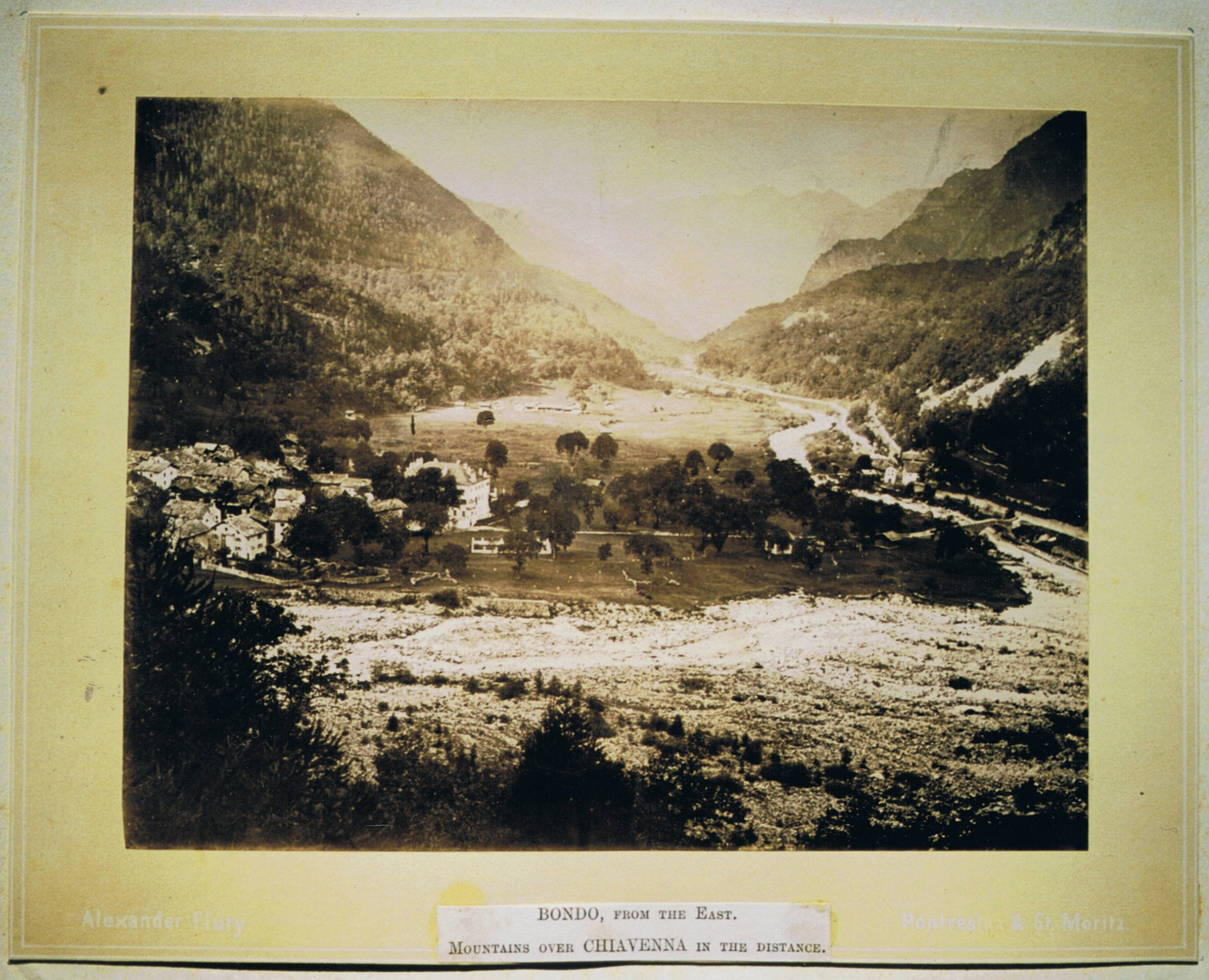
View of Bondo from the north, c. 1870

Under the Carolingian dynasty Bondo belonged to the Ministerium Bergallia, which was a dependant of the early Bishops of Chur, though after 960 it was owned directly by the Bishop. The valley church of S. Maria at Castelmur is first mentioned in 988, while the village church for Bondo, S. Martino, was consecrated in 1250. During the High Middle Ages Bondo was part of several villages that were collectively known as di là dell'acqua ('across the water'), which were part of the district of Unterporta. In 1367 Bondo, together with the rest of Unterporta, joined the League of God's House (German: Gotteshausbund). In 1380 it was first mentioned under the name of Bondo. In German it was also known as Bundth while in Romansh it was known as Buond.

In 1552 the Protestant Reformation reached the village. During the 16th century some of the population left Bondo to Italy, and later to eastern Europe (either as bakers or soldiers). This trend has continued into the 20th century, except many now leave for northern Graubünden or the rest of Switzerland.

During the Thirty Years' War the Three Leagues were rocked by the Bündner Wirren or Confusion of the Leagues, as the decentralized leagues fought each other over religion and politics. In 1621, during the Confusion, Spanish troops burned the entire town to the ground, destroying about 248 structures. The town was rebuilt along new central streets.

Video of the debris flow on the 23 of August 2017

=== 2017 debris flows ===
In August 2017 a series of debris flows from the adjacent mountain Piz Cengalo destroyed dozens of buildings and a bridge in Bondo, and resulted in the disappearance of eight hikers in Val Bondesca, up the valley from Bondo. The missing people were Swiss, Austrian and German.

== Demographics ==
Bondo has a population (as of 2008) of 204, of which 10.3% are foreign nationals. Over the last 10 years the population has decreased at a rate of −0.5%.

19th-century photograph of a drawing of the Hotel Bregaglia, Promontogno, taken from Bondo.

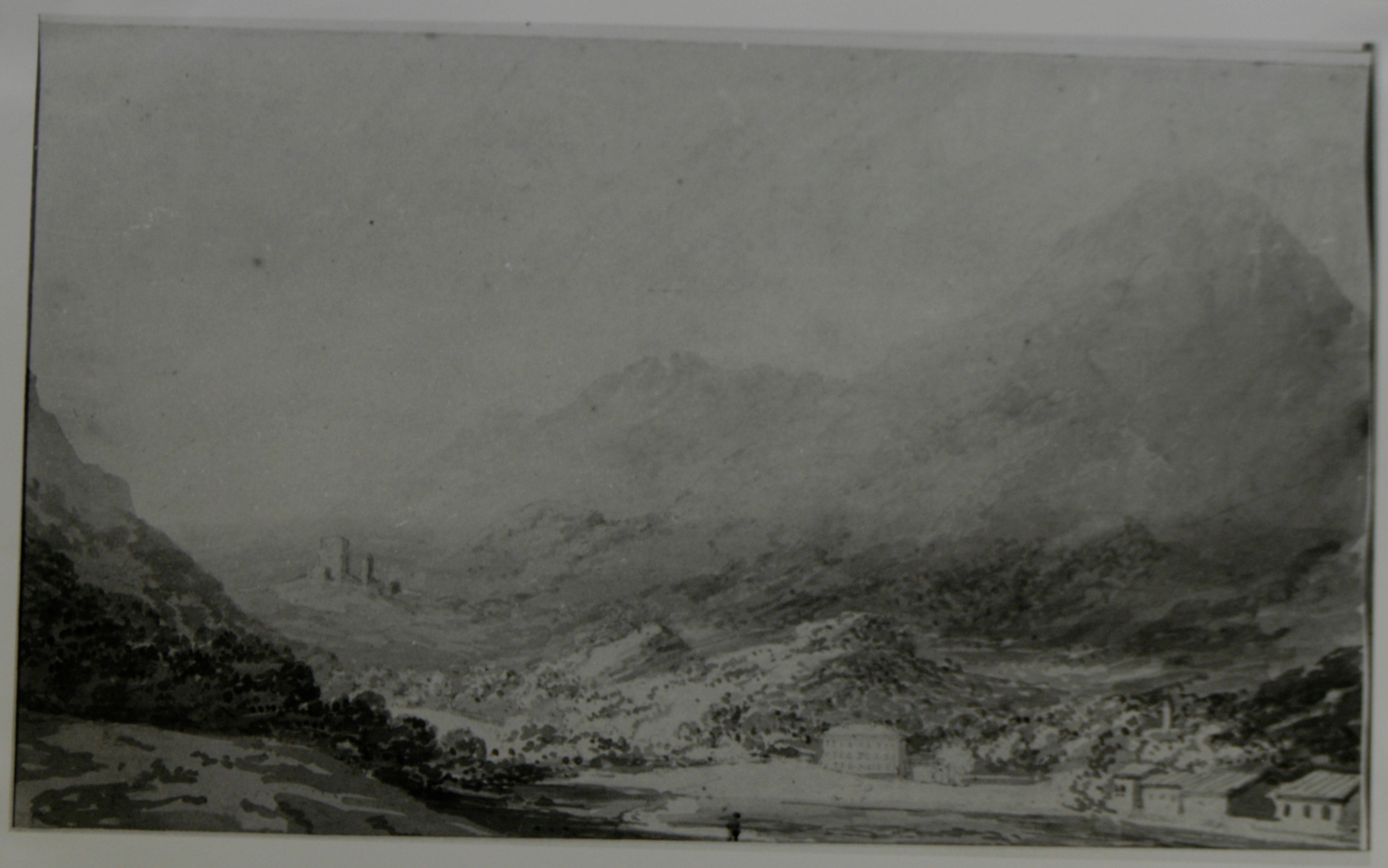
Bondo, and Castlemur, Promontogno, from the south by John Robert Cozens, (or a copy of the Cozens by J. M. W. Turner).

As of 2000, the gender distribution of the population was 48.7% male and 51.3% female. The age distribution, as of 2000, in Bondo is: 17 children or 9.4% of the population are between 0 and 9 years old. 8 teenagers or 4.4% are 10 to 14, and 4 teenagers or 2.2% are 15 to 19. Of the adult population, 16 people or 8.8% of the population are between 20 and 29 years old. 24 people or 13.3% are 30 to 39, 18 people or 9.9% are 40 to 49, and 29 people or 16.0% are 50 to 59. The senior population distribution is 19 people or 10.5% of the population are between 60 and 69 years old, 30 people or 16.6% are 70 to 79, there are 13 people or 7.2% who are 80 to 89, and there are 3 people or 1.7% who are 90 to 99.

In the 2007 federal election the most popular party was the SP which received 37% of the vote. The next three most popular parties were the SVP (32.4%), the FDP (20.2%) and the CVP (10.5%).

In Bondo about 63.8% of the population (between age 25–64) have completed either non-mandatory upper secondary education or additional higher education (either University or a Fachhochschule).

Bondo has an unemployment rate of 0.61%. As of 2005, there were 16 people employed in the primary economic sector and about 5 businesses involved in this sector. 22 people are employed in the secondary sector and there are 3 businesses in this sector. 36 people are employed in the tertiary sector, with 8 businesses in this sector.

The historical population is given in the following table:

year	population
1803	235
1850	230
1900	304
1950	239
1960	254
2000	181

== Languages ==
Most of the population (as of 2000) speaks Italian (77.3%), with German being second most common (19.3%) and Romansh being third ( 1.7%). In 1900, 92.76% of the population spoke Italian and in 1970 it was 95.65%. It wasn't until 1980 that there was a significant German-speaking minority.

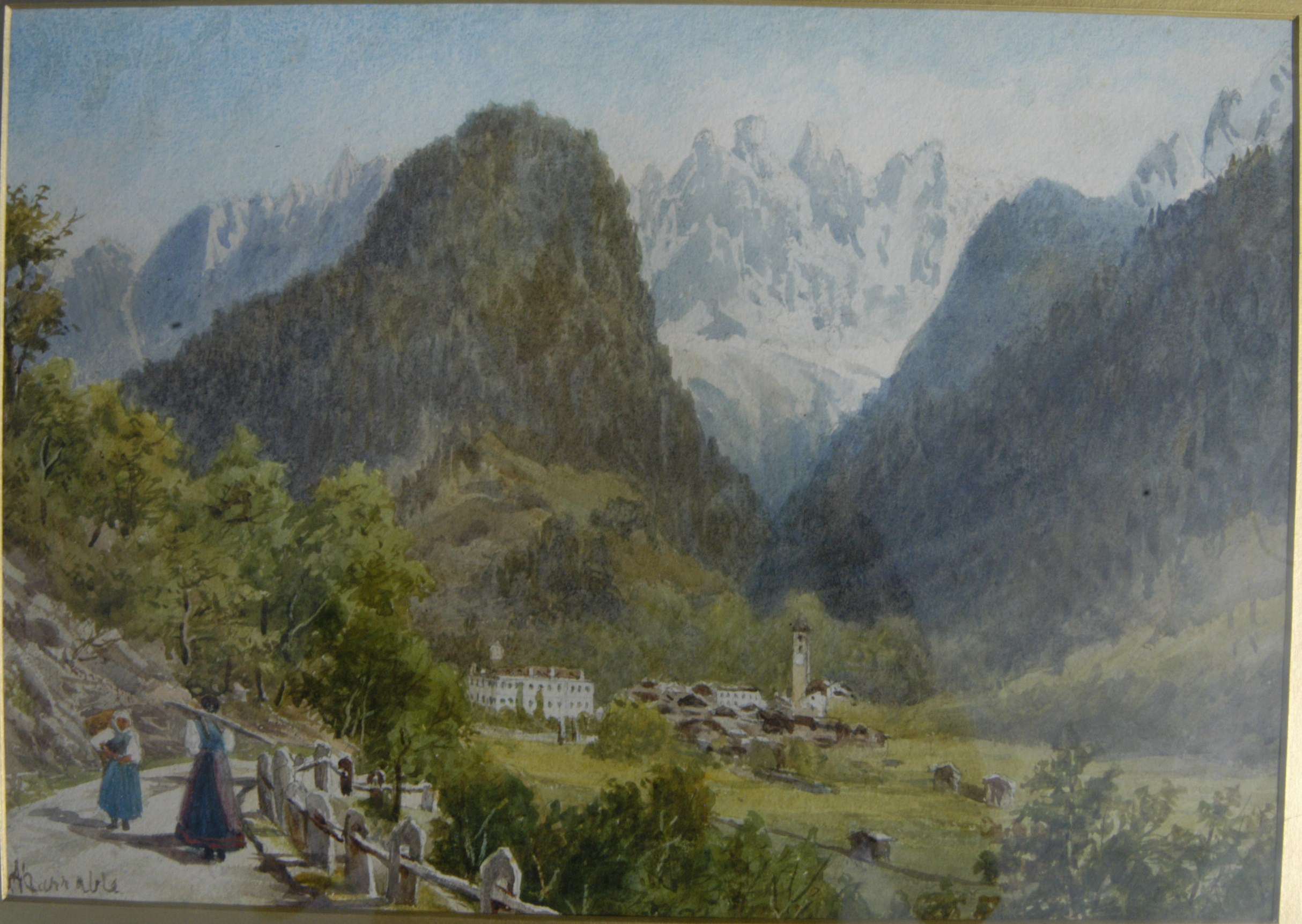
Watercolour, c. 1880, of Bondo from the south-west, the road from Soglio, by Madeline Marrable.

Languages in Bondo GR
Languages	Census 1980		Census 1990		Census 2000	
Languages	Number	Percent	Number	Percent	Number	Percent
German	25	13.59%	26	16.15%	35	19.34%
Romansh	1	0.54%	0	0.00%	3	1.66%
Italian	155	84.24%	133	82.61%	140	77.35%
Population	184	100%	161	100%	181	100%

== Architecture ==
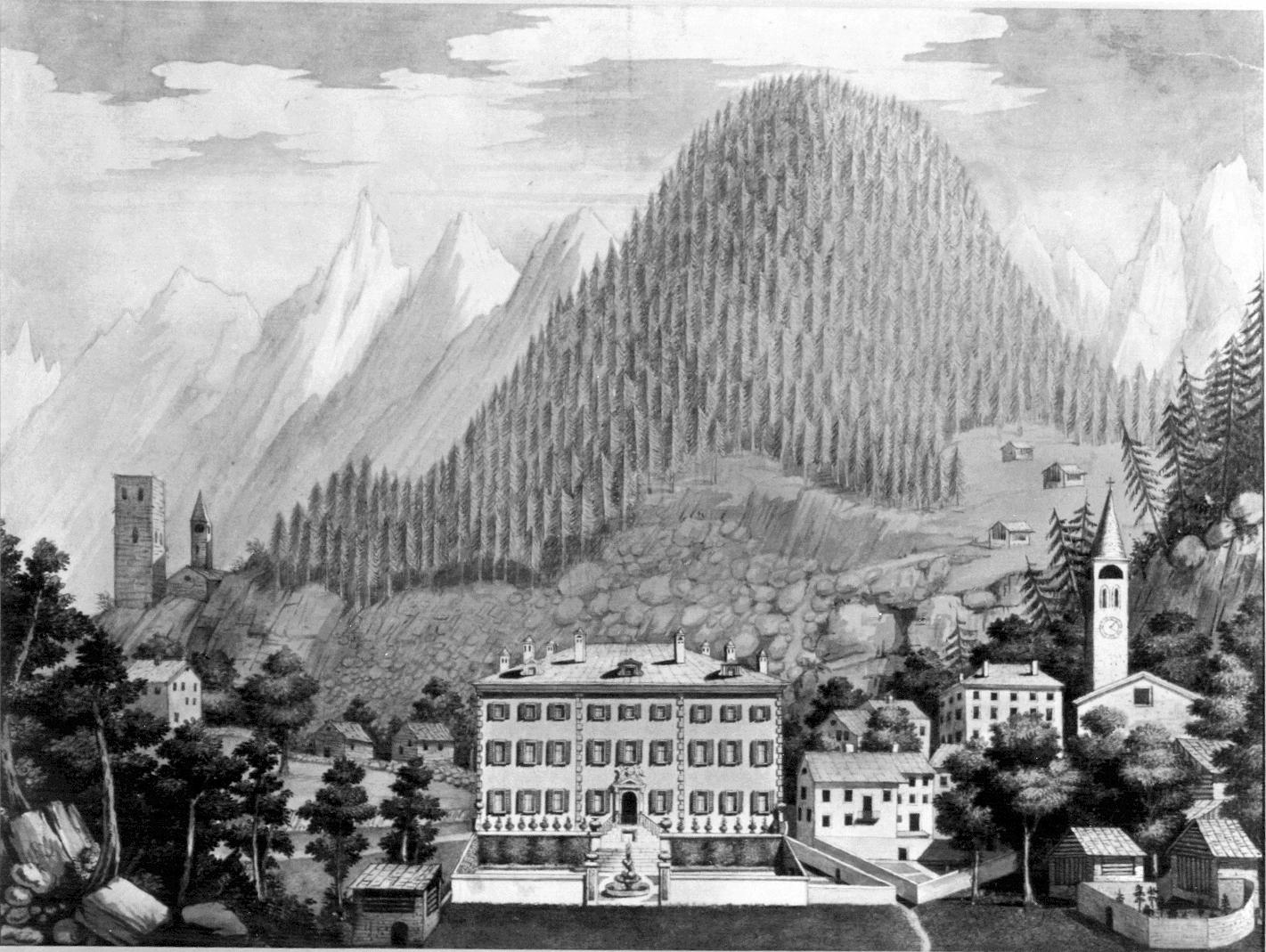
Topographical drawing of Bondo, c. 1770

The church of S. Maria in Castelmur was largely rebuilt in the 19th century, but still has its Romanesque campanile. S. Maria in Bondo also has a Romanesque bell tower. This church was restored in the 17th century but retains an important late 15th-century fresco cycle. The remains of the painter Varlin are interred in the nearby cemetery. Further notable buildings include the Casa Molinari, the Palazzo Scartazzini of 1690, the Palazzo Scartazzini am Platz (formerly Cortini) of 1763 and the Palazzo Salis; this last was begun by Jerome de Salis-Soglio in 1765 for his wife Mary and completed by their son in 1774. It is still today owned by the Count de Salis-Soglio. There is also a group of crotti towards Promontagno. In the twentieth century the painter Varlin captured much of the spirit of the village.

== Heritage sites of national significance ==
The Castelmur medieval fortifications, the church of S. Maria and the Palazzo Salis are listed as Swiss heritage sites of national significance.
