= Bregaglia =

- Municipality
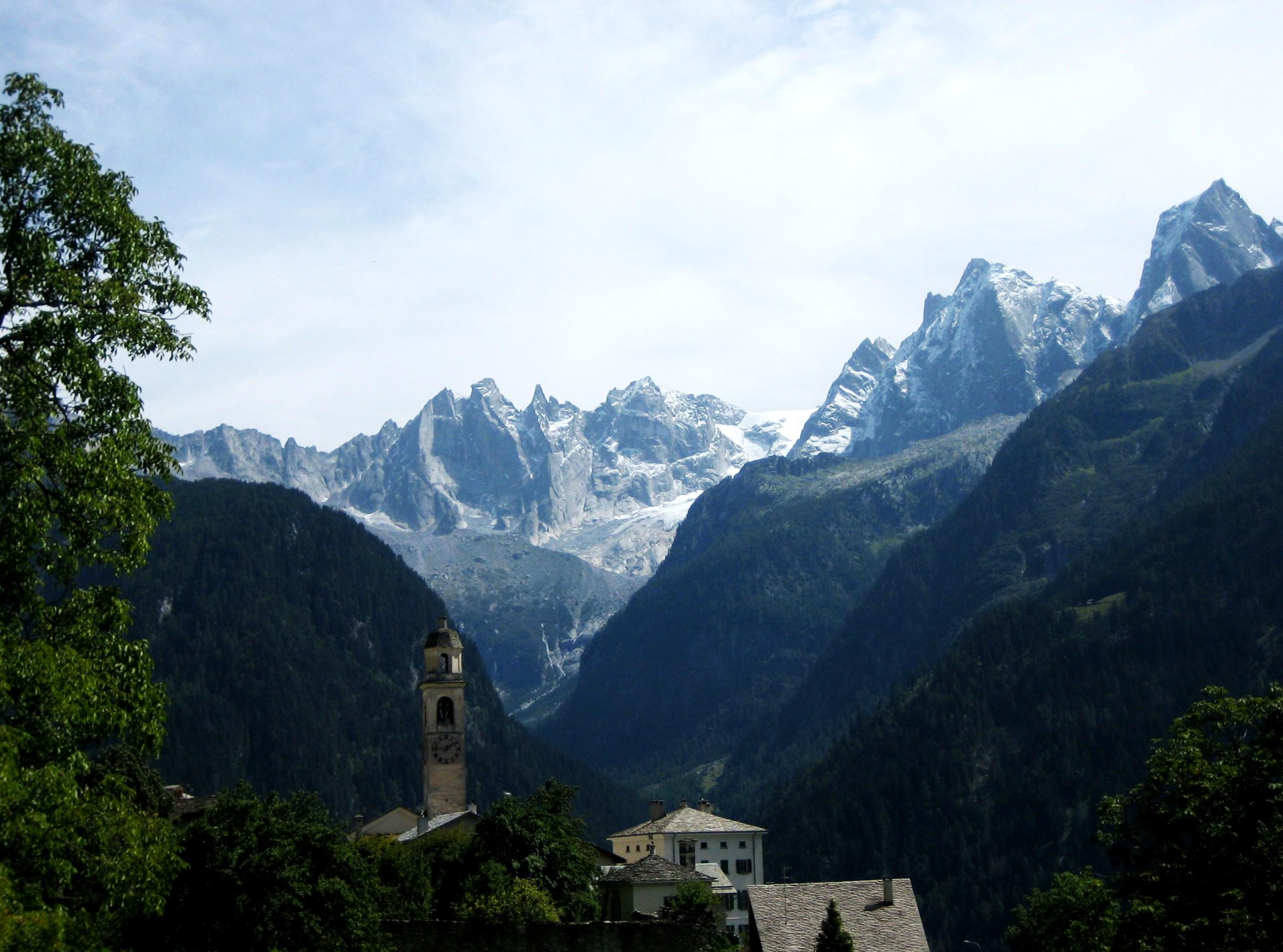

- Flag Coat of arms
- Location of Bregaglia
- Location within Switzerland Location within Canton of Grisons
- Coordinates: 46°20′N 09°35′E
- Country: Switzerland
- Canton: Grisons
- District: Maloja

Government
  - Mayor: Anna Giacometti

Area
  - Total: 251.45 km^{2} (97.09 sq mi)

Population (December 2020)
  - Total: 1,556
  - Density: 6.188/km^{2} (16.03/sq mi)
- Time zone: UTC+01:00 (CET)
  - Summer (DST): UTC+02:00 (CEST)
- SFOS number: 3792
- ISO 3166 code: CH-GR
- Localities: Bondo, Ca d'Farett, Castasegna, Muntac, Roticcio, Soglio, Spino, Stampa and Vicosoprano
- Website: https://comunedibregaglia.ch/

Bregaglia (Italian and Romansh: Bregaglia) is a municipality in the Maloja Region in the canton of Grisons in Switzerland. It was formed by the 2010 merger of the municipalities of Bondo, Castasegna, Soglio, Stampa and Vicosoprano, all located in the Val Bregaglia.

Bregaglia is the only Italian-speaking municipality in Switzerland in which the majority of the population is Protestant.

== History ==
=== Bondo ===
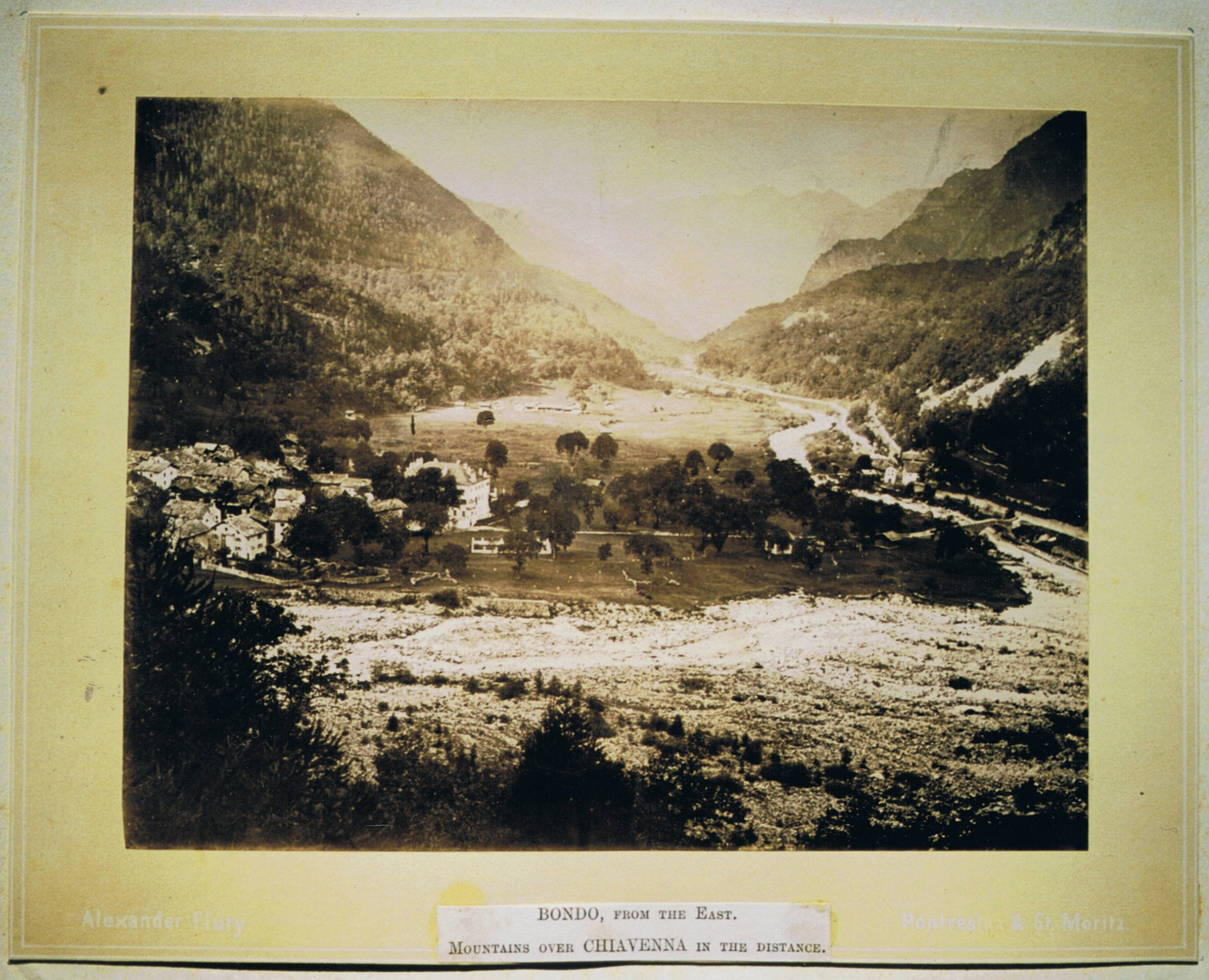
View of Bondo from the north, c. 1870

Aerial view (1954)

Under the Carolingian dynasty Bondo belonged to the Ministerium Bergallia, which was a dependant of the early Bishops of Chur, though after 960 it was owned directly by the Bishop. The valley church of S. Maria at Castelmur is first mentioned in 988, while the village church for Bondo, S. Martino, was consecrated in 1250. During the High Middle Ages Bondo was part of several villages that were collectively known as di là dell'acqua (‘across the water’), which were part of the district of Sotto Porta/Unterporta. In 1367 Bondo, together with the rest of Sotto Porta/Unterporta, joined the League of God's House (German: Gotteshausbund). In 1380 it was first mentioned under the name of Bondo. In German it was also known as Bundth while in Romansh it was known as Buond.

In 1552 the Protestant Reformation reached the village. During the 16th century some of the population left Bondo to Italy, and later to eastern Europe (either as bakers or soldiers). This trend has continued into the 20th century, except many now leave for northern Grisons or the rest of Switzerland.

During the Thirty Years' War the Three Leagues were rocked by the Bündner Wirren or Confusion of the Leagues, as the decentralized leagues fought each other over religion and politics. In 1621, during the Confusion, Spanish troops burned the entire town to the ground, destroying about 248 structures. The town was rebuilt along new central streets.

=== Castasegna ===
Castasegna is first mentioned in 1374 as Castexegnia.

Castasegna has the largest Chestnut forest in Europe, known as Brentan. The town's name means chestnut grove and the tree is featured on the coat of arms.

=== Soglio ===
Soglio is first mentioned in 1186 as de Solio.

=== Stampa ===
Stampa is first mentioned after 1354 as Stamppa.

=== Vicosoprano ===
Vicosoprano is first mentioned in 1096 as Vicus Supranus.

== Geography ==
Bregaglia had an area, (as of the 2004/09 survey) of 251.45 km^{2} (97.09 sq mi). Of this area, about 14.1% is used for agricultural purposes, while 21.6% is forested. Of the rest of the land, 0.9% is settled (buildings or roads) and 63.4% is unproductive land. Over the past two decades (1979/85-2004/09) the amount of land that is settled has increased by 37 ha (91 acres) and the agricultural land has decreased by 355 ha (880 acres).

== Demographics ==
Bregaglia has a population (as of December 2020) of 1,556. As of 2014, 13.4% of the population are resident foreign nationals. Over the last 4 years (2010-2014) the population has changed at a rate of -3.62%. The birth rate in the municipality, in 2014, was 7.7, while the death rate was 11.6 per thousand residents.

As of 2014, children and teenagers (0–19 years old) make up 16.6% of the population, while adults (20–64 years old) are 59.2% and seniors (over 64 years old) make up 24.2%. In 2015 there were 608 single residents, 726 people who were married or in a civil partnership, 124 widows or widowers and 78 divorced residents.

In 2014 there were 692 private households in Bregaglia with an average household size of 2.21 persons. In 2013 the rate of construction of new housing units per 1000 residents was 1.28. The vacancy rate for the municipality, in 2015, was 0.87%.

== Historic population ==
The historical population is given in the following chart:

== Heritage sites of national significance ==
The Castelmur medieval fortifications, the church of S. Maria and the Palazzo Salis in Bondo, the Casa Antonio No. 139, the Casa Battista no. 131, the Casa Di Mezzo No. 137 and the Cas’Alta No. 120 in Soglio and the Palazzo Castelmur in Stampa are listed as Swiss heritage sites of national significance.

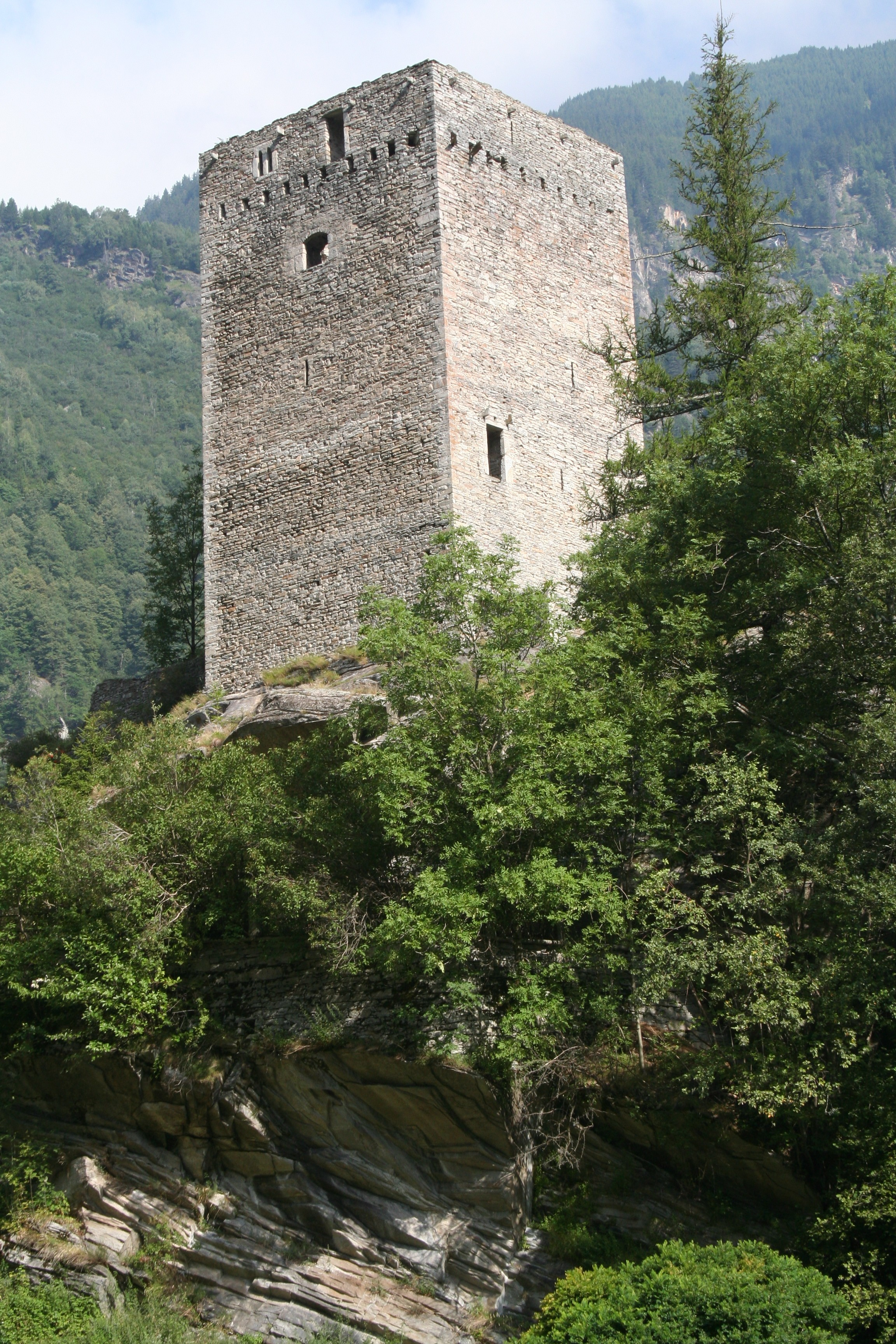
Castelmur Castle a Roman way-station and medieval fortress

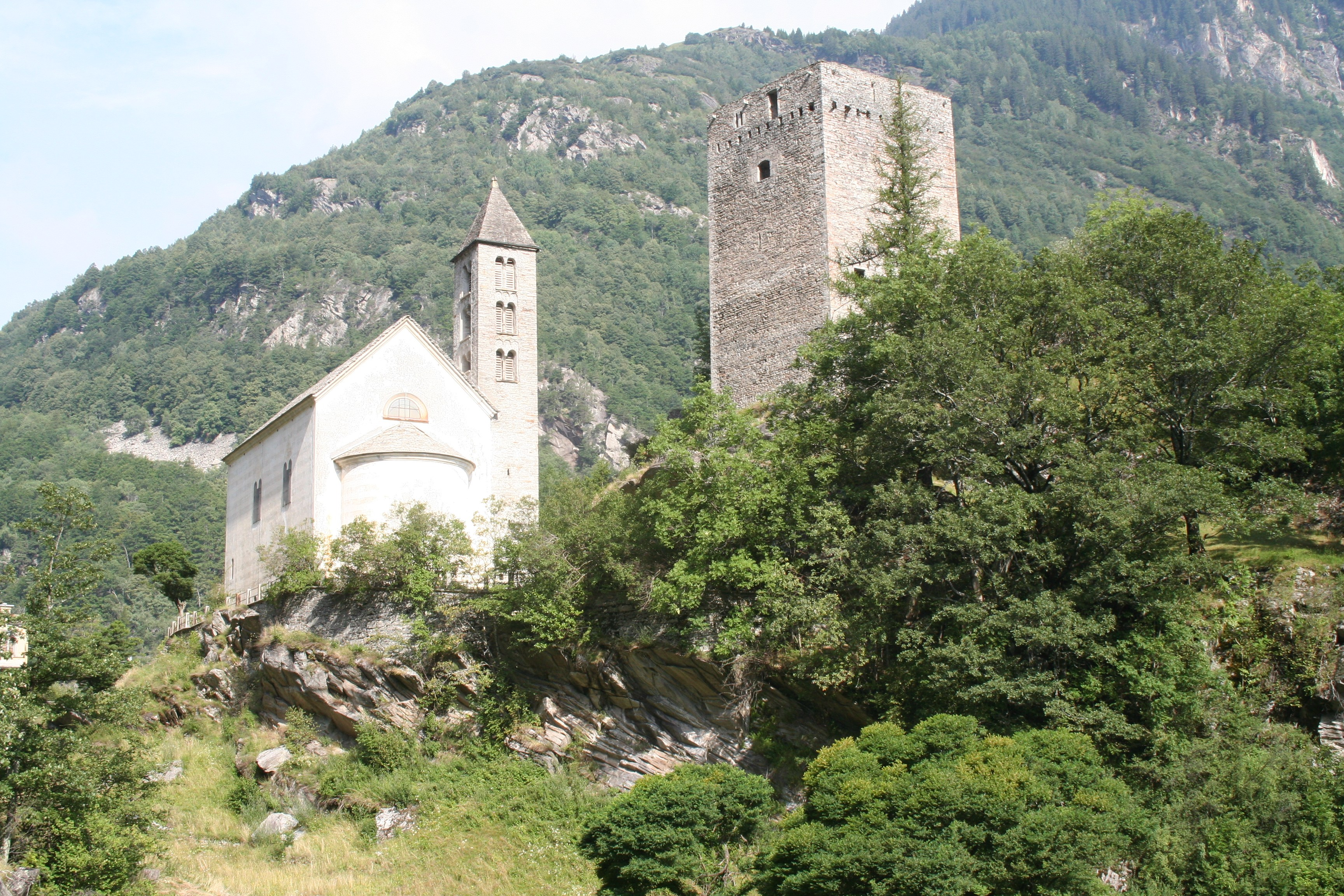
Swiss Reformed Church di Nossa Donna

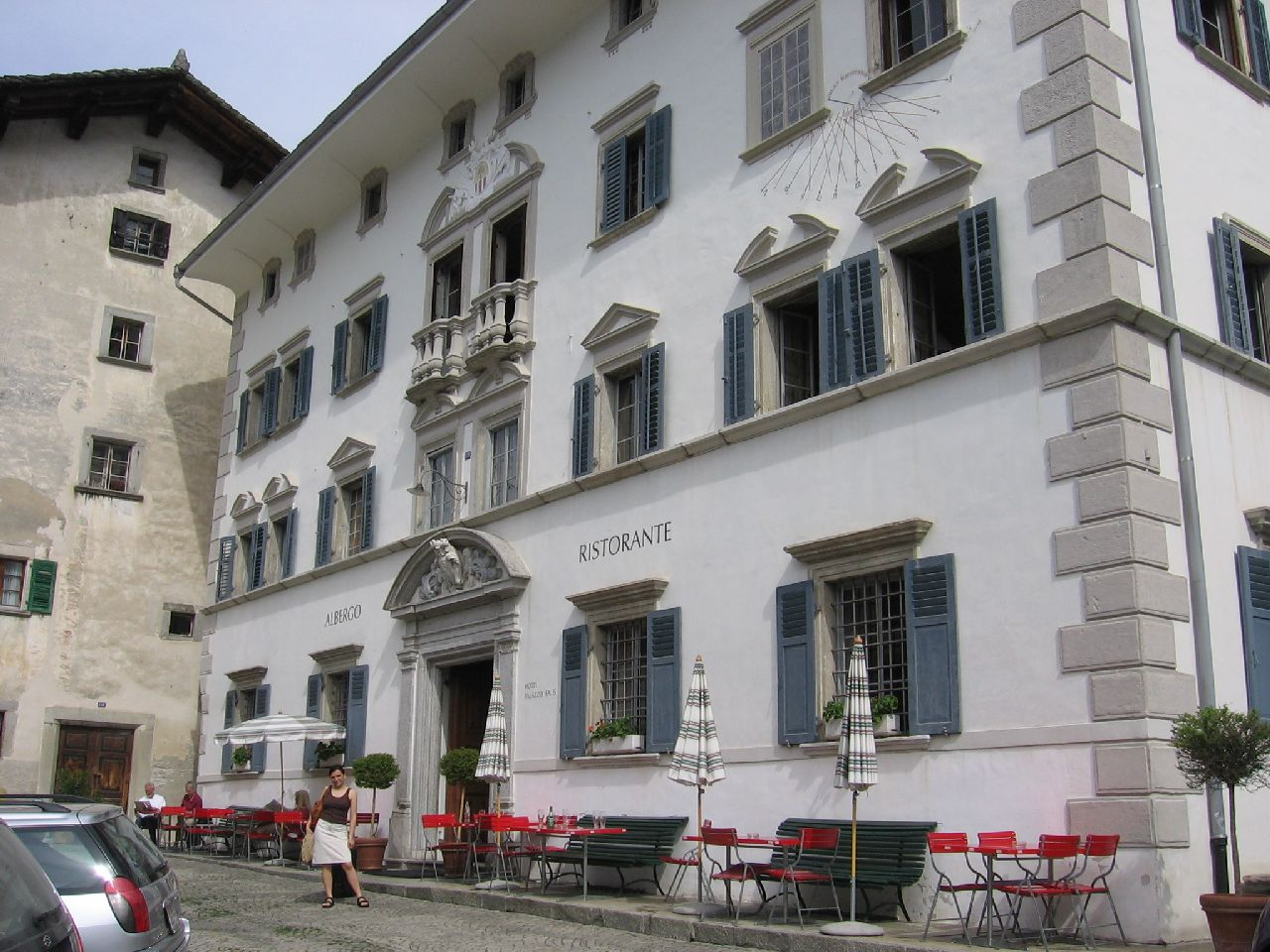
Palazzo Salis

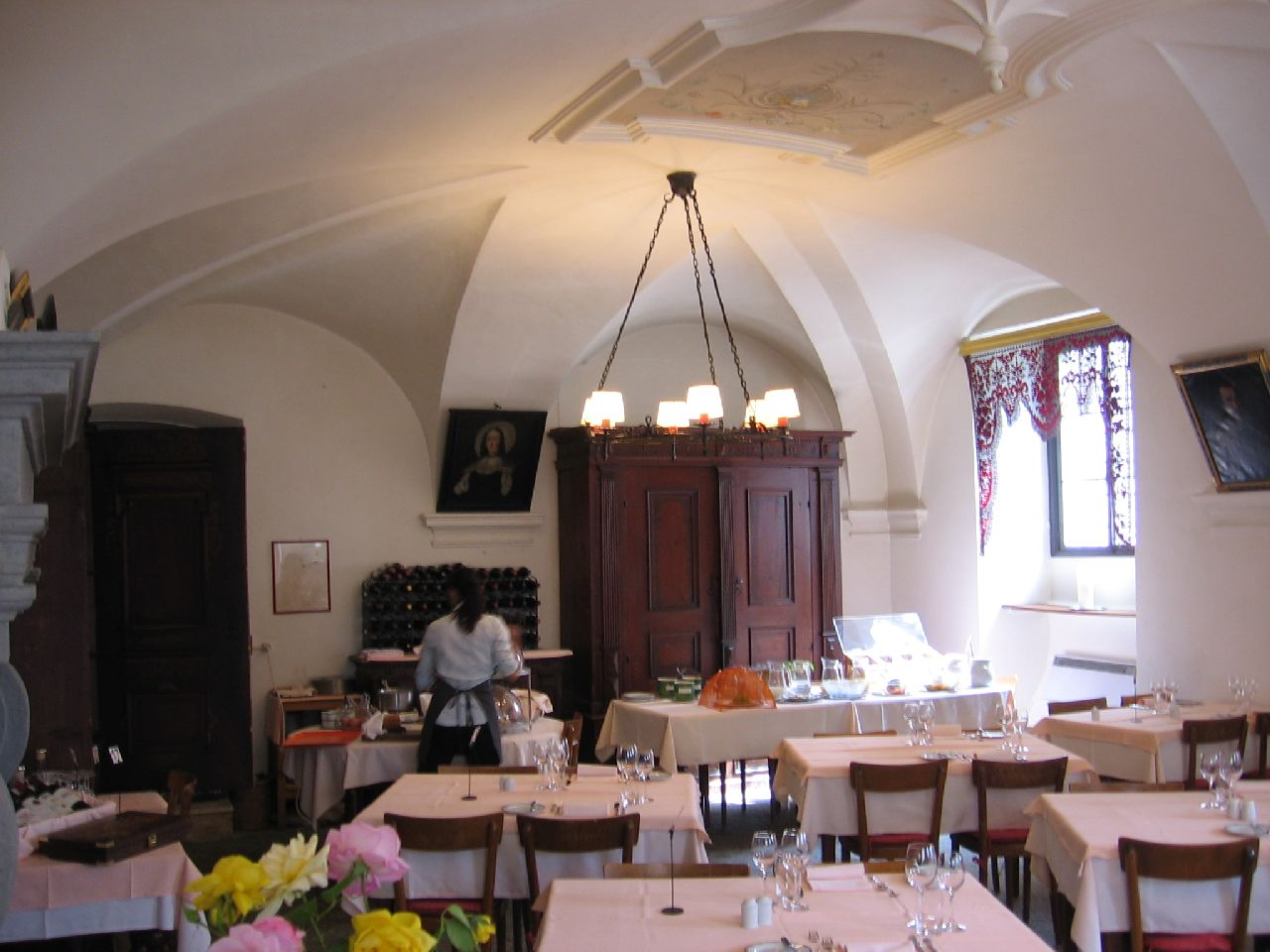
Dining room of Hotel Palazzo Salis

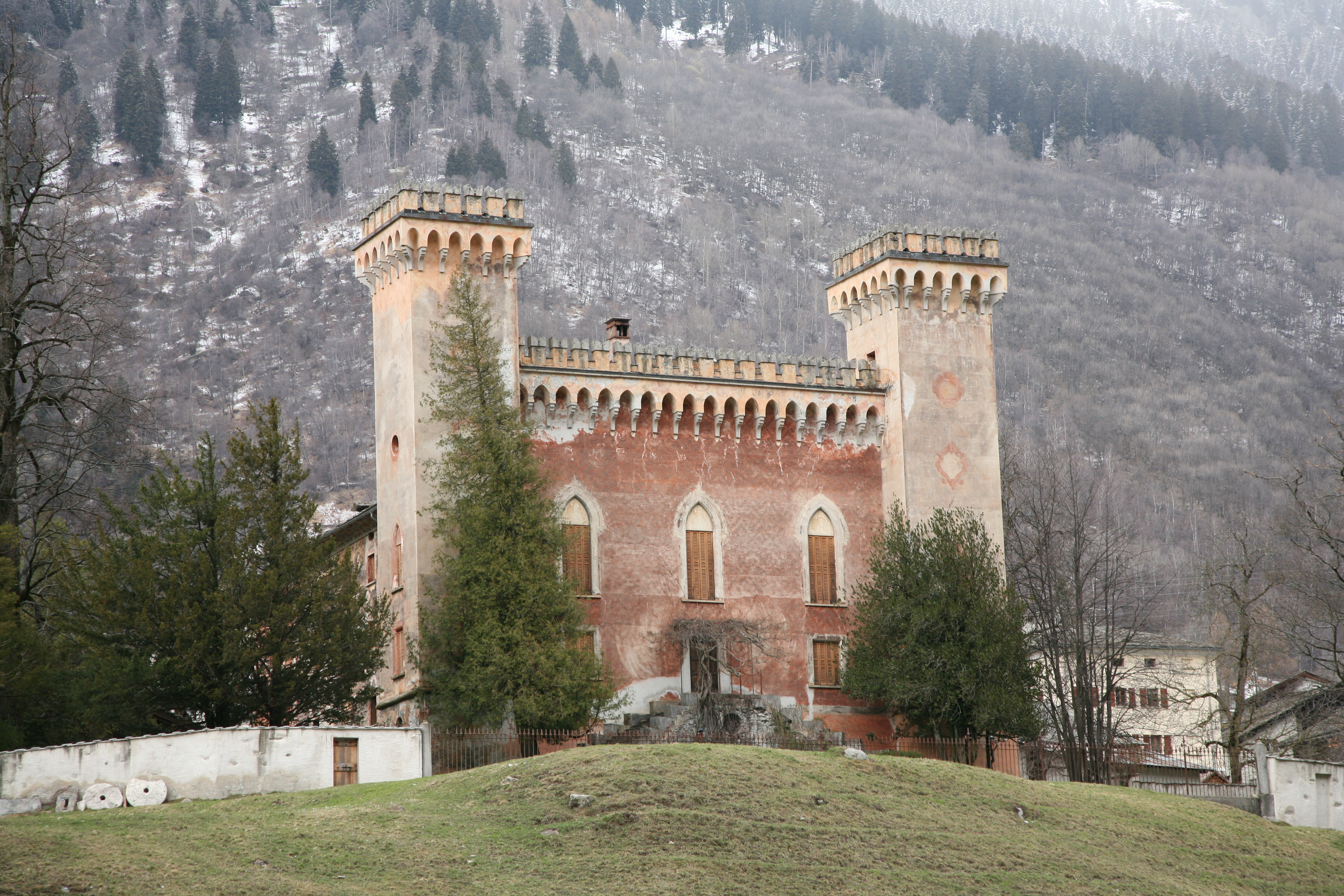
Palazzo Castelmur

The church of S. Maria in Castelmur was largely rebuilt in the 19th century, but still has its Romanesque campanile. S. Maria in Bondo also has a Romanesque bell tower. This church was restored in the 17th century but retains an important late 15th-century fresco cycle. The remains of the painter Varlin are interred in the nearby cemetery. Further notable buildings include the Casa Molinari, the Palazzo Scartazzini of 1690, the Palazzo Scartazzini am Platz (formerly Cortini) of 1763 and the Palazzo Salis; this last was begun by Jerome de Salis-Soglio in 1765 for his wife Mary and completed by their son in 1774. There is also a group of crotti towards Promontagno. In the twentieth century the painter Varlin captured much of the spirit of the village.

== Economy ==
As of 2014, there were a total of 896 people employed in the municipality. Of these, a total of 104 people worked in 31 businesses in the primary economic sector. A vast majority (81.7%) of the primary sector employees worked in very small businesses (less than ten employees). The remainder worked in 1 small business with a total of 19 employees. The secondary sector employed 306 workers in 45 separate businesses. A minority (44.4%) of the secondary sector employees worked in very small businesses. There were 9 small businesses with a total of 170 employees. Finally, the tertiary sector provided 486 jobs in 147 businesses. There were 6 small businesses with a total of 142 employees.

In 2014 a total of 1.3% of the population received social assistance. In the second quarter of 2016 an average of 370 workers commuted from outside Switzerland to work in the municipality, representing a large minority of the employees.

In 2015 local hotels had a total of 41,439 overnight stays, of which 31.4% were international visitors.

Elektrizitätswerk der Stadt Zürich (EWZ) operates a power plant in Castasegna.

== Politics ==
In the 2015 federal election the most popular party was the FDP with 28.3% of the vote. The next three most popular parties were the SVP (28.2%), the BDP (21.5%) and the SP (12.2%). In the federal election, a total of 554 votes were cast, and the voter turnout was 46.1%. The 2015 election saw a large change in the voting when compared to 2011. The percentage of the vote received by the FDP increased from 20.5% in 2011 to 28.3% in 2015, while the percentage that the SP received dropped from 17.3% to 12.2%.

== Crime ==
In 2014 the crime rate, of the over 200 crimes listed in the Swiss Criminal Code (running from murder, robbery and assault to accepting bribes and election fraud), in Bregaglia was 15.3 per thousand residents or about 23.7% of the average rate in the entire country. During the same period, the rate of drug crimes was 23 per thousand residents which was over twice the national rate. The rate of violations of immigration, visa and work permit laws was 4.5 per thousand residents. This rate is 246.2% greater than the rate in the district and 275.0% greater than the cantonal rate.

== Notable residents ==
Soglio village is the commune of origin for the Salis family, one of the oligarch families of the Grisons. There are several Salis houses in the village: Casa Alta; Casa Battista; Casa di Mezzo; and Casa Antonio. The Casa Battista is now a hotel – Hotel Palazzo Salis (formerly Pensione Willy) – while the others are tenements. For centuries the Salis family fortunes influenced the region, and the bars from the family arms are present in the coat of arms of the municipality, below the capricorn, which indicates church membership.

One family of famous artists, the Giacometti, come from Stampa. The most famous members of the family are:

- Giovanni Giacometti (1868–1933)
- Augusto Giacometti (1877–1947), cousin of Giovanni
- Alberto Giacometti (1901–1966), son of Giovanni
- Diego Giacometti (1902–1985), son of Giovanni
- Bruno Giacometti (1907-2012), son of Giovanni

== Climate ==
Soglio has an average of 101.8 days of rain per year and on average receives 1,459 mm (57.4 in) of precipitation. The wettest month is May during which time Soglio receives an average of 179 mm (7.0 in) of precipitation. During this month there is precipitation for an average of 12.7 days. The driest month of the year is February with an average of 55 mm (2.2 in) of precipitation over 12.7 days.

Vicosoprano has an average of 111.4 days of rain per year and on average receives 1,492 mm (58.7 in) of precipitation. The wettest month is May during which time Vicosoprano receives an average of 185 mm (7.3 in) of precipitation. During this month there is precipitation for an average of 13.3 days. The driest month of the year is February with an average of 72 mm (2.8 in) of precipitation over 13.3 days.

== See also ==
- Italian Grisons
