= Maloja District =

Coordinates: 46°24′9″N 9°41′42″E

Maloja District Bezirk Maloja Distretto di Maloggia District da Malögia
- District
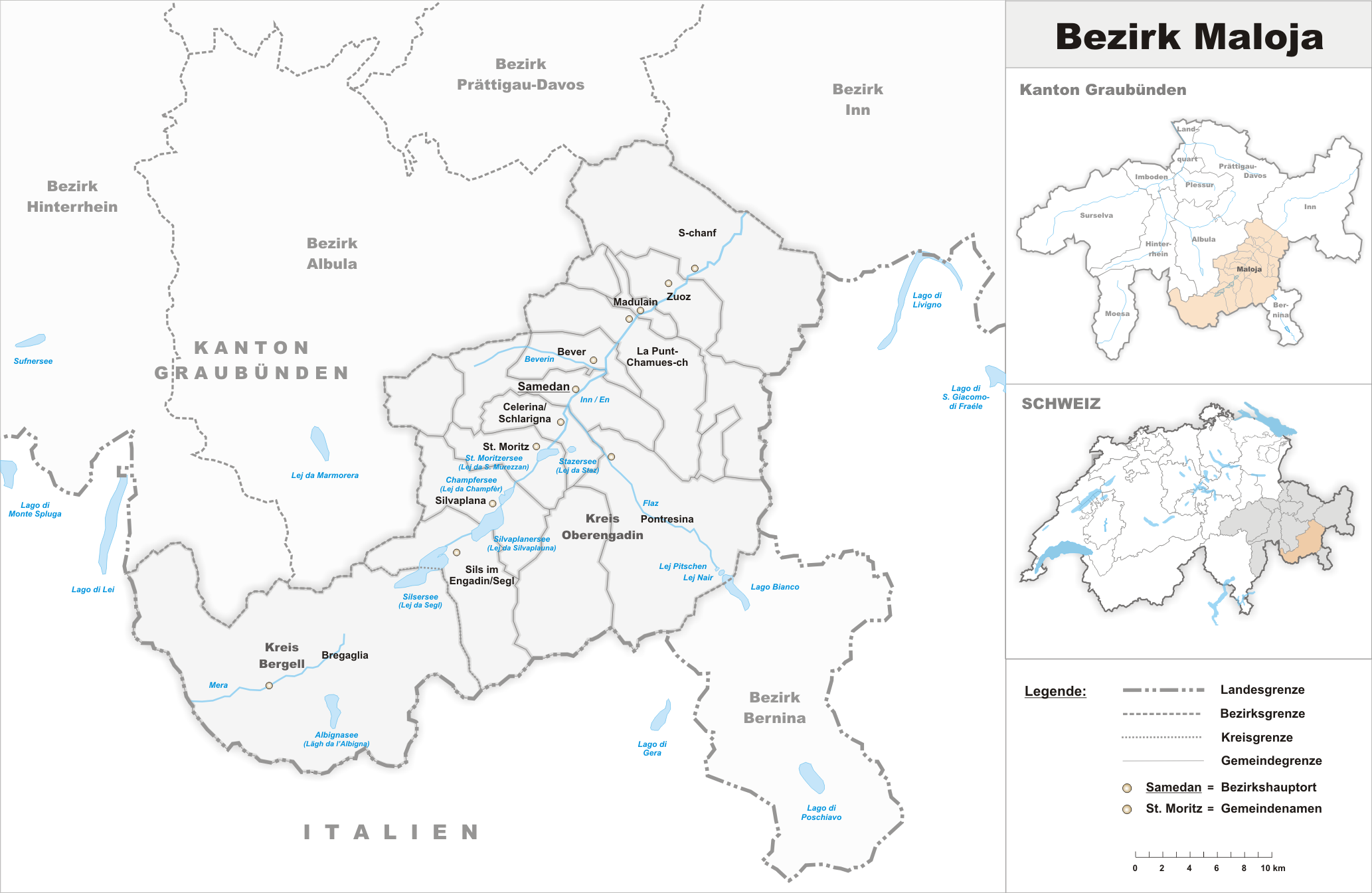
- Country: Switzerland
- Canton: Graubünden
- Capital: Samedan

Area
  - Total: 973.61 km^{2} (375.91 sq mi)

Population (2020)
  - Total: 18,698
  - Density: 19.205/km^{2} (49.740/sq mi)
- Time zone: UTC+1 (CET)
  - Summer (DST): UTC+2 (CEST)
- Municipalities: 16

Maloja District (Romansh: District da Malögia, Italian: Distretto di Maloja) is a former administrative district in the canton of Graubünden (or Grigioni), Switzerland. It had an area of 973.28 km^{2} (375.79 sq mi) and had a population of 18,698 in 2015. It was replaced with the Maloja Region on 1 January 2017 as part of a reorganization of the Canton.

It was trilingual, with official languages used by municipalities inside the district being, in order of dominance, German, Italian, and Romansh.

It consisted of two Kreis or circoli in Italian (sub-districts) and sixteen municipalities:

Bregaglia sub-district
Municipality	Population (31 December 2020)	Area (km^{2})
Bregaglia	1,556	251.45

Oberengadin sub-district
Municipality	Population (31 December 2020)	Area (km^{2})
Bever	584	45.65
Celerina/Schlarigna	1,484	24.03
La Punt Chamues-ch	686	63.22
Madulain	206	16.35
Pontresina	2,178	118.24
St. Moritz	4,945	28.69
Samedan	2,923	113.97
S-chanf	697	137.90
Sils im Engadin/Segl	715	63.54
Silvaplana	1,121	44.71
Zuoz	1,199	65.62

== Languages ==
All three of Graubünden's official languages: German, Romansh, and Italian, can be heard in the district. Except for the municipality of Bregaglia, the area was predominantly Romansh-speaking. Today, Romansh is spoken the least out of the three official languages of Maloja.

Languages of Maloja District, GR
Languages	Census 1970		Census 1980		Census 1990		Census 2000	
Languages	Number	Percent	Number	Percent	Number	Percent	Number	Percent
German	6,567	41.3%	7,269	44.7%	8,643	52.6%	10,474	55.7%
Romansh	3,340	21.0%	3,489	21.5%	2,722	16.6%	2,312	12.3%
Italian	4,950	31.1%	4,271	26.3%	3,705	22.6%	4,004	21.3%
TOTAL	15,910	100%	16,252	100%	16,420	100%	18,813	100%
