= Giacometti (surname) =

Giacometti is an Italian language surname derived from the name Giacomo.

The surname may refer to:

- Alberto Giacometti (1901–1966), a Swiss sculptor, painter, draughtsman, and printmaker
- Augusto Giacometti (1877–1947), a Swiss painter; 2nd cousin of Giovanni Giacometti
- Bruno Giacometti (1907–2012), a Swiss architect; the brother of Alberto and Diego Giacometti
- Diego Giacometti (1902–1985), a Swiss sculptor and designer, the younger brother of Alberto Giacometti
- Giovanni Giacometti (1868–1933), a Swiss painter; the father of Alberto, Diego, and Bruno Giacometti
- John Giacometti (1936–2006), an Italian-Australian association football player
- Michel Giacometti (1929–1990), a French ethnomusicologist
- Paolo Giacometti (1816–1882), an Italian dramatist
- Roney "Giah" Giacometti (born 1974), a Brazilian composer, singer and guitarist
- Zaccaria Giacometti (1893–1970), a Swiss professor of constitutional law; the cousin of Alberto, Diego and Bruno Giacometti
