= Borgonovo =

Borgonovo may refer to:

- Borgonovo, Switzerland, village, part of the municipality of Bregaglia in the Maloja district of the Swiss canton Graubünden, Switzerland
- Borgonovo, Torricella Sicura, frazione in the Province of Teramo in the Abruzzo region of Italy
- Borgonovo Val Tidone, municipality in the Province of Piacenza in the Italian region Emilia-Romagna

== People ==
- Carlo Borgonovo
- Gianantonio Borgonovo
- Giovanni Borgonovo
- Pietro Borgonovo
- Stefano Borgonovo

== See also ==
- Borgo Nuovo
