= Bündner Kunstmuseum =

Swiss art museum

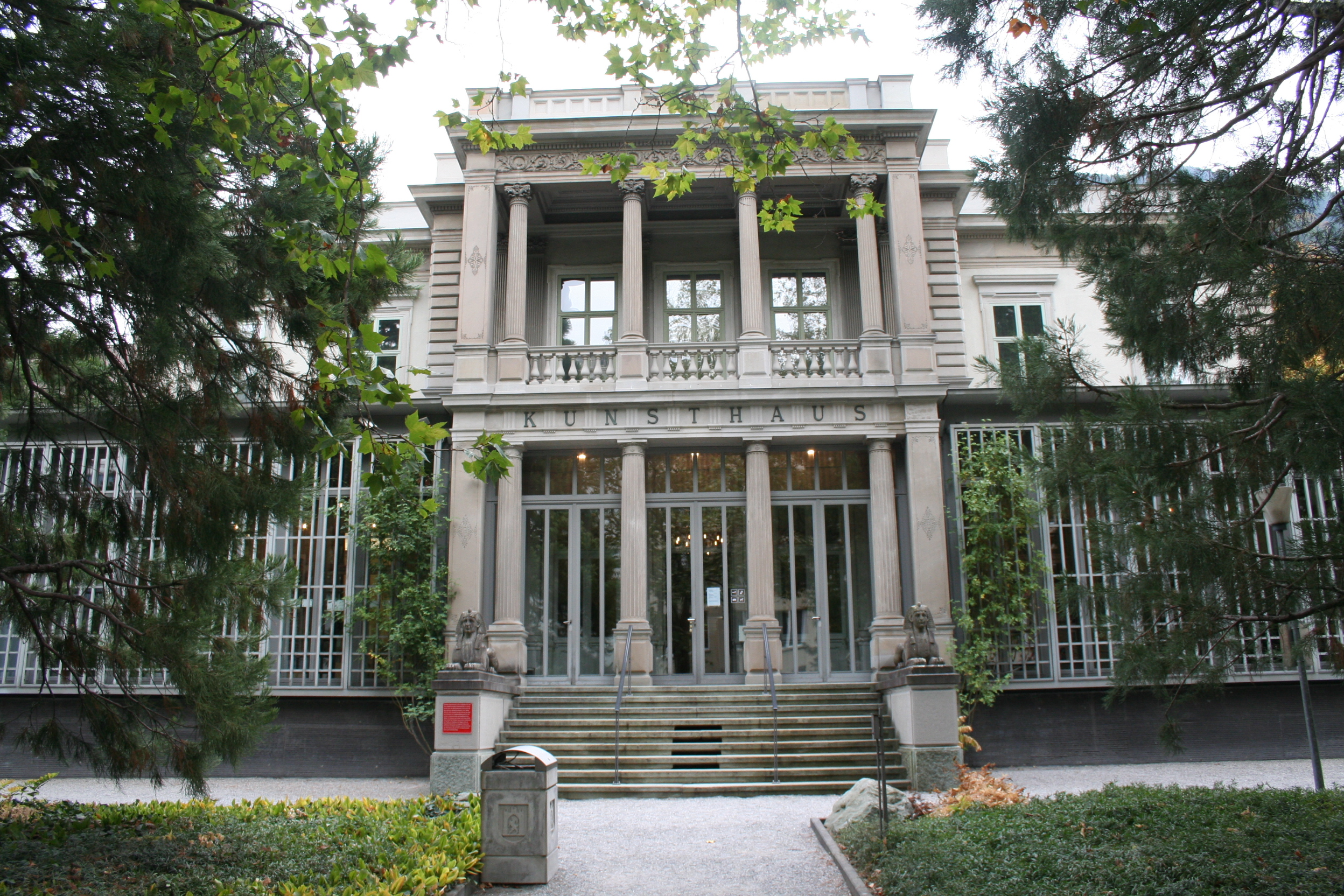
- Bündner Kunstmuseum, 2009
- Established: 1919
- Location: Bahnhofstrasse 35, 7000 Chur, Canton of Graubünden, Switzerland
- Coordinates: 46.851332°N 9.53236°E
- Type: Art museum
- Website: kunstmuseum.gr.ch

Bündner Kunstmuseum (English: Graubünden Art Museum) is an art museum in Chur, Switzerland, founded in 1919. It is housed in the historic Villa Planta and a modern extension building. The museum’s collection includes works by artists associated with the canton of Graubünden, including Angelica Kauffmann, members of the Giacometti family and Ernst Ludwig Kirchner.

== History ==
The museum occupies the Villa Planta, a mansion built between 1874 and 1876 for Jacques Ambrosius von Planta (1826–1901) and designed by the architect Johannes Ludwig. The Bündner Kunstmuseum was established there in 1919 by the Bündner Kunstverein (Graubünden Art Association).

Around 1927, the natural history holdings formerly associated with the institution were transferred to a neighbouring building to form the Natur- und Nationalpark-Museum. Between 1987 and 1990, the Villa Planta was renovated by the architects Peter Zumthor, Peter Calonder and Hans-Jörg Ruch. In 2016, the museum complex was expanded with a new building designed by the Spanish architectural firm Barozzi Veiga.

== Collection ==
The collection features works by artists connected to Graubünden as well as other significant figures in Swiss art. Artists represented include Angelica Kauffmann, Augusto Giacometti, Giovanni Segantini and Ernst Ludwig Kirchner.

== Selected exhibitions ==
In 2011, the museum hosted an exhibition featuring previously unpublished photographs and sketches related to the Swiss artist Alberto Giacometti, drawn from the collection of his wife Annette Giacometti.

In 2021, an exhibition dedicated to early panoramic works by the Graubünden painter Giovanni Giacometti brought together three of his large panoramic paintings for the first time.

In 2025, the museum marked the 125th anniversary of the Bündner Kunstverein with a jubilee exhibition that presented works by international artists alongside those with connections to Graubünden. In the same year, it also held an exhibition devoted to the Swiss sculptor and designer Diego Giacometti, described as the first comprehensive solo exhibition of his work in an art museum.

== See also ==
- List of museums in the Grisons
- List of museums in Switzerland
- Manor Cultural Prize
