= Giacobetti =

Giacobetti is an Italian surname. Notable people with the surname include:

- Francis Giacobetti (1939–2025), French photographer and film director
- Olivia Giacobetti (born 1966), French perfumer
- Tata Giacobetti (1922–1988), Italian singer

== See also ==
- Giacometti (surname)
