= Zaccaria Giacometti =

Swiss jurist (1893–1970)

Zaccaria Giacometti (26 September 1893 – 10 August 1970) was a Swiss scholar of constitutional law and professor at the University of Zurich.

== Biography ==
=== Early life in the Giacometti artist family ===
Zaccaria Giacometti was born in the canton Graubünden's southerly alpine valley Val Bregaglia to Zaccaria Giacometti, Sr. (1856-1897) and Cornelia Stampa (1868-1905). Orphaned at the age of 12, Zaccaria and his older brother Cornelio spent much of their childhood in the household of their aunt Anetta, and were raised as "older brothers“, so to speak, to their cousins (and later world-famous artists) Alberto Giacometti (1901–1966), Diego Giacometti (1902-1985), and Bruno Giacometti (1907-2012). After visiting a boarding school in Schiers and obtaining his Matura Diploma, Giacometti, interested in Theology and Philosophy, set out initially to study Philosophy.

=== Studies ===
In April 1914, Giacometti enrolled at the Faculty of Philosophy of the University of Basel, but soon thereafter enrolled at the Law Faculty in the winter term 1915/16. After a transfer to the University of Zurich in 1916, he concluded his studies there by obtaining a doctoral degree in law (Dr. iur.) in 1919 under the supervision of his mentor Fritz Fleiner (1867-1937).

=== University of Zurich ===
After serving in the Justice Department of the Federal Department of Justice and Police of Switzerland, Giacometti assisted Fleiner in the conclusion of his standard reference book on Swiss constitutional law. In 1927, he was appointed as Professor extraordinarius for public law and canon law at the University of Zurich. After acting as Dean of the Law Faculty for two years, Giacometti succeeded his mentor Fleiner and was appointed Professor ordinarius. In the years 1954/55, he was chancellor of the University of Zurich. In 1960, Giacometti fell ill and retired from his post. In 1962, he was awarded an honorary doctorate by the University of St. Gallen, but was unable to attend the ceremony due to his bad health. On 10 August 1970, Giacometti died in Zurich. He was buried in his native Val Bregaglia in Borgonovo. Giacometti’s heirs subsequently donated the Professor’s scientific library to the law library at the University of Zurich

== Work ==
In his work as a professor, Giacometti was a staunch defender of the rule of law and democracy. His liberal views on political philosophy were based on the writings of Immanuel Kant, and, to a lesser degree, on Hans Kelsen's neo-Kantianism. This was most apparent in Giacometti's strong criticism of the state of emergency declared by the Swiss government and the ensuing legislation during the interwar period. During this time, Giacometti regarded the Swiss Confederation as an authoritarian state with totalitarian tendencies.

== Selected publications ==
- Die Genesis von Cavours Formel Libera chiesa in libero stato. Zürich 1919 (Dissertation).
- Über die Grenzziehung zwischen Zivilrechts- und Verwaltungsrechtsinstituten in der Judikatur des schweizerischen Bundesgerichts. Tübingen 1924 (Habilitationsschrift).
- Die Auslegung der schweizerischen Bundesverfassung. Antrittsrede gehalten am 11. Juli 1925 (= Recht und Staat in Geschichte und Gegenwart. Bd. 39). Tübingen 1925.
- Quellen zur Geschichte der Trennung von Staat und Kirche. Tübingen 1926.
- Das öffentliche Recht der Schweizerischen Eidgenossenschaft, Sammlung der wichtigeren Bundesgesetze, Bundesbeschlüsse und Bundesverordnungen staatsrechtlichen und verwaltungsrechtlichen Inhalts, systematisch zusammengestellt, mit Verweisungen und Sachregister. Zürich 1930; 2. Auflage 1938.
- Die Verfassungsgerichtsbarkeit des Schweizerischen Bundesgerichtes: Die staatsrechtliche Beschwerde. Zürich 1933.
- Das Staatsrecht der schweizerischen Kantone. Zürich 1941; Nachdruck 1979.
- Das Vollmachtenregime der Eidgenossenschaft. Zürich 1945.
- Schweizerisches Bundesstaatsrecht, Neubearbeitung der ersten Hälfte des gleichnamigen Werkes von F. Fleiner, Nachdruck der Ausgabe von 1949. Zürich 1965; weitere Nachdrucke in den Jahren 1969, 1976 sowie 1978.
- Allgemeine Lehren des rechtsstaatlichen Verwaltungsrechts: Allgemeines Verwaltungsrecht des Rechtsstaates. Zürich 1960.
- Ausgewählte Schriften. Hrsg. von Alfred Kölz. Zürich 1994, mit einer Würdigung des Herausgebers (pp. 331 et seq.).

== Bibliography ==
- Christoph Bernoulli: Jugenderinnerungen an die Familie Giacometti, Frau Annetta Giacometti zum 90. Geburtstag gewidmet. In: Du, 22. Jg., Februar 1962, Nr. 252, pp. 16 et seq.
- Werner Kägi: Zum 60. Geburtstag am 26. September 1953. In: Neue Zürcher Zeitung. 26 September 1953, Nr. 2224, Blatt 5, Morgenausgabe (erster Teil); Neue Zürcher Zeitung. 26 September 1953, Nr. 2225, Blatt 6, Morgenausgabe (zweiter Teil).
- Werner Kägi: Zaccaria Giacometti. Zum 70. Geburtstag am 26. September. In: Neue Zürcher Zeitung. 26 September 1963, Issue 3816, page 4, Morgenausgabe.
- Werner Kägi: Zaccaria Giacometti – Das Lebenswerk des schweizerischen Staats- und Verwaltungsrechtlers. In: Neue Zürcher Zeitung. 6 September 1970, Issue 413, pp. 51 et seq.
- Andreas Kley: Zaccaria Giacometti – Staatsrechtslehre als Kunst? In: Schweizerische Juristen-Zeitung. Vol. 107 (2011), pp. 429–439.
- Andreas Kley: Geschichte des öffentlichen Rechts der Schweiz. Zürich/St. Gallen 2011.
- Andreas Kley: Bregaglia – Zurigo: Luoghi di vita e di attività del docente di diritto costituzionale Zaccaria Giacometti (1893–1970). In: Quaderni grigionitaliani. Vol. 82 (2013), H. 1, pp. 37–64.
- Andreas Kley: Von Stampa nach Zürich. Der Staatsrechtler Zaccaria Giacometti, sein Leben und Werk und seine Bergeller Künstlerfamilie. Zürich 2014.
- Renato Stampa: L’uomo e il giurista. In: Quaderni grigionitaliani. Vol. 40 (1971), part 2, pp. 85 et seq.
