= Borgonovo, Switzerland =

Coordinates: 46°21′N 9°36′E

Borgonovo
- Former municipality
- Location of Borgonovo
- Location within Switzerland Location within Canton of Graubünden
- Country: Switzerland
- Canton: Graubünden
- District: Maloja
- Time zone: UTC+01:00 (CET)
  - Summer (DST): UTC+02:00 (CEST)
- ISO 3166 code: CH-GR
- Surrounded by: Castasegna, Novate Mezzola (IT-SO), Soglio, Stampa, Val Masino (IT-SO), Vicosoprano, Villa di Chiavenna (IT-SO)
- Website: www.bondo.ch

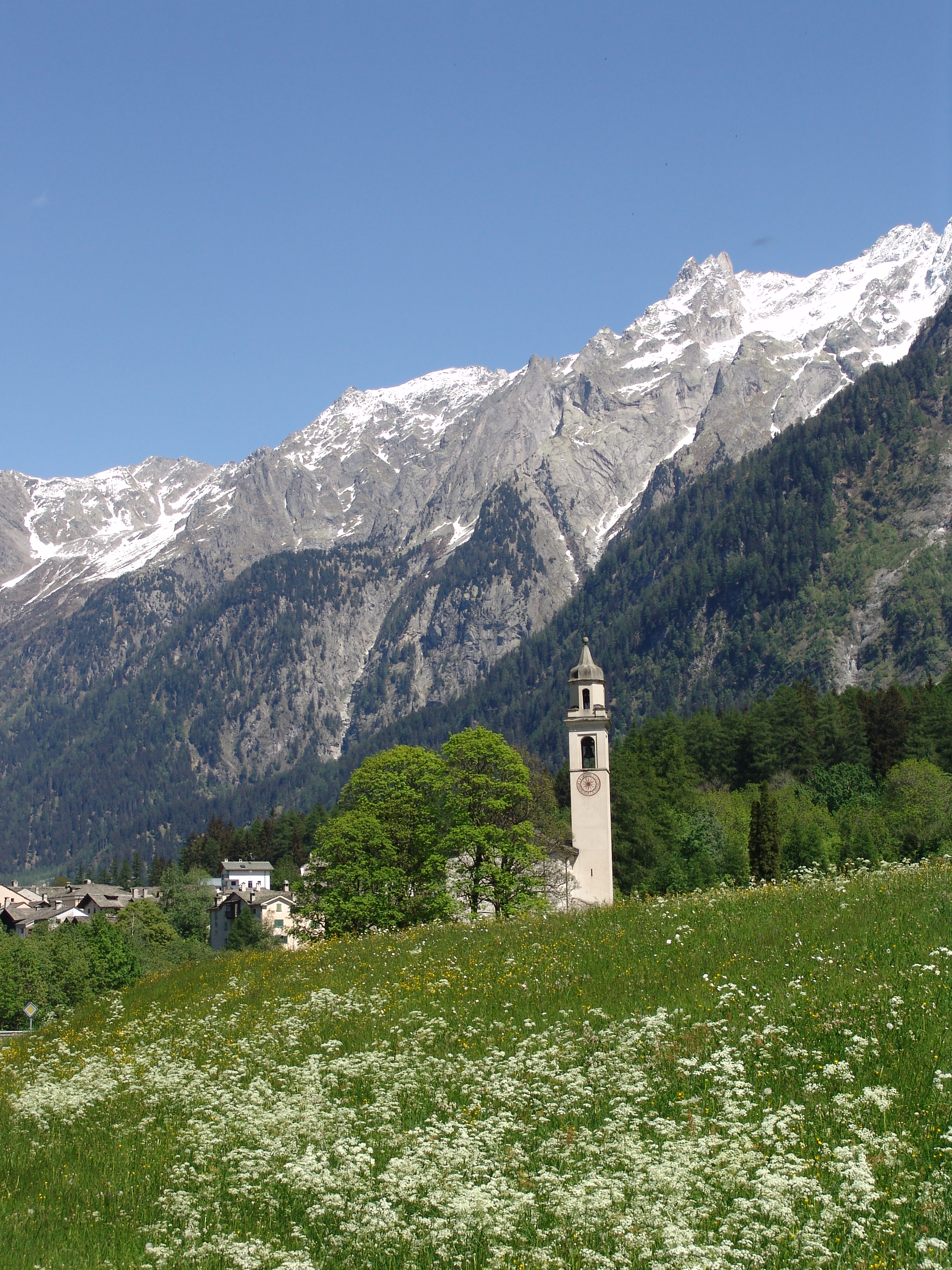
Reformed church San Giorgio

Borgonovo is a small village, formerly part of the municipality of Stampa. Since 2010 it is now part of the municipality of Bregaglia in the Maloja district of the Swiss canton Graubünden, Switzerland.

== Notable people ==
- Alberto Giacometti, 1901 – 1966, artist, born and buried in the San Giorgio church of Borgonovo
- Giovanni Giacometti, 1868 – 1933, a Swiss painter, born in Borgonovo, the father of artists Alberto and Diego Giacometti and architect Bruno Giacometti
