= Tête qui regarde =

Sculpture by Alberto Giacometti

- Artist: Alberto Giacometti
- Completion date: 1928–29
- Catalogue: AGD 460, 861, 4054
- Medium: sculpture
- Movement: Cubist
- Subject: abstracted bust of a human head

Tête qui regarde [tɛt ki ʁə.ɡaʁd], also known as Gazing Head, is a 1928–29 sculpture by Alberto Giacometti. It has been described as Giacometti's first truly original work.

== Description ==
The Cubist sculpture is a simplified, abstracted bust of a human head, inspired by primitive art and archaeological specimens: parallels have been drawn with the features of human figurines in Cycladic art. The head is flattened into an irregular quadrilateral plaque with slightly curving sides, which rests on an integral pedestal and base. The plate has two shallow elliptical depressions, a deeper vertical along the left edge and a shallower horizontal one inside the top edge, interpreted as the nose and an eye.

Copies of the sculpture were made in terracotta, plaster, marble, and bronze. A small preliminary terracotta version, with the vertical depression to the right rather than the left, measures 4.21 in × 3.42 in × 1.69 in (10.7 cm × 8.7 cm × 4.3 cm). Different plaster and bronze copies of the full-size sculpture have slightly different measurements, all around 40 cm × 36.5 cm × 6.5 cm (15.7 in × 14.4 in × 2.6 in).

== Origin ==
Giacometti had been working on portraits of his father Giovanni in 1927 before moving on to Tête qui regarde. Early examples were made in 1928, and the sculpture was first exhibited beside works of Massimo Campigli at the Jeanne Bucher Gallery in Paris in 1929. A plaster copy was bought by Charles de Noailles, bringing Giacometti into a circle of Surrealists that included André Masson, André Breton, Jacques Prévert, Yves Tanguy, Robert Desnos, Raymond Queneau, Michel Leiris, and Georges Bataille. Bronzes were cast in 1956.

== Examples ==
Examples are held in several public collections, with a marble example held by the Stedelijk Museum in Amsterdam, and a plaster example at the Fondation Giacometti in Paris. The Museum of Modern Art in New York has a plaster model and a cast from a series of six bronzes.

A plaster example was the subject of an episode of the BBC television programme, Fake or Fortune?. It had been damaged and repaired (more than once) and covered by white emulsion paint. In the original airing of the programme in 2018, the Giacometti Foundation took a preliminary view that the sculpture may have been an original work, but the extensive damage made it difficult to justify that conclusion. A revised and updated version of the programme was shown in 2019. The paint had been removed, revealing a Giacometti signature and date. The work was authenticated by the Foundation and sold at Christies for over half a million pounds.
