= Ingrid Donat =

Ingrid Donat (born 1957) is a French-Swedish sculptor and designer.

== Career ==
Donat is known for her geometric designs, working in bronze among other materials. Donat studied sculpture at the École des Beaux-Arts. There, she trained under sculptor Sylva Bernt and later developed a close friendship with Diego Giacometti, which led to her work in furniture design. In conversation with artist Amadour, Donat shared, "I always create my ideas based on my own home... my concept is to create a lifestyle." She is influenced by André Groult, Armand-Albert Rateau, and Jeanne Lanvin. Her work is held in the permanent collection of the Musée des Arts Décoratifs, Paris, and has been exhibited through institutions including the Musée d'Art Moderne de Paris.
