= Herbert Lust =

American writer and art collector (1926–2026)

- Lust in his early 20s
- Born: October 31, 1926 Chicago, Illinois, United States
- Died: May 12, 2026 (aged 99) Greenwich, Connecticut, United States
- Occupation: Author; Art collector; Investment banker
- Education: University of Chicago (M.A.)
- Notable works: Violence and Defiance; Giacometti: The Complete Graphics and 15 Drawings

Herbert Confield Lust (October 31, 1926 – May 12, 2026) was an American art collector known for assembling a private collection of twentieth-century modern and contemporary art. Lust was also an investment banker, former literature professor, writer and art scholar, known for his writings on the Swiss sculptor and painter Alberto Giacometti, who he befriended while attending Sorbonne in Paris.

== Early life and education ==
Herbert Lust was born in Chicago on October 31, 1926, and was raised on a farm in Indiana. He earned a master's degree in philosophy from the University of Chicago in 1948. While in Paris on a Fulbright Scholarship, Lust studied comparative literature at Sorbonne University, researching the influence of the American novel on contemporary French literature. He met Alberto Giacometti at a luncheon and fabricated a story about his past that interested the artist. Giacometti invited Lust to his studio, after which a long-term relationship developed. After returning to the United States, Lust taught English at the University of Chicago until 1957 when he became an investment banker and began collecting art seriously.

== Art collecting ==
Lust became a collector of modern and contemporary art, acquiring works by artists including Giacometti, Alexander Calder, Robert Indiana, and others. In 2020, it was estimated that Lust's collection contained over 1,000 works, housed in his home in Greenwich, Connecticut, and in his pied-à-terre in Manhattan. He donated more than 200 photographs to the Hirshhorn Museum and Sculpture Garden in Washington and over 200 works by Giacometti to the Tel Aviv Museum.

== Writing ==
=== Violence and Defiance ===
Lust authored a novel titled Violence and Defiance, first published in 1983 by Station Hill Press. The novel is in part a work of autofiction, and is described by the publisher as "created by the use of an actual crisis inside and around the author's life as subplot to the fiction. The time span in the fiction is meshed to a contiguous time span of autobiographical time by a voice situated in the curious ethics of 'gut time'."

=== Art scholarship ===
Lust has written about Hans Bellmer, Robert Indiana, Enrico Baj, and Carlotta Corpron. He authored Giacometti: The Complete Graphics and 15 Drawings, first published in 1970 (OCLC 126137) and revised in 1991 as Giacometti: The Complete Graphics (OCLC 24843824).

== Personal life and death ==
Lust's first two marriages, to Frances Hutchins and Jean Marianne McDonald, ended in divorce. In 1963, he married Virginia Wertheimer, with whom he ran the Virginia Lust Gallery in Manhattan in the 1980s and 1990s. She died in 2014. Herbert Lust died at his home in Greenwich, Connecticut, on May 12, 2026.

== Bibliography ==
=== Fiction ===
- Violence and Defiance. Station Hill Press, 1983. ISBN 9780930794903, 9780930794910

=== Art scholarship ===
- Lust, Herbert. A Dozen Principles for Art Investment (Chicago: Galerie le chat Bernard, 1969)
- Lust, Herbert. Giacometti: The Complete Graphics and 15 Drawings. Tudor Publishing Company, 1970; revised edition, Alan Wofsy Fine Arts, 1991. ISBN 9781556600937
- Lust, Herbert. Enrico Baj: Dada Impressionist -A Catalogue Raisonne for the Paintings (Turin: Giulio Bolaffi, 1973)
