= Karl Egender =

Swiss architect

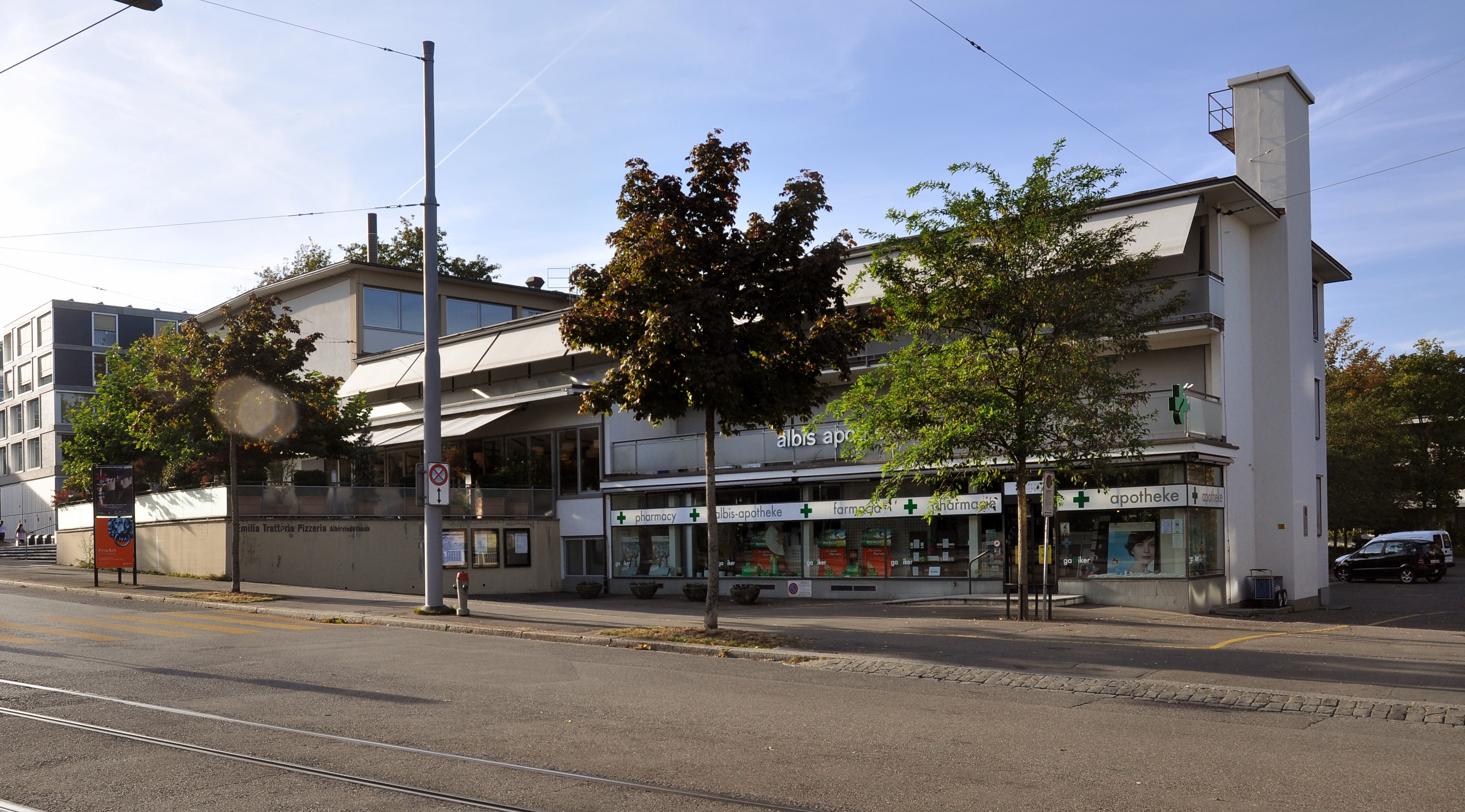
Albisriederhaus from 1935 (with Wilhelm Müller)

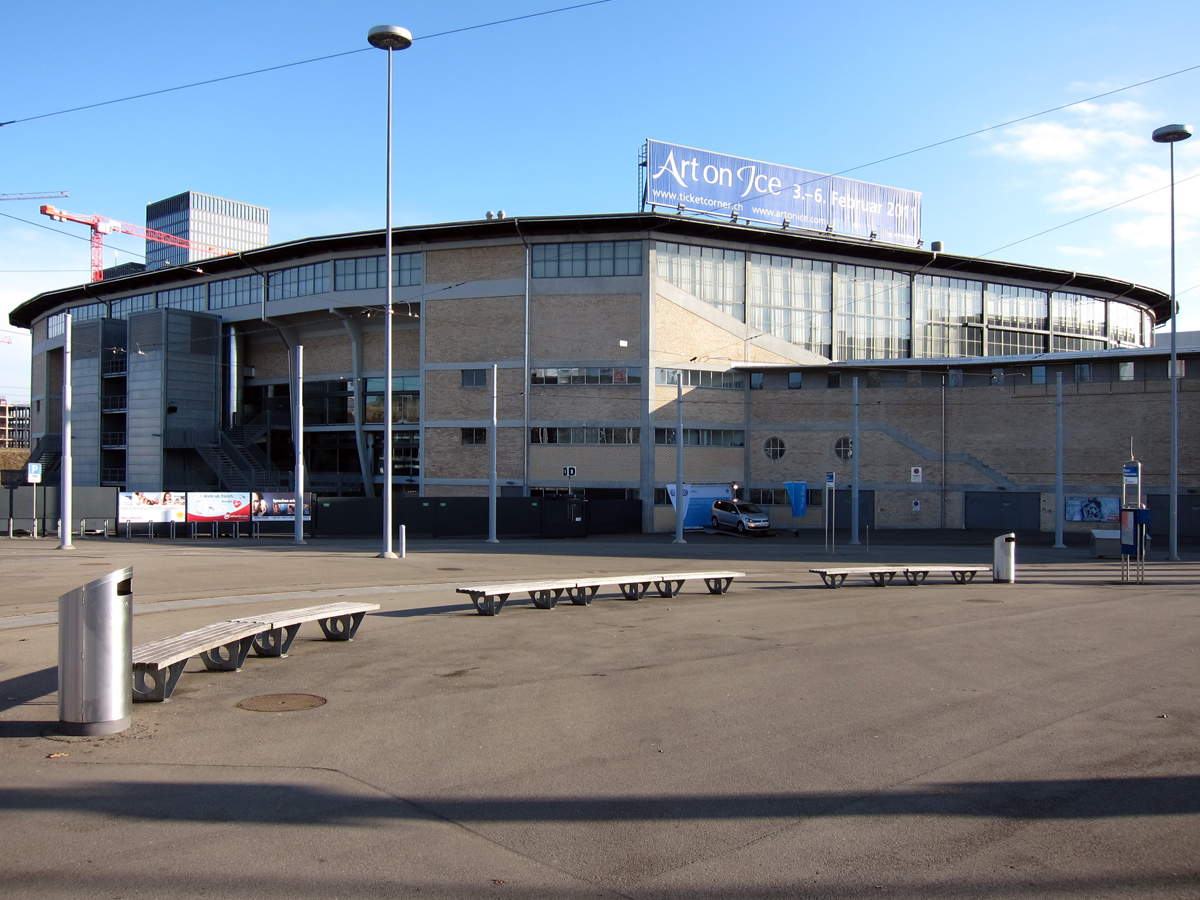
Hallenstadion in Zurich Oerlikon, built 1938–39 (with Wilhelm Müller and Bruno Giacometti)

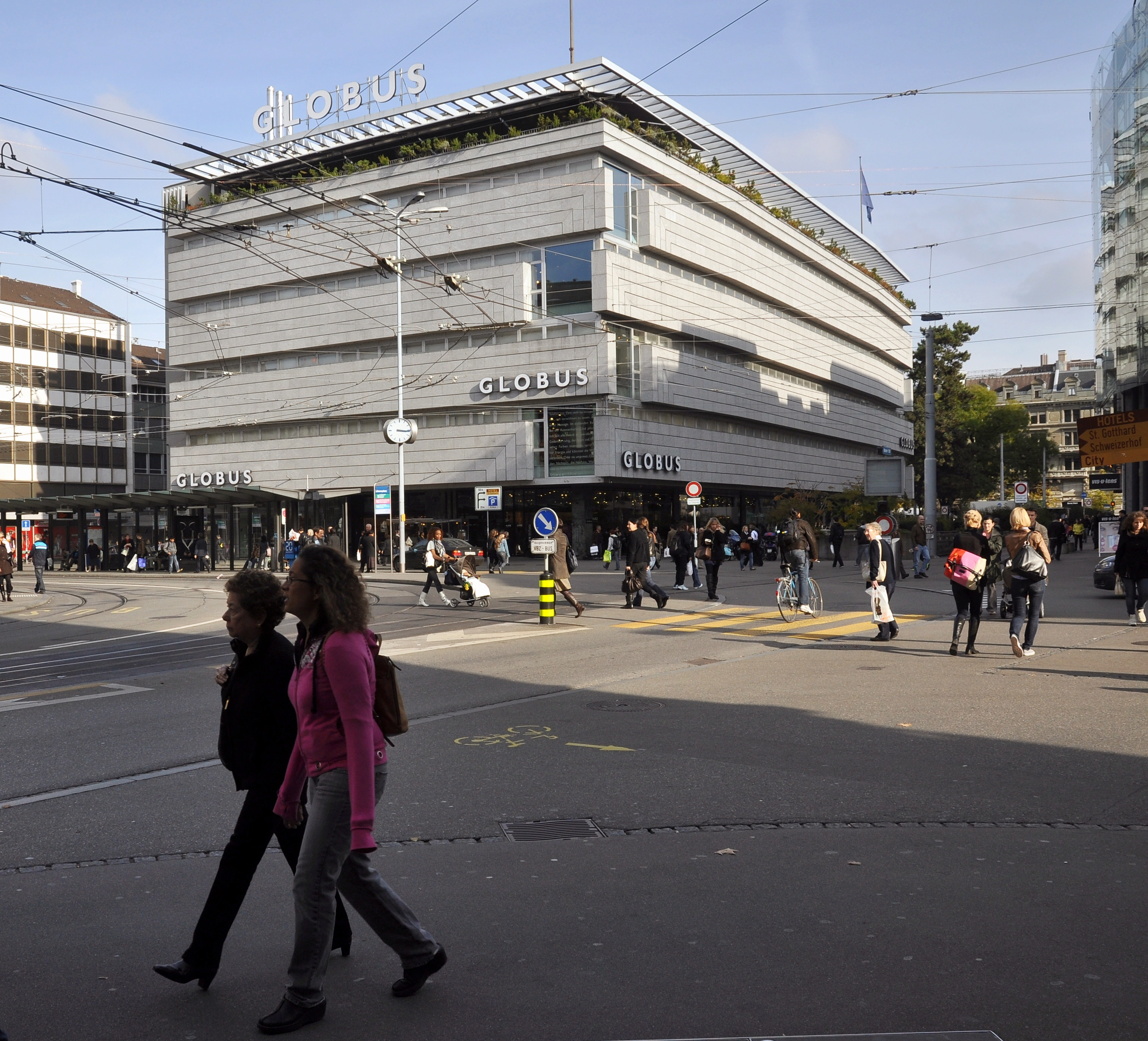
Globus department store from 1969

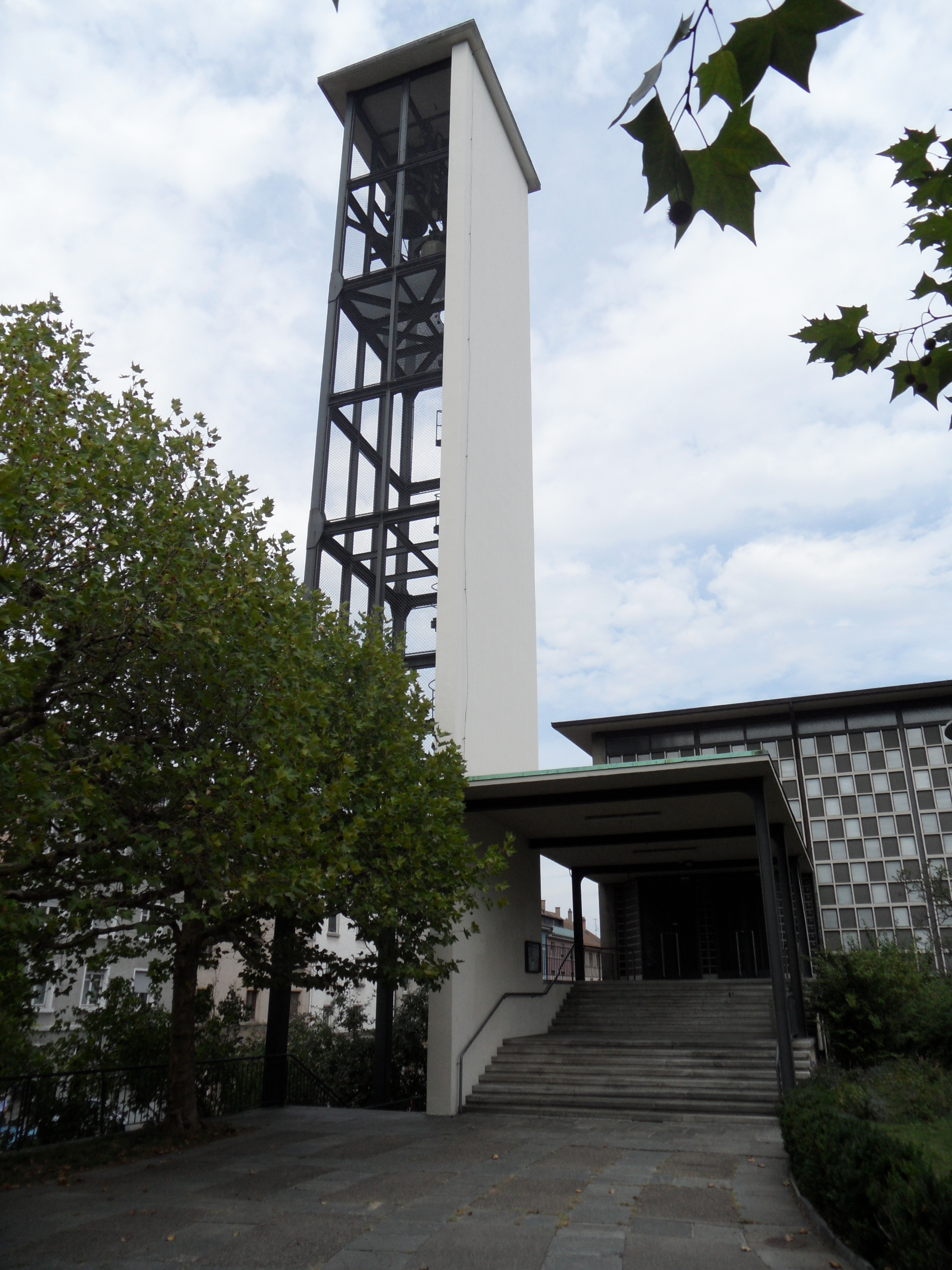
Entrance and tower of the Johanneskirche in Basel

Karl Egender (September 25, 1897, Burzweiler – September 18, 1969, Meilen) was a Swiss architect. Together with Adolf Steger, he led the architectural firm Steger and Egender, involved in the New Building movement in Zurich from 1922 to 1932.

== Education ==
Karl Egender grew up in Zurich. He completed an apprenticeship as a structural draughtsman with the Wassmer brothers in Zurich and then worked for a year in Biel. In 1920–1921, he attended lectures as a guest student under Paul Bonatz at the Stuttgart Technology University before becoming self-employed and forming a partnership with Adolf Steger.

== Career ==
The two architects established themselves from the mid-1920s with larger construction projects, often resulting from competitions. Their main work was Commercial School and Museum of Applied Arts in Zurich, but also the Volkshaus Limmathaus, also located in the industrial district nearby.

Egender continued to run his office for approximately four more decades, attracting many young architects who later pursued their own careers. In the 1930s, Wilhelm Müller was his partner. Collaborators included Ernst Friedrich Burckhardt and Bruno Giacometti. In the 1930s, notable works included the Hallenstadion in Oerlikon (1938–39), with its expansive steel structure creating the monumental effect of a sports palace, and the Johanneskirche in Basel, where the construction was also exposed. After World War II, Egender became a specialist in department store architecture.

Egender, who also emerged as a painter in his early years, was married to the painter Trudy Egender-Wintsch.

== Selected works ==
=== Buildings until 1932 by the Steger and Egender office ===
- 1927: Special Exhibition for the Swiss Hospitality Industry, Zurich
- 1928–1931: Buildings in the Zurich Zoological Garden (demolished)
- 1929: Müller/Bänninger Duplex House, Wunderlistrasse, Zurich
- 1929–1930: Eglisee Housing Block, WOBA, Basel
- 1930: Beach Bath, Küsnacht
- 1930: Sponagel Bathhouse, Feldmeilen
- 1930–1931: Limmathaus, Zurich
- 1930–1933: Commercial School and Museum of Applied Arts, Zurich

=== After 1932 ===
- 1934–1935: Albisriederhaus; Zurich Albisrieden with Wilhelm Müller
- 1934–1936: Johanneskirche; Basel with Ernst Friedrich Burckhardt
- 1935: Sculptor's Studio Bänninger; Zurich Hirslanden
- 1935: Allenmoos Open-Air Pool, Competition Project; Zurich Unterstrass with Wilhelm Müller (Extension 1999: Ueli Zbinden with Günther Vogt)
- 1936: Congress Hall, Competition Project; Zurich with Wilhelm Müller
- 1938–1939: Hallenstadion; Zurich Oerlikon with Burckhardt and Giacometti (Renovation 2005: Pfister Schiess Tropeano)
- 1939: Terrace Restaurant and Fashion Department, 1939 National Exhibition; Zurich (with Bruno Gicometti)
- 1939–1941: Baur's Building; Colombo
- 1944–1946: Sonnengarten Settlement; Zurich Albisrieden with Wilhelm Müller
- 1947–1948: Sihlgarten Business Building; Zurich
- 1951–1959: Breuninger Department Store; Stuttgart
- 1953–1956: Im Gut Housing Colony; Zurich Wiedikon and Albisrieden
- 1955: Modissa Business Building; Limmatquai, Zurich with Wilhelm Müller
- 1955: Engelhorn & Sturm Department Store; Mannheim
- 1959–1960: Luggweg Settlement; Zurich Altstetten with Wilhelm Müller
- 1960–1961: Globusprovisorium – Department Store Pavilion; Zurich
- 1962–1965: Stadthof 11 Hall Building; Zurich Oerlikon – Partial Demolition, Renovation 2004–2006 (EM2N)
- 1967: Globus Department Store; Zurich
- 1968–1969: Gebrüder Leffers Department Store; Faulenstraße 54–62, Bremen – Demolished around 2005
