= Trudy Egender-Wintsch =

Swiss artist (1902–1985)

- Born: Gertrud Ida Wintsch; 10 July 1902; Zurich, Switzerland
- Died: 24 March 1985 (aged 82); Meilen, Zurich
- Known for: Illustrations, drawings, lithographs, murals, mosaics
- Spouse: Karl Egender

Trudy Egender-Wintsch (1902– 1985), was a Swiss visual artist. Her diverse portfolio includes panel and mural paintings, illustrations, drawings, lithographs and etchings, stained glass windows, and mosaics. She was president of the Swiss Society of Women Artists in the Visual Arts (SGBK) from 1959 to 1962.

== Early life and education ==
She was born as Gertrud Ida Wintsch in Zurich, Switzerland on 10 July 1902. She was a student of the artist Willy Fries having been encouraged in her decision to pursue an artistic career by the artist Jean Arp and his wife Sophie Taeuber-Arp. As part of her studies she travelled to important art centres, particularly Florence. In 1930, she married the architect, Karl Egender, who died in 1969.

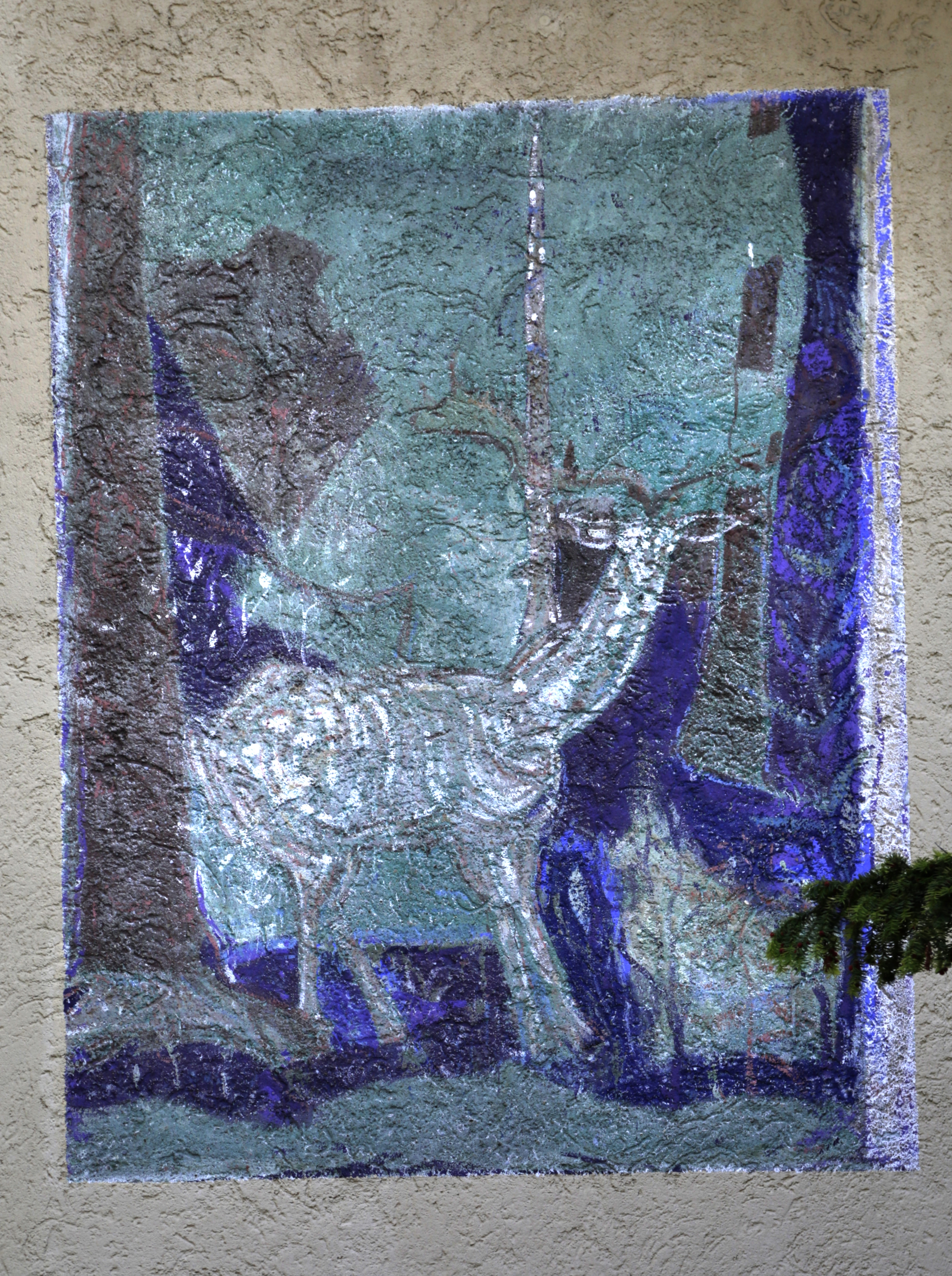
Mural attributed to Egender-Wintsch in Zurich Leimbach

== Career ==
Having exhibited in private galleries and in group exhibitions, in 1936 Egender-Wintsch showed at the 14th Swiss National Art Exhibition in the Museum of Fine Arts Bern and would contribute to the national exhibition on several other occasions. In 1937, already established as an artist of note, she was among those to exhibit in Les femmes artistes d'Europe, the first international all-woman art show in France, held at the Jeu de Paume in Paris in February. In the same year she published a 32-page book A Short Trip to Alsace, with her own text and illustrations. In 1938 she exhibited several works at the Zurich exhibition of the Society of Swiss Women Painters, Sculptors and Craftswomen, later to become the Swiss Society of Women Artists in the Visual Arts (SGBK), of which she was president from 1959 to 1962. Fifty-five women were represented at the exhibition. In 1940 she exhibited at the Kunsthaus Zürich in an exhibition called Schwarz Weiss (Black White) and again exhibited in Zurich in 1945. In 1941, together with Alois Carigiet, Max Gubler, Charles Hug, Heinrich Steiner, and seven other artists, she contributed a lithograph to a book in honour of the Schauspielhaus Zürich (Zurich Playhouse).

In 1952, Egender-Wintsch took part in an exhibition called On the artistic work of women in Zurich, organised by SGBK. In 1953, she co-founded the artists' group Graphica, consisting of seven women, and exhibited her work with other members in Vienna and Graz in Austria, and Kaiserslautern in West Germany. In 1954 she illustrated Hymn to Zurich – The Book of the City, by Edwin Arnet and in 1964 she illustrated the Great Swiss Theatre Book. She was also responsible for illustrating some of the books by Gottfried Keller. In 1956 she contributed to the Swiss National Art Exhibition, held at the Mustermesse Basel. Also known for her murals, in 1958 she created the mural Cityscape for the SGBK exhibition. She was also commissioned to do murals for schools and kindergartens, and for a restaurant. Between 1965 and 1967 she contributed to exhibitions called Artists from Zurich, shown in Zurich and Aarau.

Six works by Egender-Wintsch are held by the Swiss state. Her paintings, drawings and lithographs are held by several museums and many of her works are in private collections.

== Death ==
Egender-Wintsch died on 24 March 1985 in Meilen, a suburb of Zurich.
