= Giacomo (disambiguation) =

Giacomo is an Italian given name.

Giacomo may also refer to:

- Giacomo (horse), a race horse which won the 2005 Kentucky Derby
- Giácomo (film), a 1939 Argentine film written by Armando Discépolo
- United Office Building, also known as Giacomo, a skyscraper in Niagara Falls, New York
- Giacomo Marchi, pen name of Italian novelist, poet, essayist, editor, and intellectual Giorgio Bassani (1916–2000)
- Vanessa Giácomo, stage name of Brazilian actress and screenwriter Vanessa Mendes da Silva Lima (born 1983)

== See also ==
- Di Giacomo, a list of people with the surname
- San Giacomo (disambiguation)
