= List of museums in the Grisons =

This is a list of museums in the Grisons, Switzerland.

Name	Image	Location	City	Canton	Area of study	Summary
Museo d'arte Casa Console			Poschiavo	Grisons	Art	
Museo Poschiavino Palazzo de Bassus-Mengotti			Poschiavo	Grisons	Ethnography	
Palazzo Castelmur			Stampa	Grisons	History	
Museo Ciäsa Granda			Stampa	Grisons	Ethnography	
Museo della Polizia dei Grigioni			Chur	Grisons	Police memorabilia	
Museo di scienze naturali dei Grigioni			Chur	Grisons	Natural Sciences	
Museo d'arte dei Grigioni - Villa Planta			Chur	Grisons	Art	
Fondazione Ernesto Conrad			Poschiavo	Grisons	Art	Ernesto Conrad created Stiftung Fondazione Ernesto Conrad to exhibit his privately acquired nineteenth-century art collection to the public in appreciation of his new home town of Poschiavo.
Museo Casa Besta			Brusio	Grisons	Ethnography, tobacco growing, viticulture, antique musical instruments, and local handicrafts	
Museo Moesano			San Vittore	Grisons	Ethnography, history	

== See also ==
- List of museums in Switzerland
