= Borgonovo, Torricella Sicura =

Coordinates: 42°38′43″N 13°36′31″E

Borgonovo
- Frazione
- Interactive map of Borgonovo
- Country: Italy
- Region: Abruzzo
- Province: Teramo
- Commune: Torricella Sicura
- Time zone: UTC+1 (CET)
  - Summer (DST): UTC+2 (CEST)

Borgonovo is a frazione in the Province of Teramo in the Abruzzo region of Italy.
