= Gianantonio Borgonovo =

Italian Roman Catholic Priest and Biblical Scholar (born 1955)

The Very Reverend Monsignor Gianantonio Borgonovo
- Archpriest of Milan Cathedral
- Church: Roman Catholic Church
- Archdiocese: Milan

Orders
- Ordination: 1979

Personal details
- Born: 12 January 1955 (age 71) Merone, Italy

Gianantonio Borgonovo (born 12 January 1955) is an Italian Roman Catholic Priest, Biblical Scholar and Theologian, he is also the current Archpriest of the Milan Cathedral since 1 December 2012.

== Biography ==
Borgonovo was born in Merone on 12 January 1955. He was ordained a priest in 1975 for the Archdiocese of Milan.

He obtained a bachelor's degree at the Theological Faculty of Northern Italy, and he also specialized at the Pontifical Biblical Institute in Rome and the Hebrew University of Jerusalem in Israel. He obtained his Doctorate in Theology in 1995.

From 1985 to 1991 he taught at the Higher Institute of Religious Sciences in Milan.

In 1989 he was among the 63 theologians who signed the "Letter to Christians". The letter, interpreted by many as in open contrast with the Magisterium of the Church, sparked a broad theological and pastoral debate at the time.

Since 1999 he has been Professor of Hebrew Language at the Catholic University of the Sacred Heart in Milan.

In 1990 he founded the Italian edition of the magazine "Il Mondo della Bibbia" which he directed until 1995.

On 1 December 2012, the Archbishop of Milan, Cardinal Angelo Scola appointed Borgonovo as the Archpriest of the Milan Cathedral, and on the following 9 December, during the Eucharistic celebration of the Fourth Sunday of Advent (in Ambrosian Rite liturgical calendar), he began his new ministry.

On 10 December 2014 he was elected president of the Veneranda Fabbrica del Duomo di Milano, a position he left on 18 July 2017 with the election of Fedele Confalonieri at the top of the same body.

On 19 May 2020, Borgonovo presided over the Holy Mass with public faithful in the Milan Cathedral after the lockdown due to the COVID-19 pandemic.
