= San Giacomo =

San Giacomo may refer to the following:

== Actors ==
- Laura San Giacomo (born November 14, 1962), American actress

== Churches ==
- San Giacomo dell'Orio, Venice
- San Giacomo di Rialto, Venice
- San Giacomo degli Spagnuoli, Rome

== Places in Italy ==
- San Giacomo degli Schiavoni, a province of Campobasso
- San Giacomo delle Segnate, a province of Mantua
- San Giacomo in Paludo, an island north of the Venice Lagoon
- San Giacomo, Valle Castellana, a locality within the commune of Valle Castellana, province of Teramo
- San Giacomo, a locality within the communes of Laives and Bolzano, the site of the Bolzano Airport
- San Giacomo Pass, connecting Italy and Switzerland
- Val Spluga, also known as Val San Giacomo, an Alpine valley in the province of Sondrio in Lombardy

== See also ==
- San Giacomo Filippo, province of Sondrio
- San Giacomo Vercellese, a province of Vercelli
