= Giovanni Giacometti =

Swiss painter (1868–1933)

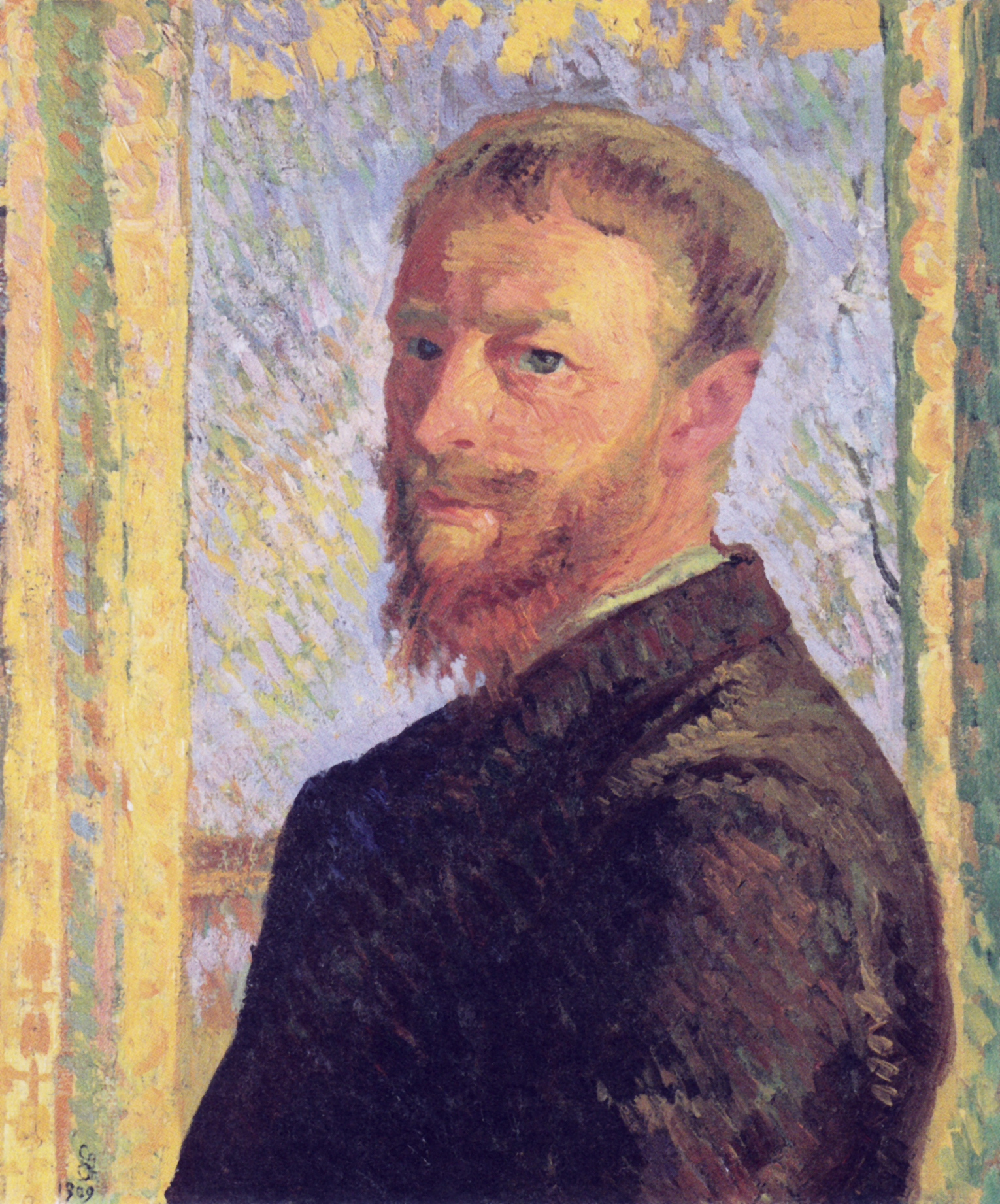
- Self-portrait (1909/10)
- Born: 7 March 1868; Stampa, Switzerland
- Died: 25 June 1933 (aged 65); Glion, Switzerland
- Known for: Painting, drawing
- Movement: Impressionism

Giovanni Ulrico Giacometti (7 March 1868 – 25 June 1933) was a Swiss painter. He was the father of artists Alberto and Diego Giacometti and architect Bruno Giacometti.

== Biography ==
He was the fourth in a family of eight children. His father, Alberto, was a baker who also ran a café. The painter Augusto Giacometti was his cousin. He received his primary education in Chur. It was there he developed an interest in art from observing the sculptures at the Bianchi marble works.

From 1886 to 1887, he studied at the Kunstgewerbeschule in Munich. He had wanted to attend the Academy of Fine Arts, but was insufficiently prepared. He also took lessons at two private schools and copied Old Masters at the Alte Pinakothek. Ultimately, he decided that Munich was not right for him, so he and his friend, Cuno Amiet, went to Paris, where they studied with William Adolphe Bouguereau and Joseph Nicolas Robert-Fleury at the Académie Julian until 1891, when financial difficulties forced him to return home.

In a short time, he began to feel isolated there and, in the summer of 1893, went to Rome, but found little inspiration. After a brief stay in Torre del Greco, broken and ill, he once again returned to Switzerland. The following year, he met and befriended the painter Giovanni Segantini, who, despite being only ten years older, became an invaluable mentor; introducing him to the beauty of mountainous landscapes and the Divisionist style. In 1898, he achieved his first major success at the Kunsthaus Zürich in a joint exhibition with his friend, Amiet, and Ferdinand Hodler.

In 1899, Segantini died suddenly, of peritonitis, aged only forty-one. Giacometti was deeply saddened but, in 1900, met and married Annetta Stampa (1871–1964), the daughter of a country school teacher. They had four children; their three famous sons and a daughter, Ottilia (1904–1937), who died in childbirth. In 1904, they moved to her home town of Borgonovo, a mountain village in Bergell. They spent their summers in Maloja, where his friend, Segantini, had lived. He was kept busy there with numerous commissions for paintings and book illustrations.

In 1908, he received an invitation from Die Brücke, an artists' group, to exhibit in Dresden. He participated in a showing by the Berlin Secession in 1911 and had his first solo exhibition at the Kunsthaus Zürich the following year. His first retrospective came in 1920. He served two terms on the Eidgenössische Kunstkommission, from 1918 to 1921 and from 1931 to 1932. Over the course of his career, he moved from Divisionism to Post-Impressionism, then on to Expressionism; with some works in the Symbolist and Art Nouveau styles along the way.

== Selected paintings ==
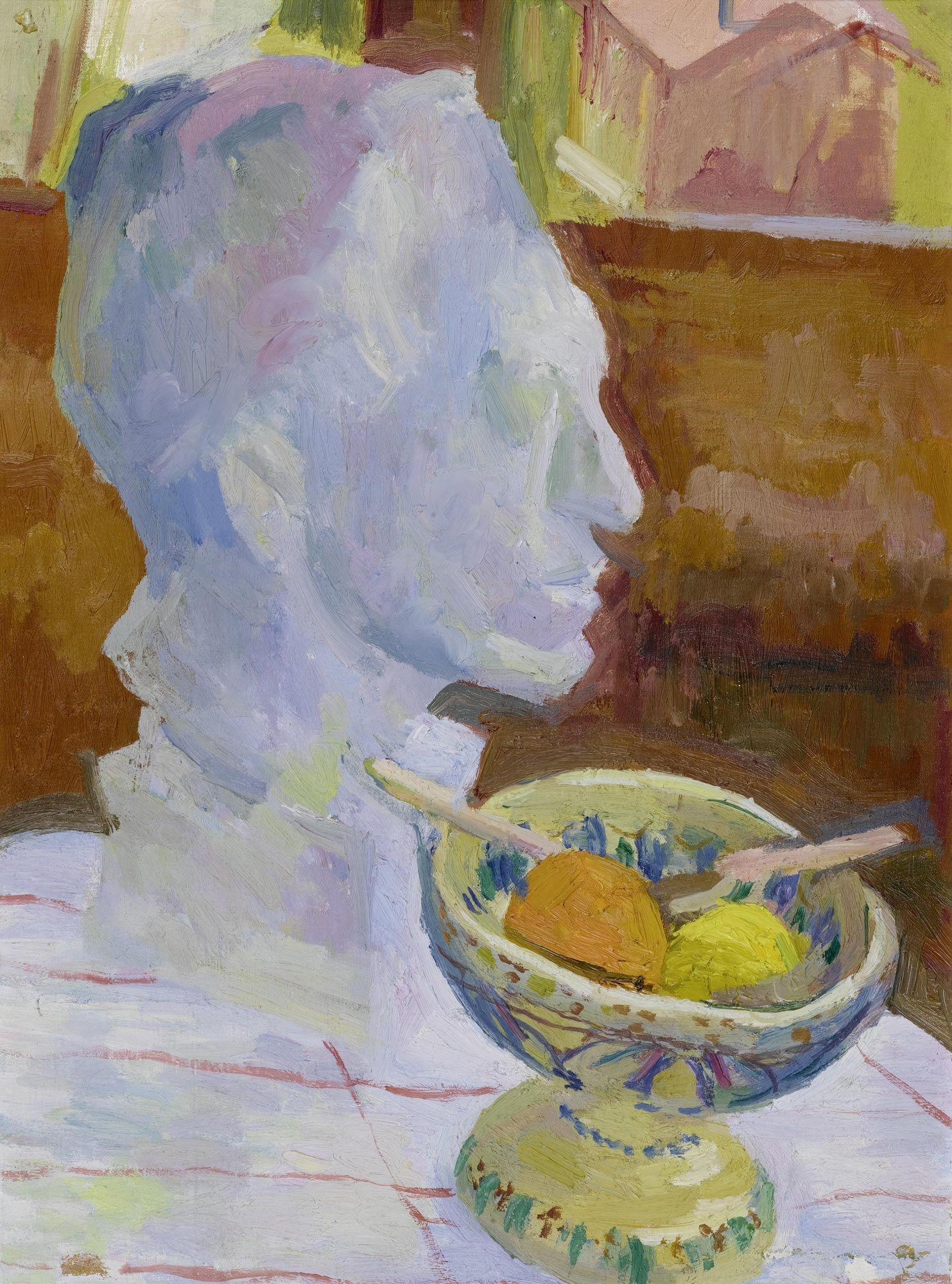
Still-life with Sculpture

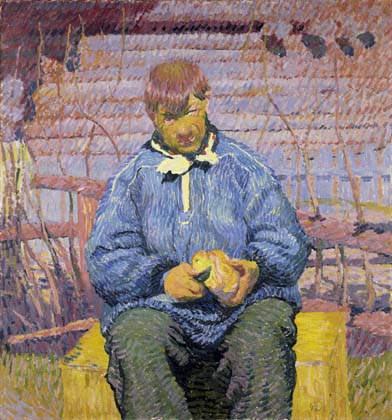
Bread

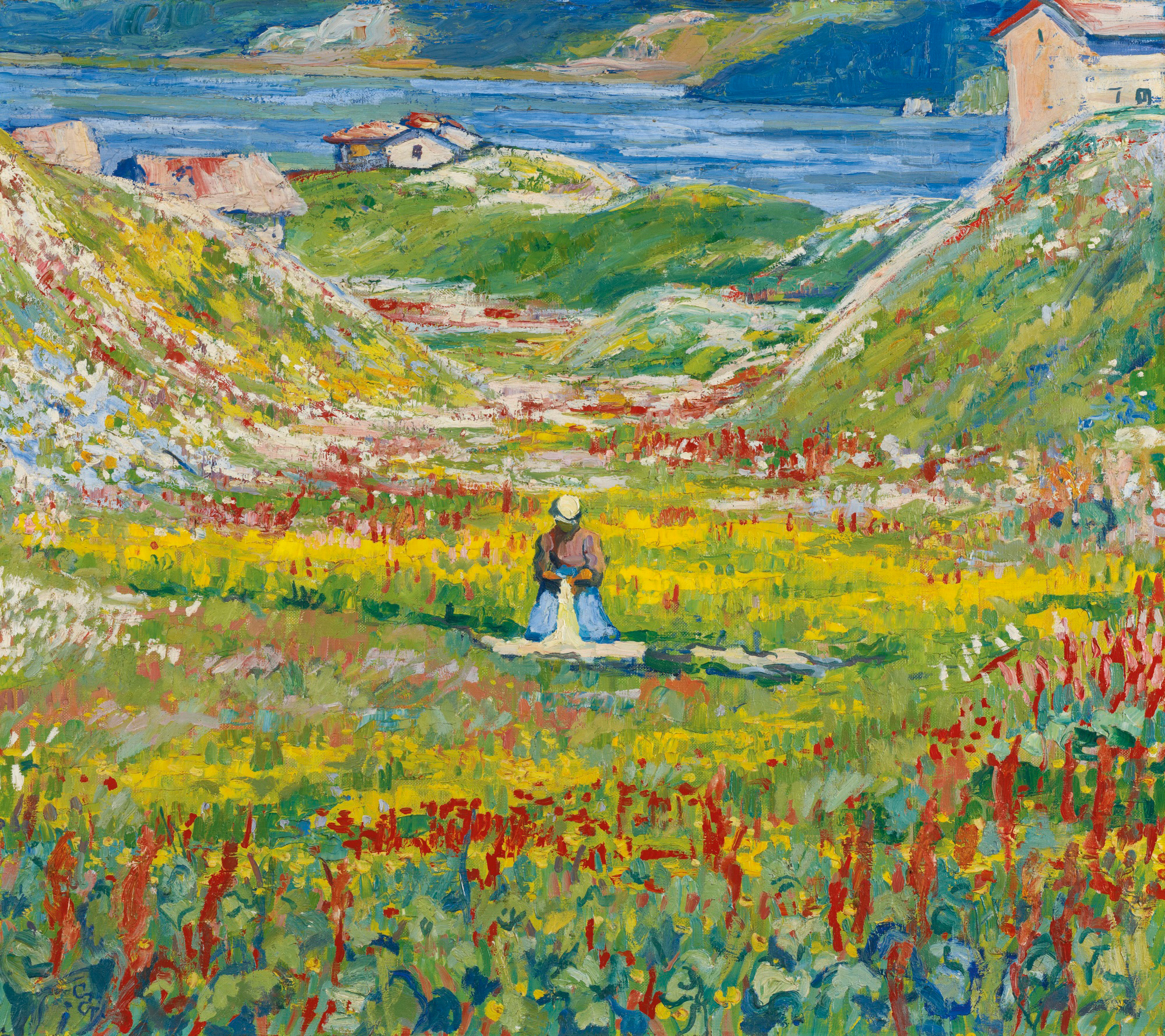
Flowery Valley

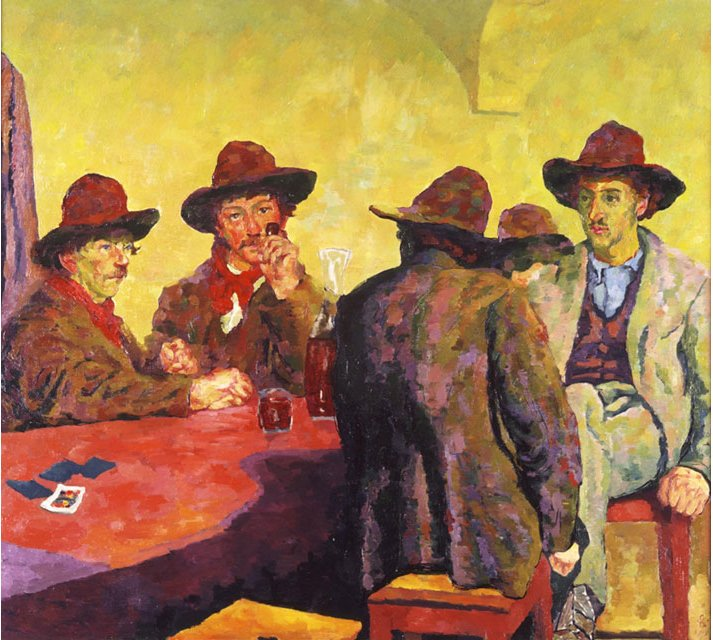
In the Tavern

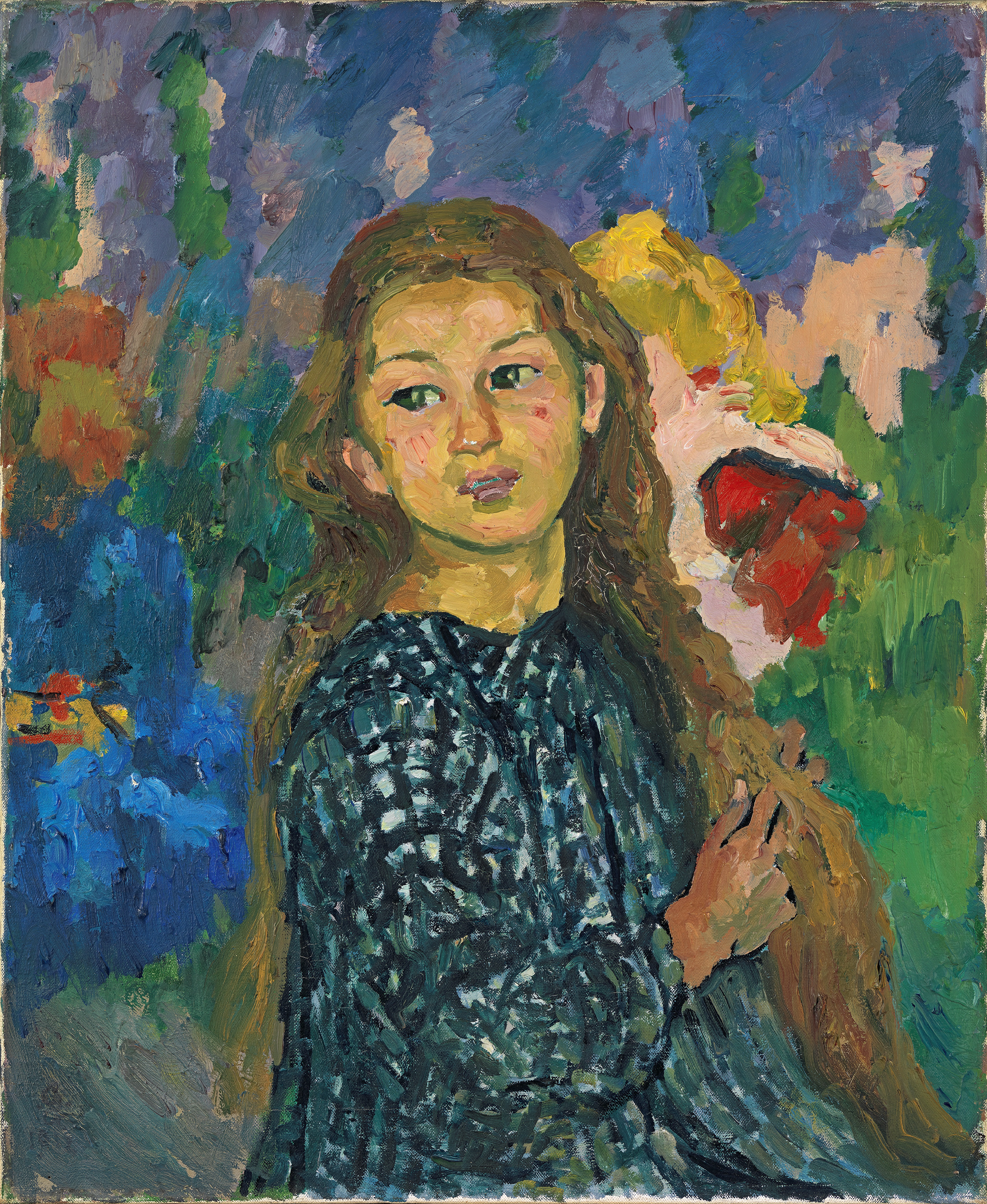
Portrait of his daughter, Ottilia
