= Bruno Giacometti =

Swiss architect (1907–2012)

- Born: 24 August 1907; Stampa, Switzerland
- Died: 21 March 2012 (aged 104); Zollikon, Switzerland
- Occupation: Architect
- Spouse: Odette Duperret
- Relatives: Giovanni Giacometti (father); Alberto Giacometti (brother); Diego Giacometti (brother)

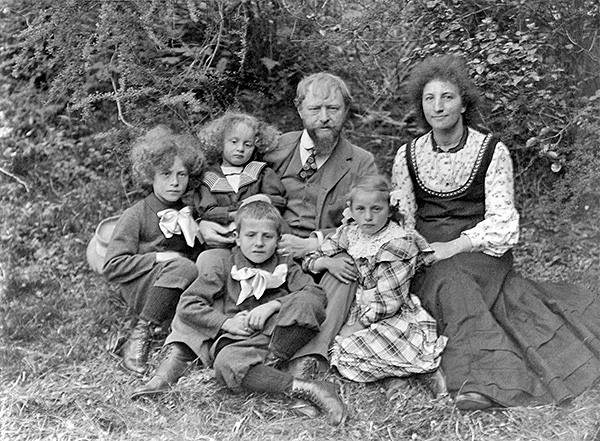
Giovanni and Annetta Giacometti with their children Alberto, Diego, Bruno and Ottilia, 1909

Bruno Giacometti (24 August 1907 – 21 March 2012) was a Swiss architect, the son of the painter Giovanni Giacometti, and the brother of the artists Alberto and Diego Giacometti. He was regarded as one of the most important post-World War II architects in Switzerland. The Swiss pavilion for the 1952 Venice Biennale was among his best-known works.

== Biography ==
Bruno Giacometti was born on 24 August 1907 in Stampa. He was the son of the painter Giovanni Giacometti and the brother of the artists Alberto and Diego Giacometti. From 1922 to 1926, he attended the cantonal school in Chur. He then studied architecture at ETH Zurich under Karl Moser and Otto Salvisberg from 1926 to 1930.

In 1935, Giacometti married Odette Duperret. In later years, the couple gave works from the Giacometti family collection to the Alberto Giacometti Foundation and several museums in Switzerland. They remained married until Odette's death in 2007. Giacometti lived in Zollikon, where he died on 21 March 2012.

== Work ==
From 1930 to 1939, Giacometti worked in the Zurich office of the architect Karl Egender. At Egender’s office, he worked on the Hallenstadion in 1938–1939 and was also involved in the 1939 Swiss National Exhibition in Zurich. He established his own office in Zurich in 1940. Shortly before opening his own office, Giacometti placed second in a 1939 competition for an extension to the cantonal school in Chur. The outbreak of the Second World War disrupted the beginning of his independent career, while his lengthy military service left him able to complete only a small number of building projects.

Giacometti designed a wide range of houses, residential developments, public buildings and exhibition structures, with much of his work located in the cantons of Zurich and Graubünden. Among his post-war commissions was the Swiss pavilion for the 1952 Venice Biennale, which was among his best-known works. Its understated exhibition spaces were designed to provide a setting for painting and sculpture. His other principal works included the hygiene and pharmacology institutes at the University of Zurich, the schools in Brusio, Uster town hall and the Natural History Museum in Chur.

Giacometti's buildings are associated with Swiss post-war modernism. In Graubünden, the placement and materials of his buildings often reflected their regional setting. He adopted a functional approach to architecture, treating buildings as a service to their users rather than as expressions of an architect’s individual style. His designs were shaped by the circumstances of each project and the practical requirements of those who would occupy the buildings. His own house in Zollikon reflected this functional approach, with a restrained modern design that placed practical requirements ahead of appearance.

== Gallery ==
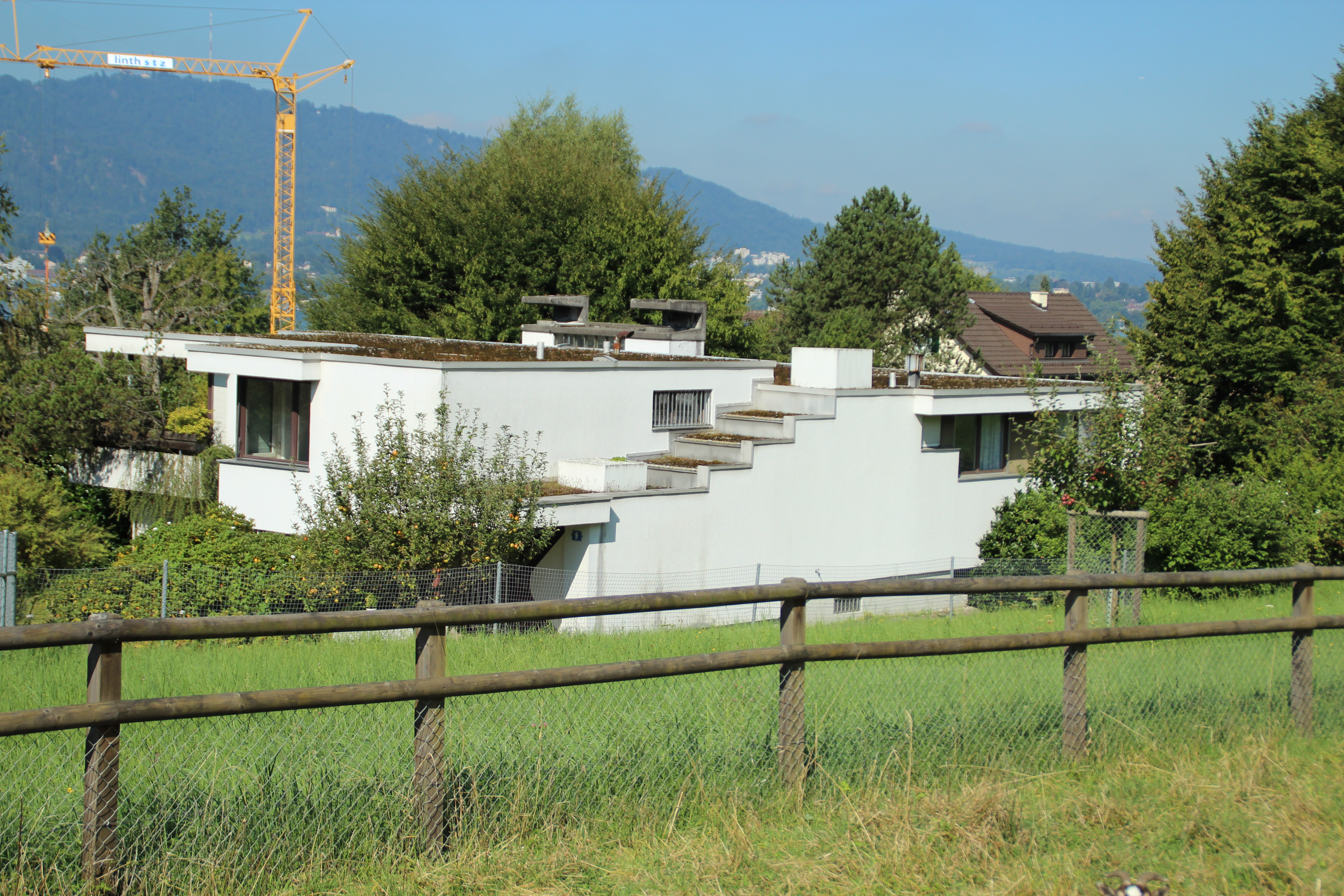
Giacometti's house in Zollikon

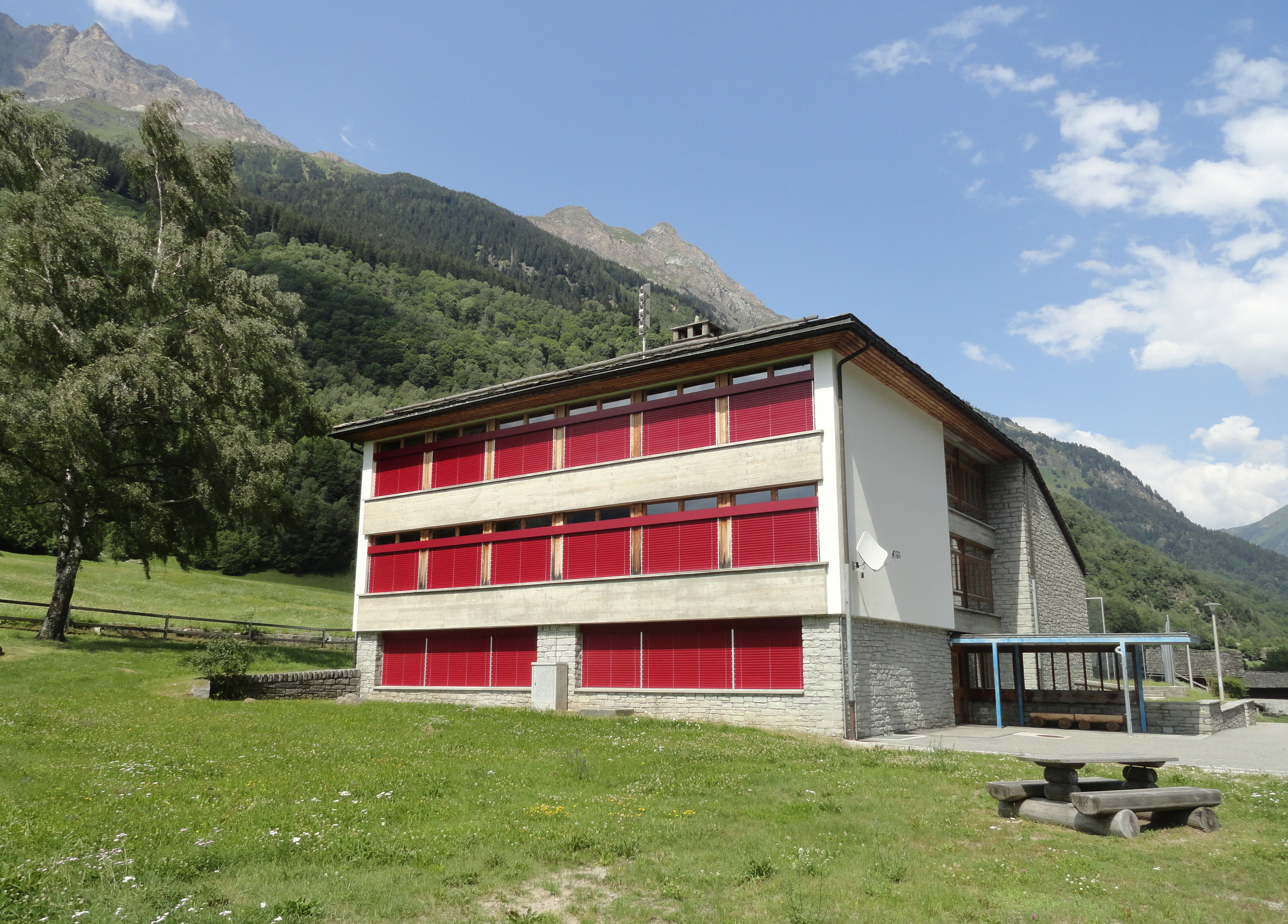
School building in Stampa

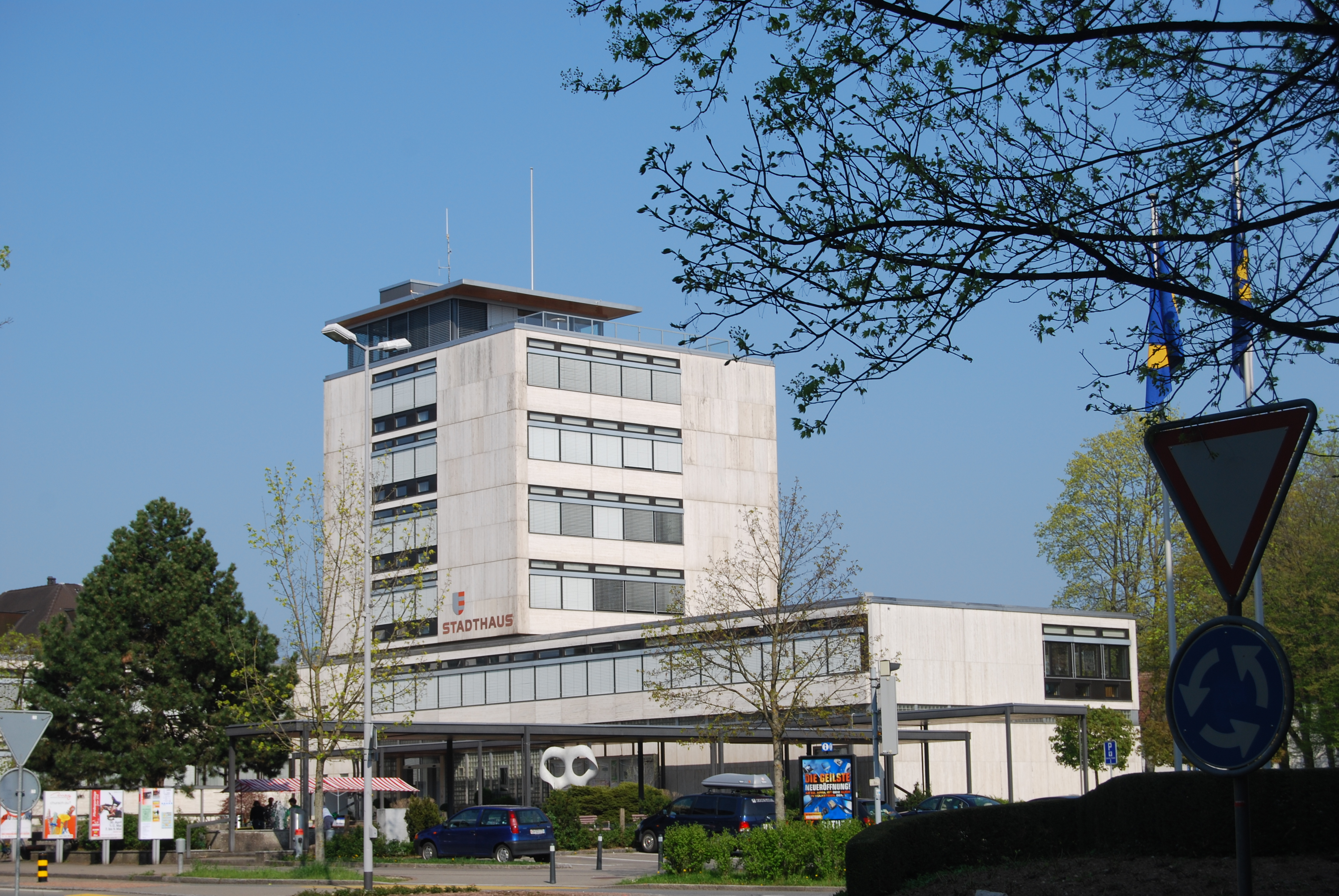
Town hall in Uster

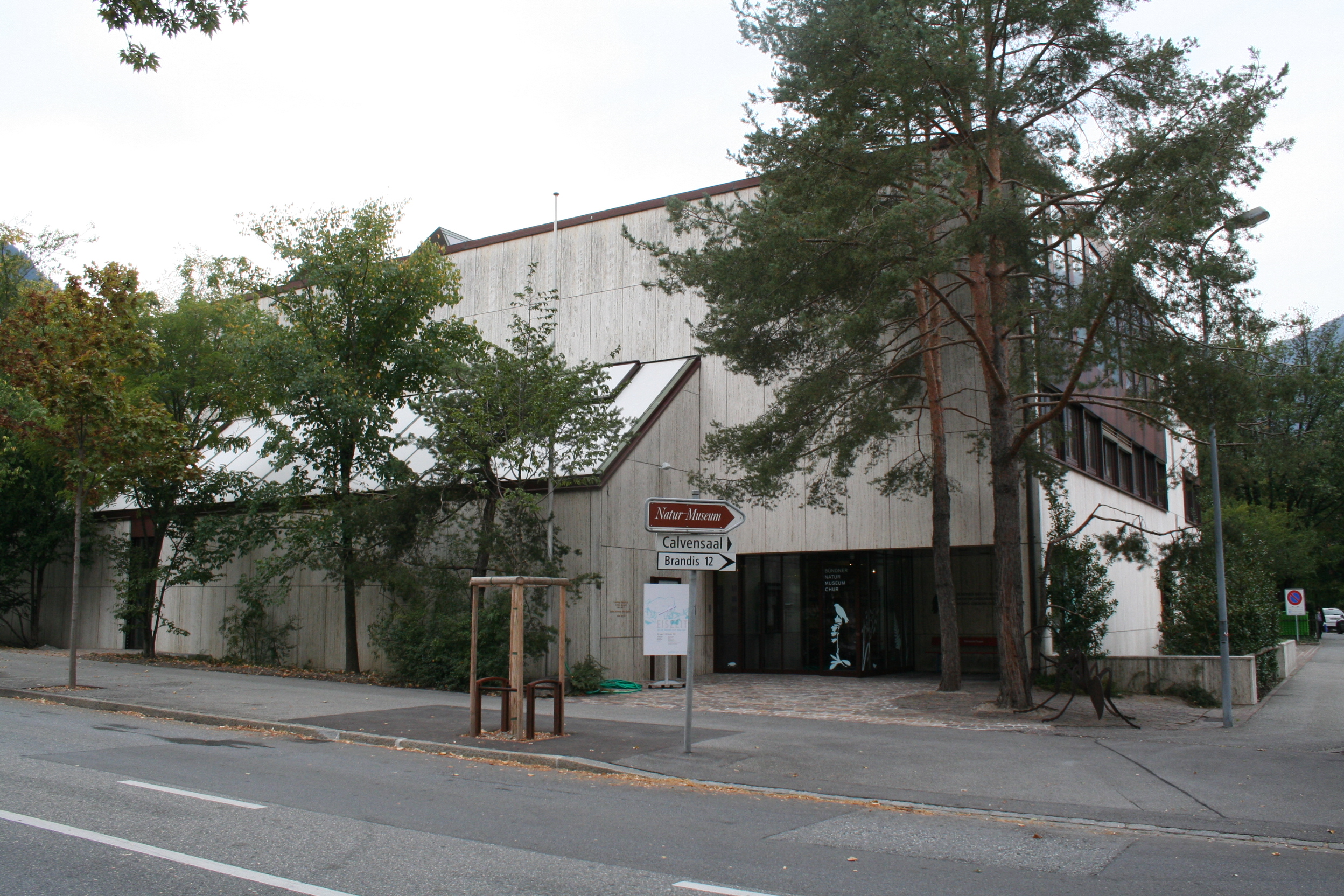
Natural History Museum in Chur
