= Diego Giacometti =

Swiss sculptor and designer

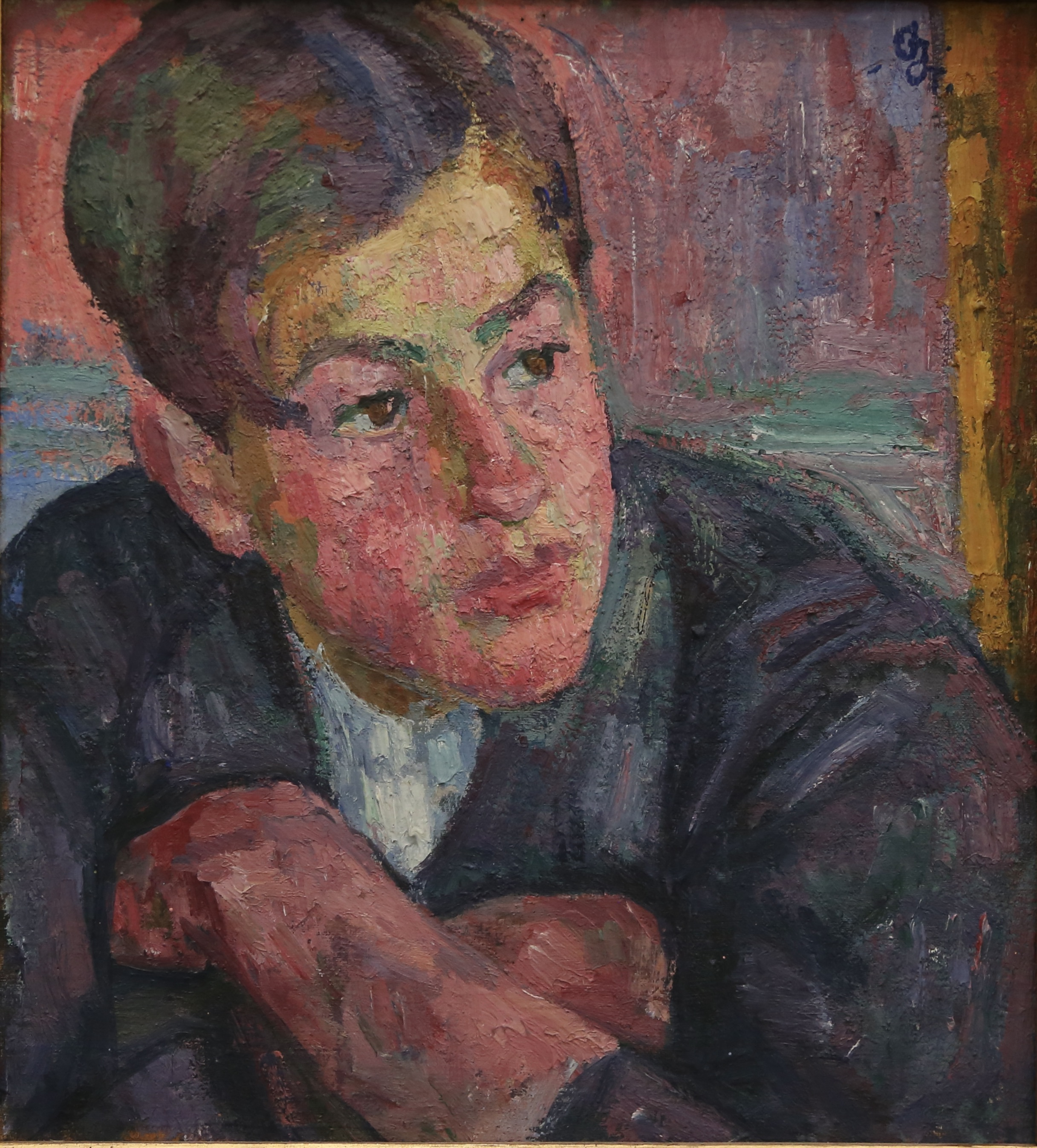
- Diego Giacometti (1919), in a portrait by Giovanni Giacometti
- Born: 15 November 1902; Borgonovo, Stampa, Switzerland
- Died: 15 July 1985 (aged 82); Paris, France
- Education: Académie de la Grande Chaumière
- Known for: Sculpture, furniture design
- Movement: Surrealism

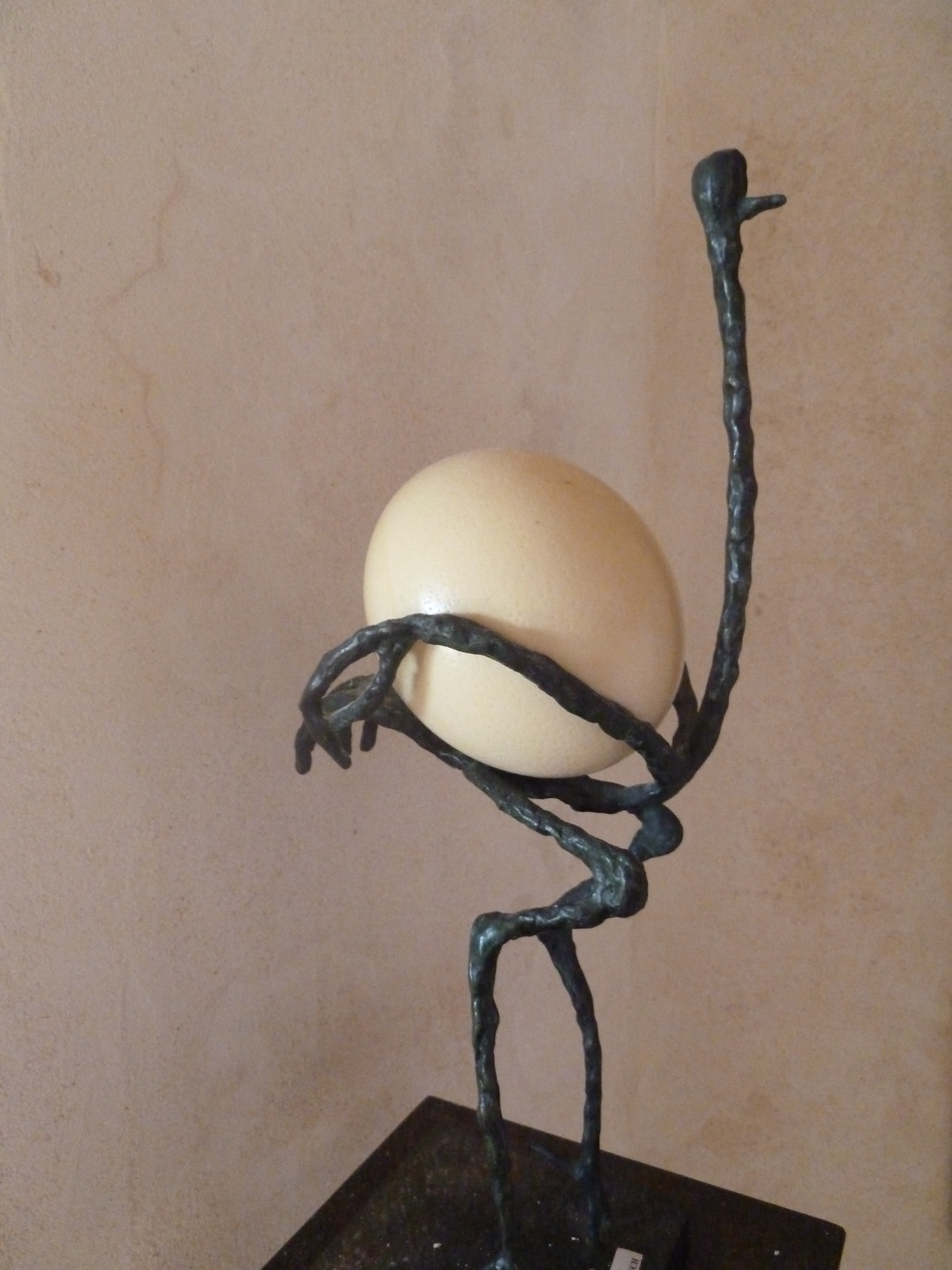
Ostrich, Bronze cast and ostrich egg, Ilana Goor museum, Jaffa.

Diego Giacometti (15 November 1902 – 15 July 1985) was a Swiss sculptor and designer, and the brother of the artists Alberto Giacometti and Bruno Giacometti.

== Youth ==
Diego Giacometti was born in Borgonovo, a Swiss village near the Italian border. Son of Annetta Stampa and the painter Giovanni Giacometti, he grew up in a warm, convivial familial atmosphere amidst the animals of their farm. In 1904, the family settled in nearby Stampa in the canton of Grisons.

After business studies in Basel and St. Gallen, at age 25, he followed the advice of his mother Annetta and went to Paris to rejoin his brother Alberto, then a student of the sculptor Antoine Bourdelle at the Academy of the Grande Chaumière. All three of the Giacometti brothers went into the visual arts: Alberto and Diego into painting and sculpture, and Bruno into architecture.

== Alberto and Diego ==
The working relationship of Diego with Alberto was so close that it is sometimes difficult to distinguish the work of Diego from that of Alberto, 13 months his senior. They shared the same sculpture studio at 46 rue Hippolyte-Maindron in Paris until the end of their lives and executed the commissions of their cultured clients, such as the Maeght and Noailles families.

During World War II, Diego Giacometti did his first animal sculptures. Animals regularly adorned his works, such as the Table arbre à la souris (Tree table with mouse), which belonged to the collection of Jean-Paul Binet, an eminent surgeon who was a close friend and patron of Diego Giacometti. His fascination with the animal kingdom was tied to the mythological and dream-like world of his childhood.

== Work of Diego Giacometti ==
His sculptures are sometimes amusing or picturesque. For example, L'Autruche (The Ostrich) owed its existence to the fact that his friend Dr. Binet, not knowing what to do with an ostrich egg, gave it to Diego, who integrated inside an ostrich that he had dreamed and sculpted. Diego Giacometti's animal art was rich. Along with familiar animals, he liked to have animals that symbolized force, power and beauty, such as the heads of lions, wolves and horses.

He used bronze, a material that permitted him to sculpt in great detail, grace and elasticity. Diego's animals called for special, often costly techniques such as the lost wax method. His animals were so finely done that they helped make his reputation.

After the death of Alberto in 1966, Diego redoubled his efforts, doing works of importance for decorators such as Georges Geffroy and Henri Samuel, or ensembles for public works such as the Fondation Maeght in Saint-Paul-de-Vence, the Chagall Museum in Nice, and the Picasso Museum in Paris. It was only after Alberto died that Diego came to be widely recognized as an important artist.

He died at the American Hospital of Paris on 15 July 1985, aged 83 years old.

A major selection of his working material—over 500 items from the studio—was given in 1986 by his estate to the Musée des Arts Décoratifs, Paris, following his exhibition held a few months after his death.

Giacometti was close friends and a mentor for celebrated designer Ingrid Donat.

== Bibliography ==
- Daniel Marchesseau, Diego Giacometti, Hermann, Paris, 1986 - new publication: 2007 (English translation: Abrams, New York, 1986)
- Claude Delay, Giacometti, Alberto et Diego, l'histoire cachée, Fayard, 2007
