= Maloja =

Maloja (Italian: Maloggia) may refer to:

- Maloja District, an administrative district in the Swiss canton of Graubünden
- Maloja Palace, a hotel in the Swiss canton of Graubünden
- Maloja Pass, an Alpine pass in the Swiss canton of Graubünden
- Maloja Region, one of eleven administrative districts in the canton of Graubünden in Switzerland
- Maloja, a village near the summit of the Maloja Pass which is part of the Swiss municipality of Bregaglia in the Maloja District
- RMS Maloja, a P&O passenger liner built in 1923 and scrapped in 1954
- SS Maloja, a P&O passenger liner built in 1911 and mined in 1916
- Maloja Wind, mountain wind in Switzerland
