= SS Maloja =

SS Maloja is the name of the following ships:

- SS Maloja (1906), sunk 1943
- SS Maloja (1910), sunk by mine, 1916

== See also ==
- Maloja (disambiguation)
- RMS Maloja
