= SS Dieppe =

Dieppe was the name of three steamships operated by the London, Brighton and South Coast Railway:

- SS Dieppe (1847)
- SS Dieppe (1855)
- SS Dieppe (1905), sunk in 1941
