= Lägh da Bitabergh =

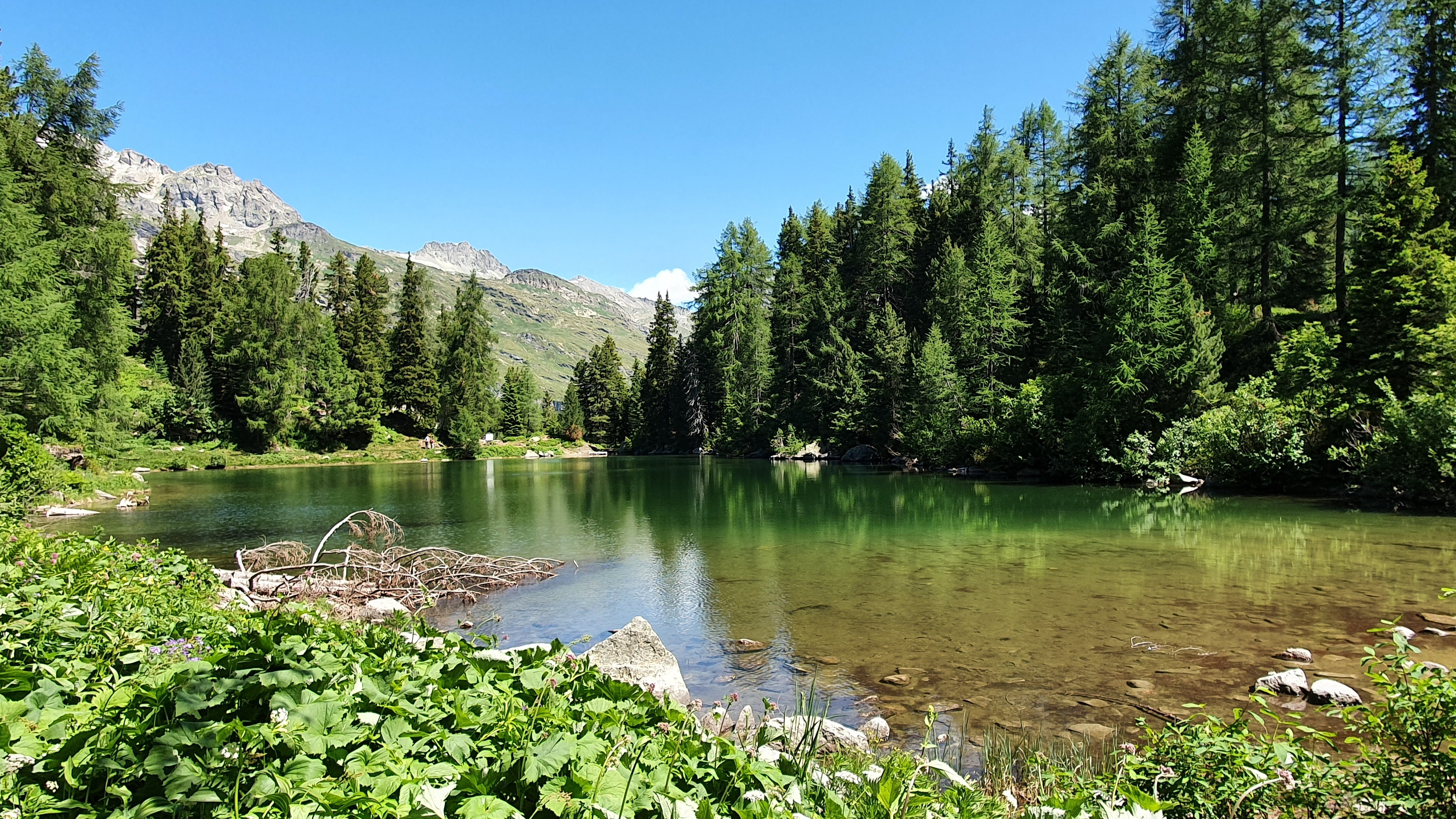

- Location within Canton of Graubünden Location within Switzerland Location within Italy Location within Alps
- Interactive map of Lägh da Bitabergh
- Location: Val Bregaglia, Grisons
- Coordinates: 46.3903°N 9.6858°E
- Type: Natural freshwater lake
- Basin countries: Switzerland
- Max. length: 125 m (410 ft)
- Max. width: 85 m (279 ft)
- Surface elevation: 1,855 m (6,086 ft)

Lägh da Bitabergh is a lake near Maloja Pass in Val Bregaglia, Grisons, Switzerland.

== Access ==
The lake can be reached on a hiking trail from Maloja in about 40 minutes hiking time. From Lägh da Bitabergh further hiking trails lead to Lägh da Cavloc (45 minutes) or steeply up to Motta Salacina and Pass dal Caval.
