= Orography =

Study of the topographic relief of mountains

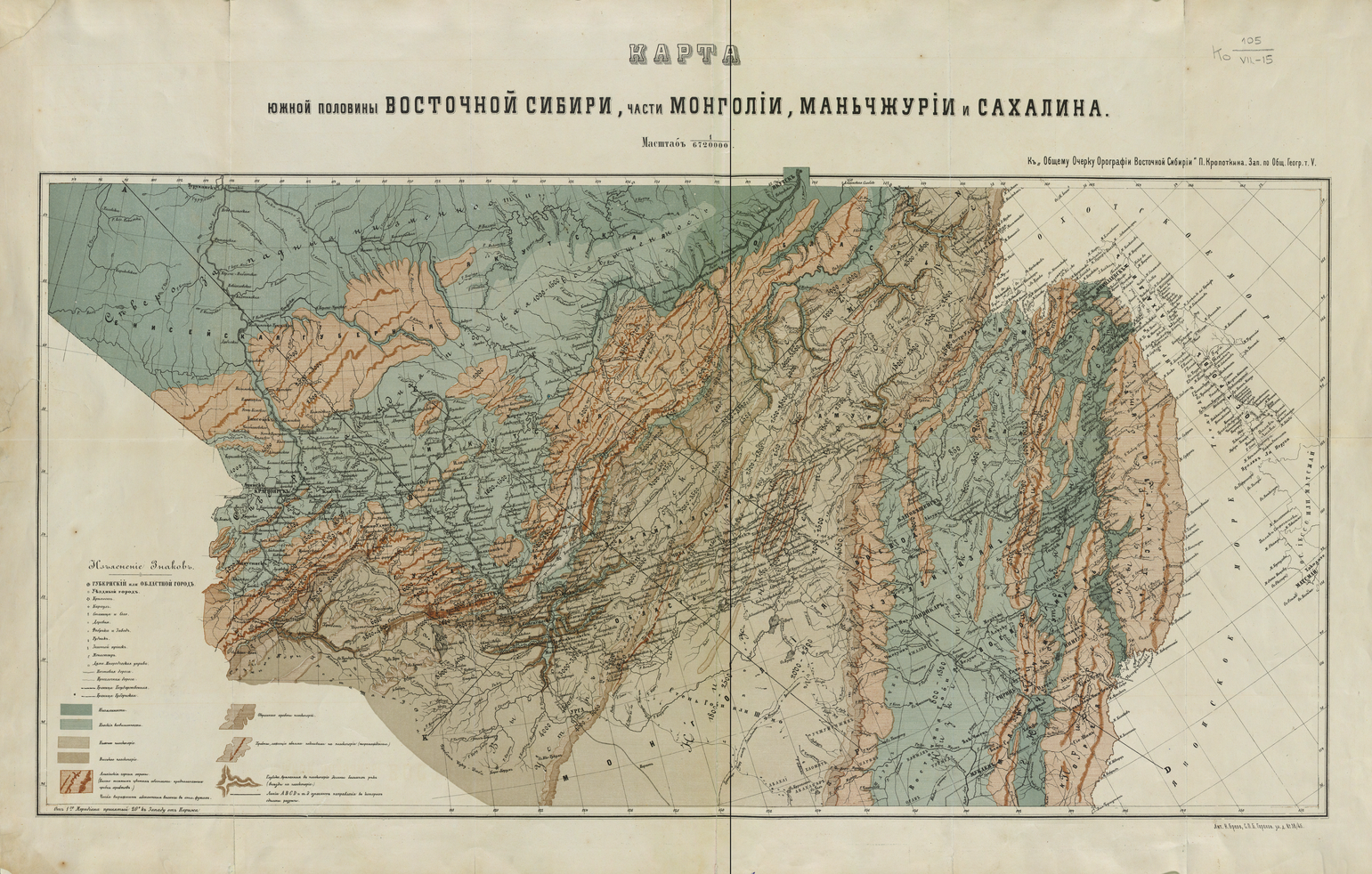
An orographic map of Eastern Siberia from 1875 by Peter Kropotkin

Orography is the study of the topographic relief of mountains, and can more broadly include hills, water stream directions and any part of a region's elevated terrain. Orography (also known as oreography, orology, or oreology) falls within the broader discipline of geomorphology. The term orography comes from the Greek: όρος, hill, γράφω, to write.

== Uses ==
Mountain ranges and elevated land masses have a major impact on global climate. For instance, the elevated areas of East Africa substantially determine the strength of the Indian monsoon. In scientific models, such as general circulation models, orography defines the lower boundary of the model over land.

When a river's tributaries or settlements by the river are listed in 'orographic sequence', they are in order from the highest (nearest the source of the river) to the lowest or mainstem (nearest the mouth). This method of listing tributaries is similar to the Strahler Stream Order, where the headwater tributaries are listed as category 1.

== Orographic precipitation ==
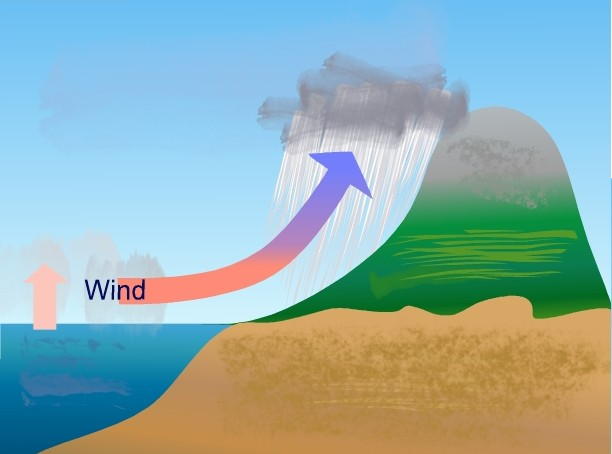
Orographic precipitation occurs when moist air is forced upwards by terrain.

Orographic precipitation, also known as relief precipitation, is precipitation generated by a forced upward movement of air upon encountering a physiographic upland (see anabatic wind). This lifting can be caused by:

1. Upward deflection of large-scale horizontal flow by the orography.
2. Anabatic or upward vertical propagation of moist air up an orographic slope, caused by daytime heating of the mountain barrier surface.

== See also ==
- Coverage (telecommunication)
- Orographic lift
- Rain shadow

== General and cited references ==
- Stull, Roland (2017). Practical Meteorology: An Algebra-based Survey of Atmospheric Science. University of British Columbia. ISBN 978-0-88865-283-6.
- Whiteman, C. David (2000). Mountain Meteorology: Fundamentals and Applications. Oxford University Press. ISBN 0-19-513271-8.
