= Clouds of Sils Maria =

2014 film

- French theatrical release poster
- Directed by: Olivier Assayas
- Written by: Olivier Assayas
- Produced by: Charles Gillibert
- Starring: Juliette Binoche; Kristen Stewart; Chloë Grace Moretz; Lars Eidinger; Johnny Flynn; Brady Corbet; Hanns Zischler; Angela Winkler; Nora von Waldstätten
- Cinematography: Yorick Le Saux
- Edited by: Marion Monnier
- Production companies: CG Cinéma; Pallas Film; CAB Productions; Vortex Sutra; Arte France Cinéma; Orange Studio; Radio Télévision Suisse; SRG SSR idée suisse
- Distributed by: Les Films du Losange (France); NFP Marketing & Distribution (Germany); Filmcoopi Zürich (Switzerland)
- Release dates: 23 May 2014 (Cannes); 20 August 2014 (France); 18 December 2014 (Germany)
- Running time: 123 minutes
- Countries: France; Germany; Switzerland
- Language: English
- Budget: €5.1 million
- Box office: $4.7 million

Clouds of Sils Maria (known simply as Sils Maria in some territories) is a 2014 psychological drama film written-directed by Olivier Assayas, and starring Juliette Binoche, Kristen Stewart, and Chloë Grace Moretz. The film is a French-German-Swiss co-production. Principal photography took place from August to October 2013, with most of the filming taking place in Sils Maria, Switzerland.

The film follows an established, middle-aged actress (Binoche) who is cast as the older lover in a romantic lesbian drama opposite an upstart young starlet (Moretz). She is overcome with personal insecurities and professional jealousies—all while tension simmers between her and her personal assistant (Stewart). The screenplay was written with Binoche in mind and incorporates elements from her life into the plot.

Clouds of Sils Maria was selected to compete for the Palme d'Or in the main competition section at the 2014 Cannes Film Festival on 23 May 2014, and also screened at the Toronto International Film Festival and New York Film Festival. The film received positive reviews, with critics lauding the work as psychologically complex and praising the lead actresses' performances. It won the Louis Delluc Prize for Best Film in December 2014 and received six César Award nominations. Stewart received the César Award for Best Supporting Actress in February 2015, the first time an American had won the award.

== Plot ==
Maria Enders is an international film and stage actress. She travels with a loyal and young American assistant, Valentine. Twenty years earlier, Maria got her big break when she was cast and successfully performed as a young girl Sigrid in both the play and film version of Maloja Snake by Wilhelm Melchior, a Swiss playwright who is now elderly. The play centers on the tempestuous relationship between Sigrid and Helena, a vulnerable older woman as well as her employer. Helena commits suicide after Sigrid takes advantage of her and dumps her.

While traveling to Zürich to accept an award on behalf of Wilhelm, and planning to visit him at home the following day at his house in Sils Maria—a remote settlement in the Alps—Maria learns of his death. His widow, Rosa, later confides that Wilhelm had been terminally ill and had ended his life. During the awards ceremony, Maria is approached by Klaus Diesterweg, a popular theater director. He wants to persuade her to appear onstage in a revival of Maloja Snake, but this time in the role of Helena.

Maria is torn and reluctantly accepts. To prepare for the role, she accepts Rosa's offer to stay at the Melchiors' house in Sils Maria. Rosa is leaving to escape her memories of Wilhelm. Maria's discussions with Valentine and their read-throughs of the play's scenes evoke uncertainty about the nature of their relationship. A young American actress, 19-year-old Jo-Ann Ellis, has been chosen to portray the role of Sigrid. Researching her on Google and the Internet, Valentine tells Maria, who is out of touch with social media, that Ellis has been involved in numerous scandals.

Questions soon multiply regarding aging, time, culture, and the blurring line between the Sigrid/Helena and the Valentine/Maria relationships. Maria and Jo-Ann finally meet, but their relationship is complicated. Jo-Ann appears to be implicated in the attempted suicide of the wife of her new boyfriend.

During their time at Sils Maria, Maria and Valentine spend much of their days hiking in the Alps. On one such final outing, they hike to the Maloja Pass to observe the Maloja Snake (both the "Maloja Snake" of the play's title and the "Clouds of Sils Maria" in the film's title). When discussing the play’s ending, in which Helena walks into the mountains never to return, Valentine suggests that Helena can still be alive and walk away to start a new life. Maria protests that Helena must be dead because she doesn’t return. After suggesting that their approaches to the play are too different for her (Valentine) to be a useful assistant, Valentine disappears without explanation.

A few weeks later, a young filmmaker who previously sent a script to Maria visits her by appointment five minutes before the curtain rises on the opening night of Maloja Snake in London. Maria seems preoccupied, being so close to the start of the performance, and dismisses his suggested ideas about the proposed film role he is offering her as "too abstract for me". When she says the role he has written is too young for her and would suit Jo-Ann better, he suggests that the character is ageless and he does not relate to his era with its Internet scandals and trashy values. Maria does not give him a reply as to whether she will take part in the film. She next appears onstage, smoking, and waiting for Sigrid.

== Cast ==
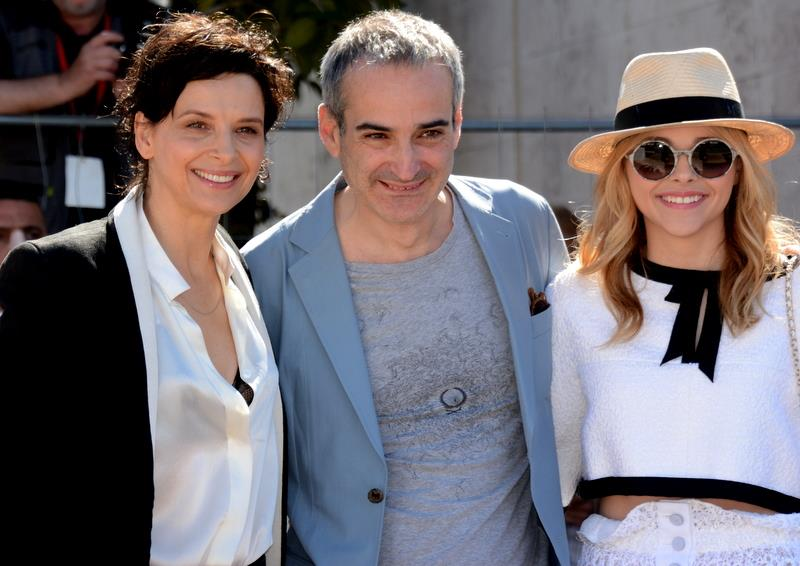
Juliette Binoche, Olivier Assayas, and Chloë Grace Moretz promoting the film at the 2014 Cannes Film Festival.

- Juliette Binoche as Maria Enders
- Kristen Stewart as Valentine
- Chloë Grace Moretz as Jo-Ann Ellis
- Johnny Flynn as Christopher Giles
- Lars Eidinger as Klaus Diesterweg
- Hanns Zischler as Henryk Wald
- Brady Corbet as Piers Roaldson
- Aljoscha Stadelmann as Urs Kobler
- Benoit Peverelli as Berndt
- Luise Berndt as Nelly
- Angela Winkler as Rosa Melchior
- Gilles Tschudi as Mayor of Zürich
- Caroline de Maigret as Chanel Press Attache
- Claire Tran as Maria's London Assistant (Mei-Ling)
- Jakob Kohn as Jo-Ann's manager

== Production ==
Principal photography of Clouds of Sils Maria began on 22 August 2013 and ended on 4 October. The film was shot on location in the titular village of Sils Maria, Switzerland as well as Zürich; Leipzig, Germany; and South Tyrol, Italy.

In an interview, Assayas said that all the film's interiors were shot in Germany. The production moved to Sils Maria to film the hiking scenes and moved again to film the scenes in and around the chalet in South Tyrol.

The Chanel company debuted in film financing with this production. In addition, it supplied the actresses with clothes, jewelry, accessories, and makeup, and the brand was scripted in as a provider of the same to Maria. Chanel provided some of the budget to allow Olivier Assayas to fulfill his dream of shooting a film on 35-mm film instead of digitally.

Assayas has described the fictional play Maloja Snake as a "condensed, brutalized version" of The Bitter Tears of Petra von Kant, a play by Rainer Werner Fassbinder (it was later adapted as a film of the same name).

The American title of the film is Clouds of Sils Maria. In France, the film was released as Sils Maria, Assayas' original name.

== Release ==
=== Marketing ===
The first trailer for the film was released on 22 May 2014. Another international trailer followed on 7 July.

=== Film festivals ===
The film was selected to compete for the Palme d'Or in the main competition section at the 2014 Cannes Film Festival on 23 May 2014. It also screened at the Toronto International Film Festival and New York Film Festival.

== Reception ==
=== Critical response ===
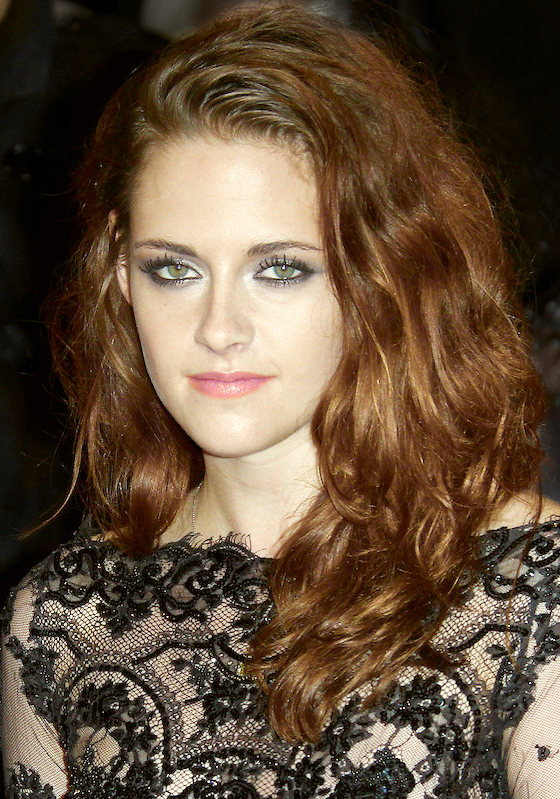
Kristen Stewart's portrayal garnered widespread critical acclaim.

On review aggregator Rotten Tomatoes, 91% of 179 critics have given the film a positive review, with an average rating of 7.6/10. The website's critics consensus reads: "Bolstered by a trio of powerful performances from its talented leads, Clouds of Sils Maria is an absorbing, richly detailed drama with impressive depth and intelligence." On Metacritic, the film has a weighted average score of 80 out of 100, based on 42 reviews from critics, indicating "generally favorable reviews".

Clouds of Sils Maria premiered at the Cannes Film Festival to positive reviews. Robbie Collin of The Daily Telegraph stated, "This is a complex, bewitching and melancholy drama, another fearlessly intelligent film from Assayas." He said, "Binoche plays the role with elegance and melancholic wit – her character slips between fiction and fact in a way that recalls her role in Abbas Kiarostami's Certified Copy. But it's Stewart who really shines here. Valentine is probably her best role to date: she's sharp and subtle, knowable and then suddenly distant, and a late, surprising twist is handled with a brilliant lightness of touch."

Peter Debruge of Variety said it was Assayas' "daring rejoinder, a multi-layered, femme-driven meta-fiction that pushes all involved—including next-gen starlets Kristen Stewart and Chloë Grace Moretz — to new heights." Matt Risley of Total Film called it "an elegant, intelligent drama, enlivened by strong performances by Binoche, Moretz and especially Stewart, for whom this will surely usher in a new dawn."

Stephanie Zacharek of The Village Voice wrote: "But the movie's true center, the meteorological phenomenon that makes it so pleasurable to watch, is the half-prickly, half-affectionate interplay between Binoche and Stewart." Ben Sachs of Chicago Reader wrote: "This recalls Ingmar Bergman's chamber dramas in the intensity and psychological complexity of the central relationship, yet the filmmaking is breathtakingly fluid, evoking a sense of romantic abandon."

Richard Brody from The New Yorker wrote: "Clouds of Sils Maria, as the title suggests, is a sort of travelogue, a commercial for European cultural tourism, and, as such, it's the perfect image of the very system that created it. There's almost no independent filmmaking in France, and there isn't supposed to be. If there were, it would stand as a threat to the system that, by way of training, enticements, and restrictions, is the source of the comforts that the movie depicts and that the movie reflects. The mediocrity is stifling."

=== Box office ===
Clouds of Sils Maria opened in France on 20 August 2014 in 150 theaters for a $3,663 per theater average and a box office total of $549,426 as of 24 August 2014. The film expanded to 195 theaters in its second week of release, and the box office increased to an estimated $1,150,090.

Clouds of Sils Maria opened in the United States on 10 April 2015 in three theaters and grossed $69,729 on its opening weekend for an average of $23,243 per. As of 4 June 2015, the film has grossed an estimated $1,743,577 after expanding theaters.

=== Awards and nominations ===
The film won the Louis Delluc Prize for Best Film in December 2014. The film received six César Award nominations including best film, best director, best actress, best original screenplay, and best cinematography, while Stewart won for best supporting actress, becoming the first American actress to win a César and the third American actor to win after Adrien Brody in 2003 and Christopher Lambert in 1985.

Year	Awards	Category	Nominee	Outcome
2014	Prix Louis Delluc	Best Film	Olivier Assayas	Won
2014	Munich Film Festival	Best International Film	Olivier Assayas	Nominated
2014	Lumière Awards	Best Actress	Juliette Binoche	Nominated
2015	Alliance of Women Film Journalists	Best Actress in a Supporting Role	Kristen Stewart	Won
2015	César Award	Best Supporting Actress	Kristen Stewart	Won
2015	César Award	Best Actress	Juliette Binoche	Nominated
2015	César Award	Best Original Screenplay	Olivier Assayas	Nominated
2015	César Award	Best Director	Olivier Assayas	Nominated
2015	César Award	Best Film	Charles Gillibert & Olivier Assayas	Nominated
2015	César Award	Best Cinematography	Yorick Le Saux	Nominated
2015	New York Film Critics Circle	Best Supporting Actress	Kristen Stewart	Won
2015	National Society of Film Critics	Best Supporting Actress	Kristen Stewart	Won
2015	Boston Society of Film Critics	Best Supporting Actress	Kristen Stewart	Won
2015	Los Angeles Film Critics Association Awards	Best Supporting Actress	Kristen Stewart	Runner-up
2015	Online Film Critics Society	Best Supporting Actress	Kristen Stewart	Nominated
2015	Detroit Film Critics Society	Best Supporting Actress	Kristen Stewart	Nominated
2015	San Diego Film Critics Society	Best Supporting Actress	Kristen Stewart	Runner-up
2015	St. Louis Gateway Film Critics Association	Best Supporting Actress	Kristen Stewart	Runner-up
2015	St. Louis Gateway Film Critics Association	Best Original Screenplay	Olivier Assayas	Nominated
2015	Austin Film Critics Association	Best Supporting Actress	Kristen Stewart	Nominated
2015	Chicago Film Critics Association	Best Supporting Actress	Kristen Stewart	Nominated
2015	Florida Film Critics Circle	Best Supporting Actress	Kristen Stewart	Won
2015	Toronto Film Critics Association	Best Supporting Actress	Kristen Stewart	Runner-up
2015	London Film Critics Circle	Supporting Actress of the Year	Kristen Stewart	Nominated

== Soundtrack ==
- "Kowalski" by Primal Scream
- "Largo de Xerxes" – Georg Friedrich Handel
- "Canon and Gigue in D Major for 3 Violins and Basso Continuo" – Johann Pachelbel
- "Paavin of Albarti (Alberti)" – Innocentio Alberti (performed by Hesperion XXI)
- "Sonata No. 2 in D Minor" – Georg Friedrich Handel
- "Sonata No. 2 in B-Flat Major for Violin and Harp, Op. 16: II. Adagio" - Louis Spohr
- "Trio for Violin, Cello and Harp in E minor: III. Rondo" - Louis Spohr

== Home media ==
The film was released on DVD and Digital HD by Paramount Home Media on July 14, 2015; the company also handles the digital entertainment sales, with IFC handling the video on demand sales.

The Criterion Collection released a DVD and Blu-ray edition on 28 June 2016.
