= Maloja Wind =

Mountain wind in Switzerland

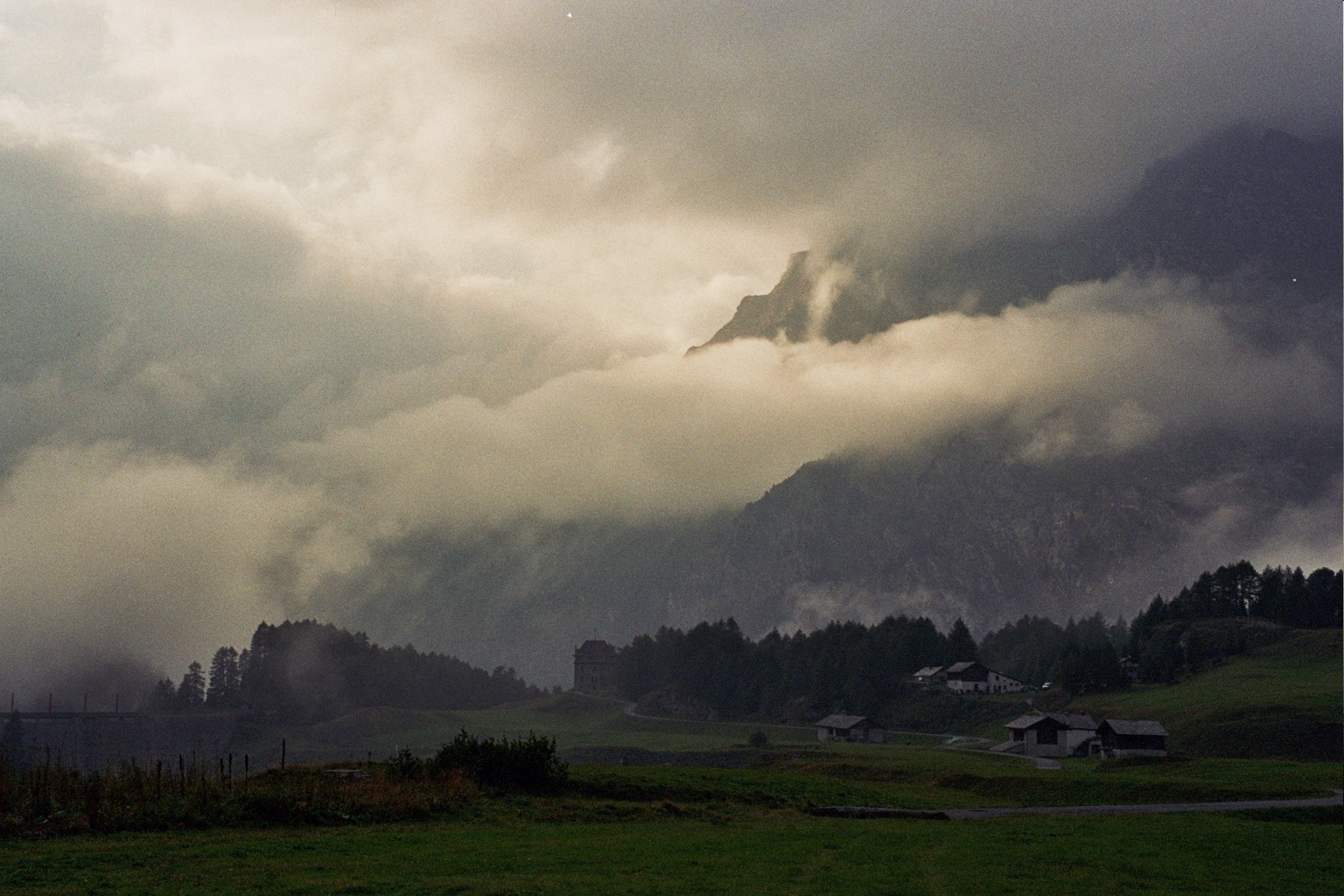
The Maloja Snake, a weather phenomenon produced by the Maloja Wind

The Maloja Wind (German: Malojawind) is a Foehn-type mountain wind that occurs in the upper Engadin, an alpine valley located in Switzerland. The wind blows up-valley during the nighttime and down-valley during the day, a deviation of the typical direction of mountain and valley winds. The phenomenon is caused by wind from the Val Bregaglia crossing the Maloja Pass and intruding into the Engadin. The Maloja Wind occasionally produces a weather phenomenon known as the Maloja Snake (German: Malojaschlange), a low-lying cloud so named for its long, serpentine shape.

== Description ==
=== Maloja Wind ===
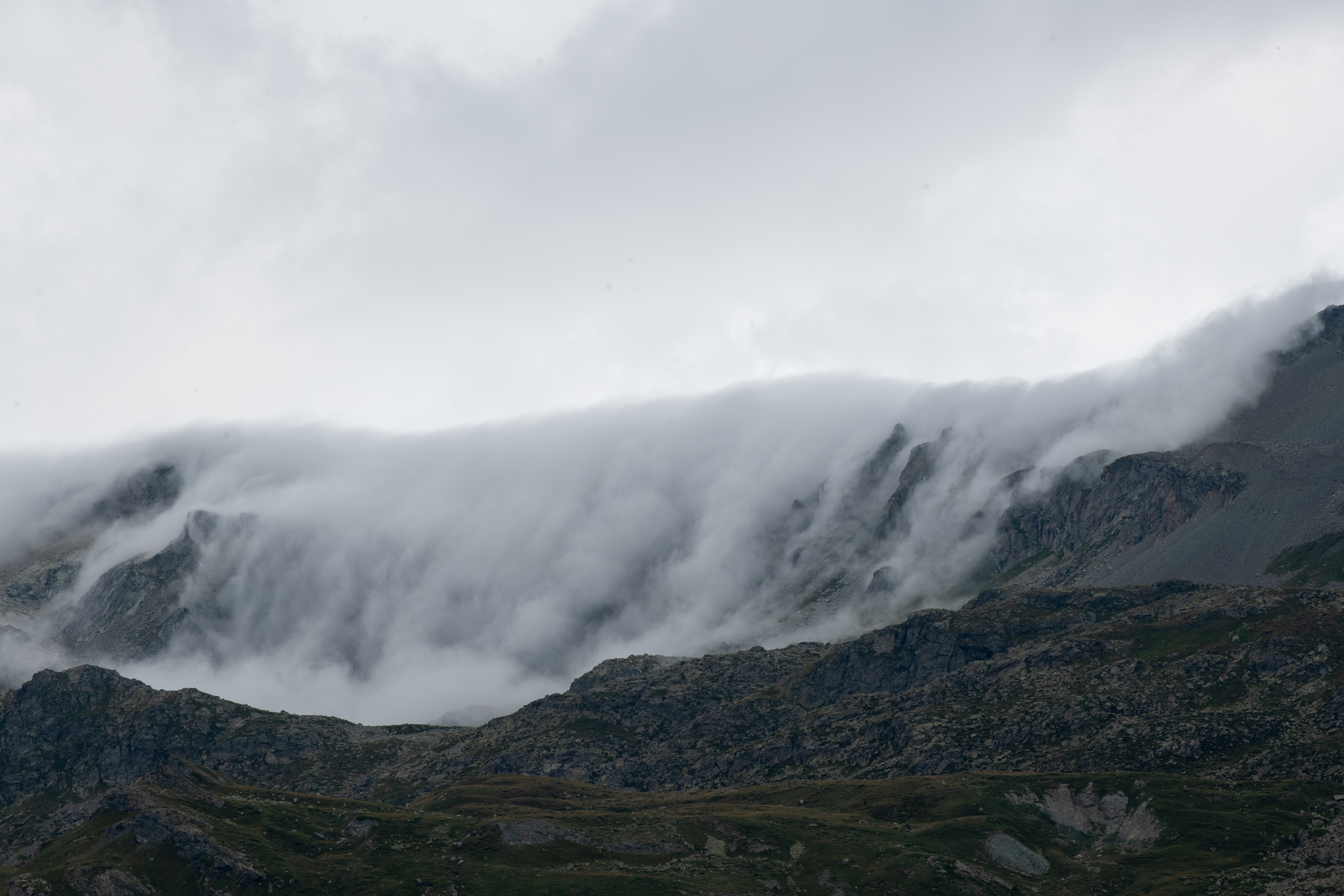
Low-lying clouds produced by the Maloja Wind

The Maloja Wind is a Foehn-type wind that occurs in the upper Engadin in Switzerland. The wind blows up-valley during the nighttime and down-valley during the day, contradicting the typical direction of mountain and valley winds.

The phenomenon is caused by wind from the Val Bregaglia crossing the valley's terminus at Maloja Pass and intruding into the adjoining Engadin. The roughly 1 km-wide Maloja Pass creates a box canyon that blocks moist air from the southern Po Valley from entering the Engadin. When combined with the height difference between Val Bregaglia and the Engadin, the rising air from the latter creates a pressure gradient between the high pressure Val Bregaglia and the low pressure Engadin. The air eventually rises over the Maloja Pass and into the Engadin.

The Maloja Wind reaches a velocity of 20 to 30 knots, with the variation resulting from atmospheric conditions as the wind develops. It is generally less intense in evenings due to reduced insolation.

=== Maloja Snake ===
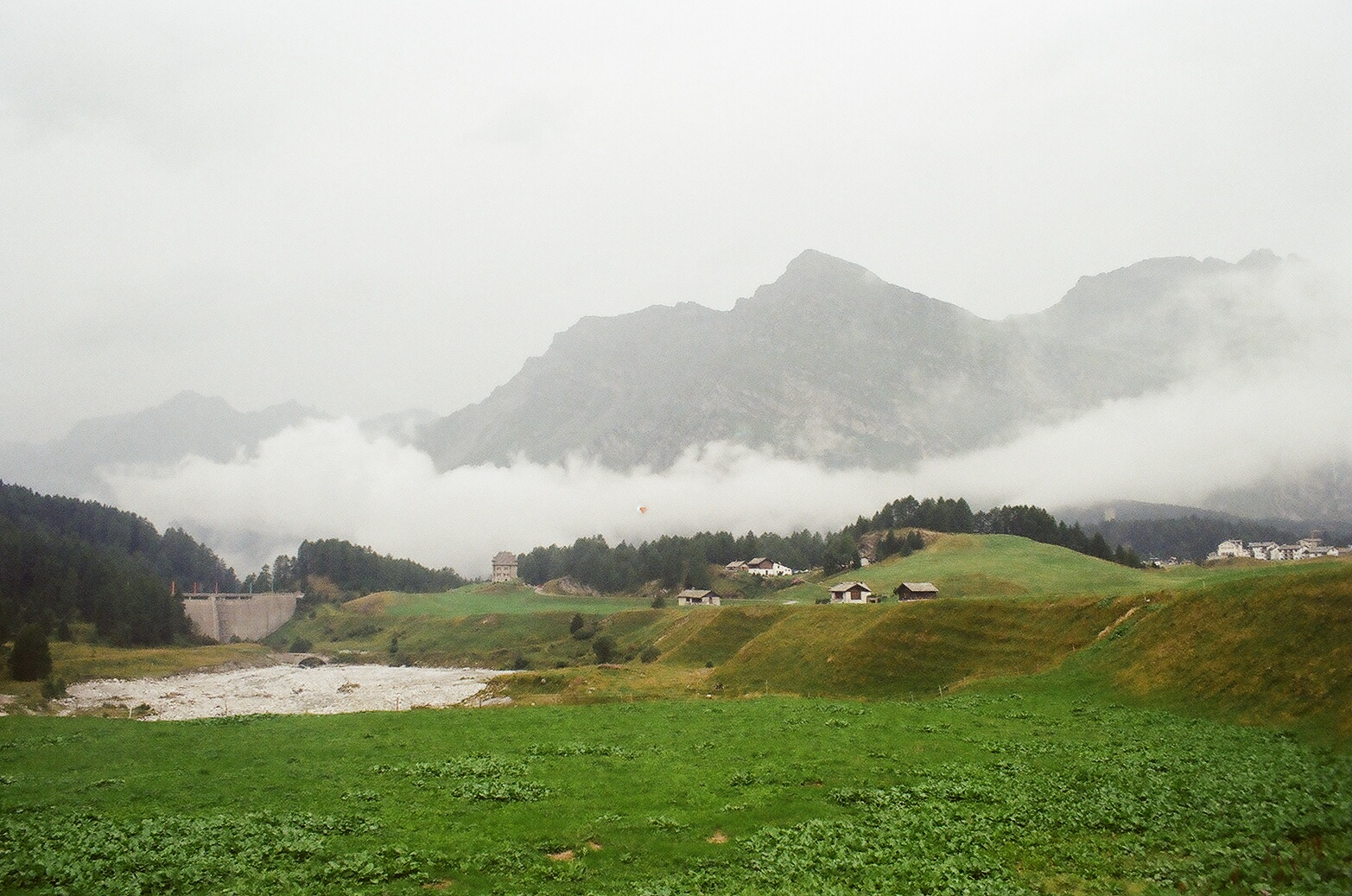
The Maloja Snake

If the dew point in the Maloja Pass is met as a Maloja Wind passes, a low-lying cloud begins to form. The cloud takes on a narrow and elongated form as it is shaped by the walls of the valley, which shear and rotate its flow. This phenomenon is known as the "Maloja Snake", so named because of the long, serpentine shape of the resulting cloud. The Maloja Snake typically forms roughly 500 to 700 metres above ground level, and is roughly 50 metres thick. It travels through the Engadin and generally dissipates over Lake Sils and Lake Silvaplana, but can reach as far as St. Moritz.

== In popular culture ==
The Maloja Snake is depicted in the 2014 film Clouds of Sils Maria. In the film, "Maloja Snake" is additionally the title of a play by fictional Swiss playwright Wilhelm Melchior, which depicts a tumultuous romance between two women. The film is credited with bringing popular attention to the Maloja Snake phenomenon.

== Other examples ==
Two valleys that drain from Mount Rainier in Washington produce Maloja Wind-like effects. They are the only valleys in the United States where these effects have been documented.

== See also ==
- Anabatic wind
- Katabatic wind
