= RMS Mooltan =

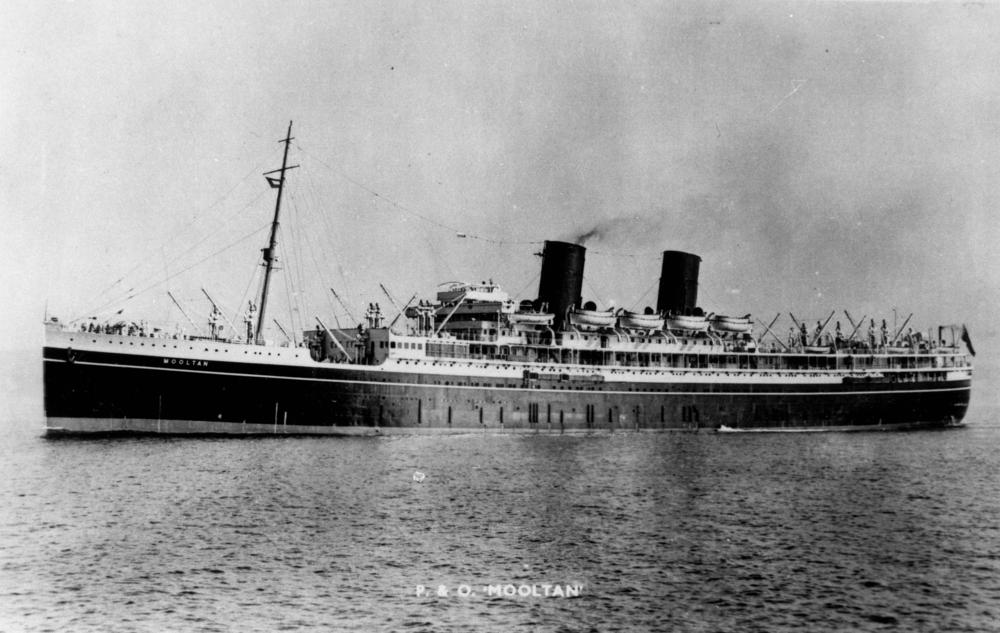
- Mooltan under way

History

United Kingdom
- Name: RMS Mooltan (1923–39, 1941–54); HMS Mooltan (F75) (1939–41)
- Namesake: Multan, Punjab
- Owner: P&O
- Operator: P&O SN Co (1923–39, 1941–54) (United Kingdom) Royal Navy (1939–41)
- Port of registry: (United Kingdom) Belfast
- Route: Tilbury – Australia
- Ordered: 29 November 1918
- Builder: Harland & Wolff, Belfast
- Yard number: 587
- Launched: 15 February 1923
- Completed: 22 September 1923
- Maiden voyage: 5 October 1923
- Identification: UK official number: 145435; Code letters: KPNG (until 1933); Call sign: GFBC (from 1934)
- Fate: Scrapped 1954

General characteristics
- Type: Ocean liner
- Tonnage: 20,847 GRT; tonnage under deck 17,305; 12,823 NRT; 16,032 DWT
- Length: 600.8 ft (183.1 m) pp
- Beam: 73.4 ft (22.4 m)
- Draught: 34 ft 10 in (10.6 m)
- Depth: 48.6 ft (14.8 m)
- Decks: 5
- Installed power: after 1929: 2,878 NHP; 15,300 shp (11,400 kW)
- Propulsion: 8 oil-fired 215 psi (1,480 kPa) boilers; 2 × 4-cylinder quadruple-expansion steam engines; plus (after 1929) turbo generators & electric motors; twin screws
- Speed: (after 1929) 17.5 kn (32.4 km/h)
- Capacity: Passengers: 327 first class; 329 second class
- Crew: 423: 10 officers; 94 seamen; 22 engineers; 82 firemen; 215 saloon crew; plus 174 gunners (during World War II)
- Armament: 2 × BL 6 inch Mk XII naval guns; 2 × QF 3 inch 20 cwt anti-aircraft guns; 1 × Bofors 40 mm anti-aircraft gun; 10 × Oerlikon 20 mm cannon anti-aircraft guns; 4 × .303 calibre Hotchkiss machine guns; 1 × rocket launcher; 1 × barrage balloon

RMS Mooltan was an ocean liner and Royal Mail Ship of P&O. She was ordered in 1918 and completed in 1923. She served in World War II first as the armed merchant cruiser HMS Mooltan (F75) and then as a troop ship. She was retired from P&O service in 1953 and scrapped in 1954.

Mooltan was unusual in combining both quadruple-expansion steam engines and turbo-electric transmission. When completed in 1923 she had only her quadruple-expansion engines, but in 1929 turbo generators and electric propulsion motors were added alongside them to increase her speed.

== Building ==
P&O ordered Mooltan and her sister RMS Maloja from Harland & Wolff on 29 November 1918. Mooltan was given yard number 587. She was launched on 15 January 1923, completed on 22 September 1923, undertook sea trials and was handed over to her owners on 21 September 1923.

She was named Mooltan after the city of Multan in the Punjab, and an earlier "RMS Mooltan (1905–1917)", that was lost to enemy action in 1917, which was in turn named after a still earlier "SS Mooltan (1861–1884)", a P&O's screw steamer whose maiden voyage was from Southampton in 1861. This ship was withdrawn from service in 1874 and laid up in London. In 1880, she was sold to Messrs Elles & Co of Liverpool, and again to J. J. Wallace of London. In 1884 she was sold again, this time to J. Pedley of London, and renamed the "Eleanor Margaret" and underwent conversion to a four masted barque. In 1888 sold yet again to J. D. Bischoff of Bremen. In 1891, she sailed from Newcastle upon Tyne for Valparaíso, and was reported missing in the North Atlantic. Last known position being 45°N, 25°W.

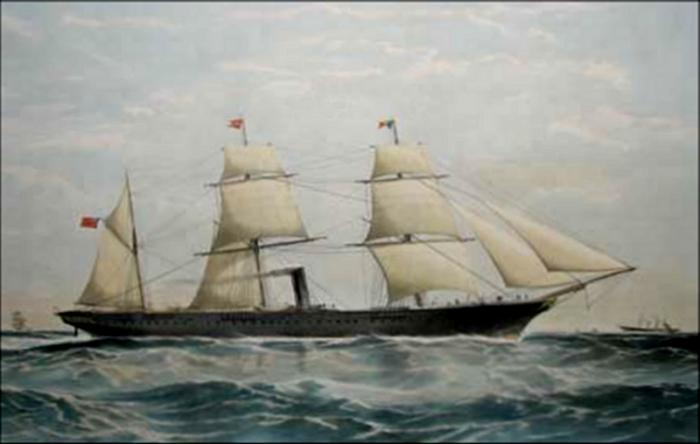
SS Mooltan, 1865 lithograph by Thomas Dutton

The new Mooltan was the first P&O ship to exceed 20,000 tons. She had 56 corrugated furnaces heating six double-ended and two single-ended boilers that had a combined heating surface of 41,358 square feet (3,842 m^{2}). These supplied steam at 215 lb_{f}/in^{2} to her two four-cylinder inverted direct acting quadruple-expansion steam engines.

Mooltan had broad decks and gained a reputation for great steadiness, but her speed was sacrificed for reliability and comfort. She had a small rudder that impaired handling. She had two funnels, but the second was a dummy that served as an engine room ventilator rather than a smokestack.

Mooltan was finished in P&O's traditional colours: her hull black with a white band, her boot topping red, her upper works and lifeboats buff, her large vents black, her small vents buff and her two funnels black.

== Pre-war service ==
Mooltan started her maiden voyage on 5 October 1923. She left the Port of Tilbury, sailed via Suez Canal and called at Colombo, Ceylon (Sri Lanka) and Melbourne before reaching Sydney, Australia on 21 December 1923.

In 1929 Mooltan's engines were supplemented with British Thomson-Houston exhaust-driven turbo generators powering electric propulsion motors. The addition of turbo-electric power alongside her original quadruple-expansion engines increased her total installed power to 2,878 NHP and raised her top speed to 17 knots (31 km/h). Her accommodation was also revised.

In 1931 all her accommodation was again revised and improved. In 1933 Mooltan carried Douglas Jardine's MCC cricket test team home to England after the controversial "Bodyline" Test Series. In 1938 she was altered to allow her to carry chilled beef.

== War service ==
On 6 September 1939, just after the outbreak of the Second World War, Mooltan was requisitioned to be an armed merchant cruiser. Her conversion included removing her dummy second funnel to improve the arc of her anti-aircraft guns. Later on in the war the funnel was replaced but in a shorter form. On 15 October 1939 she was commissioned into the Royal Navy as HMS Mooltan (F75).

Her naval service was divided between the South Atlantic Station (October 1939 – April 1940 and June – July 1940) and the Freetown Escort Force (May 1940 and August 1940 – January 1941). Mooltan did not lose any of the merchant vessels that she escorted. On 31 July 1940 she was in the Western Approaches en route from Plymouth to Freetown when a German reconnaissance aircraft attacked her, but she survived intact.

On 20 January 1941 Mooltan was returned for conversion to a Ministry of War Transport troop ship. The work was started by R&H Green and Silley Weir Ltd in Tilbury and completed at Newcastle upon Tyne by May 1941. In 1941 she carried troops out to the Middle East.

In October – November 1942 Mooltan took part in Operation Torch. She carried US Army troops from Britain to land at Arzew, about 15 miles (24 kilometres) east of Oran in French Algeria. The troops embarked at Bristol, England, and on 22 October 1942 they were joined by a few USAAF Twelfth Air Force anti-aircraft artillery (AAA) officers commanded by a Colonel Franklin K. Fagan, who was ordered to organise the ship's air defence for the voyage. The only gunners aboard were two British Royal Marines, so Fagan selected 174 men from the US 815th Engineer Battalion and got the two Royal Marines to train them all. The Marines then served as pointers for Mooltan's two six-inch guns.

Mooltan sailed to the landing fleet's rendezvous in the Firth of Clyde, where more US troops embarked including the 439th Signal Battalion. The fleet departed from the Clyde on 26 October, with Mooltan stationed on the port rear flank of the convoy. The convoy was not attacked, but Mooltan used her exposed position to give her improvised gun crews plenty of firing practice. The Operation Torch landings started at 0400 hrs on 8 November. At 0800 hrs Mooltan entered the Gulf of Arzew and dropped anchor, and Royal Navy landing craft immediately took her US troops ashore to "Z" Beach.

Mooltan was returned to P&O after the war on 16 July 1947.

== Post-war service ==
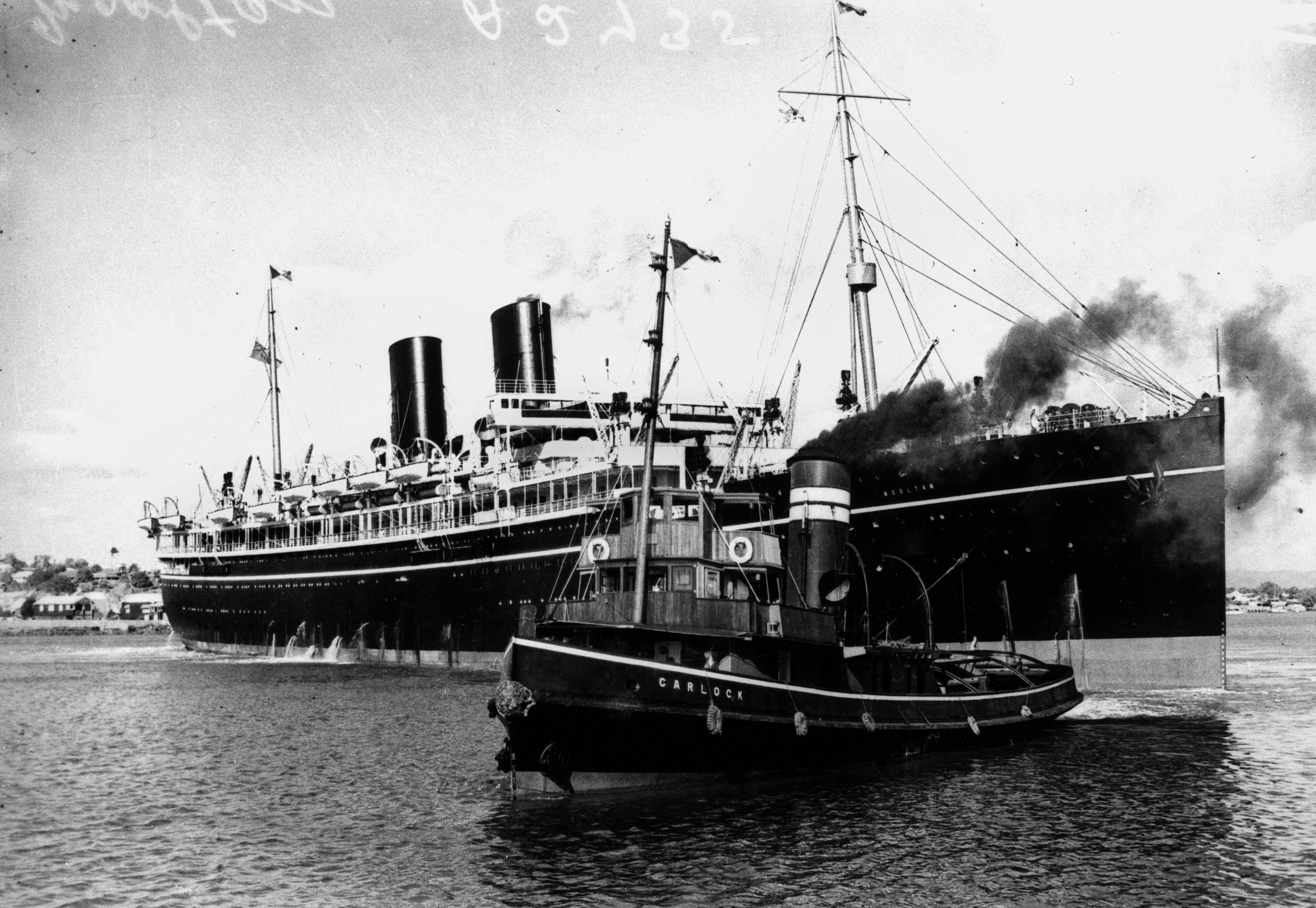
Mooltan being assisted by the tug Carlock at Brisbane

After her return in 1947, P&O had Mooltan completely reconditioned before returning her to commercial use. On 26 August 1948 she returned to service; now she was 21,039 gross register tons (GRT) and carried 1,030 tourist class passengers. Most of the outward traffic was Ministry of Transport emigration work, carrying "Ten Pound Poms" to Australia under an assisted passage scheme established and run by the Australian government. The return trips were filled with P&O's own passengers.

In April 1949 the Mooltan arrived at Tilbury the day after a passenger, 69-year-old Richard Allen, had died. The cause was smallpox, but the passenger list gave his cause of death as chickenpox. For the next three days Mooltan was quarantined before any of her passengers or crew could disembark. In this time five more passengers died.

On 18 November 1953 SS Mooltan left Brisbane, Australia, on her last voyage, reaching Tilbury on 7 January 1954. Her mainly Asian crew joined the brand new RMS Arcadia three weeks later. On 23 January 1954 P&O sold Mooltan for £150,000 to the British Iron & Steel Corporation and she was taken to Metal Industries Ltd at Faslane in Scotland, where she was broken up.

== Sources and further reading ==
- Fagan, Franklin K (November–December 1949). "Antiaircraft Officer with Twelfth A.F. (Africa)" (PDF). Antiaircraft Journal. LXXXXII (6). Washington, DC: United States Coastal Artillery Association: 7–13. Archived from the original (PDF) on 11 May 2013.
- Harnack, Edwin P (1938) [1903]. All About Ships & Shipping (7th ed.). London: Faber and Faber.
- Howarth, David; Howarth, Stephen (1986). The Story of P&O. London: Weidenfeld & Nicolson. ISBN 0-297-78965-1.
- Padfield, Peter (1981). Beneath the House Flag of the P&O. London: Hutchinson. ISBN 0-09-145760-2.
- Rabson, Stephen; O'Donoghue, Kevin (1989). P&O (Peninsular and Oriental): A Fleet History. World Ship Society. ISBN 0905617452.
- Talbot-Booth, E.C. (1942) [1936]. Ships and the Sea (Seventh ed.). London: Sampson Low, Marston & Co. Ltd.

== Links ==
- "Harland and Wolff". titanic-titanic.com. 6 May 2013.
