= Val Forno =

Coordinates: 46.325833°N 9.700556°E

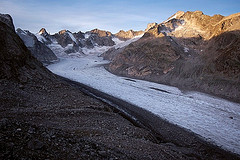
Forno Glacier

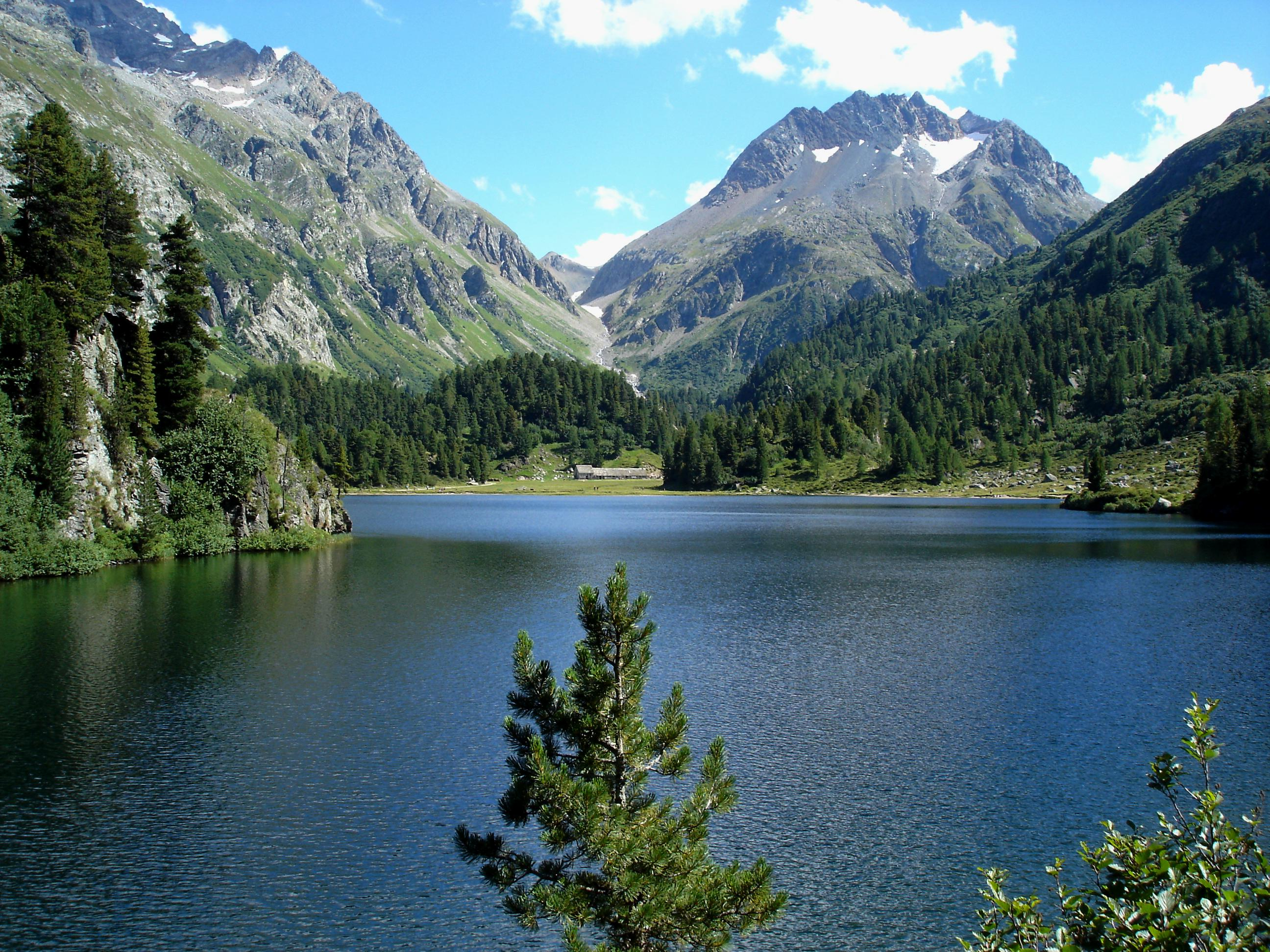
Lägh da Cavloc with Monte del Forno in the background

Val Forno (German: Fornotal) is a valley south of Maloja in the Swiss canton of Grisons with the Forno Glacier at the head of the valley.

== Description ==
The river Orlegna originates from the glacier and flows through the valley. At Plan Canin the valley forks: to the southwest lies the upper Val Forno with the Forno glacier, to the southeast the side valley Val Muretto towards the Muretto Pass (crossing to Italy).

Further down the valley lies the Lägh da Cavloc.

A hiking trail leads from Maloja through the entire Val Forno to the Forno Glacier and the Forno hut on the slope east of the glacier. The trail is easy until the Lägh da Cavloc and then becomes increasingly stony and challenging towards the glacier.
