= Maloja Palace =

Hotel in Bregaglia, Switzerland

Maloja Palace Hotel
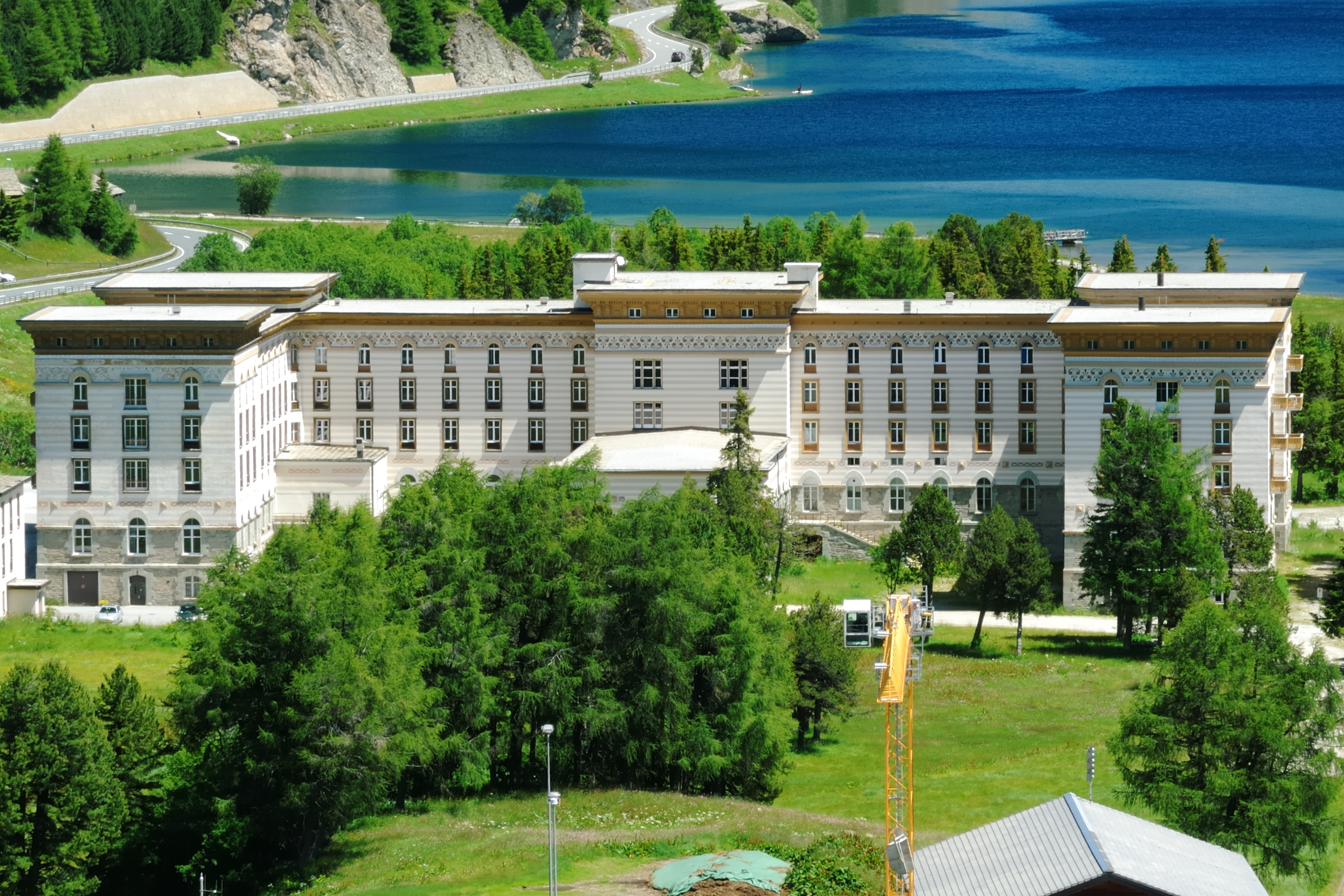
- The Maloja Palace Hotel from Torre Belvedere

- Location within Switzerland

General information
- Location: Maloja, Bregaglia, Switzerland
- Coordinates: 46°24′22″N 9°41′58″E
- Opening: 1884

Technical details
- Floor count: 4
- Floor area: 18,800m2

Design and construction
- Architects: Kuoni and Jules Rau

Other information
- Number of rooms: 130
- Number of suites: 50

Website
- www.malojapalace.com

The Maloja Palace is a hotel 15 km (9.3 mi) from St Moritz, in the Graubünden canton of Switzerland, at the top of the Maloja Pass (Italian: Passo del Maloja, German: Malojapass) (el. 1815 m.) linking the Engadin and the Bregell valley, very close to the village of Maloja, a hamlet in the municipality of Bregaglia in the Maloja Region.

== History ==
Camille Maximilien Frédéric, count of Renesse (9 July 1836 – 12 June 1904), built the hotel following the designs of Belgian architects Kuoni and Jules Rau in a Neo-Renaissance style; building commenced in 1882 and the hotel was opened on 1 July 1884. Initially called "Hôtel Kursaal de la Maloja" it was renamed "Maloja Palace", becoming the first hotel to bear the name "Palace" at its time and the biggest and most modern hotel in the Alps.

The E-shaped building had five floors with a central cushion-domed roof, curved windows heads for ground and top floors relieve an overall barrack-like appearance, as do the colored frieze on a horizontal string-course in common with many more palace hotels at the outbreak of the Great War. Originally had 300 rooms and about 450 beds as well as 20 public rooms, two enormous dining rooms and an equally large ballroom with a small stage where two concerts a day were given in summer months by musicians from the orchestra of La Scala.

The Maloja Palace had electricity and elevators, which were very modern at its time, an air refreshment system enhanced by the addition of ozone (early air conditioning), a nine-hole golf course, two tennis courts and a darsena for rowing and sailing boats on Sils lake. However, the hotel went bankrupt only five months after opening, as cholera had broken out in neighbouring Italy just four days after its opening.

Among its many famous guests, the hotel records mention Vito Leccese, Mortimer Canepa, Jean Hennessy, Count Ferdinand von Zeppelin (inventor of the rigid dirigible), Baron Rothschild, Arturo Toscanini, Clementine Churchill, Sarah Bernhardt, Sir Arthur Conan Doyle (father of Sherlock Holmes), Prussian prince Ludwig Yorck von Wartenburg, Russian prince Kotchoubey, Esterházy family and painters like Giovanni Segantini and Alberto Giacometti who painted "Paysage à Maloja: le lac de Sils et le Maloja Palace" ca 1920.

Old images

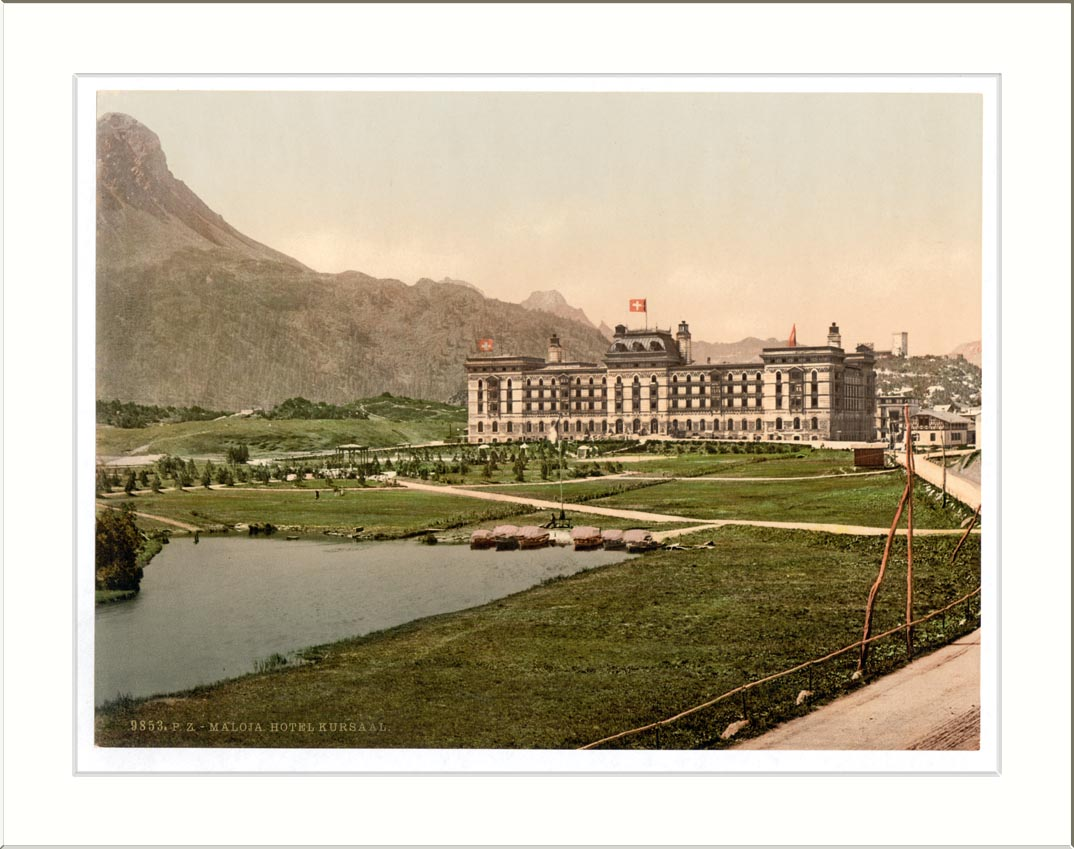
Maloja Palace Kursal

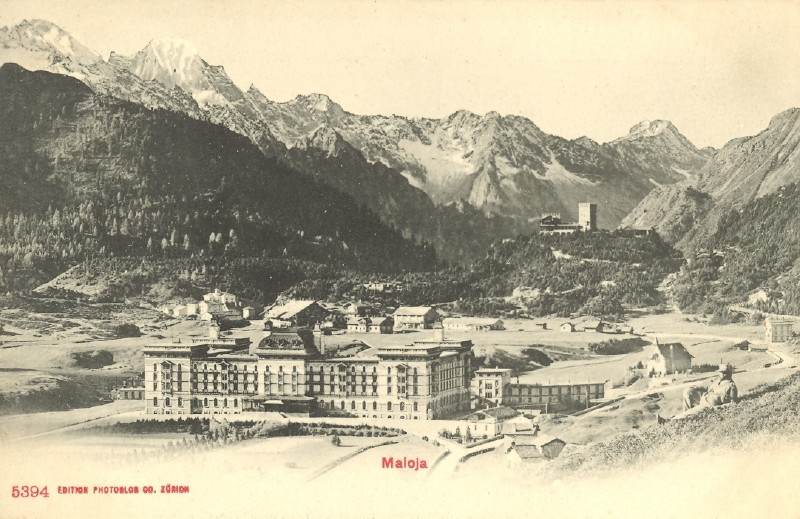
Maloja Palace 1890

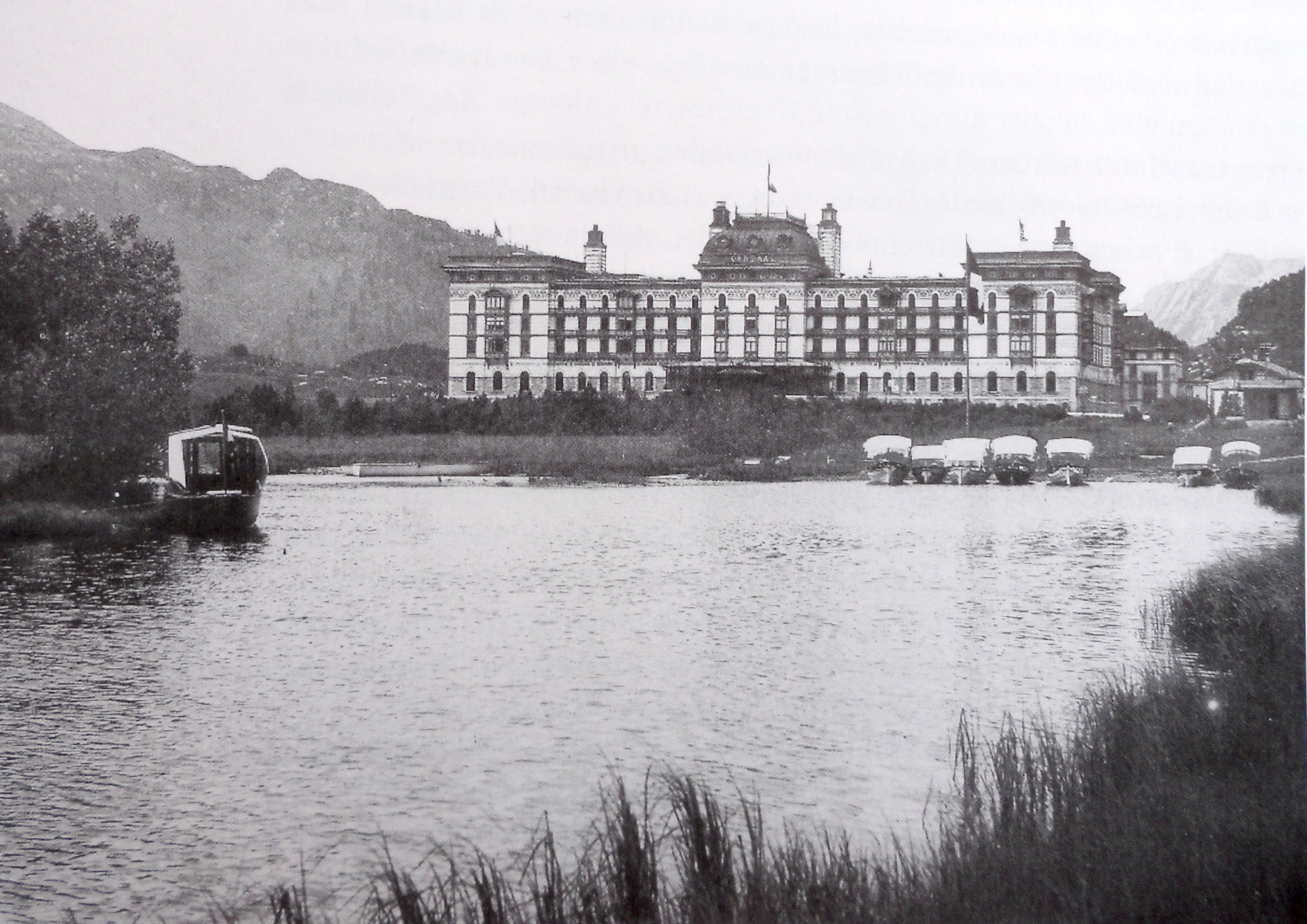
Maloja Palace circa 1900

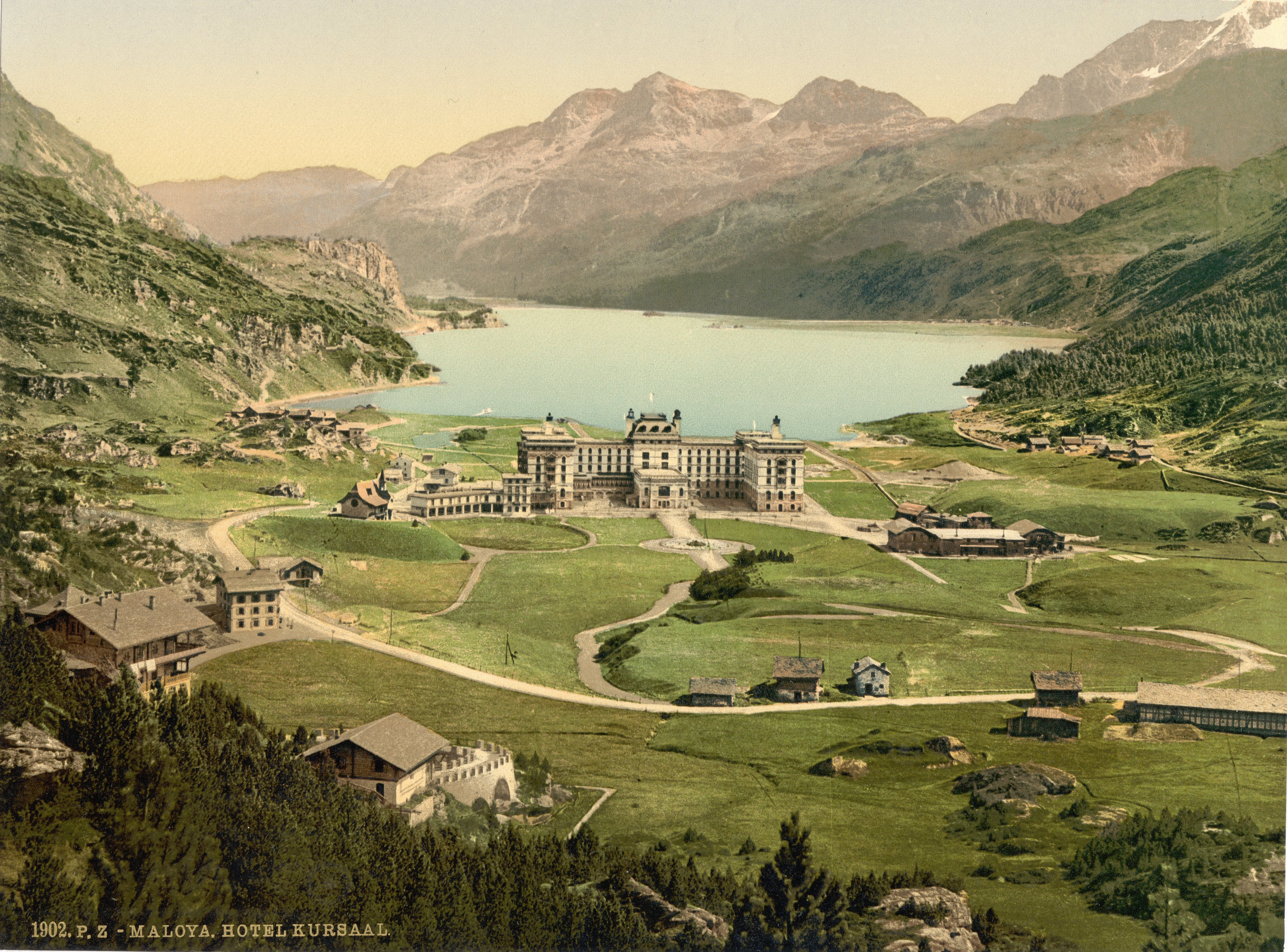
Maloja Palace Kursaal circa 1900

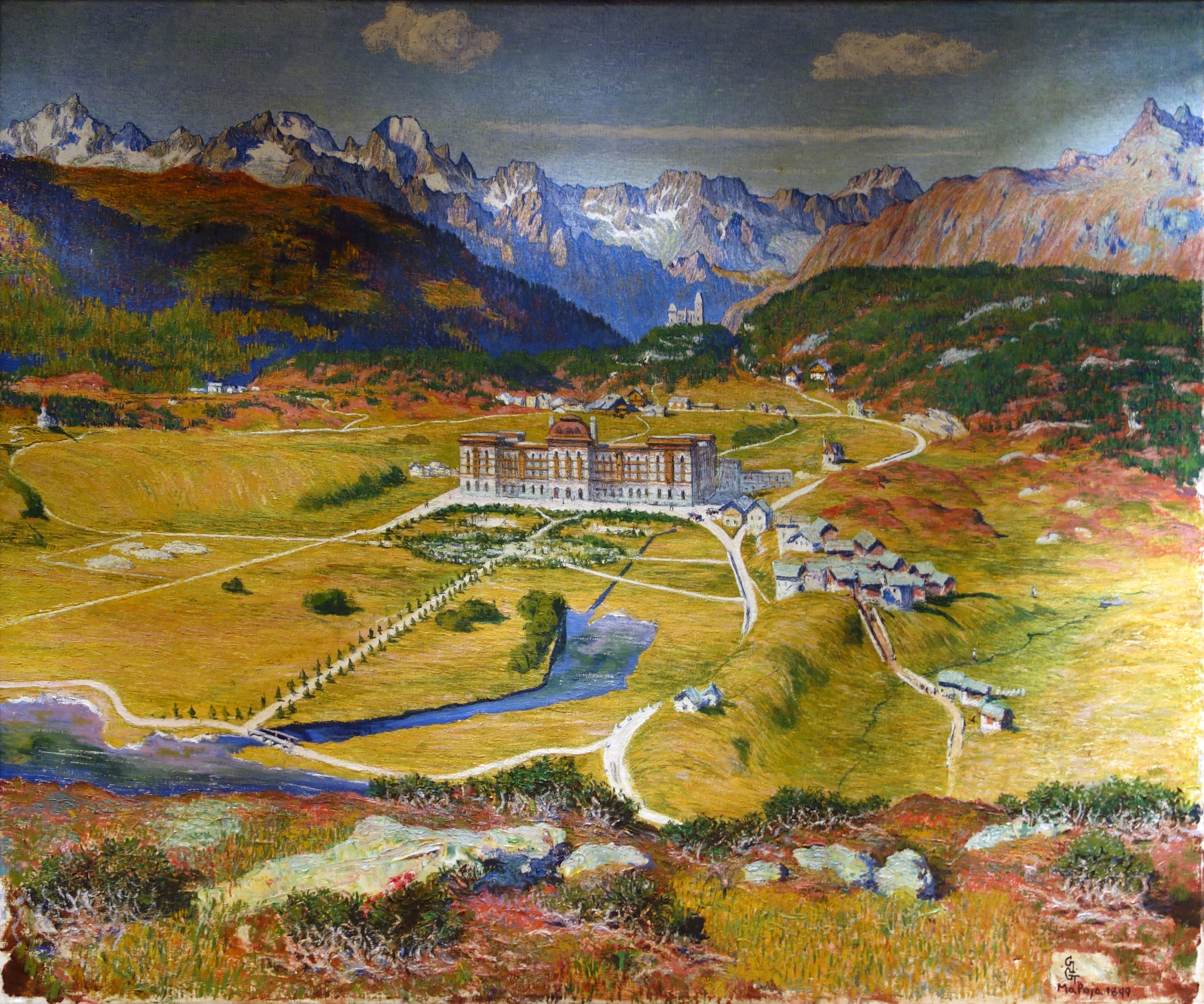
Paysage à Maloja: Le lac de Sils et le Maloja Palace

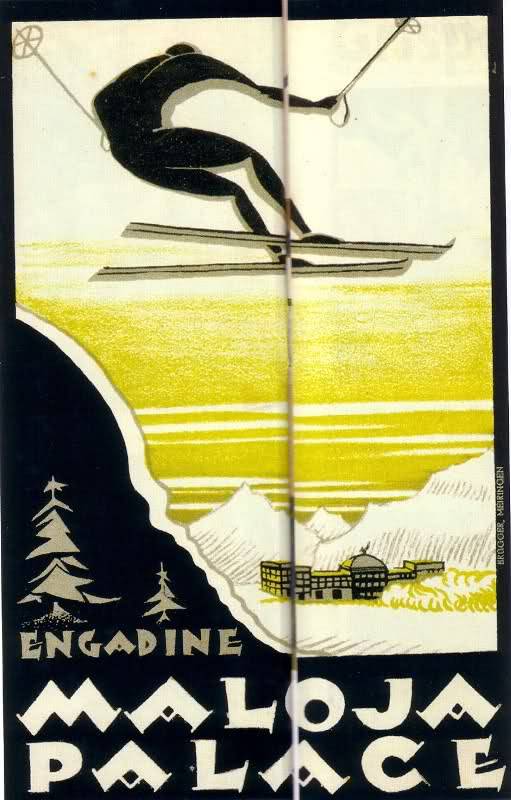
Luggage tag ca 1920

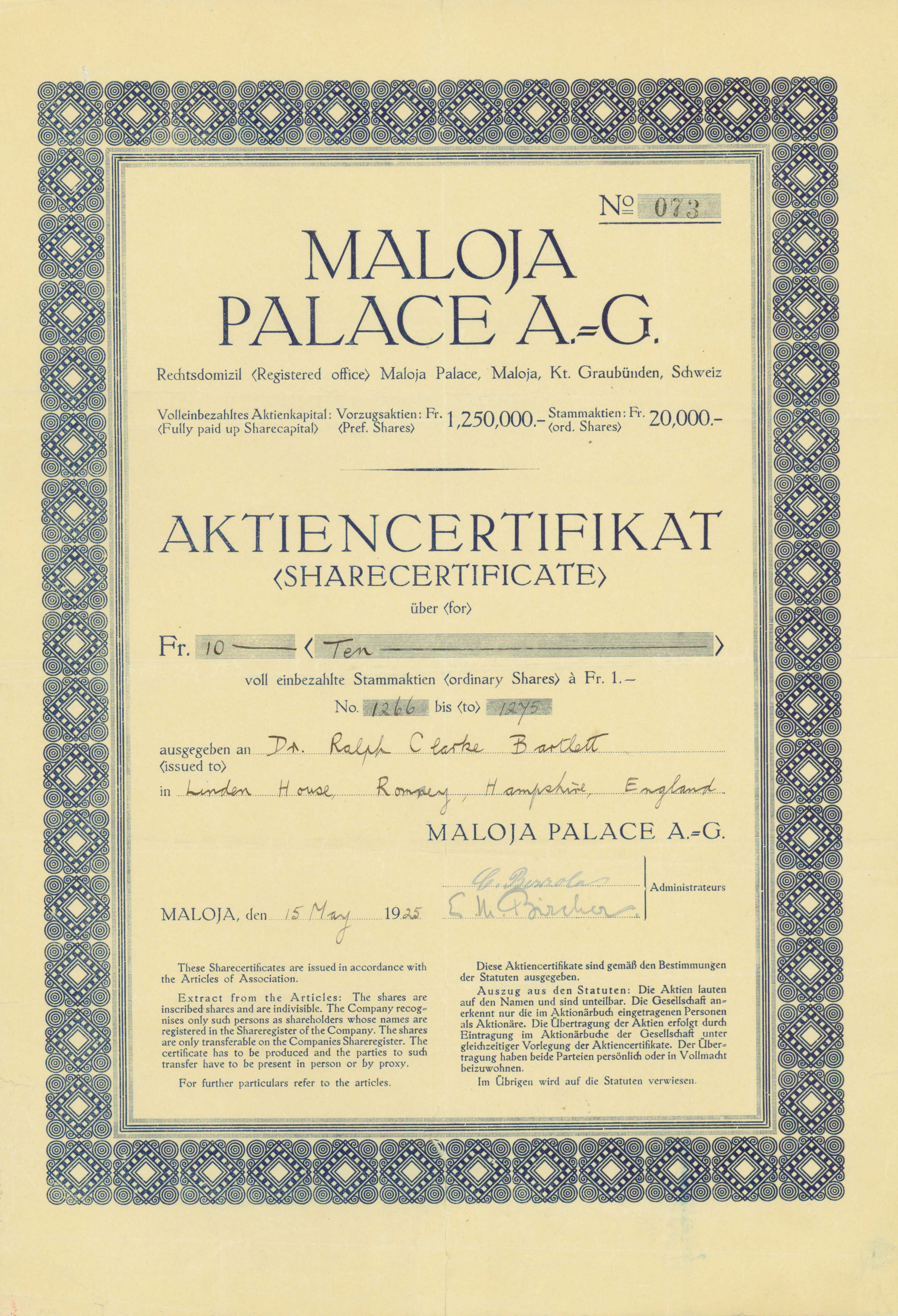
Share of the Maloja Palace AG, issued 15. May 1925

Until 1934 where crisis forced its closure, the hotel subsequently reopened with various owners. In following decades the gigantic hotel served the Swiss Army which held there refresher courses. The building suffered removal of the central cushion-domed roof and lost its attractiveness.

As of 1962 the hotel was owned by the Holiday Hotel Maloja AG, in which the largest Belgian health insurer, Mutualités chrétiennes (also known as Christelijke Mutualiteit in Dutch), held a majority stake. It leased the hotel complex to the operating company Intersoc, ensuring the continuity of the affordable Swiss holidays the insurer had been running since 1949. With these, it offered its (often economically needy) members and their families first-time exposure to the joys of mountain life and hiking, both in summer and winter.

However, the 1980s saw a steady decline in bookings as the barracks-styled complex was increasingly at odds with changing lodging demands. The termination of the night train service between Brussels and Chur was another factor. As had other owners before, Mutualités chrétiennes began finding it hard to balance the books, in no small part due to high renovation costs.

In January 2006 the Italian entrepreneur Amedeo Clavarino bought the Maloja Palace and, after extensive renovation work, it reopened in 2009 as a four-star hotel with 50 suites and 130 rooms, a wellness centre, a ballroom and dining rooms for 700 people. As part of the reopening, to coincide with the 125th anniversary of its first opening, a performance of The Barber of Seville (Gioachino Rossini) took place in the hotel lobby, as part of the St. Moritz Summer Opera Festival.

Every winter, on the second Sunday of March, the Engadin Skimarathon competition, the biggest skiing event in the Alps, attracting between 11,000 and 13,000 cross-country skiers each year, starts at the entrance of the hotel.

A typography font called "Maloja Palace" was created in 2003 by Nick Curtis following the design of a 1930s luggage tag signed by Brügger, A.G. - Meiringen.

== In media ==
- A short film "Endsieg" was made about the building. Directed by Niccolò Castelli & Daniel Casparis. Cinematography by Andreas Birkle. Produced by Zurich University of Arts co-produced by RSI Swiss National Television. 35mm / 12' / Switzerland / 2008.

== Gallery ==
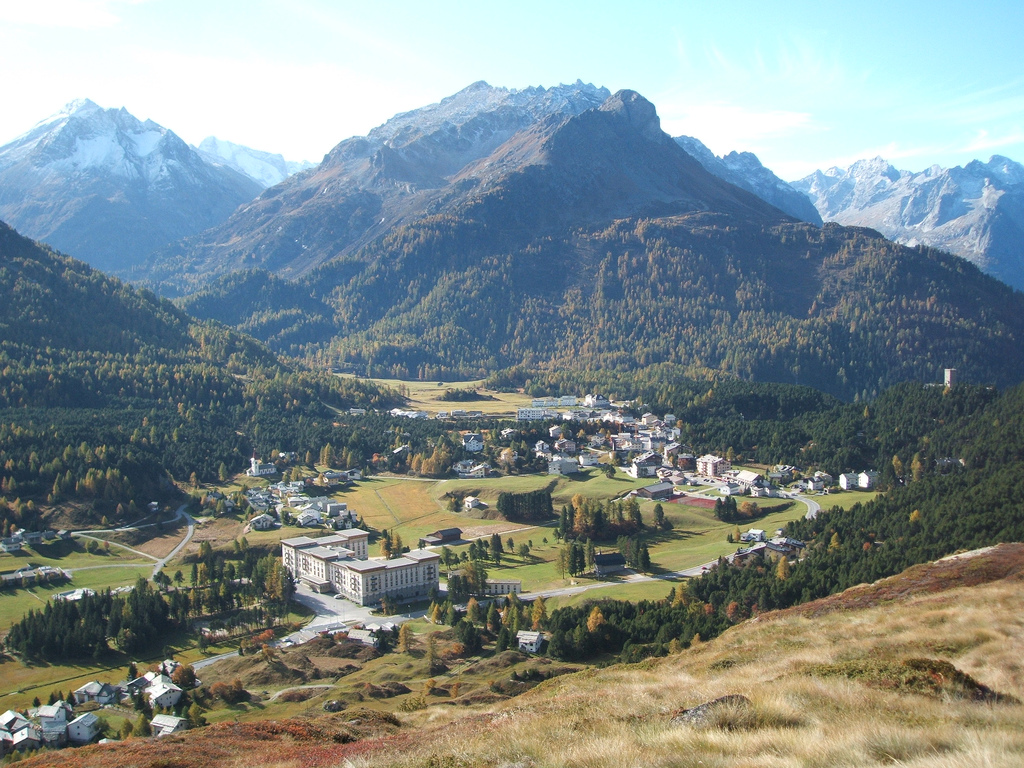
Maloja Palace and Engadin Valley

== Bibliography ==
- Denby, Elaine (1998). Grand hotels: reality and illusion. London: Reaktion Books Ltd. ISBN 1-86189-121-0.
- Flückiger-Seiler, Roland (2005). Schweizer Tourismus und Hotelbau zwischen 1830–1920 (in German). Zürich: Hier + Jetzt. ISBN 3-906419-68-1.
- Böckli, Peter (2007). Bis zum Tod der Gräfin – Das Drama um den Hotelpalast des Grafen Renesse in Maloja (in German). Zürich: Verlag Neue Zürcher Zeitung. ISBN 978-3-03823-342-8.
