= Lägh da Cavloc =

Lake in the Grisons, Switzerland

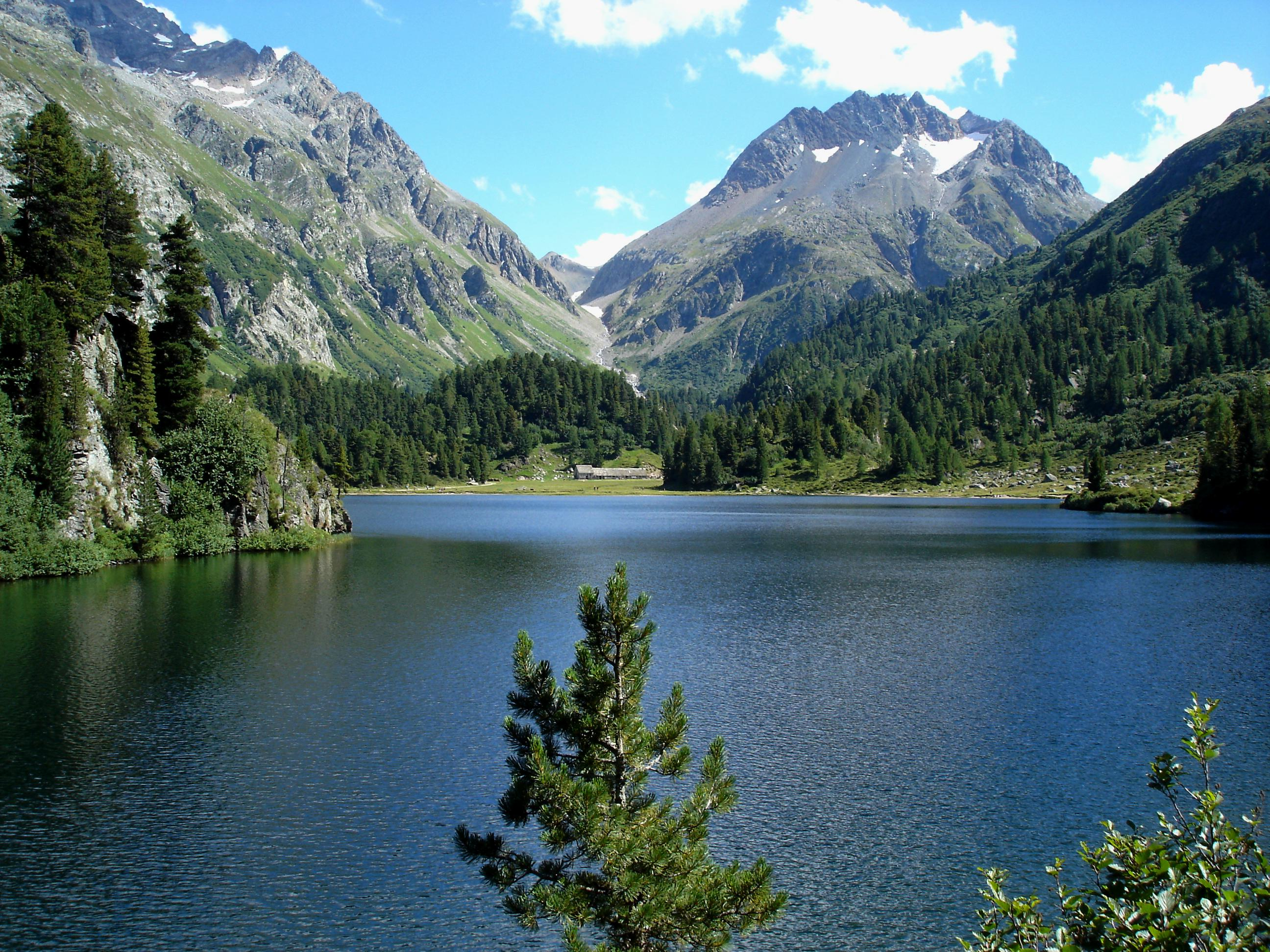

- Location within Canton of Graubünden Location within Switzerland Location within Italy Location within Alps
- Interactive map of Lägh da Cavloc
- Location: Maloja Pass, Grisons
- Coordinates: 46°22′48″N 9°42′17″E
- Basin countries: Switzerland
- Surface area: 12 ha (30 acres)
- Max. depth: 17 m (56 ft)
- Surface elevation: 1,907 m (6,257 ft)

Lägh da Cavloc (Italian: Lago di Cavloccio) is a lake near Maloja Pass in the Val Forno, Grisons, Switzerland.

While the northern shore is rocky and lined with pine trees, there is a beach on the shallow southern shore that is a popular swimming spot despite the cold water temperature.

There is a mountain restaurant at the lake and the Alp da Cavloc is located south of the lake.

== Access ==
The lake can be reached on an easy hiking trail from Maloja in about an hour's hiking time. In winter, the trail is groomed as a winter hiking trail and cross-country ski trail.

== Art and culture ==
The lake was painted by Giovanni Giacometti in 1922.

== See also ==
- List of mountain lakes of Switzerland
