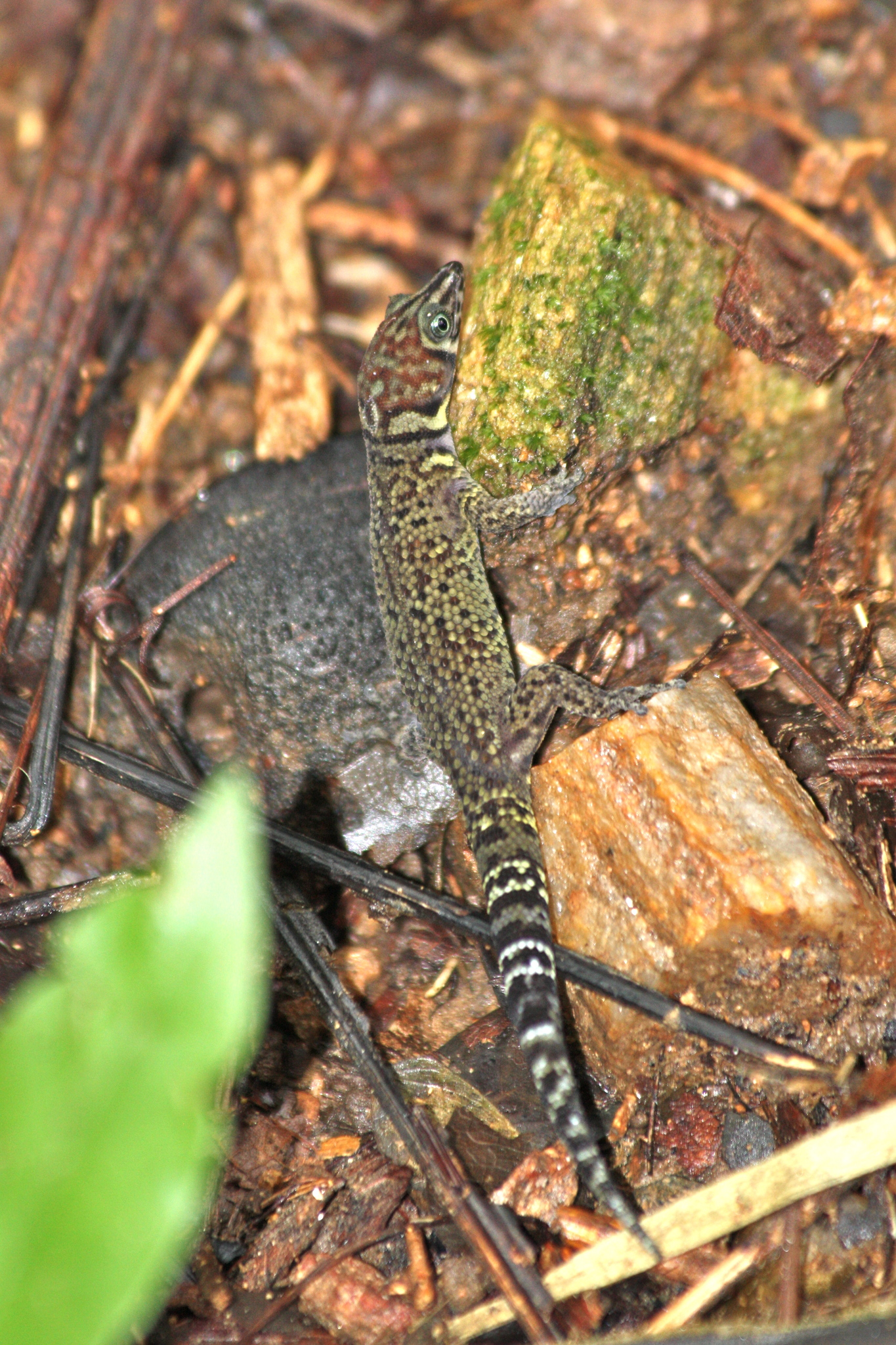

Conservation status
- Least Concern (IUCN 3.1)

Scientific classification
- Kingdom: Animalia
- Phylum: Chordata
- Class: Reptilia
- Order: Squamata
- Suborder: Gekkota
- Family: Sphaerodactylidae
- Genus: Sphaerodactylus
- Species: S. rosaurae

Binomial name
- Sphaerodactylus rosaurae Parker, 1940

= Bay Island least gecko =

Species of lizard

The Bay Island least gecko (Sphaerodactylus rosaurae) is a species of lizard in the family Sphaerodactylidae. The species is endemic to the Bay Islands in Honduras.

== Etymology ==
The specific name, rosaurae, refers to Lord Moyne's yacht Rosaura, from which the holotype was collected.

== Habitat ==
The preferred habitat of S. rosaurae is forest at altitudes of 0–20 m (0–66 ft).

== Reproduction ==
S. rosaurae is oviparous.
