= SS Dieppe (1905) =

Steam passenger ferry

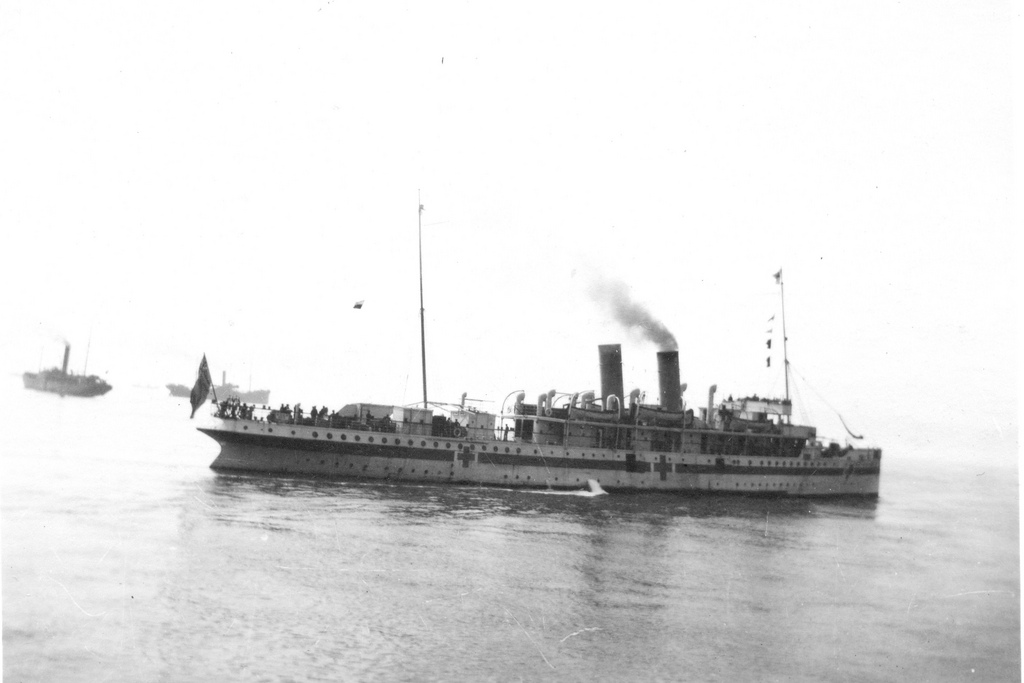
- HMHS Dieppe (1905)

History

United Kingdom
- Name: SS Dieppe (1905– ); HMS Dieppe (WWI); SS Dieppe ( –1933); MY Rosaura (1933– ); HMS Rosaura (–1941)
- Owner: London, Brighton and South Coast Railway (1905– ); Royal Navy (WWI); London, Brighton and South Coast Railway ( –1922); Southern Railway (1923–33); W E Guinness (1933–40); Royal Navy (1940–41)
- Port of registry: (United Kingdom) Newhaven(1905– ); (United Kingdom) Royal Navy (WWI); (United Kingdom) Newhaven ( –1933); (United Kingdom) Cowes (1933–40); (United Kingdom) Royal Navy (1940–41)
- Route: Newhaven — Dieppe (1905–33)
- Builder: Fairfield Shipbuilding & Engineering Co Ltd, Govan
- Yard number: 439
- Launched: 5 April 1905
- Completed: May 1905
- Out of service: 18 March 1941
- Identification: UK official number 105655; Code letters HCRB (1905–33)
- Fate: Struck a mine and sank

General characteristics
- Tonnage: 1,210 GRT (1905– ); 1,426 GRT ( –1933); 1,538 GRT (1933–41); 301 NRT (1905– ); 565 NRT ( –1933)
- Length: 273 ft 5 in (83.34 m)
- Beam: 34 ft 8 in (10.57 m)
- Depth: 13 ft 8 in (4.17 m)
- Installed power: 3 × steam turbines (1905–33); 2 × diesel engines (1933–41)
- Propulsion: Triple propellers (1905–33); Twin propellers (1933–41)
- Speed: 22 knots (41 km/h) (1905–33); 15 knots (28 km/h) (1933–41)

Dieppe was a steam passenger ferry that was built in 1905 for the London, Brighton and South Coast Railway. She was requisitioned during the First World War for use as a troopship and later as a hospital ship HMS Dieppe, returning to her owners postwar. She passed to the Southern Railway on 1 January 1923. In 1933 she was sold to W E Guinness and converted to a private diesel yacht, Rosaura. She was requisitioned in the Second World War for use as an armed boarding vessel, HMS Rosaura. She struck a mine and sank off Tobruk, Libya on 18 March 1941.

== Description ==
The ship was built by Fairfield Shipbuilding & Engineering Co Ltd, Govan. She was yard number 439 and was launched on 6 April 1905 with completion in May 1905. The ship was 273 feet 5 inches (83.34 m) long, with a beam of 34 feet 8 inches (10.57 m) and a depth of 13 feet 8 inches (4.17 m). She was powered by three steam turbines, which were made by Fairfield. The turbines could propel her at a speed of 22 knots (41 km/h). When converted to a private yacht, the turbines were replaced by two 8-cylinder Atlas diesel engines. One of her propellers was removed as was one of her funnels. Her speed was reduced to 15 knots (28 km/h). As built, her GRT was 1,210. This had increased to 1,426 by 1930, and further increased to 1,536 in 1933.

== History ==
Dieppe was built for the London, Brighton and South Coast Railway. She was used on their Newhaven — Dieppe route. She was requisitioned by the Royal Navy in the First World War for use as a troopship and a hospital ship. On 27 February 1916 she took aboard over 100 survivors from the 12,431 GRT P&O passenger liner Maloja, which was sunk by a mine off Dover.

Dieppe was returned to her owners after the war and passed to the Southern Railway at 1923 grouping. On 27 November 1924 Dieppe had a mishap in which she ended up hitting the breakwater at Newhaven Harbour stern first. The tugs Alert and Richmere were sent to her aid. Richmere became disabled when a cable became entangled around her propeller. The Newhaven lifeboat Sir Fitzroy Clayton was sent to her aid. Richmere ended up being dashed against the harbour wall and sank. Her crew were rescued by the lifeboat and the tug was later raised and repaired. Dieppe managed to dock some five hours after the drama began.

In September 1933, Dieppe was sold to W E Guinness for conversion to a private yacht. She was renamed Rosaura, replacing MY Roussalka which had been lost earlier that year. In August 1934, the Prince of Wales and Wallis Simpson took a cruise on Rosaura. According to Wallis, it was on this cruise that she fell in love with the Prince. Also in 1934, Winston Churchill and his wife Clementine cruised on Rosaura in the eastern Mediterranean. On 26 September 1936, Rosaura was in collision with the Dutch coaster Henca at Amsterdam, Netherlands and was severely damaged. She was subsequently repaired.

Rosaura was requisitioned by the Royal Navy in the Second World War for use as an armed boarding vessel in the Contraband Control Service. In February 1941, Rosaura was involved in Operation Abstention. On 18 March 1941 Rosaura struck a mine off Tobruk and sank, claiming the lives of 78 people.

== Official number and code letters ==
Official numbers were a forerunner to IMO Numbers. Dieppe and Rosaura had the UK Official Number 105655. Dieppe used the code letters HCRB.

== Legacy ==
The yacht Rosaura is commemorated in the scientific name of a species of Honduran gecko, Sphaerodactylus rosaurae.
