= SS Maloja (1910) =

UK registered passenger steamship sunk by a mine off Dover

Coordinates: 51°03′N 1°11′E

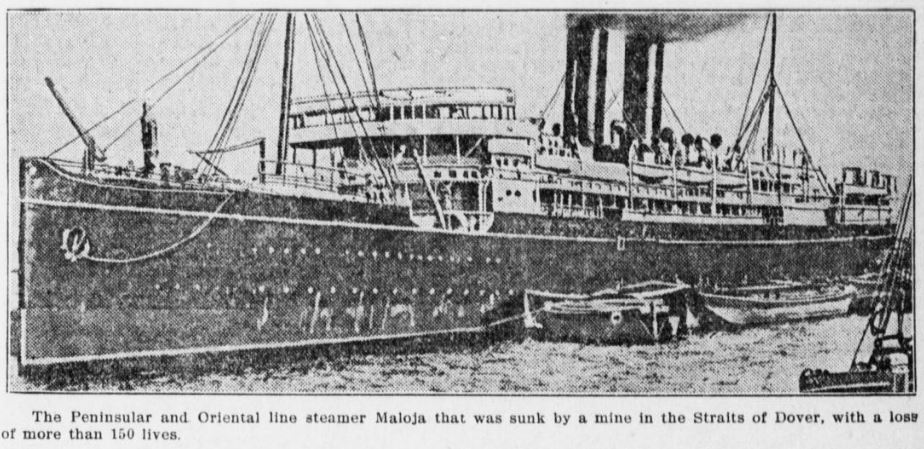
- Peninsula and Oriental line steamer Maloja

History

United Kingdom
- Name: SS Maloja
- Owner: P&O Steam Navigation Co
- Port of registry: (United Kingdom) Belfast
- Route: Tilbury – Bombay
- Builder: Harland and Wolff Ltd, Belfast
- Yard number: 414
- Launched: 17 December 1910
- Completed: 7 September 1911
- Fate: Mined off Dover, 27 February 1916

General characteristics
- Class & type: P&O M-class passenger liner
- Tonnage: 12,431 GRT
- Length: 550.4 ft (167.8 m)
- Beam: 62.9 ft (19.2 m)
- Depth: 34.4 ft (10.5 m)
- Installed power: 1,164 NHP
- Propulsion: 2 quadruple expansion engines; twin screw
- Speed: 19 knots (35 km/h; 22 mph)
- Capacity: 670 passengers
- Crew: 301 (British officers & Lascar crew)
- Armament: Defensively Equipped Merchant Ship

SS Maloja was an M-class passenger steamship of the Peninsular and Oriental Steam Navigation Company. She was completed in 1911 and worked a regular route between Great Britain and India. In 1916 in the First World War she was sunk by a mine in the English Channel off Dover with the loss of 155 lives.

== Building ==
Maloja was one of P&O's ten M-class passenger liners, the first of which had been RMS Moldavia which was completed in 1903. Harland and Wolff Ltd built Maloja, completing her in 1911. She had twin screws driven by twin quadruple expansion engines that were rated at 1,164 NHP and gave her a speed of 19 knots (35 km/h). She had capacity for 670 passengers plus a quantity of cargo. Decorative plaster work and panelling in the dining room was carried out by H.H. Martyn & Co.

== Loss ==
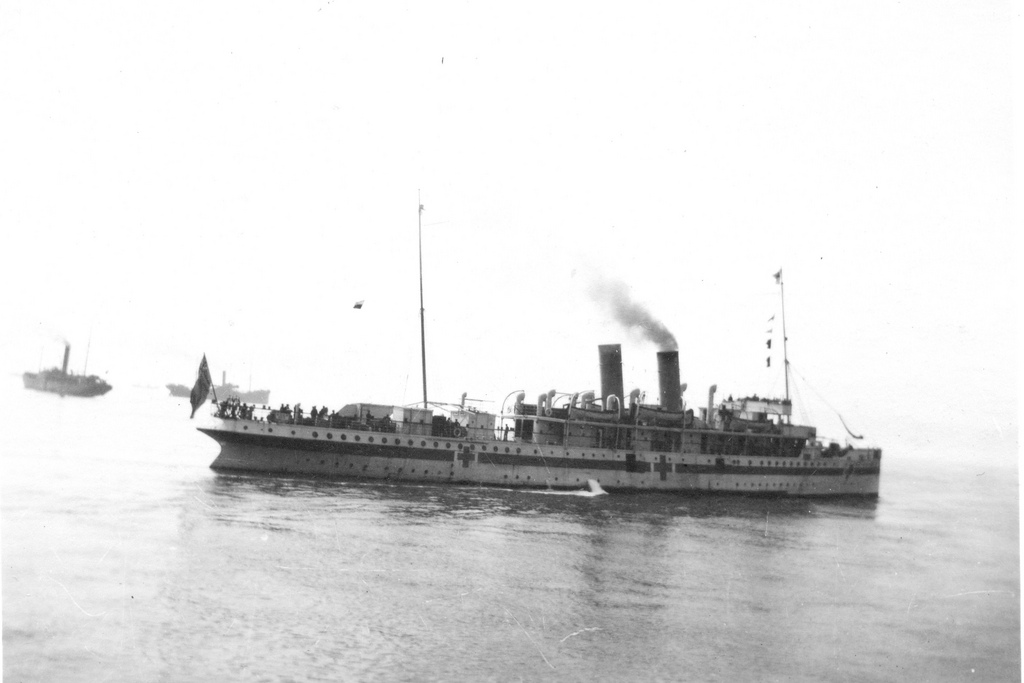
HMHS Dieppe treated over 100 of Maloja's survivors

At 1500 hrs Saturday 26 February 1916 Maloja sailed from Tilbury for Bombay carrying 122 passengers (less than a fifth of her capacity) and a general cargo. Her passengers were a mixture of military and government personnel, and civilians including women and children. Following normal P&O practice, her complement of 301 comprised British officers and Lascar crew.

On the morning of Sunday 27 February Maloja approached the Strait of Dover at full speed and overtook a Canadian collier, Empress of Fort William. Under wartime conditions each ship would have to be examined by a patrol boat before being allowed to proceed.

The German Type UC I submarine SM UC-6 had recently mined the strait. At about 1030 hrs Maloja was about 2 nautical miles (3.7 km) off Dover when her starboard quarter struck one of UC-6's mines. There was a large explosion, and the bulkheads of the second saloon were blown in. Empress of Fort William was still in sight and immediately went full ahead to assist, but while still 1 nautical mile (1.9 km) astern the collier also struck one of UC-6's mines and began to sink.

As a precaution against enemy attack, Maloja was steaming with her lifeboats already swung out on their davits so that they could be lowered more quickly. Her Master, Captain C.D. Irving, RNR, immediately had her engines stopped and then put astern to stop her so that her boats could be lowered. She also sounded her whistle as a signal to prepare to abandon ship.

Irving then tried to order her engines be stopped again for the ship to be evacuated, but flooding in her engine room prevented the engines from being stopped and she started to make way astern at about 8 to 9 knots (15 to 17 km/h). She also developed a list to starboard which steepened to 75 degrees. Passengers started to board the starboard lifeboats but the ship's speed and list prevented all but three or four of them from being launched.

Small vessels headed to assist her including the Port of Dover tugs Lady Brassey and Lady Crundall, trawlers, dredgers and a destroyer. As Maloja steamed astern and unable to stop, the rescue vessels were unable to get alongside to take off survivors. A heavy sea was running and the hundreds who crowded her decks could only don a cork lifejacket, jump overboard and try to swim clear. A number of her rafts either were launched or floated clear, and some of her survivors managed to board them. Maloja sank 24 minutes after being mined, followed by Empress of Fort William which sank about 40 minutes after being mined.

Many of the deaths were from hypothermia, either in the water or after being rescued. Most of the people who survived were recovered from the water. Several survivors, including Captain Irving, had been immersed for half an hour. The Second Officer, Lieutenant C Vincent, was in the water for an hour but survived. The small vessels taking part in the rescue took many of the survivors to the hospital ships Dieppe and St David. Others were brought ashore and Royal Navy ambulances took them to the Lord Warden Hotel. Survivors were later taken by special train to London Victoria.

At about 1130 hrs vessels started to bring bodies ashore. The chief constable of Kent took charge of the dead and designated the Market Hall below Dover Museum as a temporary mortuary. 45 bodies were recovered but about another 100 people were unaccounted for.

== Monuments ==
Approximate position of Maloja's wreck off the coast of Kent

13 of the dead are buried in the St Mary the Virgin New Cemetery, Dover. They include three servicemen, four women, and four children aged 3, 5, 6 and 8.

The servicemen were given Commonwealth war graves. As well as the three buried at Dover, one is buried at Horsham and another at Portsmouth.Stewardess Esther Seymour is buried in Hampstead Cemetery.

Many of the 155 dead were Lascars. P&O erected a monument to 22 of them in St Mary's Cemetery.

== Replacement ship ==
In 1923 P&O replaced the ship with a new, larger RMS Maloja. She survived the Second World War and was scrapped in 1954.

== Wreck ==
Maloja's wreck lies in 80 to 100 feet (24 to 30 m) of water but was a navigation hazard, so in 1964 she was blown up. This left the wreck considerably dispersed and flattened, but what remains is substantial enough to have become a destination for wreck diving when underwater visibility is good enough.
