= Maloja, Switzerland =

Village on Maloja pass in Graubünden, Switzerland

Coordinates: 46°24′05″N 09°41′45″E

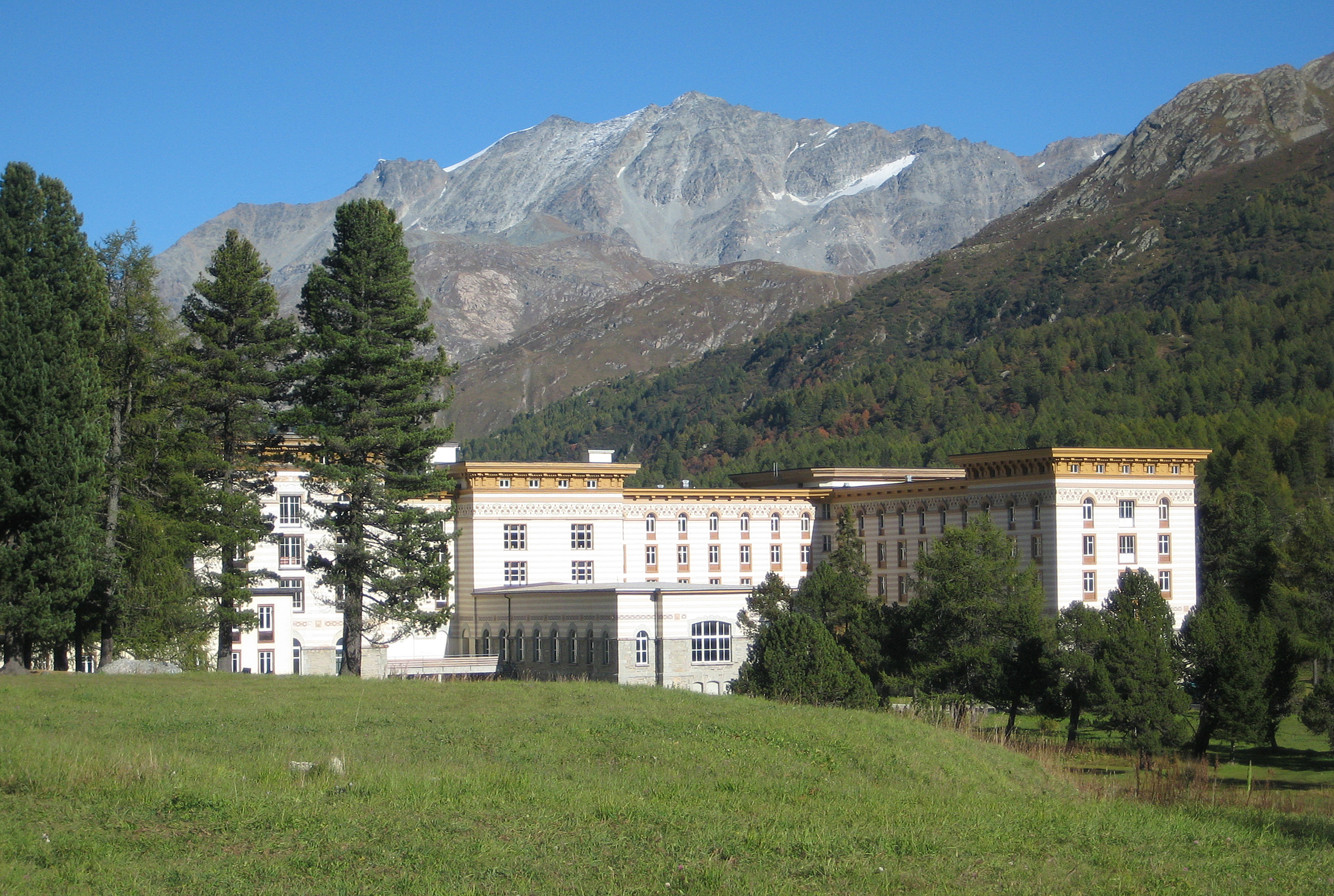
Hotel Maloja Palace

Maloja (Romansh: Malögia) is a village in the Swiss canton of Grisons. It is part of the municipality of Bregaglia.

It is located at the western end of Lake Sils, near the summit of the Maloja Pass.

Since 1884 it boasts the luxury hotel Maloja Palace.

== Bibliography ==
- Denby, Elaine (1998). Grand hotels: reality and illusion. London: Reaktion Books Ltd. ISBN 1-86189-121-0.
