= Mountain breeze and valley breeze =

Localized winds which occur in a daily cycle

In meteorology, a mountain breeze and a valley breeze are two related, localized winds that occur one after the other on a daily cycle. They are an example of anabatic and katabatic winds occurring at local scales. These winds are opposite from each other. Mountain winds blow from the mountains towards valleys after sunset, when mountains cool down and the valley zone is comparatively warmer. While valley breezes occur when the warm air rises up the sides of the valley, warm air in a mountain breeze will rise up the middle.

== Cause of mountain breeze ==
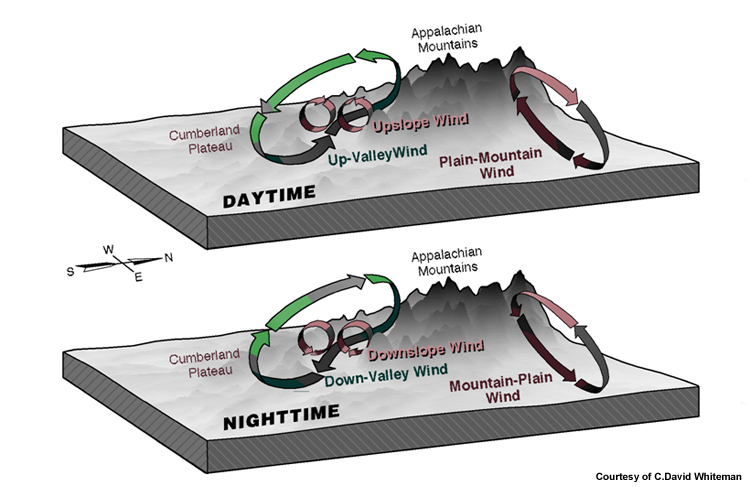
Diurnal wind system variation in the Appalachian mountain range.

Mountain and valley breezes form through a process similar to sea and land breezes. During the day, the sun heats up mountain air rapidly while the valley remains relatively cooler. This rapid heating can create a localized area of lower pressure along the slopes, causing air to flow upslope from the relatively higher pressure in the valley. This convection creates the valley breeze. At night, the process is reversed. During the night the slopes get cooled and the dense air descends into the valley as the mountain wind. These breezes occur mostly during calm and clear weather. Mountain and valley breezes are other examples of local winds caused by an area's geography. Campers in mountainous areas may feel a warm afternoon quickly change into a cold night soon after the sun sets. During the day, the sun warms the air along the mountain slopes. This warm air rises up the mountain slopes, creating a valley breeze. At nightfall, the air along the mountain slopes cools. This cool air moves down the slope into the valley, producing a mountain breeze.
