= RMS Maloja =

British ocean liner

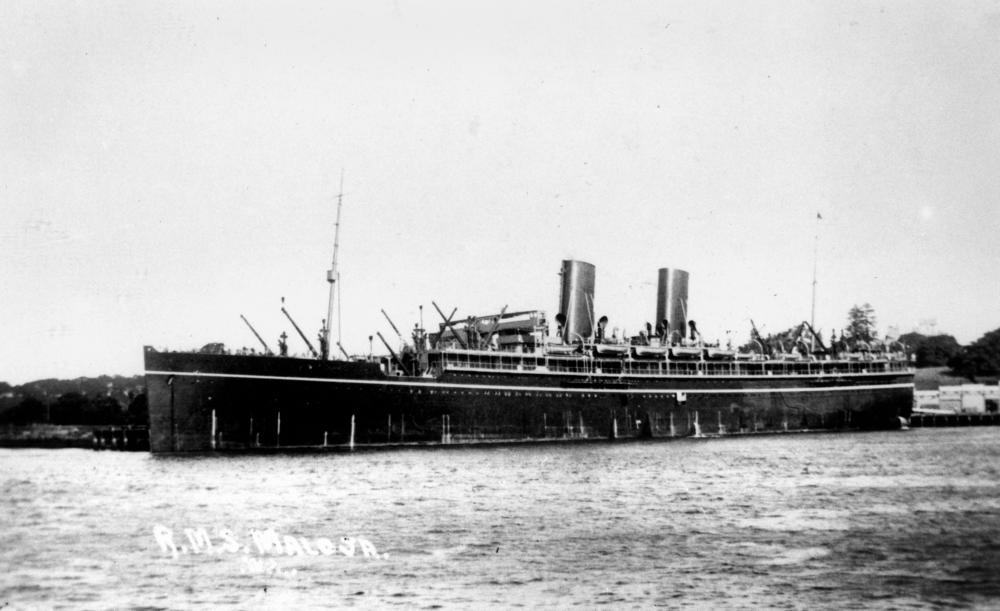

History

United Kingdom
- Name: RMS Maloja
- Owner: P&O
- Port of registry: London
- Route: London, India, China, Australia; mail and passenger service
- Ordered: 29 November 1918
- Builder: Messrs Harland & Wolff, Belfast
- Yard number: 588
- Launched: 19 April 1923
- Completed: 25 October 1923
- Maiden voyage: 2 November 1923
- Fate: Scrapped on 2 April 1954, Inverkeithing

General characteristics
- Type: Ocean liner
- Tonnage: 20,847 GRT; 12,836 net tonnage; 16,032 tons deadweight
- Length: 600 1/2 ft (183.0 m) pp
- Beam: 73 1/2 ft (22.4 m)
- Draught: 34 ft 10 in (10.6 m)
- Decks: 5
- Installed power: 15,300 shaft horsepower (11,400 kW)
- Propulsion: 2 quadruple-expansion steam engines, inverted direct acting; Twin screw; 6 double-ended & 2 single-ended oil-fired boilers producing steam at 215 psi (1,480 kPa)
- Speed: 16 kn (30 km/h)
- Capacity: Passengers: 327 first class; 329 second class
- Crew: 423: 10 officers; 94 seamen; 22 engineers; 82 firemen; 215 saloon crew
- Notes: Black hull with white line, red boot-topping, upper works stone, funnels black.

RMS Maloja was a British ocean liner that saw service from 1923 to 1954.

P&O ordered two sister ships, RMS Maloja and RMS Mooltan, from Harland & Wolff on 29 November 1918. Hull number 588 was named Maloja, after a previous SS Maloja that was a 1911 M-class liner that had been sunk by a German mine in 1916. The interior design was in keeping with the high standards of the Line. The public rooms were luxurious, completely decorated and lofty. All first and second class cabins had portholes. The dining saloon seated 330; it was panelled in a neo-Georgian style, finished throughout in ivory white, with the doors and architraves in polished mahogany. The reading and music saloon was in the style of Louis XVI with large French windows. RMS Maloja was launched by Hon. Elsie Mackay, daughter of the company's chairman James Mackay, 1st Earl of Inchcape, on 19 April 1923. Maloja and Mooltan eventually earned a reputation for comfort and reliability. Maloja was delivered on 25 October 1923. The two sister ships were the largest that could comfortably pass through the Suez Canal at that time.

== Maiden voyage ==
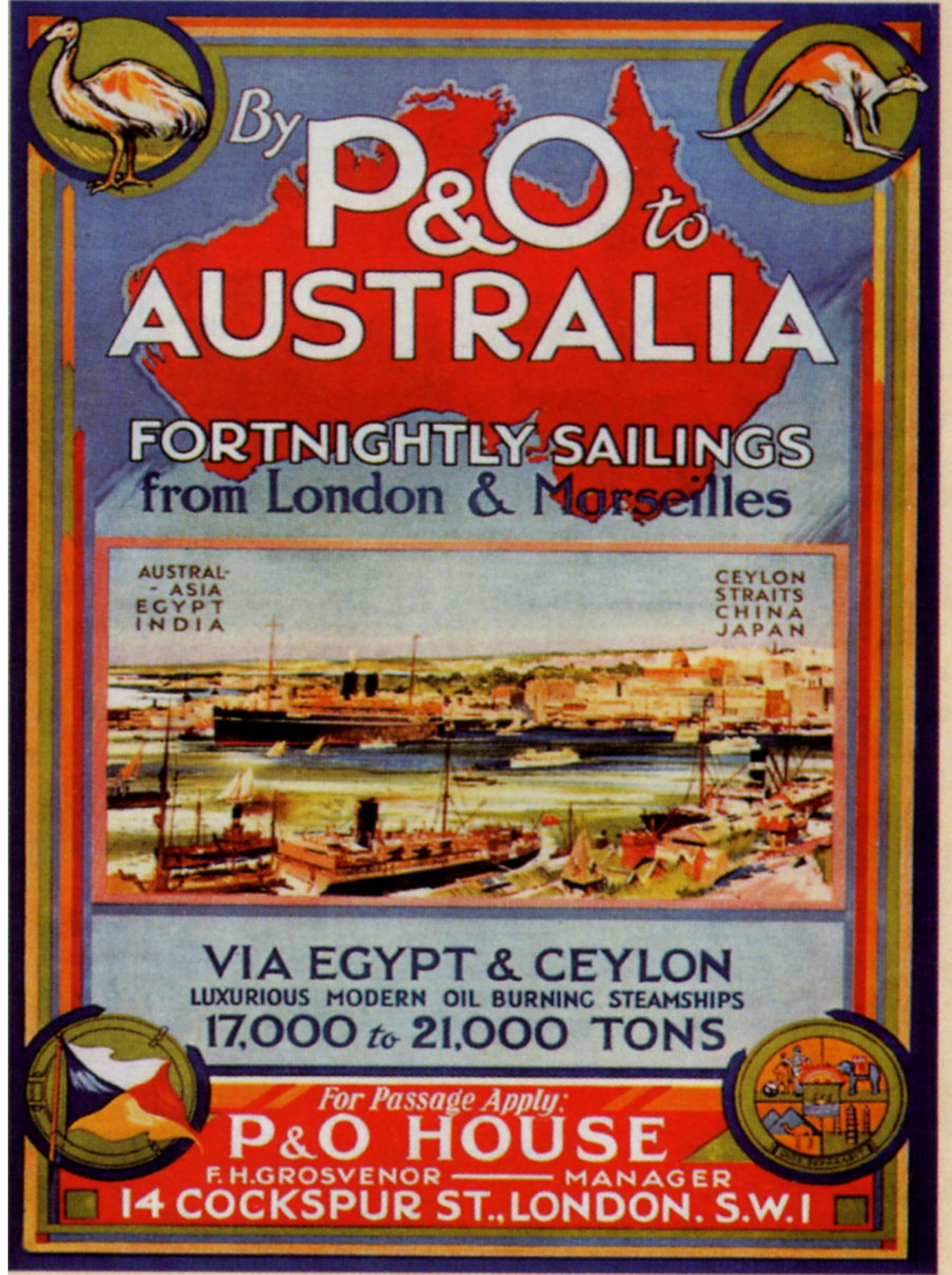
A P&O poster of the era

On 2 November 1923 RMS Maloja began her maiden voyage. Her design had prioritised reliability and comfort over speed. She had broad decks and rode steadily, although (because of a small rudder) she would prove difficult to handle. On 18 January 1924 the two ships began running the fortnightly service between Tilbury and Sydney via Colombo and Melbourne. In November 1923 Maloja was caught in a dockworkers' strike in Australia and after a delayed departure was forced to abandon 6,000 tons of cargo left on the dockside. In March 1933 Maloja ran aground in Adelaide but was re-floated without sustaining significant damage. In January 1933 Maloja was in Gibraltar Bay, loading cargo from a lighter in severe weather. An anchor and 45 fathoms (270 ft; 82 m) of chain pulled free and were lost.

== Wartime requisition ==
On 11 September 1939 Maloja was requisitioned by the Admiralty and converted to an armed merchant cruiser in Bombay, India. The conversion included having one funnel removed, to increase her anti-aircraft guns' arc of fire. After the conversion she joined the Northern Patrol as HMS Maloja (F26). The Northern Patrol covered the area between Shetland and Iceland. On 13 March 1940 Maloja intercepted a ship southeast of Iceland in position 63.00N, 10.20W, which claimed to be the Japanese vessel Taki Maru. Maloja's captain suspected otherwise, but he was unable to send a boarding party due to the adverse weather conditions. As the weather cleared it became clear that the unknown vessel was the German La Coruña of the Hamburg-South America Line. The German crew scuttled her to evade capture, and after they had abandoned ship and been picked out of the water by the British crew, Maloja turned her guns on the German ship and hastened its sinking.

On 6 November 1941 Maloja was returned to P&O and was converted to troopship duty. A shorter version of the funnel was re-installed.

Described by one passenger, as "very crowded" (with troops) she sailed from Liverpool on 28 July 1942 for Calcutta, but heading first for Greenock on the Firth of Clyde (arriving 29 July) to join the rest of the convoy, which included seven battleships and destroyers. The convoy left the Clyde on 30 July. On Monday, 10 August the Maloja anchored at Freetown, Sierra Leone until 15 August. While at Freetown the convoy was joined by two battleships, and a further three US ships joined on 18 August. She put in at Cape Town on 27 August and left on the 30th. She arrived in Calcutta on 19 September 1942.

In December 1942, some weeks after Operation Torch, she took Allied troops to North Africa. According to the records of No.255 Squadron, RAF, the vessel sailed from Liverpool at 13:00 on 27 November 1942.

The voyage was uneventful, encountering no enemy action of any kind and little by way of rough weather. The Maloja anchored off Algiers early on 6 December but disembarkation there was cancelled and the vessel proceeded eastwards towards Bône, arriving at 11:00 hours the next day.

== Peacetime and the return to commercial service ==
On 15 January 1947 Maloja was returned to P&O and was berthed at the Royal Albert Dock in London for full civilian reconditioning, by R & H Green & Silley Weir. Both Maloja and Mooltan were returned to service. After the independence of the Republic of Indonesia in 1948 Dutch civilians were repatriated to the Netherlands. In August 1950 Maloja helped with the repatriations, which were completed by 1951. On 19 January 1954 Maloja arrived at Tilbury, London, on her last voyage.

== Fate ==
On 2 April 1954 she was moved to Inverkeithing, Scotland, where she was broken up for scrap. British Iron & Steel Corporation paid £165,000 for her; the scrap work was performed by Thos. W. Ward.

== Bibliography ==
- Osborne, Richard; Spong, Harry; Grover, Tom (2007). Armed Merchant Cruisers 1878–1945. Windsor, UK: World Warship Society. ISBN 978-0-9543310-8-5.
