= Anabatic wind =

Warm wind that blows up a steep slope

An anabatic wind, from the Greek anabatos, verbal noun of anabainein meaning "moving upward", is a warm wind which blows up a steep slope or mountain side, driven by heating of the slope through insolation. It is also known as upslope flow. These winds typically occur during the daytime in calm sunny weather. A hill or mountain top will be radiatively warmed by the Sun which in turn heats the air just above it. Air at a similar altitude over an adjacent valley or plain does not get warmed so much because of the greater distance to the ground below it.

The air over the hill top is now warmer than the air at a similar altitude around it and will rise through convection. This creates a lower pressure region into which the air at the bottom of the slope flows, causing the wind. It is common for the air rising from the tops of large mountains to reach a height where it cools adiabatically to below its dew point and forms cumulus clouds. These can then produce rain or even thunderstorms.

If solar heating is weakened or becomes spatially uneven (e.g., during cloud passage), the resulting change in the thermal contrast between the slope and the adjacent valley can affect the strength and vertical structure of the upslope wind and may also modify the associated along-valley flow component.

Anabatic winds are particularly useful to soaring glider pilots who can use them to increase the aircraft's altitude. Anabatic winds can be detrimental to the maximum downhill speed of cyclists. Conversely, katabatic winds are down-slope winds, frequently produced at night by the opposite effect, the air near to the ground losing heat to it faster than air at a similar altitude over adjacent low-lying land.

== See also ==
- Katabatic wind
- Mountain breeze and valley breeze
