= Maloja Pass =

High alpine pass in Swiss canton of Graubünden

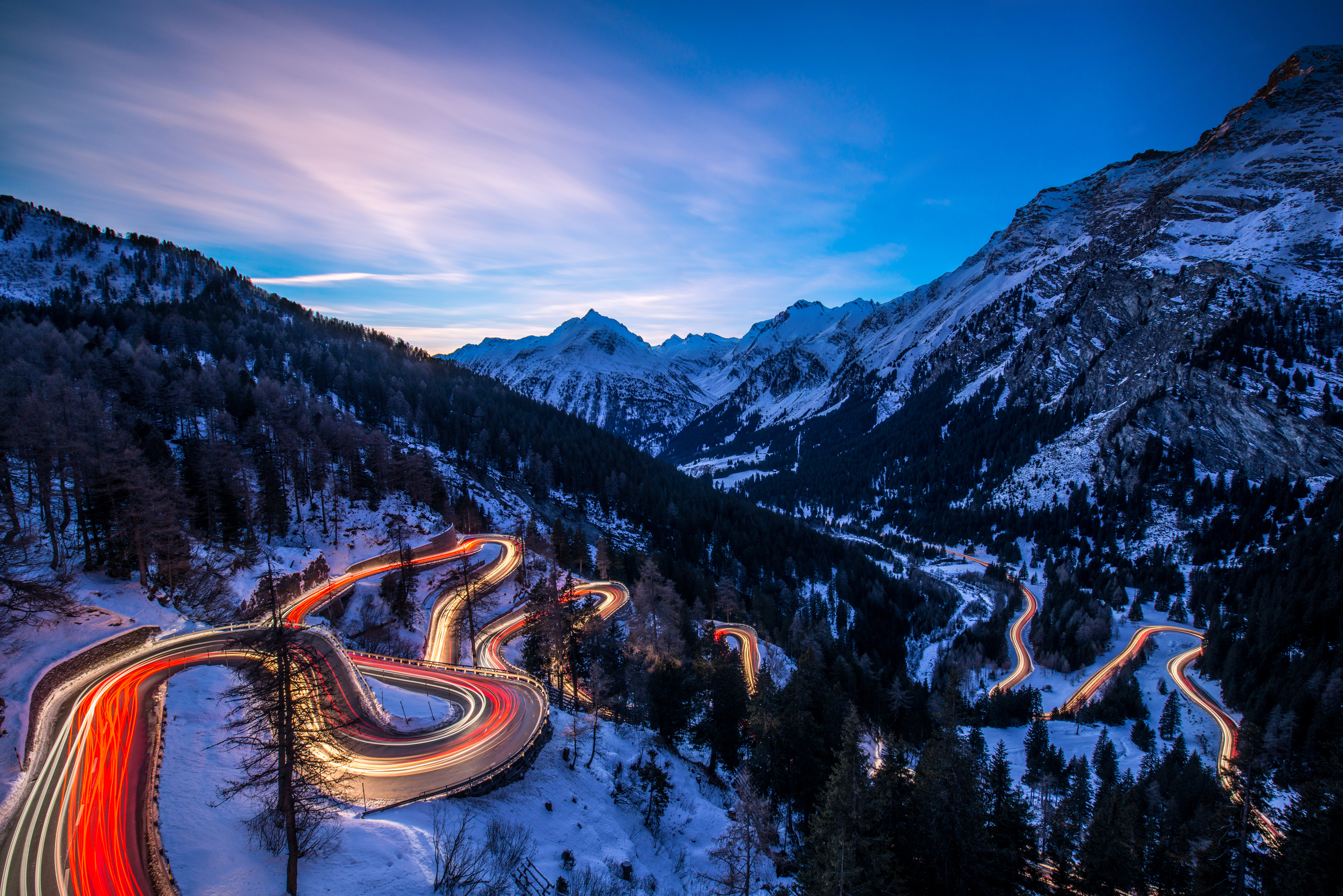
- Maloja Pass road

- Location within Switzerland
- Elevation: 1,815 metres (5,955 ft)
- Traversed by: Road

Third Approach
- Location: Graubünden, Switzerland
- Range: Alps
- Coordinates: 46°24′N 09°42′E

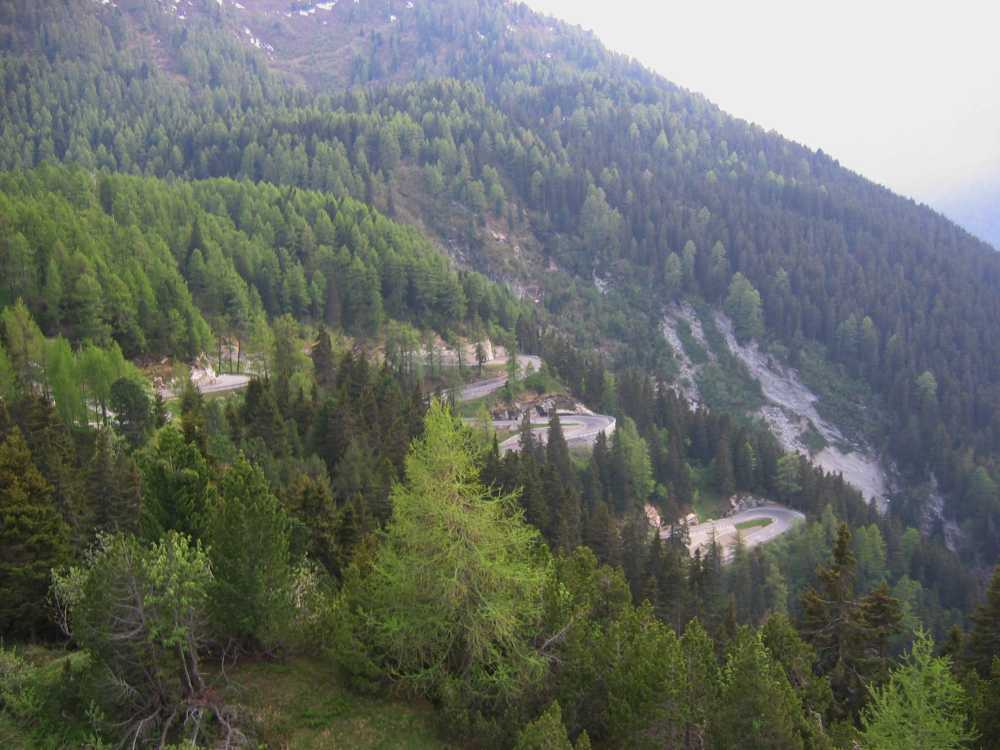
Maloja Pass road

Maloja Pass (Italian: Passo del Maloja, German: Malojapass) (1815m a.s.l.) is a high mountain pass in the Swiss Alps in the canton of Graubünden, linking the Engadine with the Val Bregaglia, still in Switzerland and Chiavenna in Italy. It marks the divide between the Inn and Po watersheds. Lägh da Bitabergh is near the pass.

The road from Chiavenna to Silvaplana with distances and elevation:

- 0 km Chiavenna 333 m
- 10 km Castasegna (Italian-Swiss border) 696 m
- 13 km Promontogno 802 m
- 16 km Stampa 994 m
- 18 km Borgonovo 1029 m
- 19 km Vicosoprano 1065 m
- 27 km Casaccia 1458 m
- 32 km Maloja Pass 1815 m
- 33 km Maloja 1809 m
- 40 km Sils im Engadin/Segl 1798 m
- 44 km Silvaplana 1802 m

The Maloja Pass is open in winter. After heavy snowfalls the road may be closed for a couple of hours or for an entire day. Even if open, the road might be covered with snow making snow/winter tires, or Snow chains, a necessity.

The lowest point of the col, and the lowest point on the watershed between the basins of the Inn and the Po in Switzerland lies at an altitude of 1,812 m.

== Expansion plan ==
In October 2025, the Graubünden government has presented a comprehensive expansion plan to upgrade the Maloja Pass road. At a cost of CHF 316 million, the road will be partially widened and a tunnel built. The Maloja Pass is the most important access route from Italy to the Upper Engadine.

The road will be widened in places, and a cycle path will be added. The largest part of the project will be a 2.7-kilometre-long tunnel costing CHF 280 million.

The stretch between Sils Föglias and Plaun de Lej – where the tunnel will be built – often has to be closed due to the risk of rockfalls and avalanches. Politicians have been wanting to remedy these two weak points for decades.

== See also ==
- Engadine Line, a geological structure
- List of highest paved roads in Switzerland (roads above 1,850 m)
- List of highest road passes in Switzerland
- List of mountain passes in Switzerland
- Maloja Wind
