= Piz Bacun =

Mountain in Switzerland

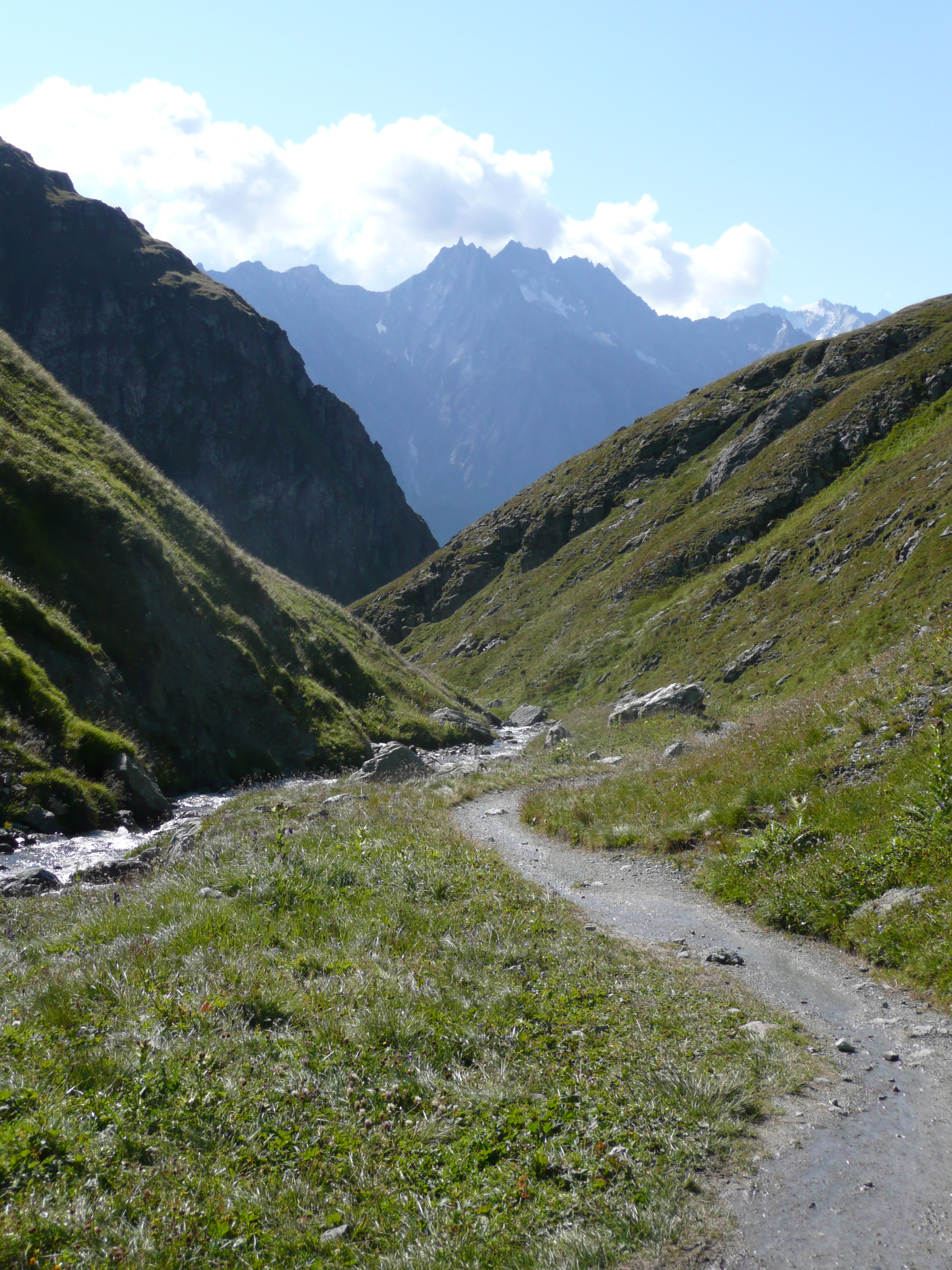
- Piz Bacun as seen from Septimer Pass

Highest point
- Elevation: 3,244 m (10,643 ft)
- Prominence: 306 m (1,004 ft)
- Parent peak: Monte Disgrazia
- Listing: Alpine mountains above 3000 m
- Coordinates: 46°20′31.6″N 9°40′55.8″E

Geography
- Location within Switzerland
- Location: Graubünden, Switzerland
- Parent range: Bregaglia Range

Climbing
- First ascent: 27 August 1883 by Theodor Curtius and L. Bernus, guided by Christian Klucker and Johann Eggenberger

Piz Bacun is a mountain of the Bregaglia Range (Alps), overlooking Vicosoprano in the Swiss canton of Graubünden. It is located between the Lake Albigna and the Forno Glacier.
