= Ago di Sciora =

Mountain in Switzerland

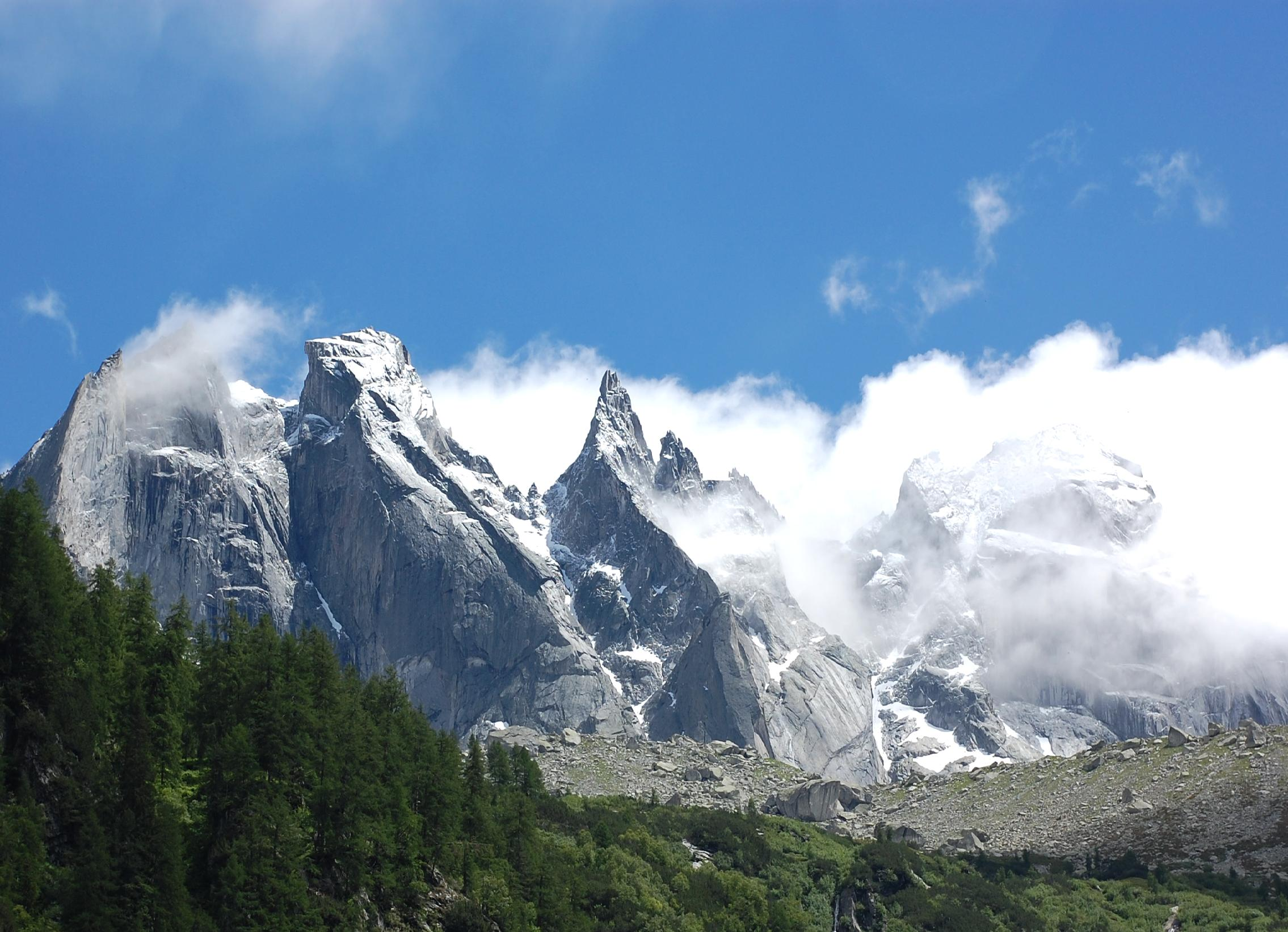
- Ago di Sciora (centre) in the Sciora group. The left peak is Punta Pioda

Highest point
- Elevation: 3,205 m (10,515 ft)
- Prominence: 105 m (344 ft)
- Parent peak: Piz Cengalo
- Coordinates: 46°18′06″N 9°37′33″E

Geography
- Location within Switzerland
- Location: Graubünden, Switzerland
- Parent range: Bregaglia Range

Climbing
- First ascent: 4 June 1893 by Anton von Rydzewski, Christian Klucker and Emile Rey

Ago di Sciora is a mountain in the Bregaglia Range of the Alps, located south of Vicosoprano in the canton of Graubünden. It forms a sharp needle in the middle of the Sciora group.
