= Cima dal Cantun =

Mountain in Switzerland

- Location within Switzerland

Highest point
- Elevation: 3,354 m (11,004 ft)
- Prominence: 93 m (305 ft)
- Parent peak: Cima di Castello
- Coordinates: 46°18′38.3″N 9°40′43.2″E

Geography
- Location: Graubünden, Switzerland
- Parent range: Bregaglia Range

Cima dal Cantun is a mountain of the Bregaglia Range (Alps), located between the valleys of the Albigna and the Forno Glacier in Graubünden.
