= Monte Sissone =

Mountain in Switzerland

- Location within Alps

Highest point
- Elevation: 3,330 m (10,930 ft)
- Prominence: 180 m (590 ft)
- Parent peak: Cima di Rosso
- Coordinates: 46°17′34″N 9°45′52″E

Geography
- Location: Graubünden, Switzerland; Lombardy, Italy
- Parent range: Bregaglia Range

Monte Sissone (3,330 m) is a mountain in the Bregaglia Range of the Alps, located on the border between Italy and Switzerland. Its summit is the tripoint between the Val Bregaglia (in Graubünden), Val Masino and Val Malenco (both in Lombardy) On its northern side, the mountain overlooks the Forno Glacier.
