= Punta Pioda =

Mountain in Switzerland

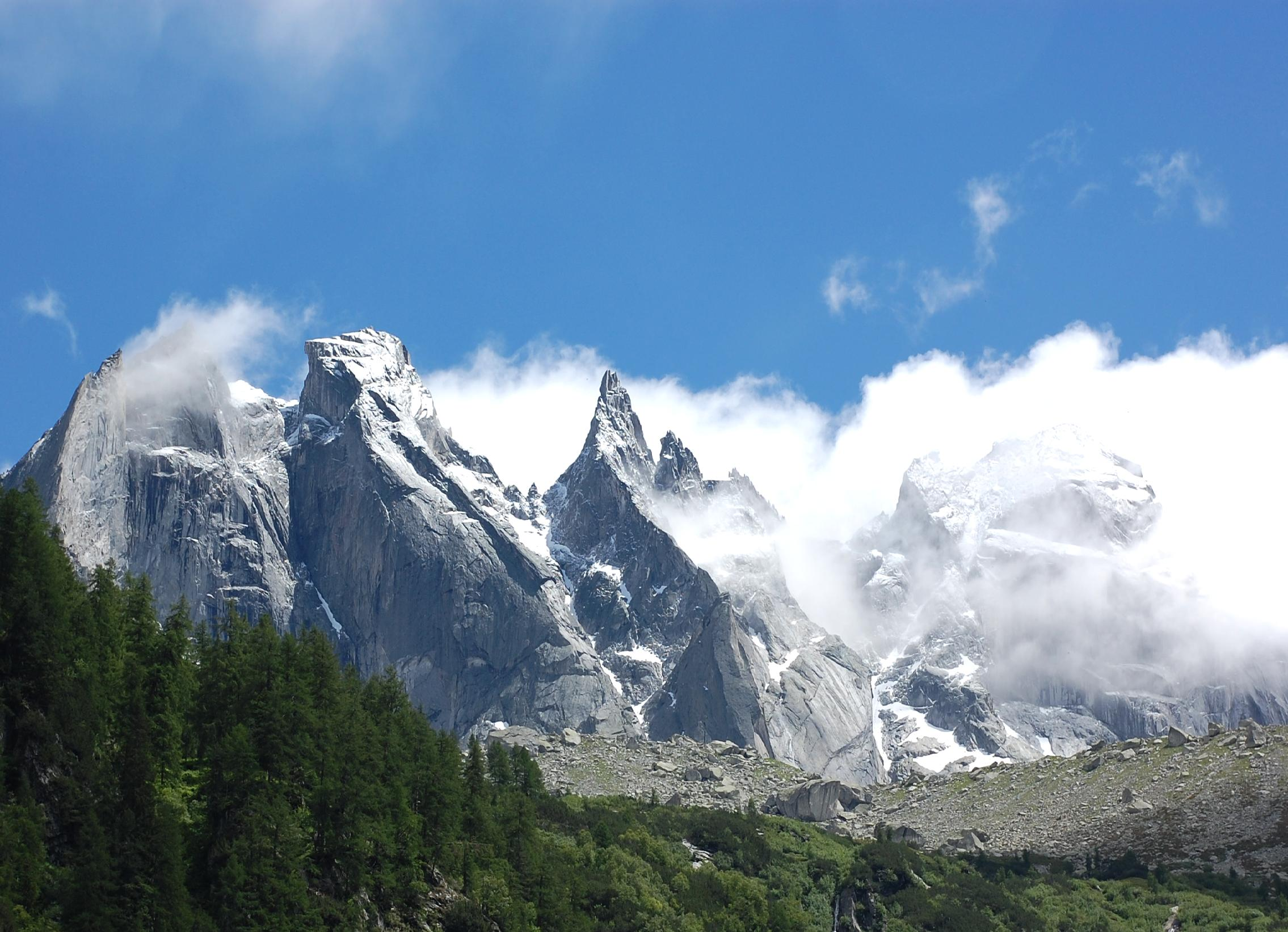
- Punta Pioda (centre left) and Ago di Sciora (centre)

Highest point
- Elevation: 3,238 m (10,623 ft)
- Prominence: 148 m (486 ft)
- Parent peak: Piz Cengalo
- Coordinates: 46°18′11.45″N 9°37′39.18″E

Geography
- Location within Switzerland
- Location: Graubünden, Switzerland
- Parent range: Bregaglia Range

Climbing
- First ascent: 12 July 1891 by Anton von Rydzewski, Christian Klucker and Mansueto Barbaria

The Punta Pioda (or Pioda di Sciora) is a 3,238 m (10,623 ft) mountain in the Bregaglia Range of the Alps, located south of Vicosoprano in the canton of Graubünden. It lies in the Sciora group.
