= Piz Cacciabella =

Mountain in Switzerland

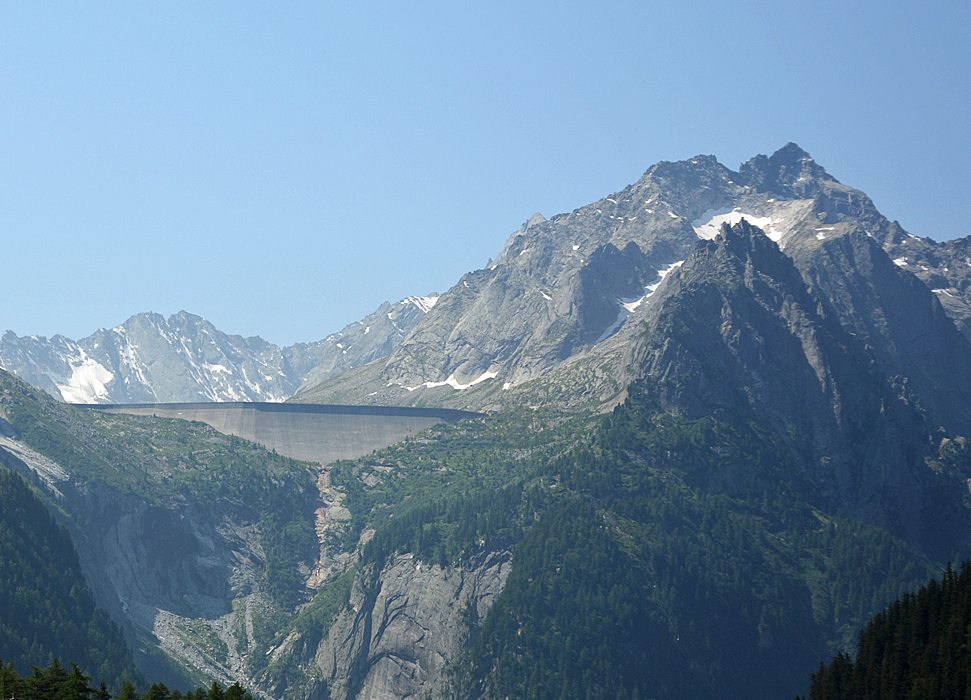
- Piz Cacciabella (right)

Highest point
- Elevation: 2,980 m (9,780 ft)
- Prominence: 120 m (390 ft)
- Parent peak: Piz Cengalo
- Coordinates: 46°19′26.5″N 9°37′44.5″E

Geography
- Location within Switzerland
- Location: Graubünden, Switzerland
- Parent range: Bregaglia Range

Piz Cacciabella (2,980 m) is a mountain in the Bregaglia Range of the Alps, overlooking Vicosoprano in the canton of Graubünden. It is the northernmost summit of the range between the valleys of Bondasca and Albigna.
