= Sciora Dafora =

Mountain in Switzerland

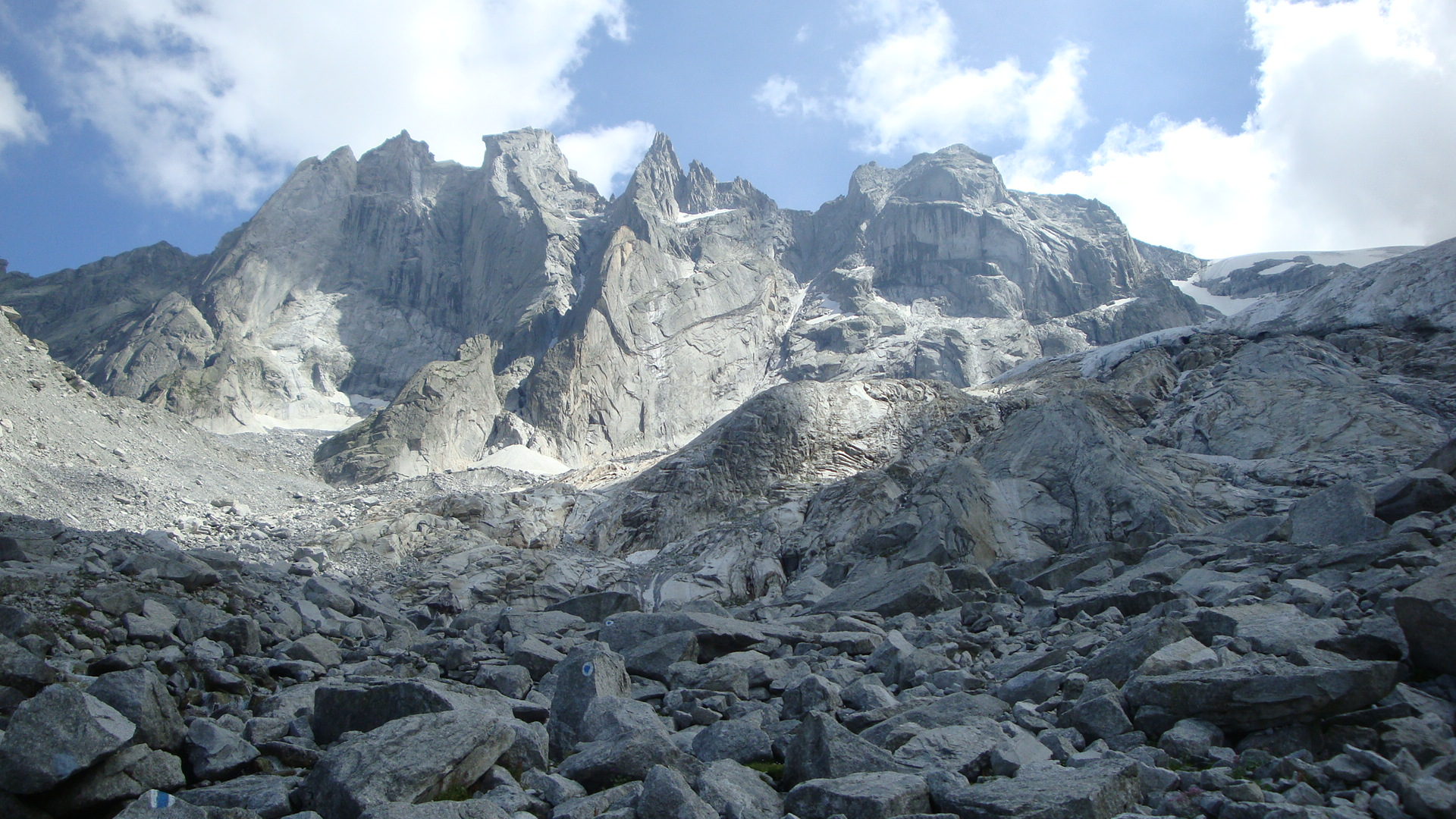
- The Sciora group, from left to right: Sciora Dafora, Punta Pioda, Ago di Sciora (the needle), Sciora Dadent

Highest point
- Elevation: 3,169 m (10,397 ft)
- Coordinates: 46°18′19.35″N 9°37′39.91″E

Geography
- Location within Switzerland
- Location: Graubünden, Switzerland
- Parent range: Bregaglia Range

Climbing
- First ascent: 6 July 1892 by Anton von Rydzewski, Christian Klucker and Mansueto Barbaria

The Sciora Dafora (or Sciora di Fuori) is a mountain in the Bregaglia Range of the Alps, located south of Vicosoprano in the canton of Graubünden. It is the northernmost summit of the Sciora group.
