= Monte del Forno =

Mountain in Switzerland

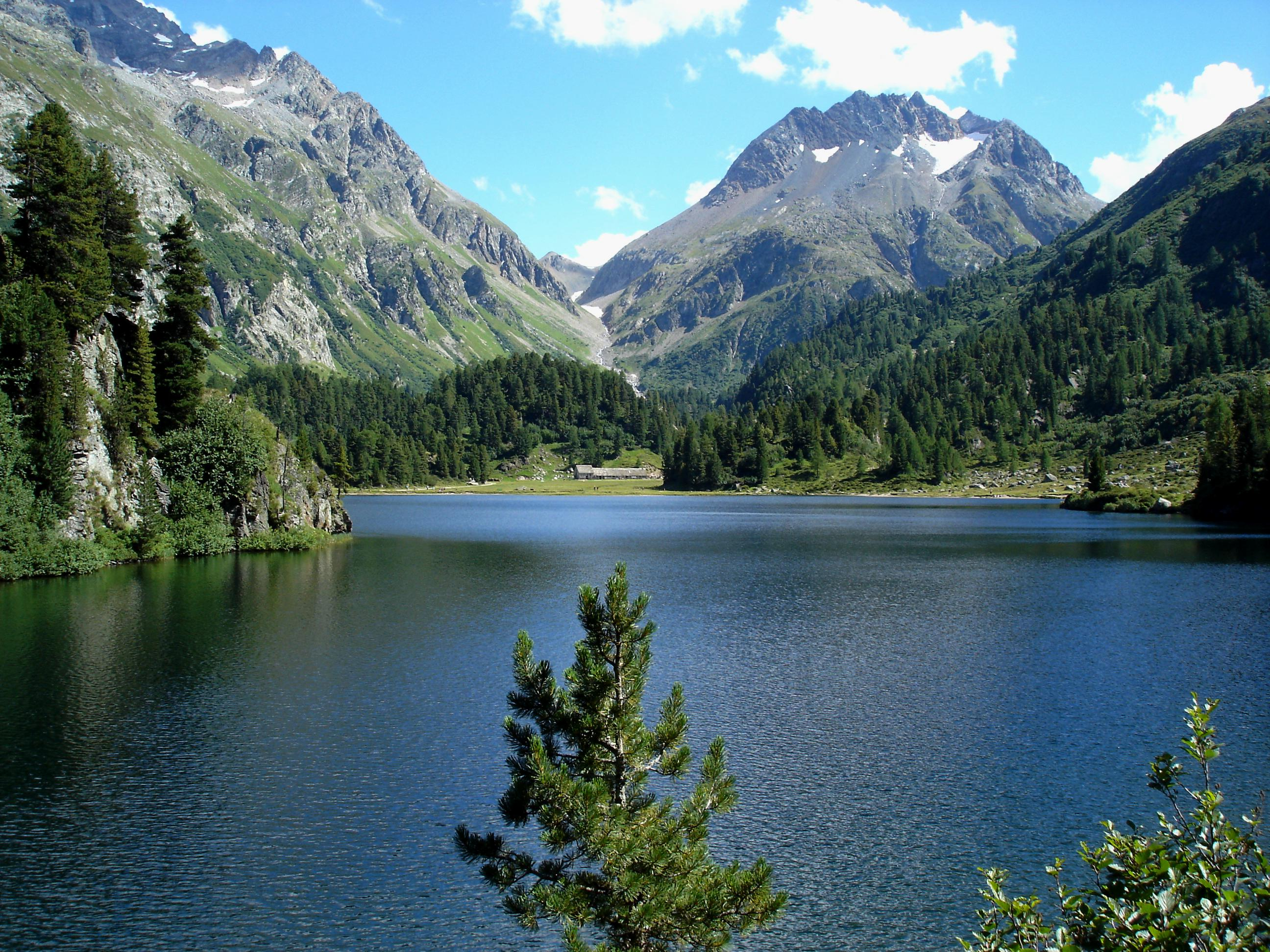
- Monte del Forno (centre-right) from the north side

Highest point
- Elevation: 3,214 m (10,545 ft)
- Prominence: 446 m (1,463 ft)
- Parent peak: Monte Disgrazia
- Listing: Alpine mountains above 3000 m
- Coordinates: 46°20′18″N 9°43′29″E

Geography
- Location within Alps
- Location: Graubünden, Switzerland / Lombardy, Italy
- Parent range: Bregaglia Range

Monte del Forno is a mountain in the Bregaglia Range (Alps), located on the border between Italy and Switzerland. On its western side it overlooks the Forno Glacier.
