= Sciora Dadent =

Mountain in Switzerland

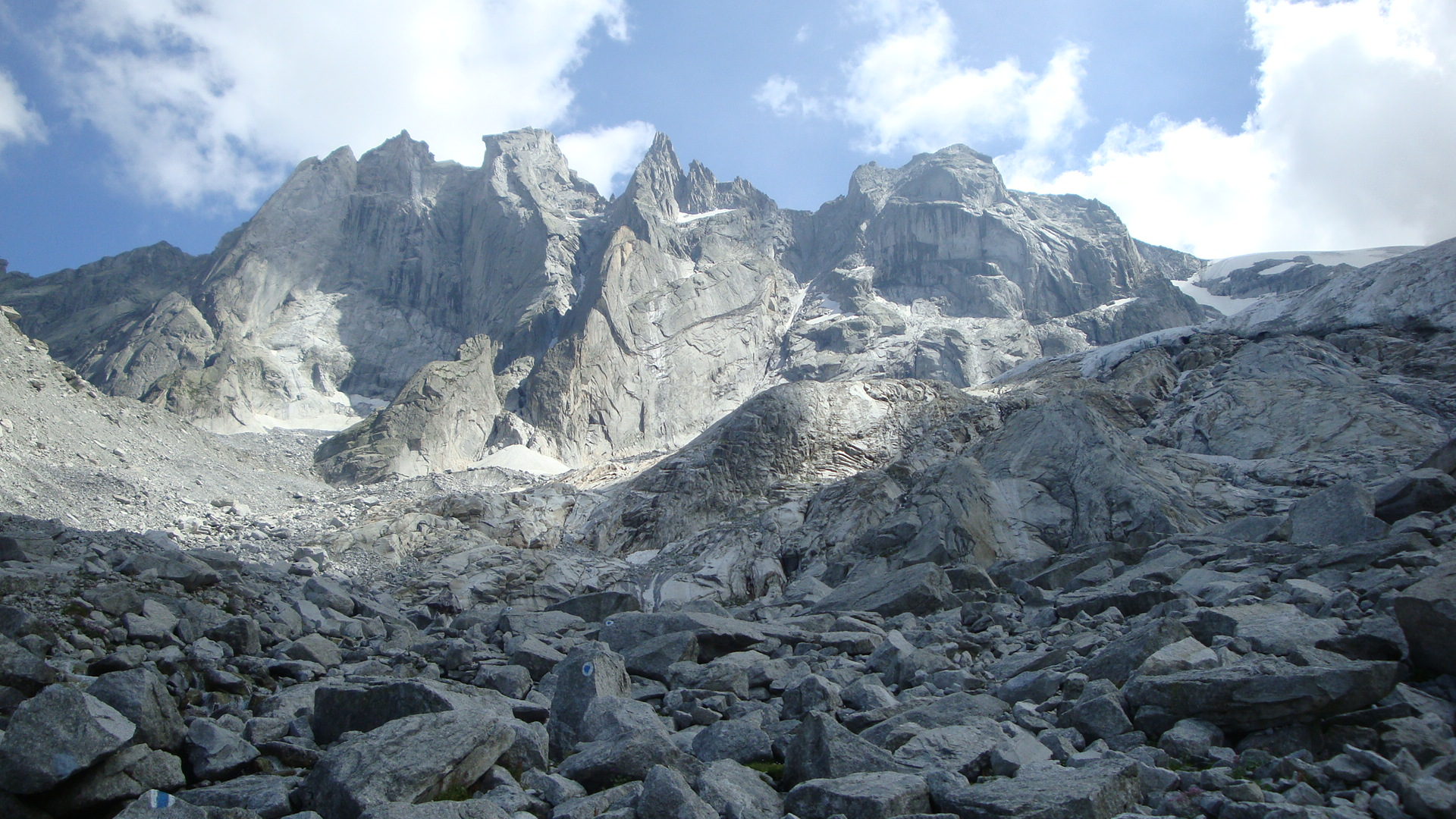
- Sciora Dadent (right) and the Sciora massif

Highest point
- Elevation: 3,275 m (10,745 ft)
- Prominence: 120 m (390 ft)
- Parent peak: Cima della Bondasca
- Coordinates: 46°17′50.4″N 9°37′28.8″E

Geography
- Location within Switzerland
- Location: Graubünden, Switzerland
- Parent range: Bregaglia Range

The Sciora Dadent (or Sciora di Dentro) (3,275 m) is a mountain in the Bregaglia Range of the Alps, located south of Vicosoprano in the canton of Graubünden. It is the highest and southernmost summit of the Sciora group.
