= Pioda =

Pioda may refer to:

- Giovanni Battista Pioda, Swiss politician
- Punta Pioda, mountain in the Bregaglia Range of the Alps

== See also ==
- Piode
