= List of glaciers in Switzerland =

Overview of glaciers in Switzerland

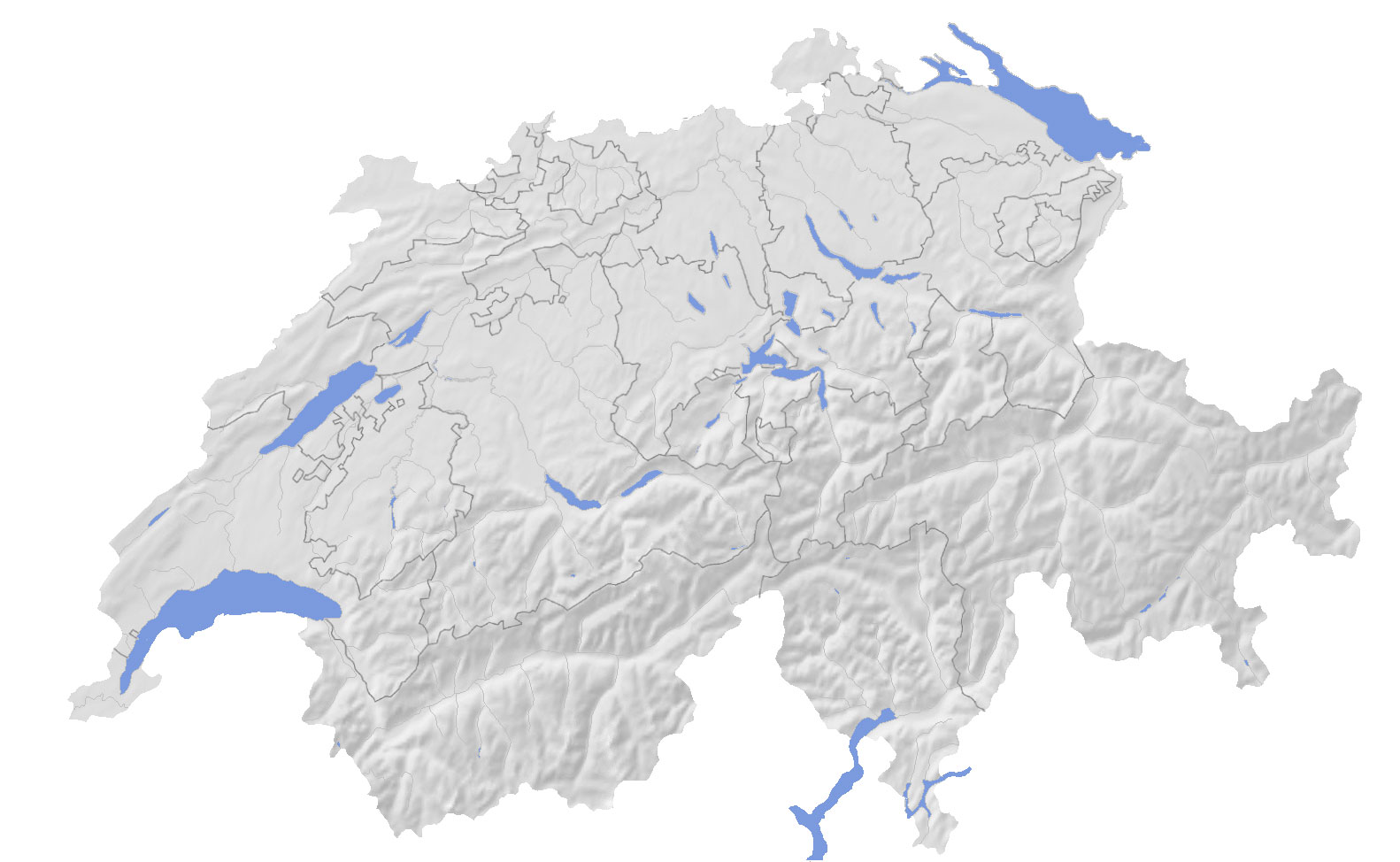

This is a non-exhaustive list of the major glaciers in Switzerland. It contains their surface area, their lengths since the start of measurement and the most current year, their height and their outflow. Most of them are retreating and many will vanish.

All of these glaciers are located within the Swiss Alps. Most of them are situated in the Pennine and Bernese Alps. The Jungfrau-Aletsch protected area includes the largest glaciers of the Alps.

There are glaciers in the four major drainage basins of Switzerland. The Rhine and Rhône basins are located on the northern side of the Alps while the Po basin is located on the south side of the Alps. The Danube basin is located on the east side of the Alps. There are no glaciers in the Swiss portion of the Adige basin.

There are approximately 1,800 glaciers in the Swiss Alps.

== List ==
Name	Canton	Range	Area 1973 (km²)	Start of measurement (year)	Max length (km)	1973 length (km)	2016 length (km)	Length change (m)	Highest point in drainage basin	Altitude (m)	Front alt. (m)	Outflow	Basin
Grand Aletsch	VS	Bernese Alps	86.63	1870	25.6	23.95	22.47	-3132	Aletschhorn	4,193	1,600	Massa	Rhône
Gorner	VS	Pennine Alps	59.37	1882	14.99	13.50	12.32	-2672	Dufourspitze (Monte Rosa)	4,634	2,140	Gornera	Rhône
Fiesch	VS	Bernese Alps	34.21	1891	15.92	15.35	14.51	-1405	Finsteraarhorn	4,273	1,700	Wysswasser	Rhône
Unteraar	BE	Bernese Alps	29.48	1876	14.41	12.95	11.85	-2561	Finsteraarhorn	4,274	1,960	Aare	Rhine
Lower Grindelwald	BE	Bernese Alps	20.84	1879	9.46	8.30	5.95	-3504	Mönch	4,107	1,300	Weisse Lütschine	Rhine
Upper Aletsch	VS	Bernese Alps	22.81	1870	10.28	9.05	8.82	-1461	Aletschhorn	4193	2,140	Massa	Rhône
Corbassière	VS	Pennine Alps	18.31	1889	10.64	10.15	9.47	-1168	Grand Combin	4,314	2,200	Dyure de Corbassière	Rhône
Rhone	VS	Urner Alps	17.60	1879	9.09	8.00	7.65	-1439	Dammastock	3,630	2,200	Rhône	Rhône
Otemma	VS	Pennine Alps	17.51	1881	9.51	8.70	7.22	-2291	Pigne d'Arolla	3,790	2,450	Dranse de Bagnes	Rhône
Findel	VS	Pennine Alps	17.36	1885	9.24	7.80	6.63	-2618	Rimpfischhorn	4,199	2,500	Findelbach	Rhône
Gauli	BE	Bernese Alps	17.70	1958	6.71	6.55	5.4	-1306	Bärglistock	3,656	2,150	Gaulisee/Ürbachwasser	Rhine
Morteratsch	GR	Bernina Range	16.40	1878	8.63	7.00	5.85	-2784	Piz Bernina	4049	2,040	Ova da Morteratsch	Danube
Trift	BE	Urner Alps	16.55	1861	7.6	5.75	3.66	-3938	West of Eggstock	3,485	1,660	Triftwasser	Rhine
Zmutt	VS	Pennine Alps	16.89	1892	7.49	6.70	6.3	-1182	Matterhorn	4,478	2,240	Zmuttbach	Rhône
Zinal	VS	Pennine Alps	15.42	1891	8.6	7.50	6.9	-1700	Dent Blanche	4,357	2,060	Navisence	Rhône
Hüfi	Uri	Glarus Alps	13.64	1882	8.04	7.10	6.74	-1300	Schärhorn	3,295	1,800	Chärstelenbach	Rhine
Arolla	VS	Pennine Alps	13.17	1856	6.23	4.80	4.34	-1893	Pigne d'Arolla	3,790	2,160	Borgne d'Arolla	Rhône
Mont Miné	VS	Pennine Alps	10.97	1956	8.48	8.35	7.71	-769	Bouquetins	3,838	1,980	Borgne de Ferpècle	Rhône
Langgletscher	VS	Bernese Alps	10.09	1888	7.23	6.90	6.45	-780	Mittaghorn	3,892	2,080	Lonza	Rhône
Brenay	VS	Pennine Alps	9.96	1881	6.32	5.95	4.92	-1399	La Ruinette	3,875	2,580	Dyure du Brenay	Rhône
Allalin	VS	Pennine Alps	9.87	1881	7.07	6.50	5.91	-1159	Rimpfischhorn	4,199	2,600	Saaser Vispa	Rhône
Ferpècle	VS	Pennine Alps	9.77	1891	7.69	6.60	6.23	-1463	Dent Blanche	4,357	2,160	Borgne de Ferpècle	Rhône
Upper Grindelwald	BE	Bernese Alps	9.52	1879	6.96	6.65	4.02	-2938	North of Schreckhorn	3,750	1,380	Schwarze Lütschine	Rhine
Rätzli / Plaine Morte	BE/VS	Bernese Alps	9.09	1925	5.92	5.20	4.87	-1048	Wildstrubel	3,244	2,470	Trüebbach, La Tièche	Rhine, Rhône
Forno	GR	Bregaglia Alps	8.72	1857	7.6	6.15	5.28	-2324	Cima di Castello	3,379	2,220	Orlegna	Po
Saleina	VS	Mont Blanc massif	8.57	1878	7.04	6.45	5.95	-1087	Aiguille d'Argentière	3,901	1,760	Reuse de Saleina	Rhône
Roseg	GR	Bernina Range	8.52	1855	6.71	4.90	2.42	-4288	Piz Roseg	3,937	2,160	Ova da Roseg	Danube
Fee Glacier	VS	Pennine Alps	7.46	1883	5.89	5.00	4.57	-1318	Dom	4,545	2,100	Feevispa	Rhône
Palü	GR	Bernina Range	6.47	1894	4.88	3.80	3.51	-1366	Piz Palü	3,901	2,580	Acqua da Palü	Po
Trient	VS	Mont Blanc massif	6.40	1879	5.29	4.90	3.96	-1328	Aiguille du Tour	3,540	1,880	Trient	Rhône
Moming	VS	Pennine Alps	6.39	1879	4.19	3.60	3.06	-1134	Weisshorn	4,506	2,500	Navisence	Rhône
Gries	VS	Lepontine Alps	6.23	1847	7.84	5.70	4.88	-2959	Blinnenhorn	3,374	2,420	Ägene	Rhône
Tschierva	GR	Bernina Range	6.20	1934	5.56	4.75	3.89	-1665	Piz Bernina	4,049	2,260	Ova da Roseg	Danube
Tschingel	BE	Bernese Alps	6.19	1893	3.87	3.65	3.52	-343	Tschingelhorn	3,562	2,160	Tschingel-Litschina	Rhine
Rosenlaui	BE	Bernese Alps	6.14	1880	5.3	5.15	5.15	-151	Mittelhorn	3,704	2,000	Rosenlauibach	Rhine
Damma	UR	Urner Alps	5.09	1921	2.85	2.35	1.32	-1525	Dammastock	3,630	2,060	Dammareuss	Rhine
Wildstrubel	VS	Bernese Alps	4.81	1917	2.83	2.65	2.29	-535	Wildstrubel	3,244	2,560	Lämmerendalu	Rhine
Tsanfleuron	VS/VD	Bernese Alps	3.81	1884	4.91	3.70	3	-1907	Oldenhorn	3,123	2,460	Le Lachon	Rhône
Albigna	GR	Bregaglia Alps	3.53	1906	4.88	3.70	3.49	-1386	Cima di Castello	3,379	2,200	Albigna	Po
Silvretta	GR	Silvretta Alps	3.35	1956	3.42	3.30	3.03	-390	Silvrettahorn	3,244	2,480	Verstanclabach	Rhine
Biferten	GL	Glarus Alps	2.81	1883	4.55	4.40	4.19	-360	Tödi	3,614	1,960	Bifertenbach	Rhine
Basòdino	TI	Lepontine Alps	2.31	1899	2.02	1.50	1.28	-733	Basòdino	3,272	2,500	Bavona	Po
Vadret Tiatscha (La Cudera)	GR	Silvretta Alps	2.07	1850	3.44	2.05	1.64	-1792	East of Verstanclahorn	3,220	2,680	Lavinuoz	Danube

== Climate change ==
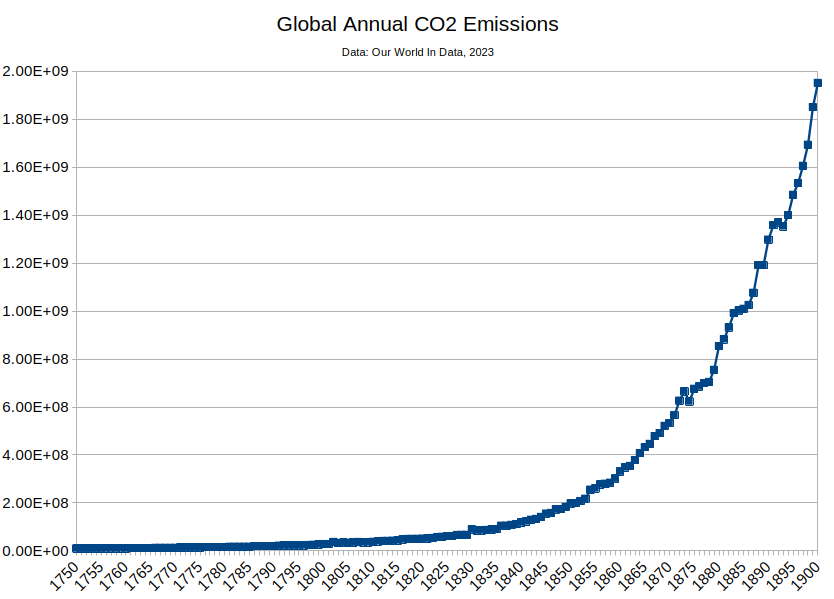
The effect of industrialisation is also shown by rising levels of CO_{2} emissions.

There has been a Retreat of glaciers in the Alps since 1850, when level of CO_{2} emissions accelerated due to industrialisation and growing world population.

In 2000, the glacier ice volume in Switzerland was 76.5 cubic kilometers. In 2021, it was 52.5 cubic kilometers.

2002 −1.0 %, 2003 −3.8 %, 2004 −1.2 %, 2005 −1.9 %, 2006 −2.3 %, 2007 −1.1 %, 2008 −1.8 %,

2009 −1.7 %, 2010 −1.3 %, 2011 −3.1 %, 2012 −2.0 %, 2013 −0.6 %, 2014 −0.8 %, 2015 −2.7 %,

2016 −1.1 %, 2017 −3.2 %, 2018 −2.9 %, 2019 −2.2 %, 2020 −2.0 %, 2021 −0.8 %, 2022 −5.9 %,

2023 −4.4 %, 2024 -2.3 %.

== See also ==
- List of mountains in Switzerland
- Switzerland#Climate
