= Brunegghorn =

Mountain in Switzerland

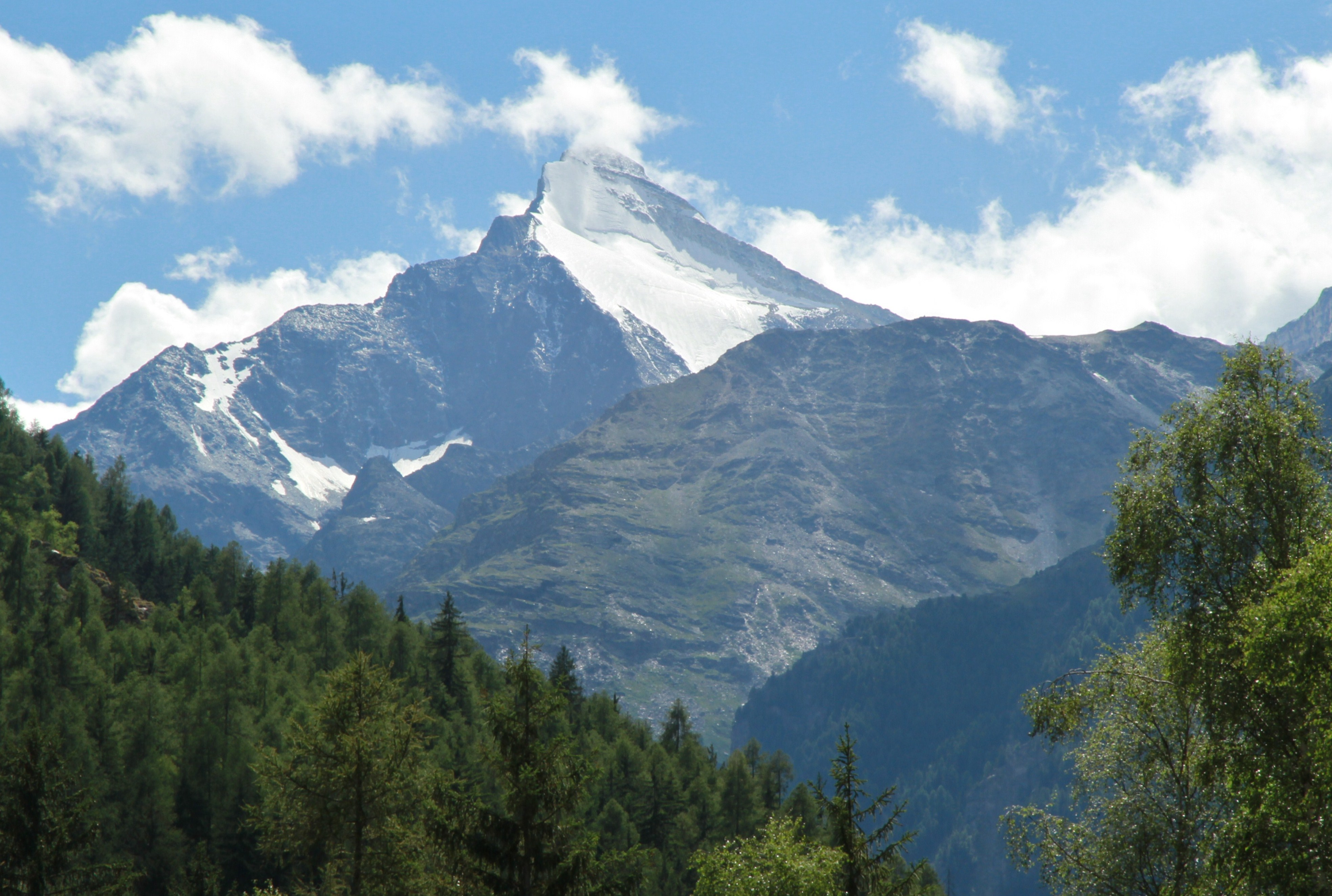
- Brunegghorn from east

Highest point
- Elevation: 3,831 m (12,569 ft)
- Prominence: 304 m (997 ft)
- Parent peak: Weisshorn
- Listing: Alpine mountains above 3000 m
- Coordinates: 46°07′33″N 7°44′45″E

Geography
- Location within Switzerland Location within Canton of Valais Location within Alps
- Location: Valais, Switzerland
- Parent range: Pennine Alps

The Brunegghorn is a mountain of the Pennine Alps, overlooking the Mattertal in the canton of Valais. It is part of the Weisshorn group. On the west side of the mountain flows the Brunegg Glacier.

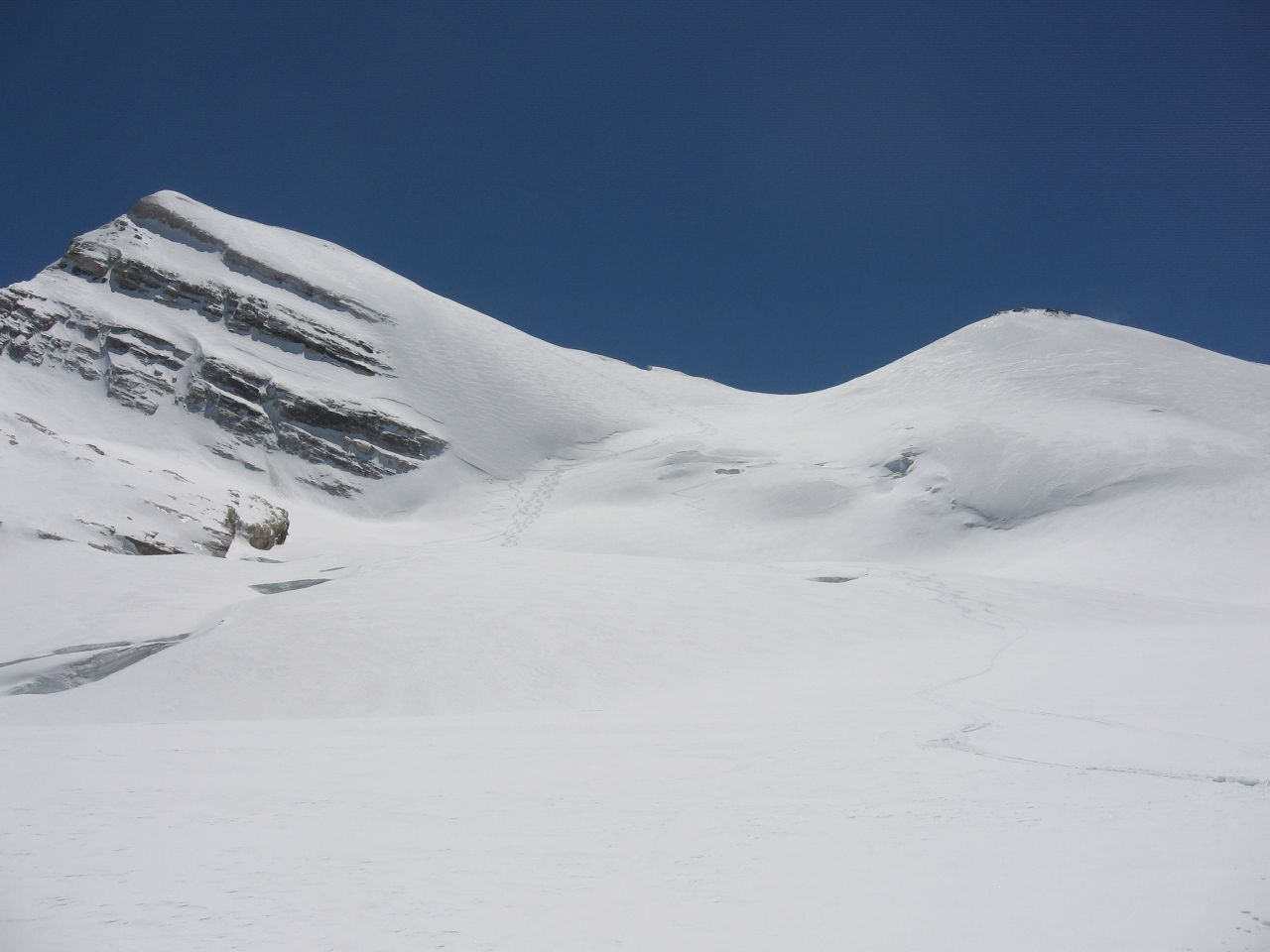
View of the Brunegghorn from the slopes of the Brunegg Glacier
