= Cima di Rosso =

Mountain in Switzerland

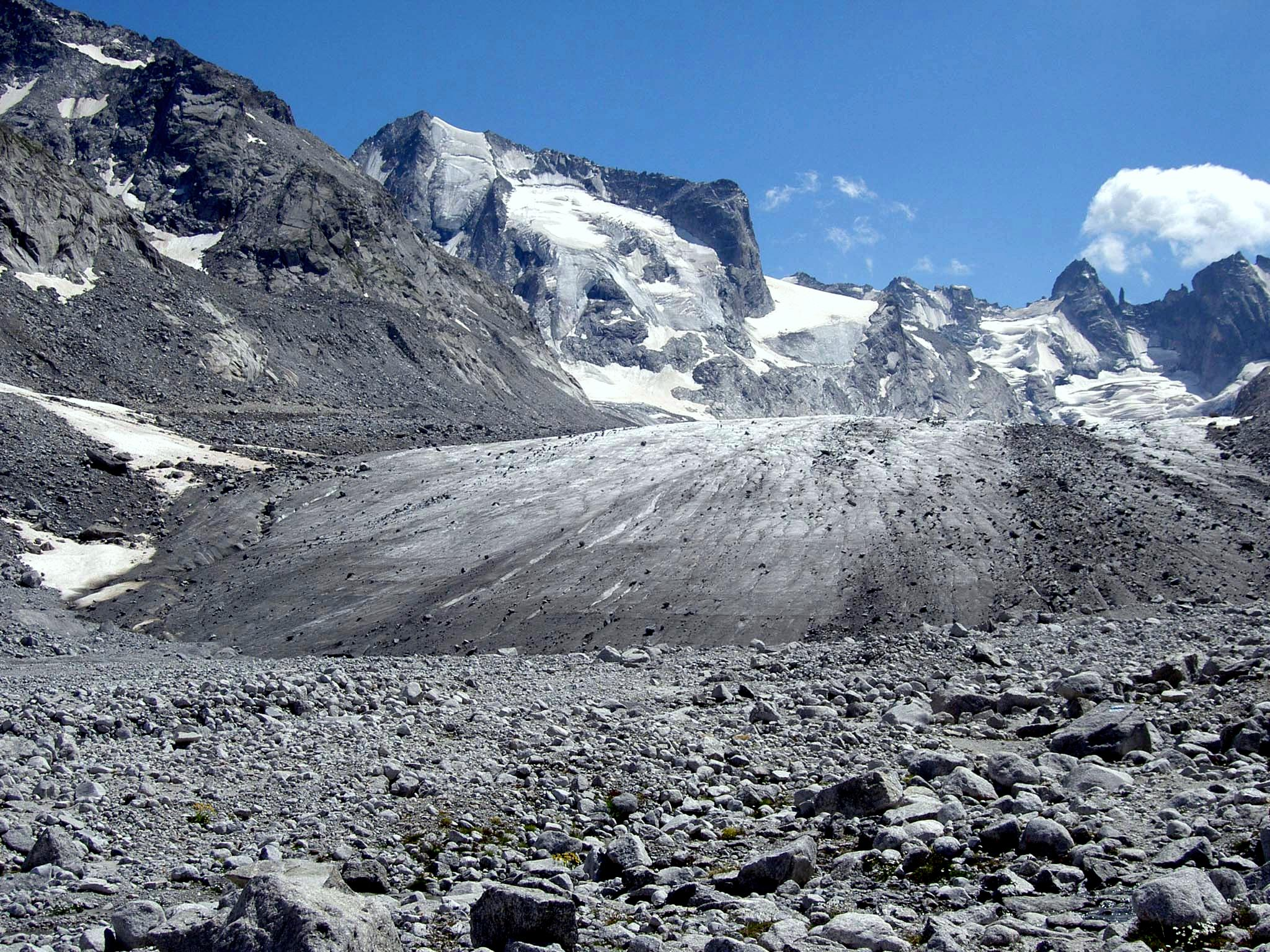
- The Cima di Rosso (centre-left) from the Forno Glacier (north side)

Highest point
- Elevation: 3,366 m (11,043 ft)
- Prominence: 266 m (873 ft)
- Parent peak: Cima di Castello
- Coordinates: 46°18′23″N 9°43′6″E

Geography
- Location within Alps
- Location: Graubünden, Switzerland; Lombardy, Italy
- Parent range: Bregaglia Range

The Cima di Rosso is a mountain in the Bregaglia Range of the Alps, located on the border between Italy and Switzerland. It lies between the valleys of Bregaglia (in Graubünden) and Malenco (in Lombardy). On the western side of the mountain is the Forno Glacier.
