= Piz Badile =

Mountain in Switzerland and Italy

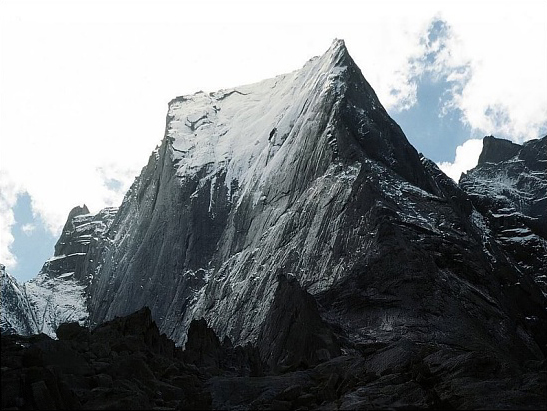
- The north-east face and north ridge of Piz Badile

Highest point
- Elevation: 3,308 m (10,853 ft)
- Prominence: 262 m (860 ft)
- Parent peak: Piz Cengalo
- Isolation: 1.1 km (0.68 mi)
- Listing: Great north faces of the Alps
- Coordinates: 46°17′41″N 9°35′10″E

Geography
- Location within Alps
- Location: Lombardy, Italy; Graubünden, Switzerland
- Parent range: Bregaglia Range

Geology
- Mountain type: Granite

Climbing
- First ascent: W. A. B. Coolidge with guides François Devouassoud and Henri Devouassoud on 27 July 1867
- Easiest route: South Ridge (Couloir Route) PD

Piz Badile (3,308 m) is a mountain of the Bregaglia range in the Swiss canton of Graubünden and the Italian region of Lombardy. The border between the two countries runs along the summit ridge. Its north-east face, overlooking the Swiss Val Bregaglia near Soglio, is considered one of the six great north faces of the Alps. The name Badile means spade or shovel (arising from the mountain's appearance when viewed from the Val Bregaglia).

== Climbing history ==
The first ascent of Piz Badile was by W. A. B. Coolidge with guides François Devouassoud and Henri Devouassoud on 27 July 1867 by the south ridge. The mountain had first come to the notice of British alpinists from D. W. Freshfield's writings of the 1860s. He gave the name 'the Grey Twins' to Piz Badile and Piz Cengalo, and made the first ascent of Piz Cengalo in 1866.

The two classic routes on Piz Badile are the north ridge and the Cassin Route on the north-east face. The north ridge – the Badilekante – was first prospected solo by the Swiss guide Christian Klucker in 1892 (Klucker later made the first ascent of the Badile's west-south-west ridge with Anton von Rydzewski and M. Barbaria on 14 June 1897). After several unsuccessful attempts by Italian parties in 1911, the ridge (IV, one pitch of V−) finally fell to Alfred Zürcher with the guide Walter Risch on 4 August 1923. F. l'Orsa and André Roch found a more direct line on the ridge on the second ascent (18 July 1926).

The most popular route on the north-east face is the Cassin Route (V+/A0 or VI+), so-called after the first ascentionist Riccardo Cassin, who climbed it with V. Ratti and G. Esposito, together with the Como team of Mario Molteni and Giuseppe Valsecchi on 14–16 July 1937. Molteni and Valsecchi were already on the face when Cassin and his party started out, but the climbers subsequently joined forces. In this famous alpine epic, Molteni died of exhaustion and exposure on the summit, whilst Valsecchi died on the descent by the south ridge just before reaching the hut.

== Gallery ==
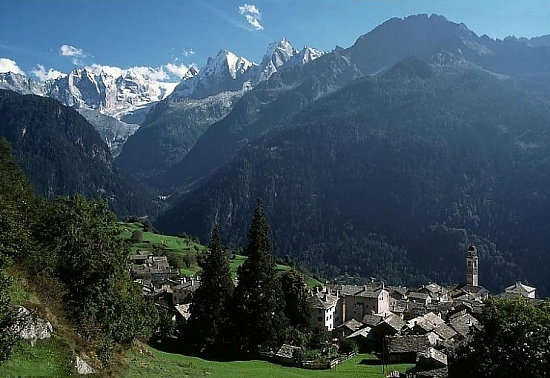
View from above Soglio of the Sciora peaks (left), Piz Cengalo (left centre) and Piz Badile (centre)

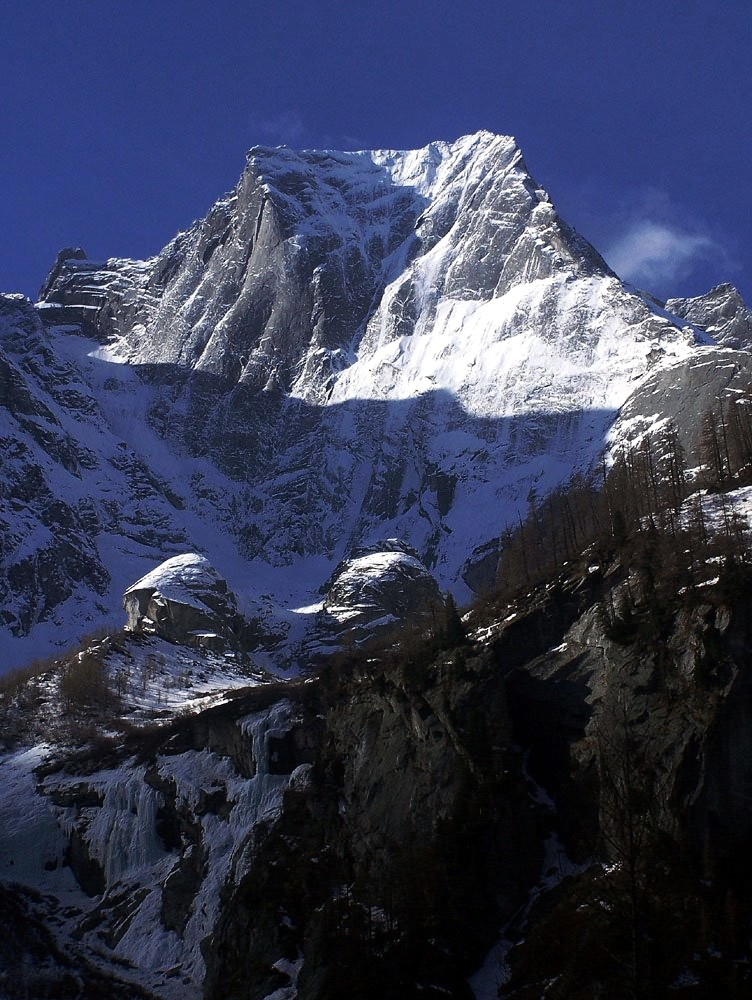
Piz Badile from the Val Bondasca

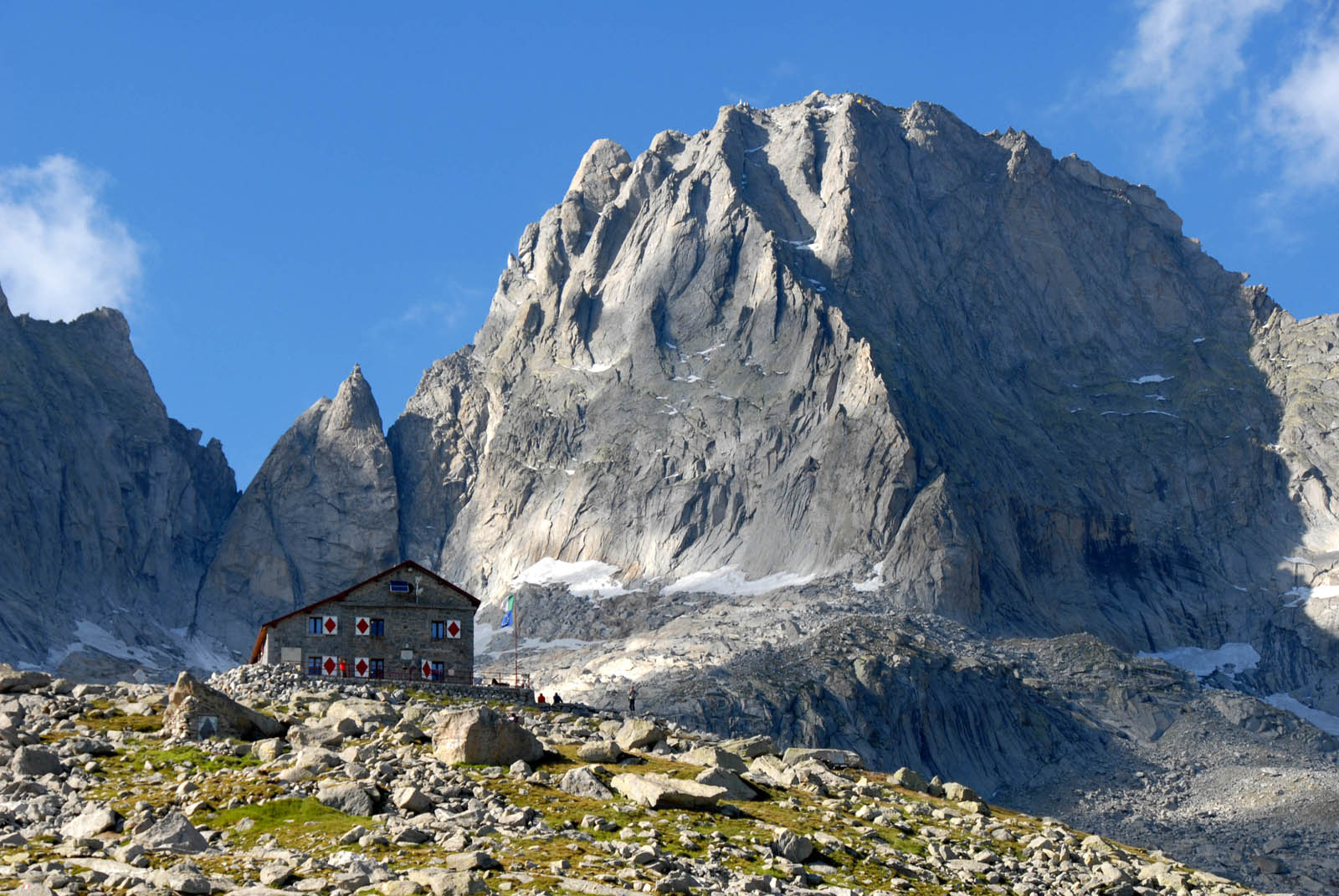
Piz Badile and the Giannetti hut from the south

== Huts ==
- Giannetti hut (2,534 m)
- Sasc Furä hut (1,904 m)
- Sciora hut (2,118 m)
