= Basòdino Glacier =

Glacier in Switzerland

Coordinates: 46°24′57″N 8°28′33″E

The Basòdino Glacier (Italian: Ghiacciaio del Basòdino) is a 1.5 km long glacier (2005) situated in the Lepontine Alps in north-western part of canton of Ticino in Switzerland. Glacier area passed from 4 km^{2} in 1850, to 2.31 km^{2} in 1973 and 1.6 km^{2} in 2022 situating at an altitude between 2600 and 3150 m at the foot of Basodino Peak (3273m).

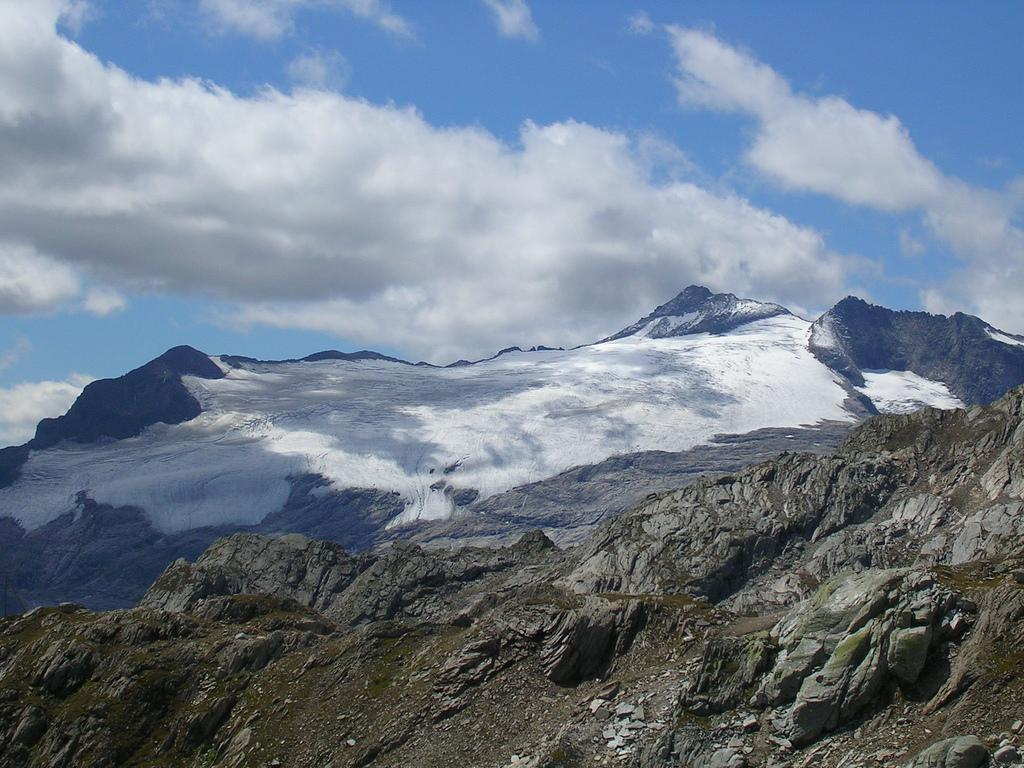
Basòdino Glacier

== See also ==
- List of glaciers in Switzerland
- Swiss Alps
