= Brenay Glacier =

Glacier in Switzerland

- Glacier du Brenay
- Interactive map of Brenay Glacier
- Location: Valais, Switzerland
- Coordinates: 45°57′59″N 7°25′13″E
- Length: 5.95 km

The Brenay Glacier (French: Glacier du Brenay) is a 5.95 km long glacier (1973) situated in the Pennine Alps in the canton of Valais in Switzerland. In 1973 it had an area of 9.96 km^{2}.

== See also ==
- List of glaciers in Switzerland
- List of glaciers
- Retreat of glaciers since 1850
- Swiss Alps
