= Silvretta Glacier =

Glacier in Switzerland

Coordinates: 46°51′6″N 10°4′38″E

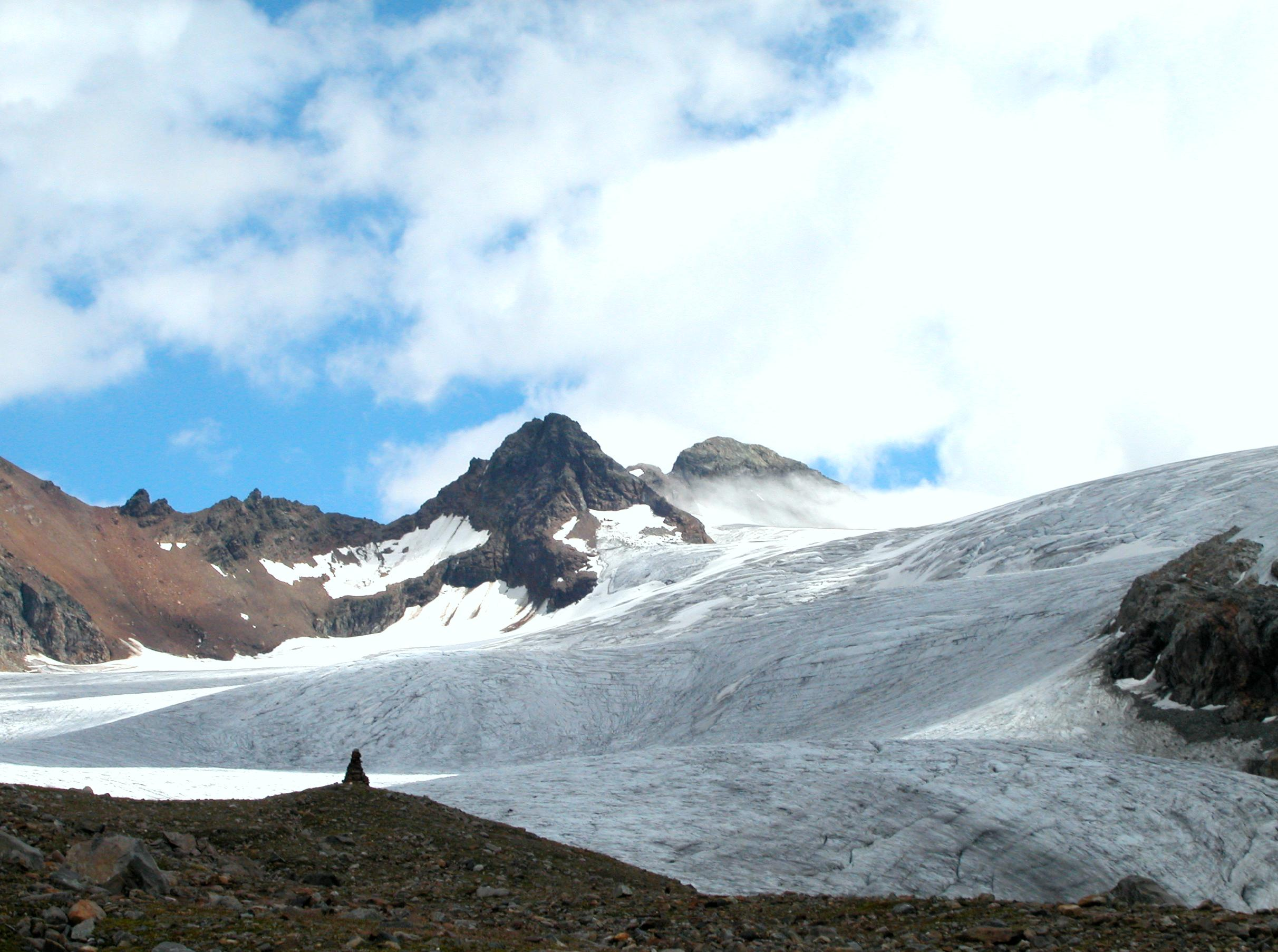
View from the west side

The Silvretta Glacier (German: Silvrettagletscher) is a 3 km long glacier (2005) situated in the Silvretta Range in the canton of Graubünden in Switzerland. In 1973 it had an area of 3.35 km^{2}.

== See also ==
- List of glaciers in Switzerland
- Swiss Alps
