= Cima di Castello =

Mountain in Switzerland

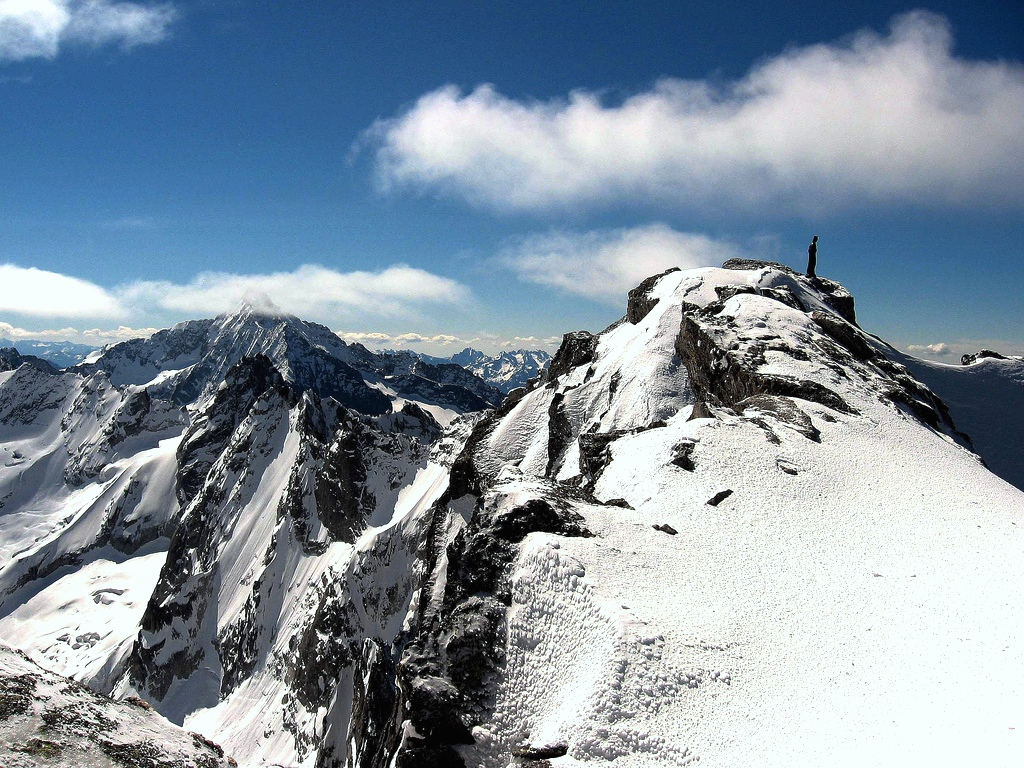
- Summit

Highest point
- Elevation: 3,379 m (11,086 ft)
- Prominence: 388 m (1,273 ft)
- Parent peak: Monte Disgrazia
- Isolation: 5.9 km (3.7 mi)
- Listing: Alpine mountains above 3000 m
- Coordinates: 46°18′10.9″N 9°40′36.5″E

Geography
- Location within Alps
- Location: Graubünden, Switzerland; Lombardy, Italy
- Parent range: Bregaglia Range

Cima di Castello is a mountain of the Bregaglia Range, located on the border between Italy and Switzerland. With a height of 3,379 metres (11,086 ft) above sea level, it is the second highest mountain in the Bregaglia Range. Its summit lies between the valleys of the Albigna and Forno Glacier (both in the Swiss canton of Graubünden) and the valley of Val Mello (in the Italian region of Lombardy).
