= La Cudera =

Glacier in Switzerland

Coordinates: 46°50′25″N 10°5′39″E

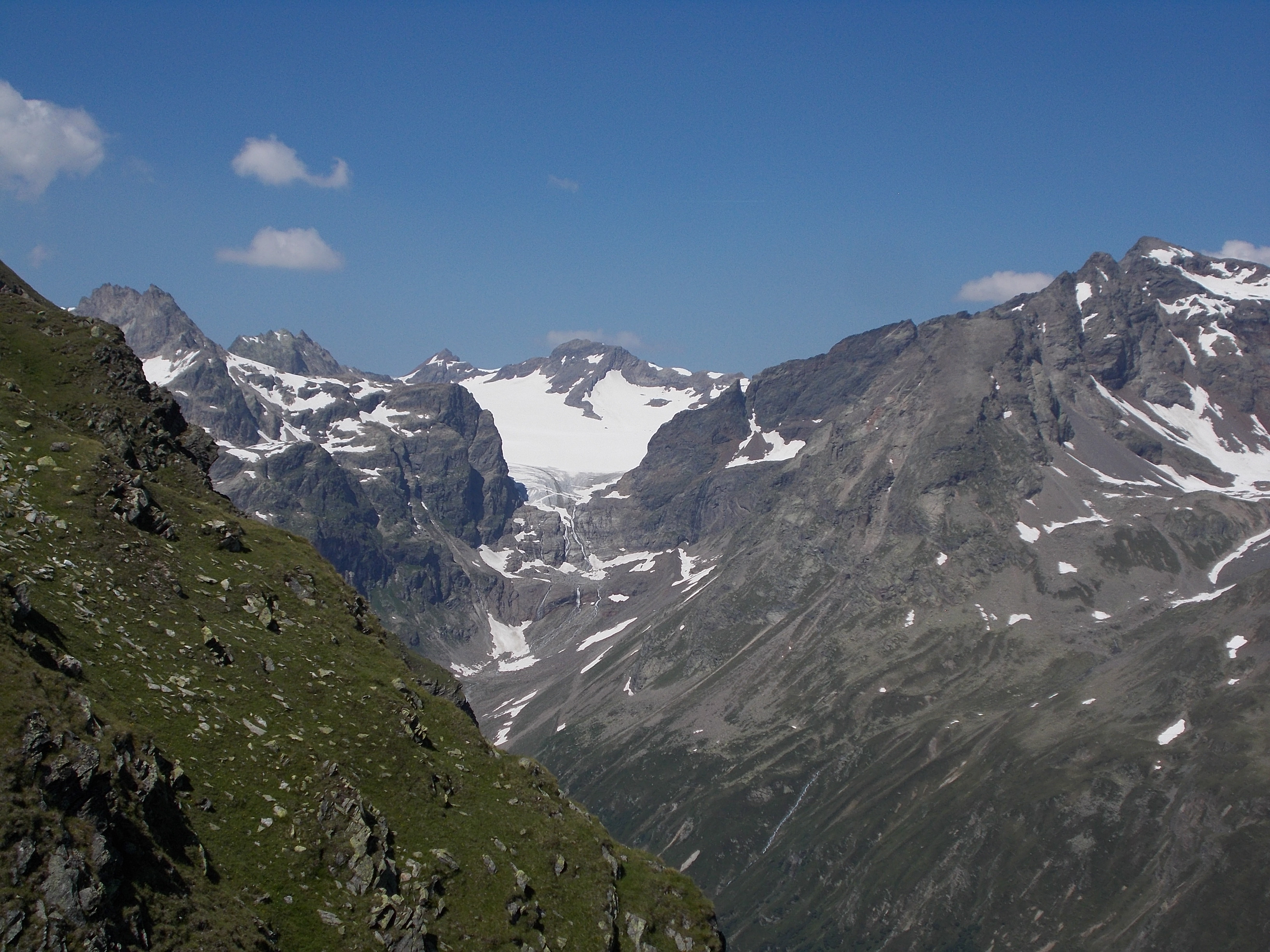
Silvrettahorn, La Cudera and Vadret Tiatscha, Signalhorn, Piz Fliana from the Sassautagrat (View from South)

La Cudera is a 2 km long glacier (2005) situated in the Silvretta Range in the canton of Graubünden in Switzerland. In 1973 it had an area of 2.07 km².

== See also ==
- List of glaciers in Switzerland
- Swiss Alps
