= Cima della Bondasca =

Mountain in Switzerland

- Pizzo del Ferro centrale
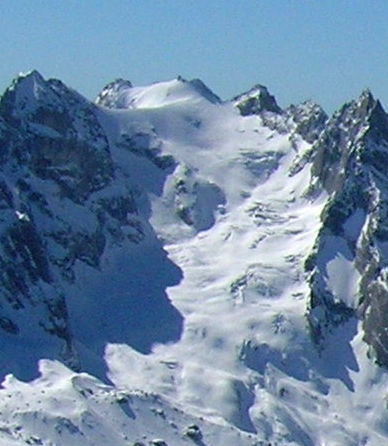

Highest point
- Elevation: 3,289 m (10,791 ft)
- Prominence: 187 m (614 ft)
- Parent peak: Piz Cengalo
- Listing: List of mountains of the Alps
- Coordinates: 46°17′15.9″N 9°37′18.2″E

Geography
- Location within Alps
- Location: Graubünden, Switzerland / Lombardy, Italy
- Parent range: Bregaglia Range

The Cima della Bondasca or Pizzo del Ferro centrale is a mountain in the Bregaglia Range (Alps), located on the border between Italy and Switzerland. Its summit is the triple watershed between Valle del Ferro (Italy), Val Bondasca and Val d'Albigna (Switzerland).

The Cima della Bondasca is the culminating point of the small range named Pizzi del Ferro, which extends between Passo di Bondo (3168 m) and Colle Masino (3061). The summits are (from west to east):

- Pizzo del Ferro occidentale (3267 m)
- Cima della Bondasca - Pizzo del Ferro centrale (3289 m)
- Torrione del Ferro (3234 m)
- Pizzo del Ferro orientale (3199 m)
