= Brunegg Glacier =

Glacier in Switzerland

- Brunegggletscher
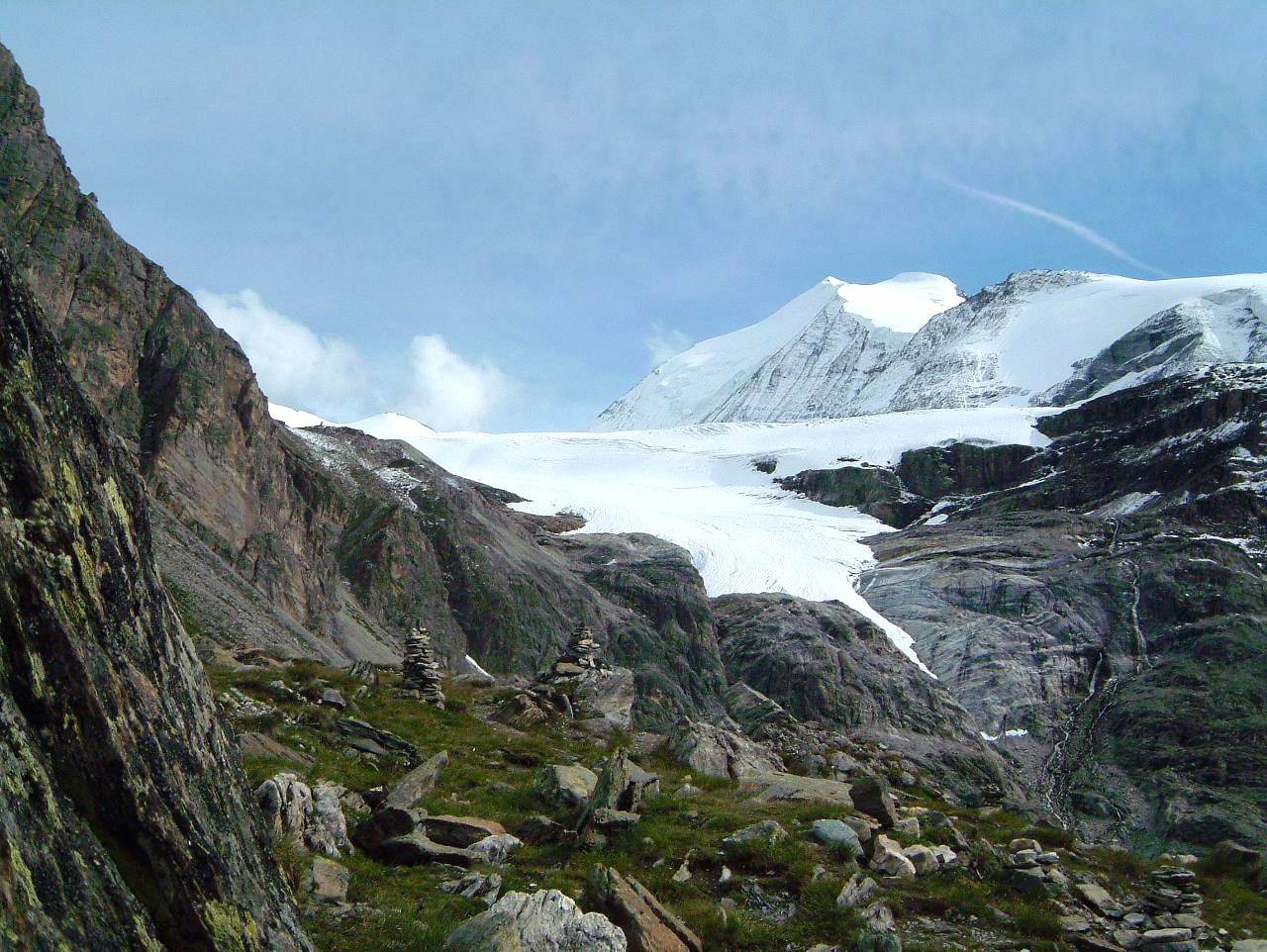
- Brunnegggletscher and Bishorn
- Interactive map of Brunegg Glacier
- Location: Valais, Switzerland
- Coordinates: 46°8′3″N 7°43′11″E
- Length: 4 km

The Brunegg Glacier (German: Brunegggletscher) is a 4 km (2.5 mi) long glacier (2005) situated in the Pennine Alps in the canton of Valais in Switzerland. In 1973 it had an area of 6.68 km^{2} (2.58 sq mi). The glacier is located north of Bishorn and Weisshorn.

== See also ==
- List of glaciers in Switzerland
- Swiss Alps
