= Pongello =

Village in Switzerland

Pongello is a small village in Graubünden, Switzerland. It is the ancestral place of the Pontisella family, which was already famous in the 13th century. It lies above Vicosoprano towards Roticcio.

== Literature ==
- Lutz, Markus: Geographisch-Statistisches Handlexikon der Schweiz für Reisende und Geschäftsmänner ... nebst einem Wegweiser durch die Eidsgenossenschaft sammt Nachrichten für Reisende über Postenlauf, Geldeswerth und Gasthöfe. (1822)
