= Bregaglia Range =

Mountain range in Switzerland and Italy

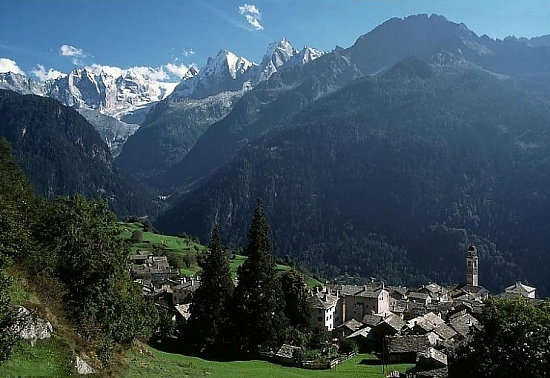
- View across the village of Soglio (foreground) to the peaks of the western Bregaglia – the Sciora peaks (left), Piz Cengalo (left centre) and Piz Badile (centre)

Highest point
- Peak: Monte Disgrazia, Italy
- Elevation: 3,678 m (12,067 ft)
- Listing: Mountains of Italy
- Coordinates: 46°16′09″N 9°44′57″E

Geography
- Countries: Italy and Switzerland
- Cantons/Regions: Grisons and Lombardy
- Range coordinates: 46°17.7′N 9°42.3′E
- Parent range: Rhaetian Alps

The Bregaglia Range (commonly the Bregaglia) is a small group of mostly granite mountains in Graubünden, Switzerland and the Province of Sondrio, northern Italy. It derives its name from the partly Swiss, partly Italian valley, the Val Bregaglia, and is known as Bergell in German. Other names which are applied to the range include the Val Masino Alps and, to describe the main ridge, Masino-Bregaglia-Disgrazia. Vicosoprano (1,067 m) is the main settlement in the Swiss part of the range.

The range is a popular mountaineering destination, and includes such peaks as Monte Disgrazia, Piz Cengalo and Piz Badile. Well-known mountaineers who are associated with the area and have made significant first ascents in the range include Leslie Stephen, D. W. Freshfield, W. A. B. Coolidge, Christian Klucker, Paul Güssfeldt and Riccardo Cassin.

A cable-car service runs from Pranzaira to the Albigna lake, and the Albigna hut (2,331 m) is a further 30–45-minute walk up the east side of the barrage.

== Significant peaks ==
| Mountain/peak | Height (metres) |
|---|---|
| Monte Disgrazia | 3,678 |
| Cima di Castello | 3,375 |
| Cima di Rosso | 3,369 |
| Piz Cengalo | 3,367 |
| Cima dal Cantun | 3,354 |
| Monte Sissone | 3,330 |
| Piz Badile | 3,308 |
| Sciora di Dentro | 3,275 |
| Cima della Bondasca | 3,267 |
| Piz Bacun | 3,244 |
| Punta Pioda | 3,238 |
| Pizzi Gemelli | 3,223 |
| Monte del Forno | 3,214 |
| Ago di Sciora | 3,205 |
| Monte di Zocca | 3,175 |
| Piz Badilet | 3,171 |
| Sciora di Fuori (Sciora Dafora) | 3,169 |
| Piz Cacciabella | 2,980 |
| Torre Innominata | 2,969 |
| Piz Trubinasca | 2,918 |
| Monte Spluga | 2,841 |

== Glaciers ==
Main glaciers :

- Forno Glacier
- Albigna Glacier

== Photo gallery ==
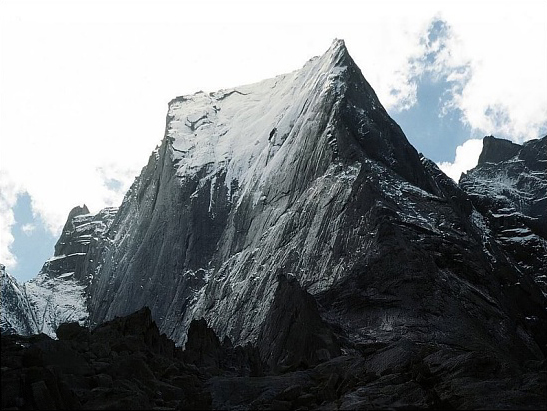
Piz Badile above the Val Bondasca

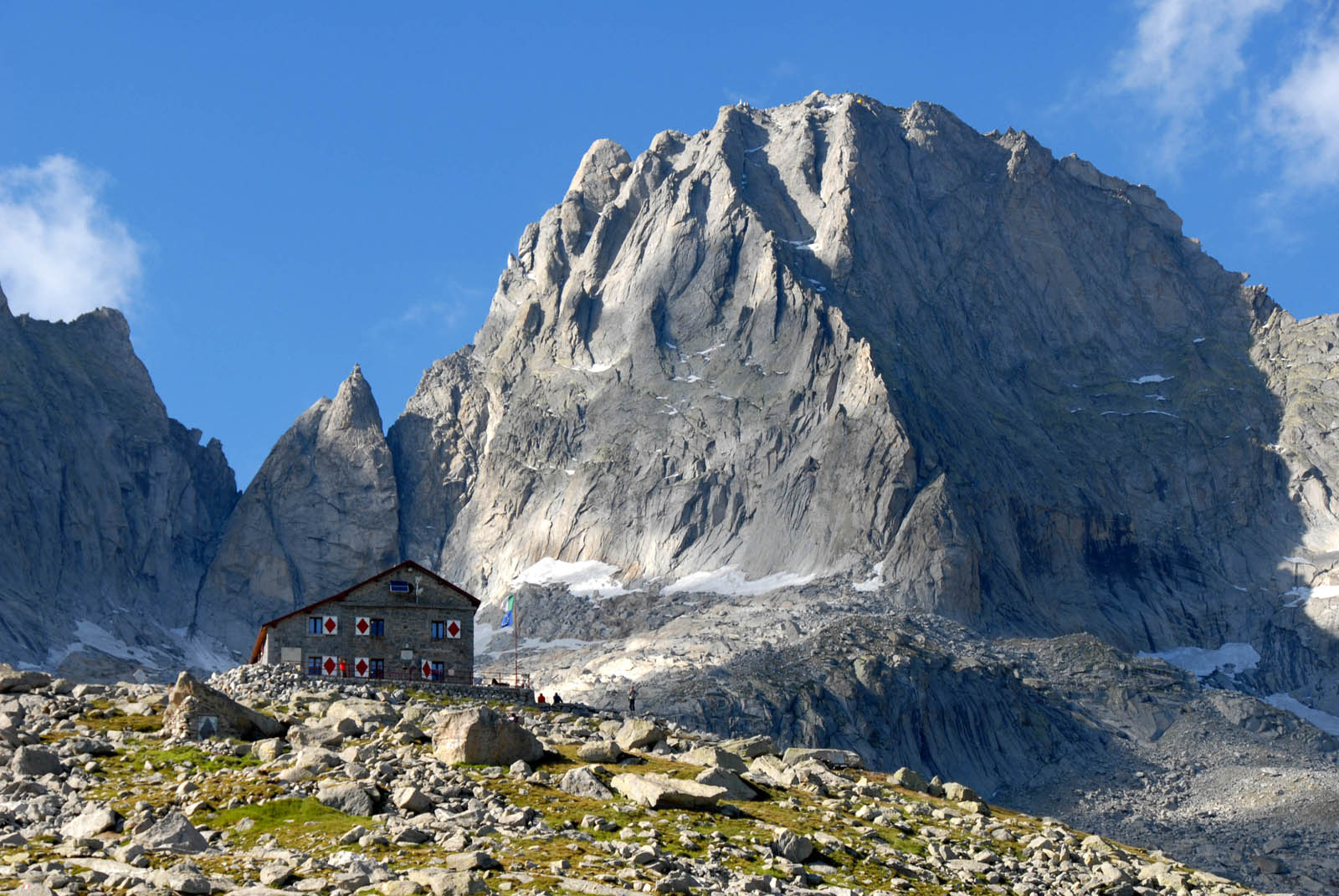
Piz Badile from the south

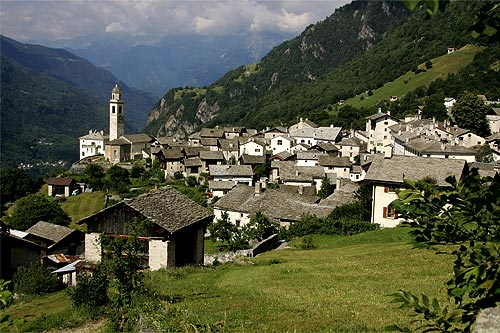
Soglio

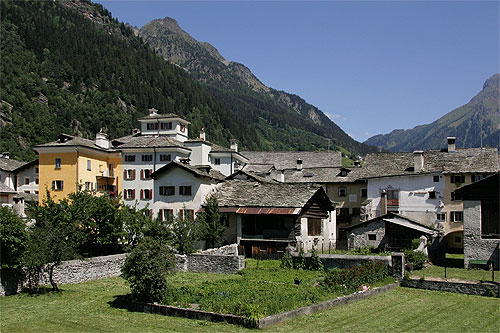
Vicosoprano

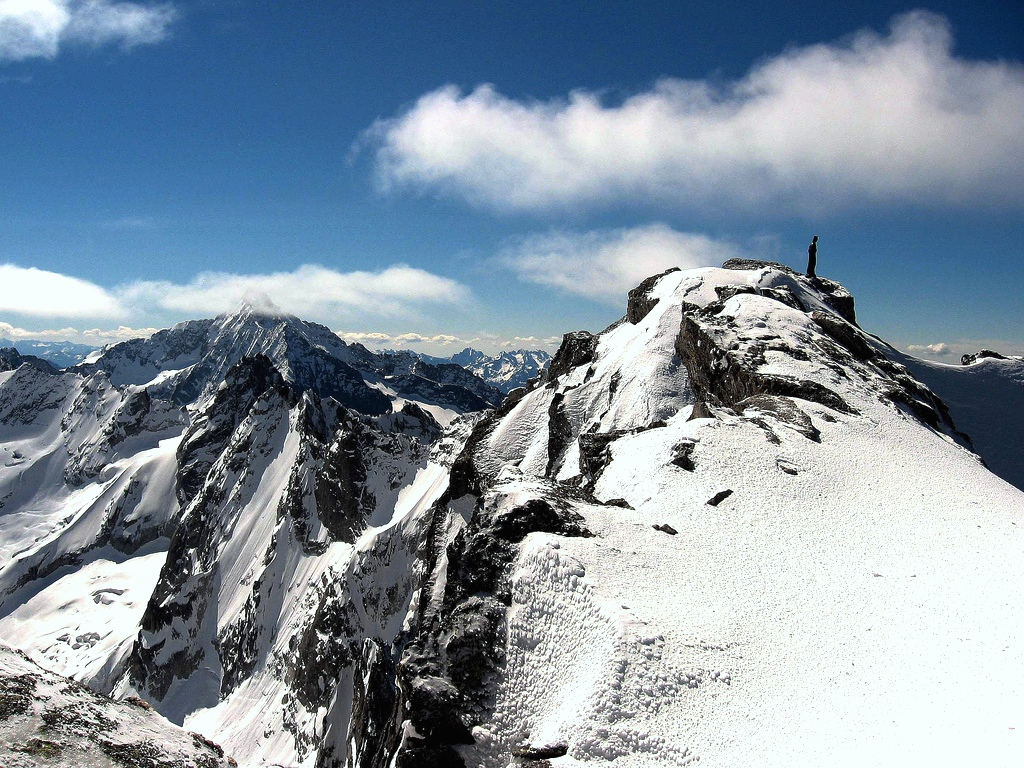
Cima di Castello

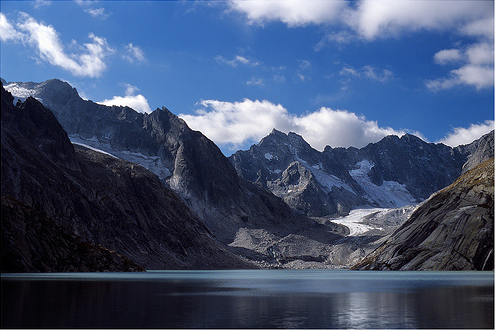
Albigna lake

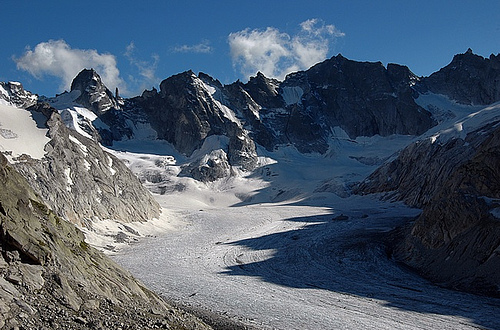
Forno Glacier

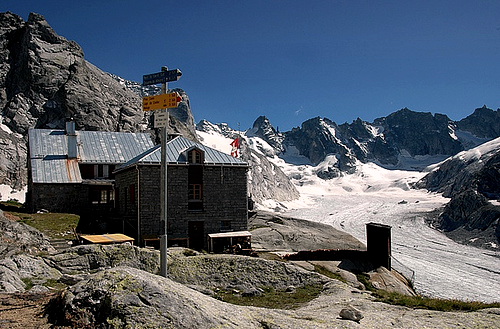
Forno hut

== See also ==
- Swiss Alps
