= Albigna Glacier =

Glacier in Switzerland

- Vadrec da l'Albigna
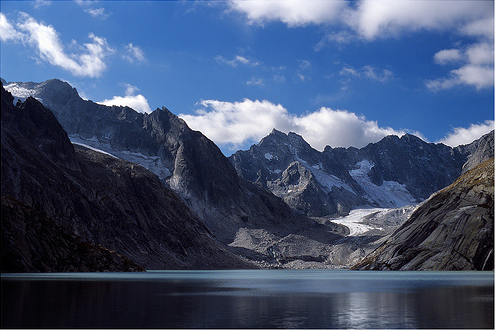
- Lake Albigna and glacier

- Location within Switzerland Location within Alps
- Interactive map of Albigna Glacier
- Location: Graubünden, Switzerland
- Coordinates: 46°18′19″N 9°38′41″E
- Length: 3.5 km (2.2 mi)

The Albigna Glacier (Romansh: Vadrec da l'Albigna, Lombard: vadret da l'albigna) is a 3.5 km long glacier (2005) situated in the Bregaglia Range in the canton of Graubünden in Switzerland. In 1973 it had an area of 3.53 km^{2}.

== See also ==
- List of glaciers in Switzerland
- Swiss Alps
