= Albigna lake =

- Lägh da l'Albigna; Lago da l'Albigna
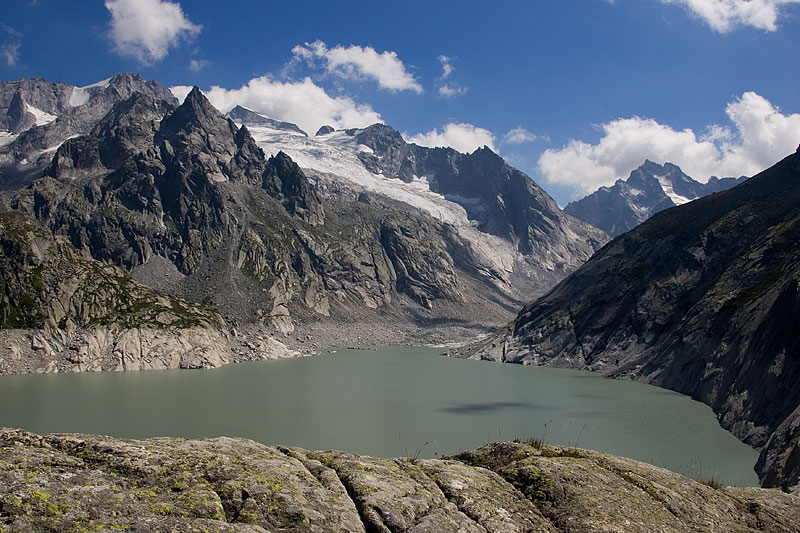

- Location within Canton of Graubünden Location within Switzerland Location within Italy Location within Alps
- Interactive map of Albigna lake
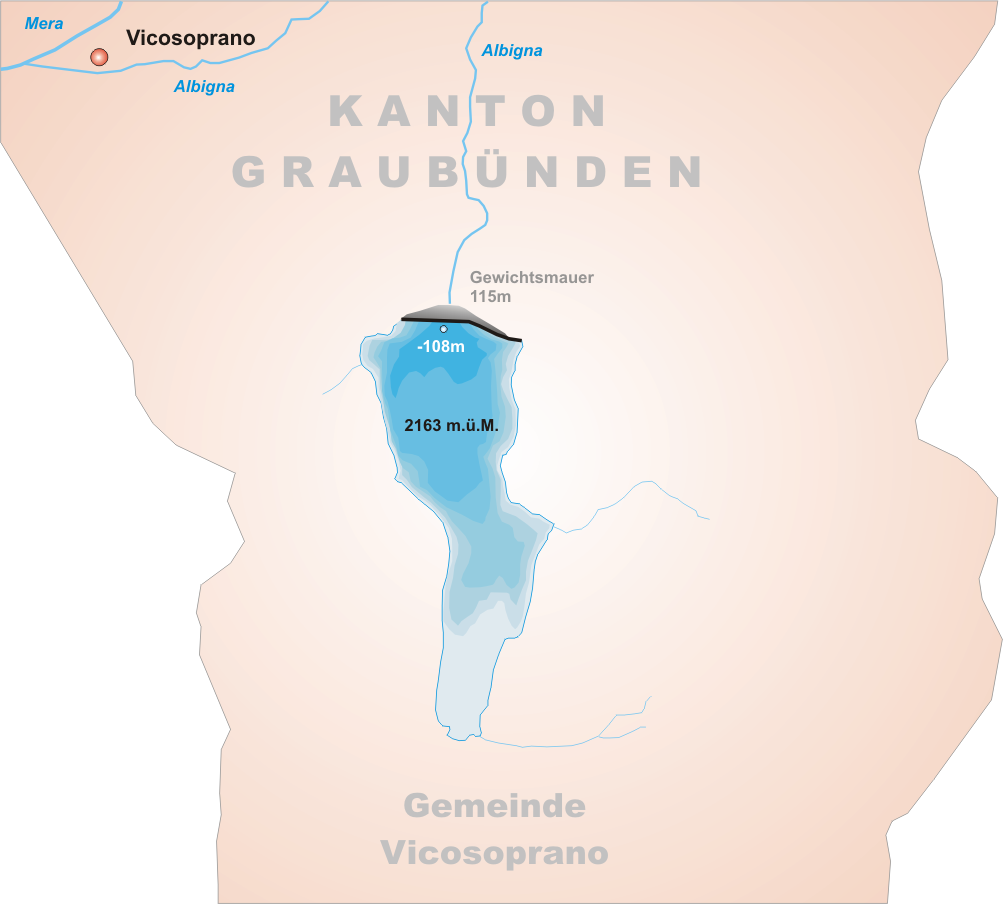
- Location: Bregaglia, Graubünden
- Coordinates: 46°19′48″N 9°38′51″E
- Type: reservoir
- Primary inflows: mountain streams
- Primary outflows: Albigna
- Catchment area: 20.5 km^{2} (7.9 sq mi)
- Basin countries: Switzerland
- Surface area: 1.13 km^{2} (0.44 sq mi)
- Max. depth: 108 m (354 ft)
- Surface elevation: 2,163 m (7,096 ft)

Albigna Lake (German: Albignasee, Italian: Lago da l'Albigna, Romansh: Lägh da l'Albigna) is a reservoir in the canton of Graubünden, Switzerland. It is located in the municipality of Vicosoprano at an elevation of 2,163 metres (7,096 ft) on the southwest side of the Bregaglia valley, northeast of Pizzo Cacciabella. The lake has a surface area of 1.13 square kilometres (280 acres). Its outflow, the Albigna River, is a left tributary of the Mera River.

== See also ==
- List of lakes of Switzerland
- List of mountain lakes of Switzerland
