= Piz Cengalo =

Mountain in the Bregaglia range of the Alps

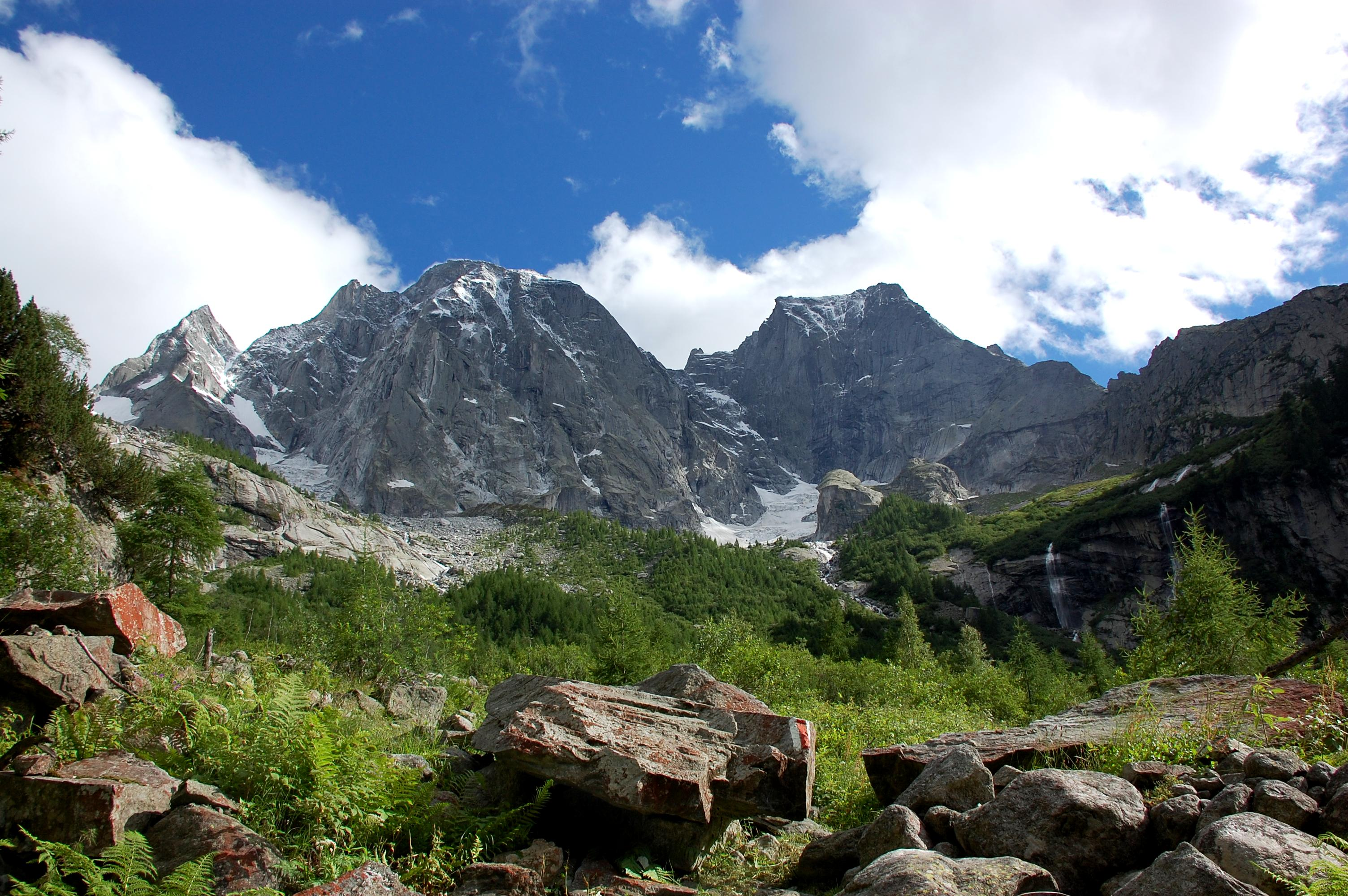
- Piz Cengalo (left) and Piz Badile (right) from the north side

Highest point
- Elevation: 3,369 m (11,053 ft)
- Prominence: 620 m (2,030 ft)
- Parent peak: Monte Disgrazia
- Isolation: 5.8 km (3.6 mi)
- Listing: Mountains of Switzerland, Alpine mountains above 3000 m
- Coordinates: 46°17′41.1″N 9°36′07.4″E

Geography
- Location within Alps
- Location: Lombardy, Italy; Graubünden, Switzerland
- Parent range: Bregaglia Range

Geology
- Mountain type: Granite

Climbing
- First ascent: 25 July 1866 D. W. Freshfield and C. Comyns Tucker with guide F. Dévouassoud
- Easiest route: West Ridge (PD)

Piz Cengalo ([tʃ´ɛŋɡalɔ]) (3,369 m) is a mountain in the Bregaglia range of the Alps on the border between the Swiss canton of Graubünden and Italy. The first ascent of the mountain was by D. W. Freshfield and C. Comyns Tucker with guide F. Dévouassoud on 25 July 1866. The name 'Cengalo' derives from Tschingel, meaning girdle.

On 28 December 2011 c. 1.5 million cubic metres of rock broke away from the summit area, causing a massive landslide on the Swiss side of the mountain that could be heard in Soglio and Bondo. As subsequent massive rockfalls are expected in the same area, some hiking and climbing routes have been closed. On 23 August 2017 another landslide occurred on the mountain, estimated about three times bigger than the one in 2011.
