= Christian Klucker =

Swiss mountain guide

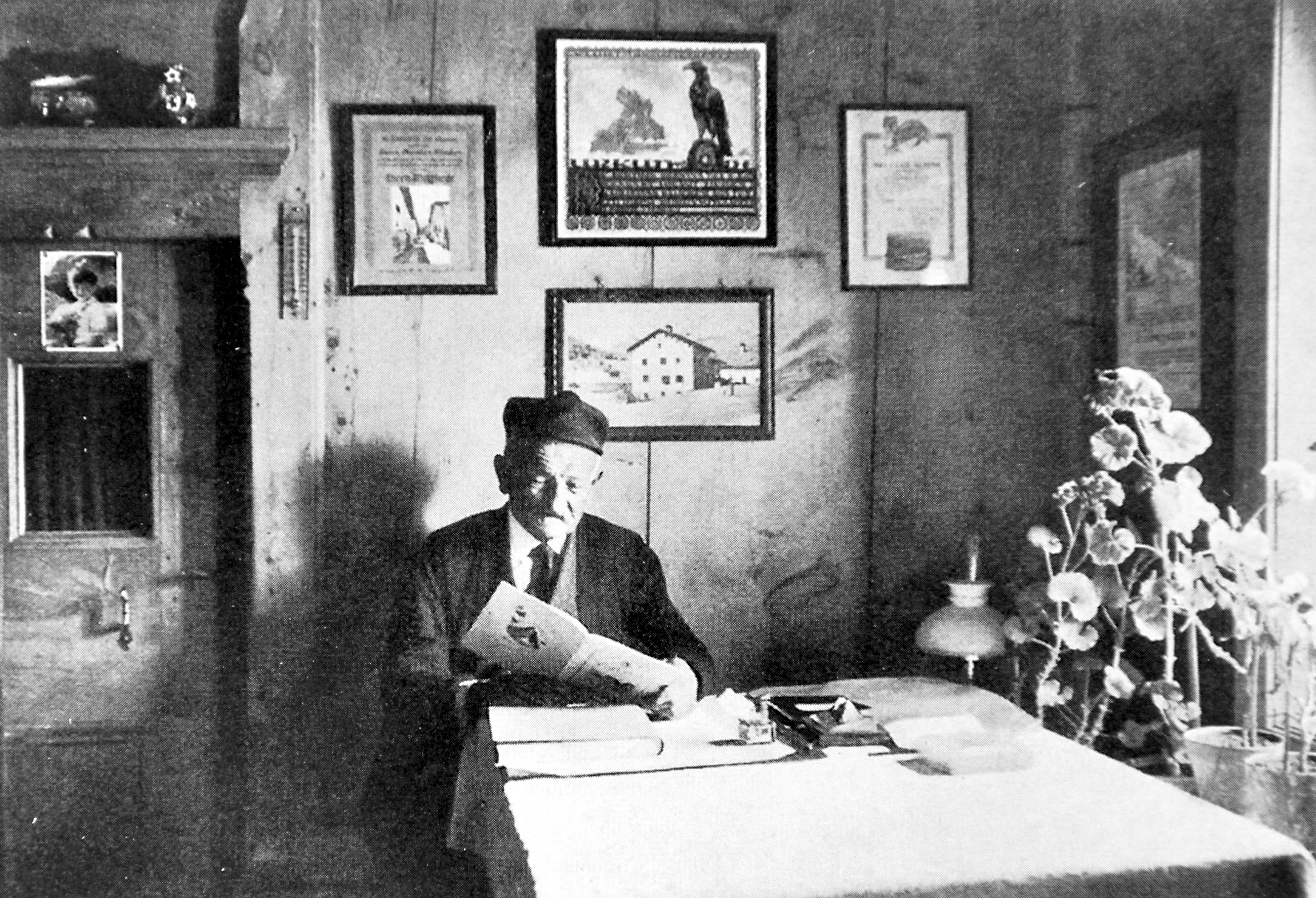
Klucker at his house in Fextal

Christian Klucker (28 September 1853 – 21 December 1928) was a Swiss mountain guide who made many first ascents in the Alps, particularly in the Bernina Range, the Bregaglia and the Pennine Alps.

Among his first ascents were:

- Gurgel (couloir) on the north-east face of Piz Bernina on 18 June 1890 (with Ludwig Norman-Neruda)
- The north-west face of Piz Scerscen on 9 July 1890 (with L. Norman-Neruda)
- The north-east face of Piz Roseg on 16 July 1890 (with L. Norman-Neruda)
- The east-north-east ridge of the Ober Gabelhorn on 1 August 1890 (with L. Norman-Neruda)
- 'Norman-Neruda route' on the north-east face of Lyskamm on 9 August 1890 (with L. Norman-Neruda and J. Reinstadler)
- Nadelgrat from the Hohberghorn to the Lenzspitze in 1892
- Peuterey ridge to the summit of Mont Blanc via a couloir on the Brenva face on 15–19 August 1893 (with Paul Güssfeldt, Emile Rey and César Ollier)
- The west-south-west ridge of Piz Badile on 14 June 1897 (with Anton von Rydzewski and M. Barbaria)
- First traverse from the Italian side of the Porta da Roseg on Piz Roseg on 21 June 1898 (with M. Barbaria)

Klucker appeared as the character Otto Spring (a guide) in the 1929 mountain film, The White Hell of Pitz Palu, directed by Arnold Fanck.
