= Monte Disgrazia =

Mountain in Italy

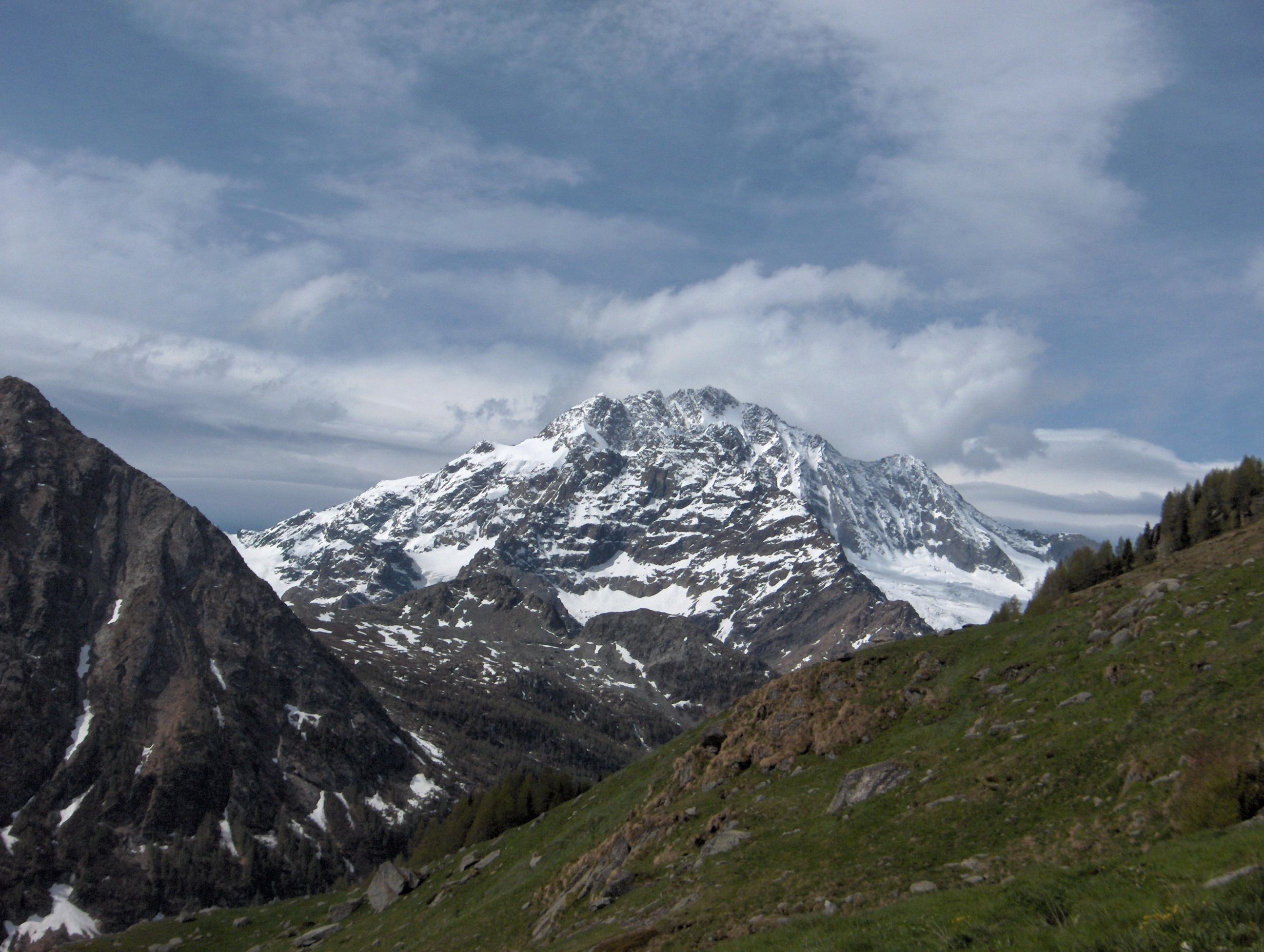
- Monte Disgrazia

Highest point
- Elevation: 3,678 m (12,067 ft)
- Prominence: 1,118 m (3,668 ft)
- Parent peak: Piz Bernina
- Isolation: 15.2 km (9.4 mi)
- Listing: Alpine mountains above 3000 m
- Coordinates: 46°16′9″N 9°44′57″E

Naming
- Native name: Mont Des'giascia (Lombard)

Geography
- Location within Italy
- Location: Lombardy, Italy
- Parent range: Bregaglia Range

Geology
- Mountain type: Granite

Climbing
- First ascent: 23 August 1862 by Leslie Stephen, E. S. Kennedy and Thomas Cox with guide Melchior Anderegg
- Easiest route: Northwest ridge (II)

Monte Disgrazia ('Mount Disgrace'; adapting Lombard: Mont Des'giascia, lit. 'Mount Defrost'; 3,678 m) is a mountain in the Bregaglia range in the Italian Alps. It is the highest peak in the Val Masino group, situated south of the Bernina Range.

It has five glaciers and five wild ridges and is a demanding climb.

The first ascent was by Leslie Stephen, E. S. Kennedy and Thomas Cox with guide Melchior Anderegg on 23 August 1862. Their route over the Preda Rossa glacier and the northwest ridge is the easiest one and has remained the normal climbing route. The first guideless ascent was made on 12 August 1882 by Charles Pilkington, his brother Lawrence and Eustace Hulton, who climbed by a new route via NE arete.

== Gallery ==
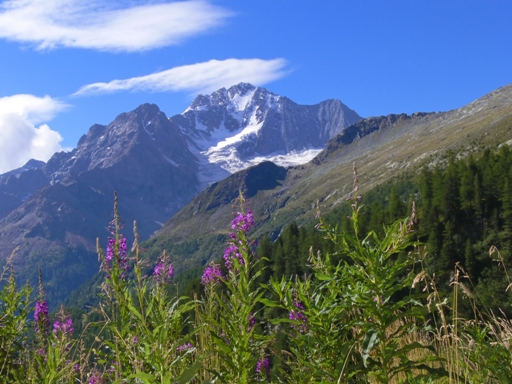
Monte Disgrazia from Sentiero Rusca, Chiareggio, Italy.
