= Vicosoprano =

- Former municipality
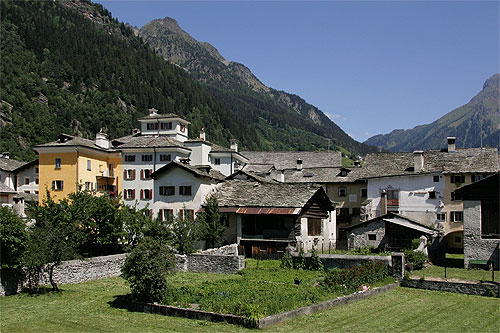
- Vicosoprano

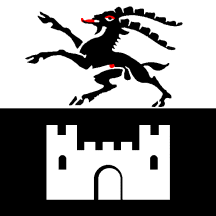
- Flag Coat of arms
- Location of Vicosoprano
- Location within Switzerland Location within Canton of Graubünden
- Coordinates: 46°21′N 9°37′E
- Country: Switzerland
- Canton: Graubünden
- District: Maloja

Area
  - Total: 54.01 km^{2} (20.85 sq mi)
- Elevation: 1,067 m (3,501 ft)

Population (December 2008)
  - Total: 445
  - Density: 8.24/km^{2} (21.3/sq mi)
- Time zone: UTC+01:00 (CET)
  - Summer (DST): UTC+02:00 (CEST)
- Postal code: 7603
- SFOS number: 3776
- ISO 3166 code: CH-GR
- Surrounded by: Bondo, Soglio, Stampa, Val Masino (IT-SO)
- Website: SFSO statistics

Vicosoprano is a former municipality in the district of Maloja in the Swiss canton of Graubünden and is the largest village in the Val Bregaglia. It's now part of the municipality of Bregaglia.

== History ==
Vicosoprano is first mentioned in 1096 as Vicus Supranus.

== Geography ==
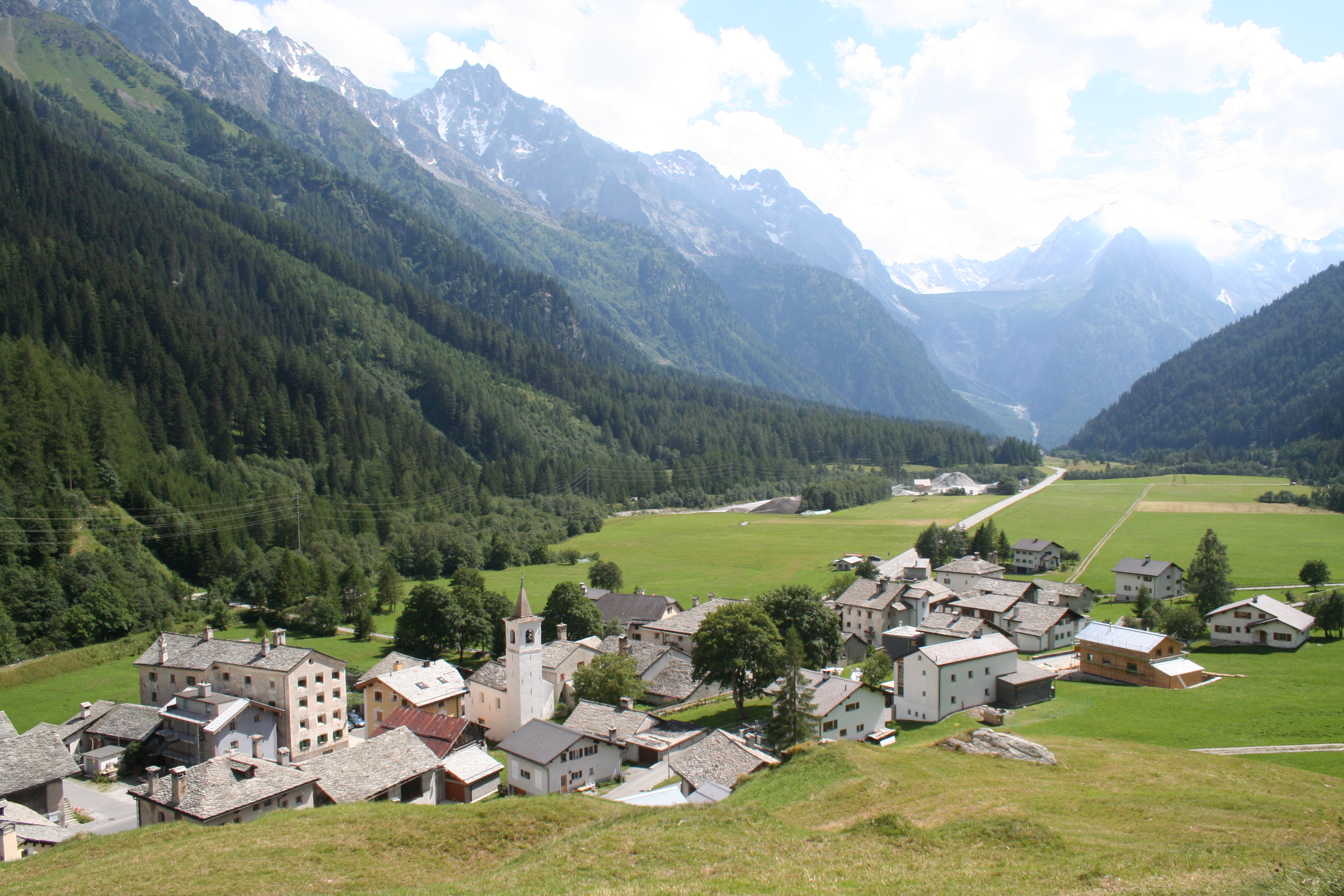
Casaccia village, part of Vicosoprano

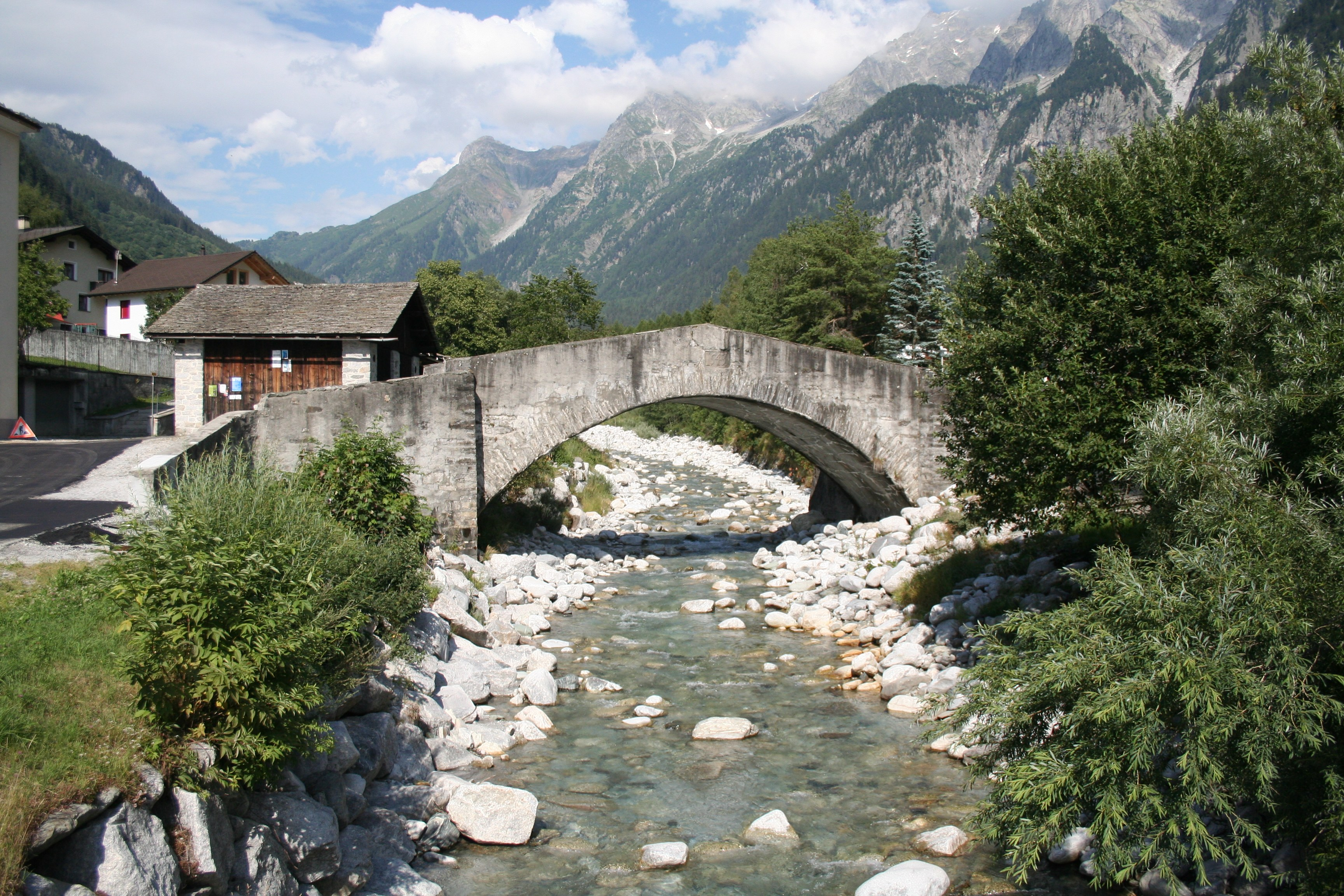
Mera river in Vicosoprano

Vicosoprano has an area, as of 2006, of 54 km^{2} (21 sq mi). Of this area, 8.6% is used for agricultural purposes, while 25.6% is forested. Of the rest of the land, 1% is settled (buildings or roads) and the remainder (64.7%) is non-productive (rivers, glaciers, or mountains).

The municipality is located in the Bergell sub-district of the Maloja district. It is the largest municipality of the Bergell sub-district. It consists of the village of Vicosoprano (elev. 1,067 m (3,501 ft)) and the hamlets of Roticcio and Pongello. In 1971 the settlement of Casaccia joined Vicosoprano.

On 1 January 2010 the municipalities of Bondo, Castasegna, Soglio, Stampa, and Vicosoprano merged into a new municipality, Bregaglia.

== Demographics ==
Vicosoprano had a population (as of 2008) of 445, of which 9.7% are foreign nationals. Over the last 10 years, the population has decreased at a rate of -10.2%.

As of 2000, the gender distribution of the population was 48.4% male and 51.6% female. The age distribution, as of 2000, in Vicosoprano is; 67 children or 15.6% of the population are between 0 and 9 years old. 34 teenagers or 7.9% are 10 to 14, and 14 teenagers or 3.3% are 15 to 19. Of the adult population, 39 people or 9.1% of the population are between 20 and 29 years old. 55 people or 12.8% are 30 to 39, 82 people or 19.1% are 40 to 49, and 42 people or 9.8% are 50 to 59. The senior population distribution is 33 people or 7.7% of the population are between 60 and 69 years old, 38 people or 8.9% are 70 to 79, there are 18 people or 4.2% who are 80 to 89, and there are 7 people or 1.6% who are 90 to 99.

In the 2007 federal election, the most popular party was the SVP which received 64.6% of the vote. The next three most popular parties were the SP (18.9%), the FDP (14.3%), and the CVP (2.1%).

The entire Swiss population is generally well educated. In Vicosoprano about 66.7% of the population (between age 25–64) have completed either non-mandatory upper secondary education or additional higher education (either University or a Fachhochschule).

Vicosoprano has an unemployment rate of 0.96%. As of 2005, there were 24 people employed in the primary economic sector and about 11 businesses involved in this sector. 130 people are employed in the secondary sector and there are 15 businesses in this sector. 89 people are employed in the tertiary sector, with 19 businesses in this sector.

The historical population is given in the following table:

year	population
1850	383
1900	417
1950	415
1960	568^{a}
1970	387
2000	429

^a Population increase during construction of the dam at Albigna.

== Languages ==
Most of the population (as of 2000) speaks Italian (80.7%), with German being second most common (12.8%) and Romansh being third ( 4.2%). The majority of the population speaks the local dialect of Lombard.

Languages in Vicosoprano
Languages	Census 1980		Census 1990		Census 2000	
Languages	Number	Percent	Number	Percent	Number	Percent
German	43	10.83%	41	10.43%	55	12.82%
Romansh	8	2.02%	16	4.07%	18	4.20%
Italian	342	86.15%	329	83.72%	346	80.65%
Population	397	100%	393	100%	429	100%

== Weather ==
Vicosoprano has an average of 111.4 days of rain per year and on average receives 1,492 mm (58.7 in) of precipitation. The wettest month is May during which time Vicosoprano receives an average of 185 mm (7.3 in) of precipitation. During this month there is precipitation for an average of 13.3 days. The driest month of the year is February with an average of 72 mm (2.8 in) of precipitation over 13.3 days.
