= Forno Glacier =

Glacier in Switzerland

- Vadrec del Forno
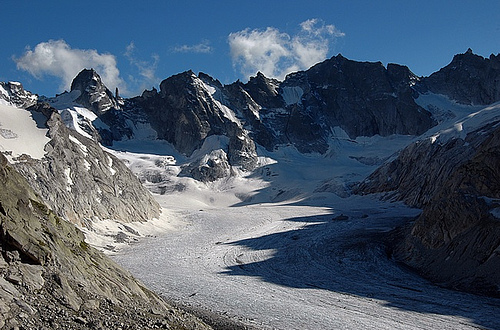
- Interactive map of Forno Glacier
- Location: Graubünden, Switzerland
- Coordinates: 46°19′28″N 9°42′5″E
- Length: 6 km

The Forno Glacier (Romansh: Vadrec del Forno) is a 6 km long glacier (2005) situated in the Bregaglia Range in the canton of Graubünden in Switzerland. In 1973 it had an area of 8.72 km^{2}.

== See also ==
- List of glaciers in Switzerland
- List of glaciers
- Retreat of glaciers since 1850
- Swiss Alps
