= Marco e Rosa Hut =

Mountain refuge on Piz Bernina, Italy

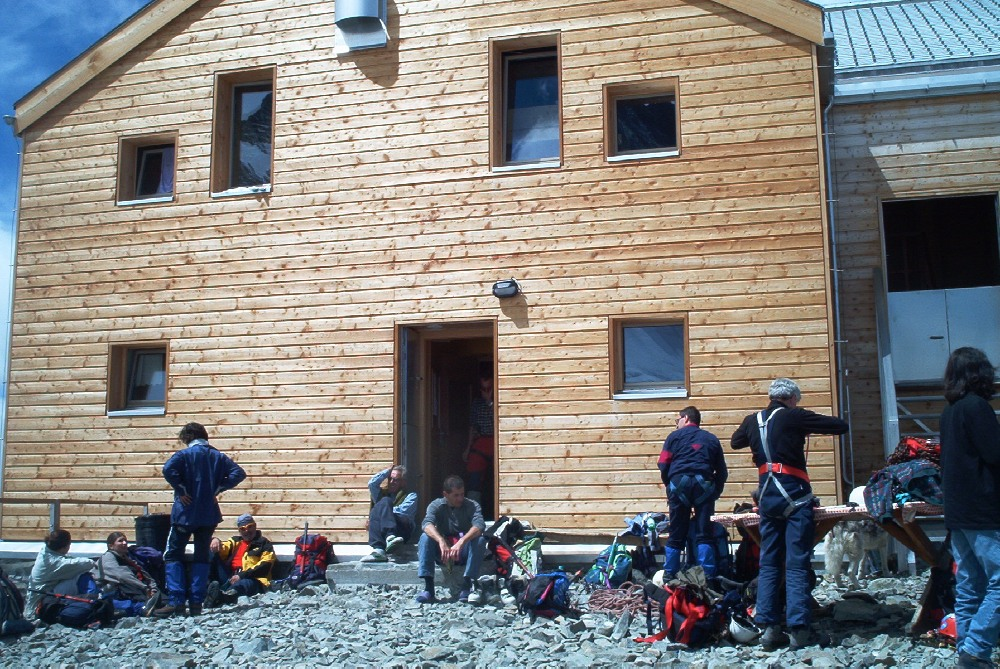
- Interactive map of the Marco e Rosa Hut area

General information
- Location: Lanzada
- Coordinates: 46.37365°N 9.91042°E
- Elevation: 3,610 m (11,840 ft)
- Year built: 1913
- Owner: CAI

Website
- www.rifugi.lombardia.it/en/sondrio/lanzada/hut-marco-e-rosa.html

The Marco e Rosa Hut (Italian: Rifugio Marco e Rosa) is a high mountain refuge located on the southern slopes of the Piz Bernina in Italy. It lies adjacent to the Swiss border. The hut is positioned on the Fourcla Crast' Aguzza and is the highest known mountain hut in Lombardy. It requires mountaineering experience to reach it safely. Its location on the southern ridge (Spallagrat) of the Piz Bernina makes it an important staging post in ascending that mountain.

The hut has wardens in summer and offers basic restaurant services. During the winter season the hut is unlocked but is not staffed.

== Access ==
From the Swiss side, the Marco e Rosa hut can be accessed in approximately 6 hours. The hut is about 5 hours away from the Boval Hut and the Diavolezza Hut. The route passes through the Fortezza Ridge and continues on a lengthy traverse along the glacier terrace below (known as the Bellavista Terrace). This route is graded PD-.

From the Italian side of the country, the Marco e Rosa hut can be reached in approximately 3.5 hours from the Marinelli Hut (2,813 m). The route follows the Upper Scerscen Glacier, a snow couloir, ending with a 200-meter climb up a steep rock buttress fixed with metal cables. The road is exposed to falling stones in the summer and for this reason it is rarely used during that period.

=== Routes, ===
The hut provides a starting point for an ascent of nearby mountains, including: Piz Bernina (4.049m), Piz Palü (3.905m), Piz Zuppo (3.995m), Piz Argient (3.945m), Bellavista (3.889m), Piz Scerscen (3.971m), Piz Roseg (3.937m) and Cresta Guzza (3.854m)

== History ==
The Marco e Rosa Hut was constructed in 1913 on the instigation of alpinist Alfredo Corti. The costs were met by Italian philanthropist and naturalist, Marco De Marchi and because of this gesture, the hut was named after him and his wife, Rosa De Marchi. De Marchi had climbed the Bernina along with a guide, but had been caught in a heavy storm. The hut was a built on a 300m rock promontory, and was a simple structure, capable of sheltering 32 people, but lacked cooking facilities. In the mid-1960s, a second hut was constructed nearby, capable of accommodating 50 people. This second hut is open and staffed from July to September.

In 2017 an organized crowdfunding appeal attempted to raise over €40,000 for new photo-voltaic panels to provide power for the hut.
