= Ruben Sommaruga =

Uruguayan/Austrian Scientist

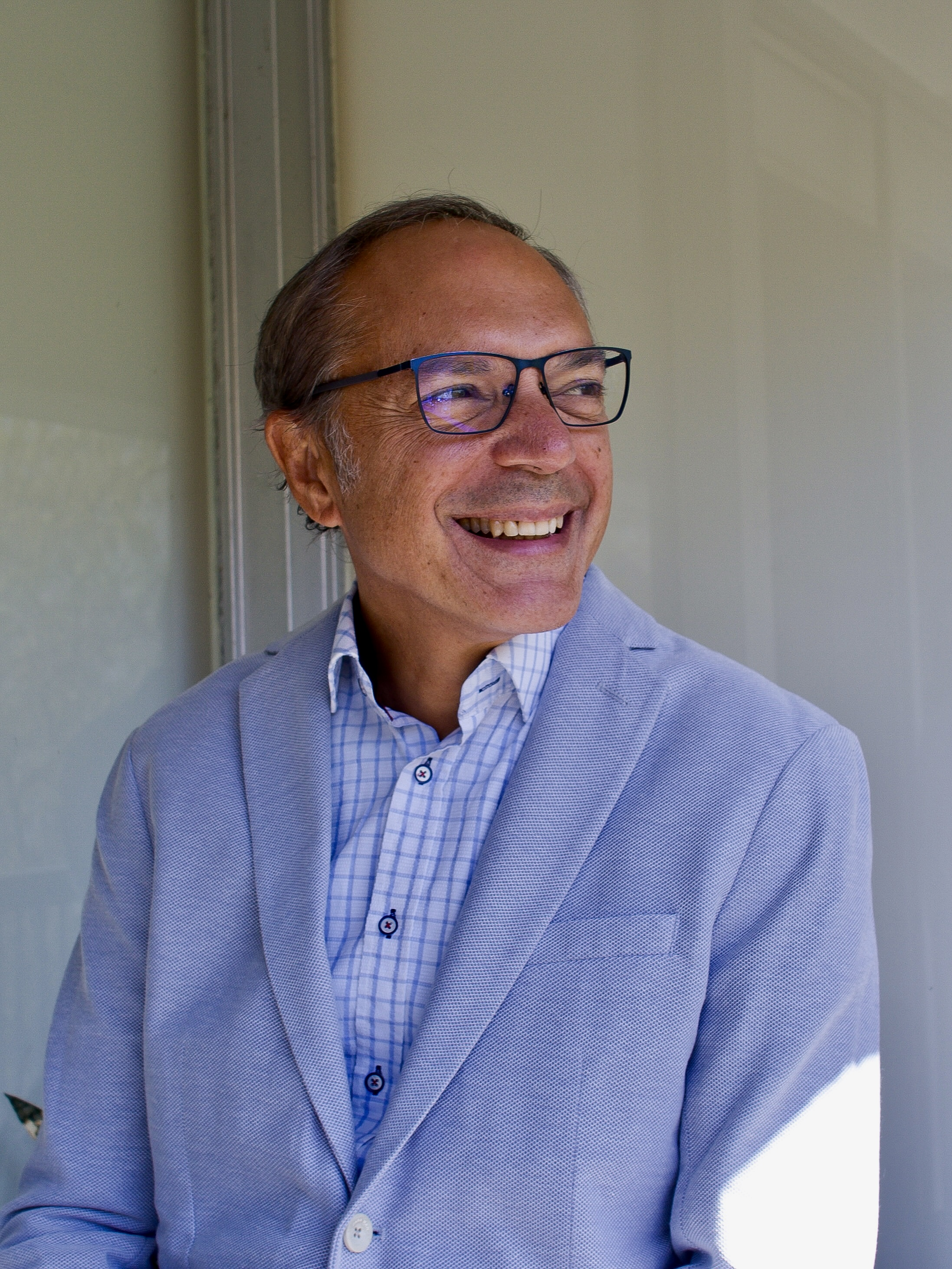
- Born: 27 April 1962 (age 64); Montevideo, Uruguay
- Occupation: Professor
- Awards: Baldi Memorial Award, SIL (2024); Professional Excellence in Limnetic Ecology Prize (2000)

Academic background
- Education: University of the Republic of Uruguay (BSc); University of Innsbruck (MSc and PhD)
- Alma mater: University of Innsbruck

Academic work
- Discipline: Ecology
- Sub-discipline: Limnology, Microbial Ecology, Biogeochemistry, Global Change
- Institutions: University of Innsbruck

Ruben Sommaruga (born 1962) is an Uruguayan-Austrian limnologist and University Full Professor at the Institute of Ecology at the University of Innsbruck, Austria, where he served as director from 2012 to 2020.

== Early life and education ==
Ruben Sommaruga was born in Montevideo, Uruguay, where he received his early education. He attended the University of the Republic in Uruguay, earning a bachelor's degree in Biological Oceanography. He then moved to Austria for postgraduate studies where he obtained a master's degree in Zoology and in 1993 a doctorate in Natural Sciences from the University of Innsbruck, with majors in Limnology and Microbial Ecology.

Subsequently, he held postdoctoral stays at various institutions, including the Institute for Ecological Sciences at the University of Chile, the High Mountain Research Center in Spain, the Istituto di Idrobiologia Pallanza in Italy, and the former Institute of Zoology and Limnology at the University of Innsbruck. In 1998, he habilitated in Limnology at the University of Innsbruck.

Sommaruga has been a visiting scientist at several institutes, such as the Scripps Institution of Oceanography's biological research laboratory, the EAWAG Hydrobiology Laboratory in Kastanienbaum, and the National Center of Polar and Ocean Research in Goa. He has participated in multiple scientific expeditions, including to Nepal (Himalaya), Ethiopia (Bale Mountains National Park) and Greenland (Jakobshavn Glacier).

== Career ==
Sommaruga began his research career studying hypertrophic lakes and coastal lagoons, but later shifted his focus to high mountain or alpine lakes. While his studies primarily concentrated on lakes in the Alps, they also encompassed ecosystems beyond the traditional "northern temperate science belt," including those in the Andes (Chile), the Himalayas (Nepal and India), and the Bale Mountains (Ethiopia).

Over the past three decades, his long-term research goals have aimed to understand how organisms adapt to the harsh environmental conditions typical of high mountain ecosystems and how lake processes are influenced by various global changes. He has studied the ecology of high mountain lakes including those affected by glacier retreat, combining methods from limnology, microbiology, ecology, and environmental science to analyze complex ecological interactions. His research covers a broad spectrum of topics, from microbial ecology and the effects of climate change on aquatic ecosystems to physical limnology and photobiology. These studies have led to over 170 international scientific contributions, including publications in Nature and PNAS.

== Honors and awards ==
- 2026: Official admission as a corresponding member of the Academy of Mathematical, Physical, Chemical and Natural Sciences of Granada
- 2026: Scientific Award for Exceptional Research Achievements, University of Innsbruck [21]
- 2025: Doctor Honoris Causa, University of Uruguay, Faculty of Sciences.
- 2024: Recipient of the Baldi Memorial Award from the International Society of Limnology.
- Since 2020, ranked among the top 2% of scientists worldwide in the Stanford University-Elsevier science ranking (Rank in the Sub-field of Marine Biology and Hydrobiology: 318, AD Scientific Index ID: 1399907) and among the top 10% globally in Ecology and Evolution.
- 2022: Elected Member of the European Academy of Sciences for outstanding contributions to science and technology.
- 2017: Elected Fellow of the Association for the Sciences of Limnology and Oceanography (ASLO).
- 2011–2014: Member of the Faculty of 1000.
- 2008–2020: Member of the Scientific Board of the Austrian Science Fund (FWF).
- 2007: Scientific Award from the Principality of Liechtenstein.
- 2000: International Recognition of Professional Excellence in Limnetic Ecology from the International Ecology Institute (ECI), Germany.
- 1991,1992: Tonolli Award from the Societas Internationalis Limnologiae (International Society of Limnology, SIL).
