= Piz Bernina =

Highest mountain in the Eastern Alps

- Piz Bernina (Romansh); Pizzo Bernina (Italian)
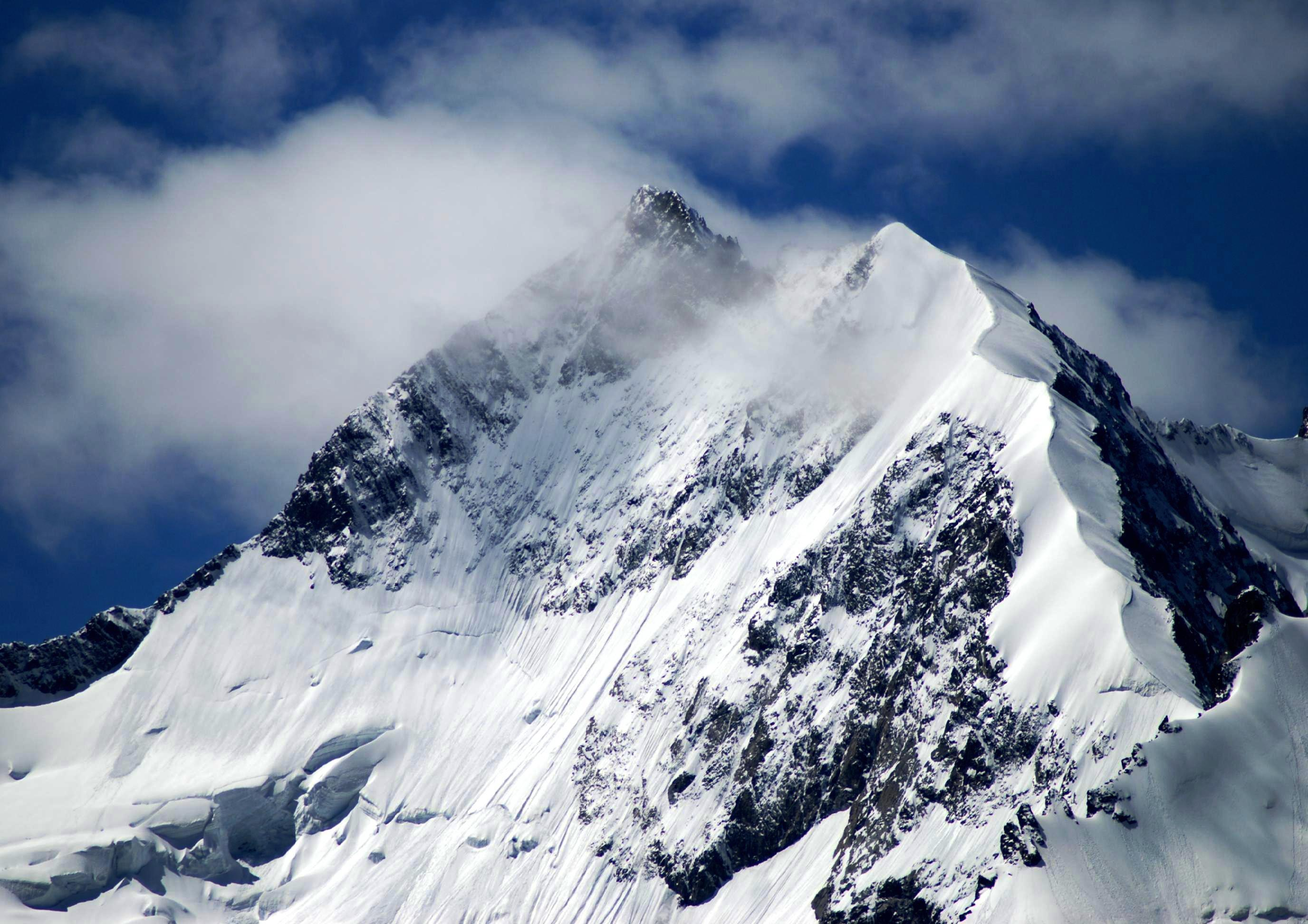
- Piz Bernina with the Biancograt to the right

Highest point
- Elevation: 4,048 m (13,281 ft)
- Prominence: 2,236 m (7,336 ft); Ranked 5th in the Alps
- Parent peak: Mont Blanc
- Isolation: 138 km (86 mi)
- Listing: Canton high point Ultra
- Coordinates: 46°22′56″N 9°54′29″E

Naming
- Language of name: Romansh

Geography
- Location within Alps Location within Switzerland Location within Italy
- Location: Grisons, Switzerland (massif partially in Italy)
- Parent range: Bernina
- Topo map: Swisstopo 1277 Piz Bernina

Climbing
- First ascent: 13 September 1850 by Johann Coaz guided by Jon and Lorenz Ragut Tscharner
- Easiest route: rock/ice climb

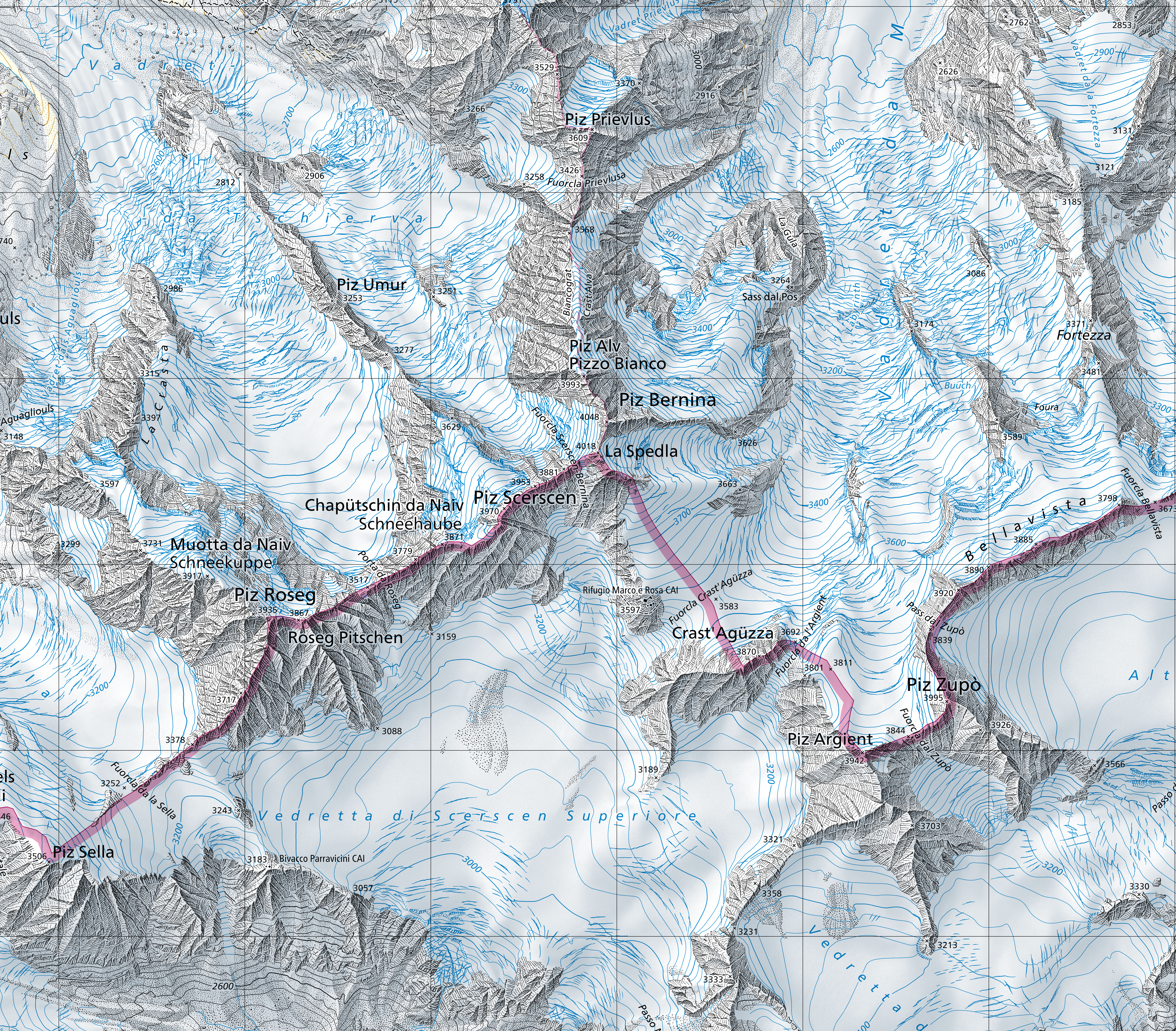
Piz Bernina on the Swisstopo map of the same name

Piz Bernina (from Romansh; Italian: Pizzo Bernina, Italian pronunciation: [ˈpittso berˈniːna]) is the highest mountain in the Eastern Alps, the highest point of the Bernina Range, and the highest peak in the Rhaetian Alps. It rises 4,048 m (13,281 ft) and is located south of Pontresina in the Bernina Region and near the major Alpine resort of St. Moritz, in the Engadin valley. It is also the most easterly mountain higher than 4,000 m (13,000 ft) in the Alps, the highest point of the Swiss canton of Grisons, and the fifth-most prominent peak in the Alps. Although the summit lies within Switzerland, the massif is on the border with Italy. The "shoulder" (4,020 m (13,190 ft)) known as La Spedla is the highest point in the Italian Lombardy region.

Piz Bernina is entirely surrounded by glaciers, of which the largest is the Morteratsch Glacier.

The mountain was named after the Bernina Pass in 1850 by Johann Coaz, who also made the first ascent. The prefix Piz (cognate with peak) comes from the Romansh language of the Grisons; any mountain with that name can be readily identified as being located in southeastern Switzerland.

== Geography ==
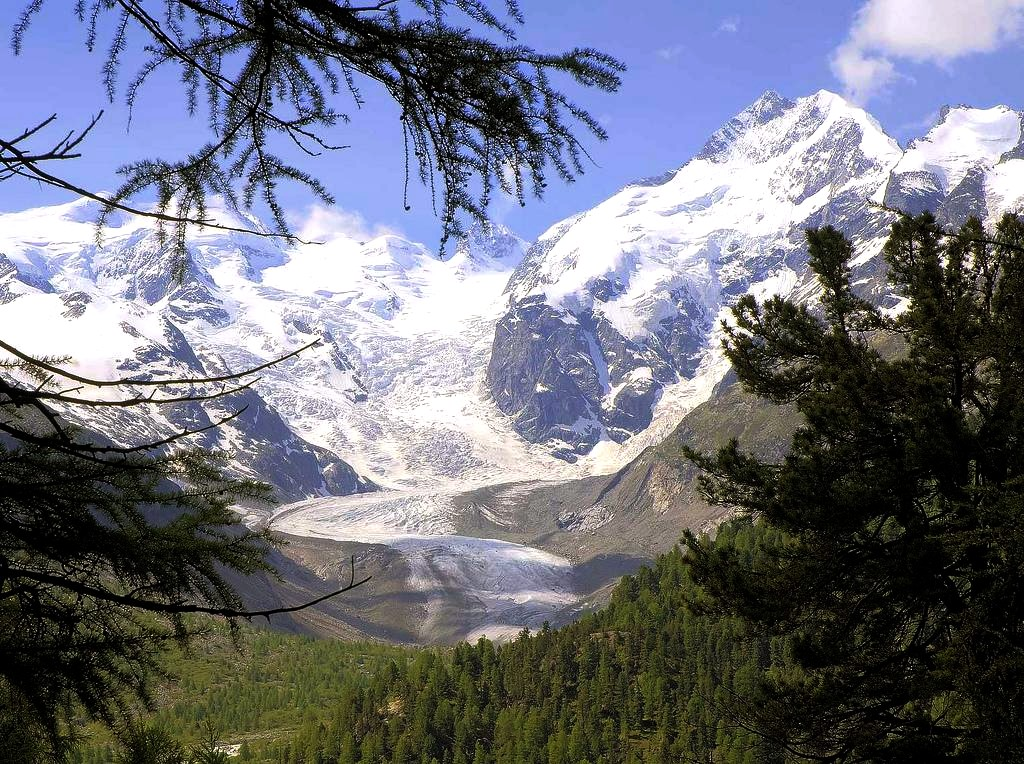
Piz Bernina and the Morteratsch Glacier

Piz Bernina is one of the few isolated Alpine four-thousanders and the most topographically isolated mountain of Switzerland. It is the culminating point of a group of summits slightly lower than 4,000 m (13,123 ft) mostly lying on the main watershed between Switzerland and Italy (such as Piz Scerscen, Piz Zupò, and Piz Palü). The only other summit higher than 4,000 m (13,000 ft) is La Spedla (the Shoulder), a minor prominence south of the mountain, which is also the highest point on the Italian side of the massif.

The summit itself is located on a perpendicular chain (orientated north–south) starting at La Spedla on the border and finishing at Piz Chalchagn, composed also of Piz Morteratsch and Piz Boval.

Piz Bernina separates two glacial valleys, the Tschierva Glacier on the west and the Morteratsch Glacier on the east. The waters flowing on both sides of the mountain end up in the Inn River running northeast through Engadin. South of Piz Bernina the watershed separates the drainage basins of the Danube (Black Sea) and the Po River (Adriatic Sea). The summit of Piz Bernina is the culminating point of the Danube drainage basin. Politically, it is split between the municipalities of Samedan and Pontresina.

== Geology ==
The rocks composing Piz Bernina are mostly diorites and gabbros. The massif in general is also composed of granites, notable on Piz Corvatsch and Piz Palü. Most of the range belongs to the Austroalpine nappes, a tectonic unit whose rocks come from the Apulian plate, a small continent which broke away from Africa (Gondwana) before the Alpine orogeny. The Austroalpine nappes are common throughout all of the Eastern Alps.

== Climbing history ==
The first ascent was made via the east ridge in 1850 by the 28-year-old topographer Johann Wilhelm Coaz (1822–1918, from S-Chanf) and his assistants, the brothers Jon and Lorenz Ragut Tscharner. On 13 September 1850, shortly after 6 a.m., they left the Bernina Inn (at 2,050 m (6,730 ft)) with their measuring instruments. They traversed the Labyrinth (on the Morteratsch Glacier) and headed to the Fuorcla Crast'Agüzza, a col between the Crast' Agüzza and Piz Bernina. They reached the summit at around 6 p.m.

Johan Coaz wrote in his diary:

"At 6 p.m. we stood on the ardently desired lofty peak. On soil that no human had trodden upon before. On the highest point of the canton at 4052 meters above sea level."

"Serious thoughts took hold of us. Greedy eyes surveyed the land up to the distant horizon, and thousands and thousands of mountain peaks surrounded us, rising as rocks from the glittering sea of ice. We stared amazed and awe-struck across this magnificent mountain world."

In 1866, the south ridge running from La Spedla was climbed by Francis Fox Tuckett and F. A. Y. Brown with guides Christian Almer and F. Andermatten. They started at midnight from the Alpe Foppa on the Italian side, and reached the summit at 11 a.m., descending to Pontresina only a few hours later.

The first attempt to climb the northern ridge, the Biancograt, was made on 12 August 1876 by Henri Cordier and Thomas Middlemore with guides Johann Jaun and Kaspar Maurer. They successfully reached the top of the ridge, Piz Alv, but when they saw the chasm lying between them and the summit of Piz Bernina, they considered it to be beyond their powers and returned down the Biancograt. Cordier later declared the gap to be "absolutely impossible".

Exactly two years later, Paul Güssfeldt, accompanied by the guides H. Grass and J. Gross, reached the summit via the Biancograt and accomplished the first complete ascent on this route. The first winter ascent was made on 15 March 1929 by C. Colmus with guides C. and U. Grass. To win a bet worth 200 CHF, Hermann Buhl reached the summit of Piz Bernina from the Boval hut in 6 hours; he then descended the north ridge in only 15 minutes, establishing a record.

== Tourism ==
Piz Bernina is the highest summit of the Engadin region and lies close to the resorts of St. Moritz and Pontresina. The mountain can be seen from different viewpoints with the use of ski-lifts from Diavolezza, Piz Corvatsch or Piz Nair. The Bernina railway connects St. Moritz with the southern Val Poschiavo through the Bernina Pass.

== Climbing routes and huts ==
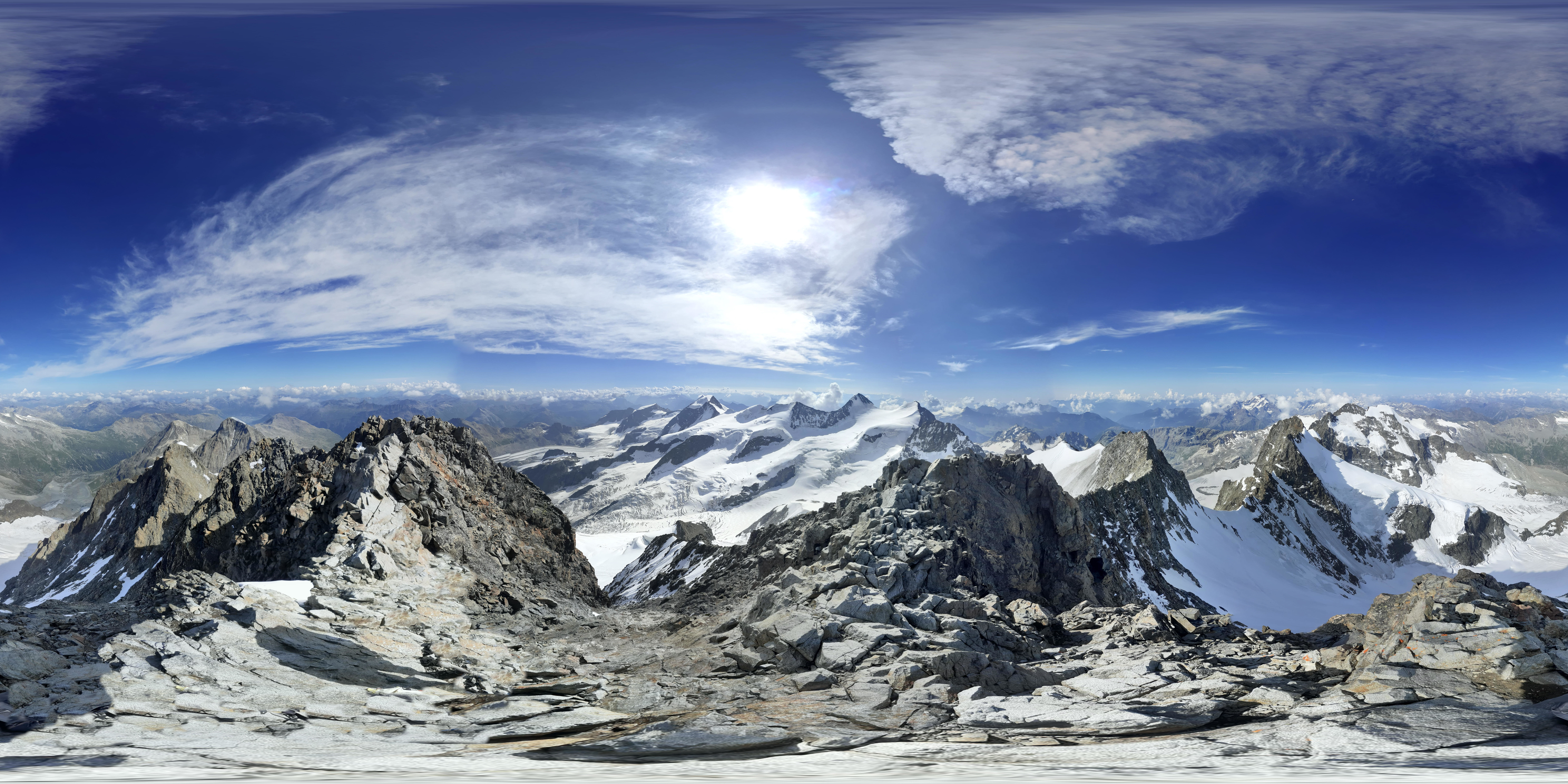
Spherical Panorama from Piz Bernina (view as a 360° interactive panorama)

The normal route starts from the Rifugio Marco e Rosa, located at 3,600 m (11,800 ft) above the Fuorcla Crast'Agüzza, and follows the route taken by the first ascentionists.

The north ridge, called the Biancograt or Crast Alva (both meaning White Ridge), is the most well-known and attractive route to the summit, and is much more difficult than the normal route. The route starts from the Tschierva Hut (2,584 m (8,478 ft)) in Val Roseg, accessible from Pontresina. The Biancograt itself starts at the Fuorcla Prievlusa (3,430 m (11,250 ft)) and leads to Piz Bianco (3,995 m (13,107 ft)). To reach the summit, the Bernina gap – which repulsed Cordier, Middlemore, Jaun and Maurer in 1876 – has to be traversed.

Other huts in the area

- Rifugio Carate Brianza (2,662 m (8,734 ft)) – capacity 32 beds, 3 places in winter room
- Rifugio Marinelli Bombardieri (2,813 m (9,229 ft)) – capacity 220 beds, 15 places in winter room
- Chamanna Boval (2,495 m (8,186 ft)) – capacity 120 beds
- Chamanna da Diavolezza (2,973 m (9,754 ft)) – capacity 234 beds

== Panorama ==
Spherical panorama from Piz Bernina

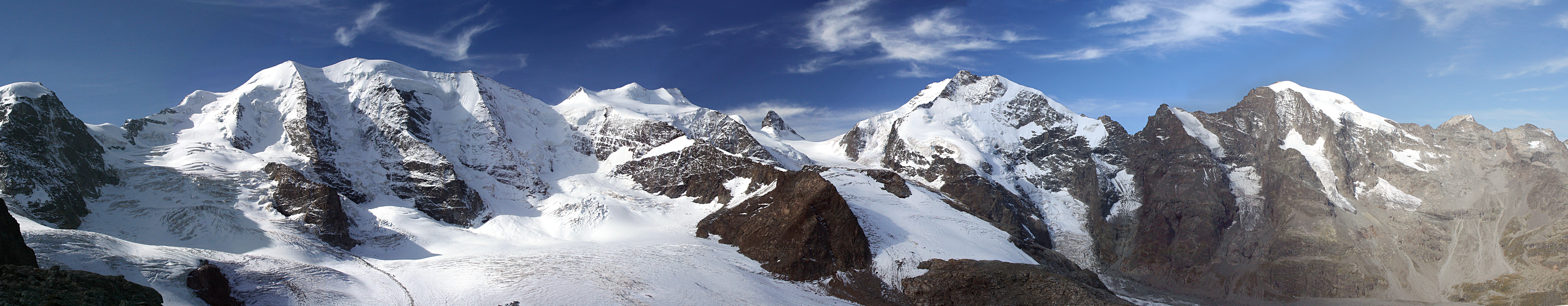
Panorama from Diavolezza. From left to right: Piz Palü, Bellavista, Crast' Agüzza (small rocky peak in the middle), Piz Bernina and Piz Morteratsch

== Deaths on Piz Bernina ==
- 1970: Rollo Davidson and Michael Latham

== See also ==
- Exploration of the High Alps
- List of 4000 metre peaks of the Alps
- List of most isolated mountains of Switzerland

== Gallery ==
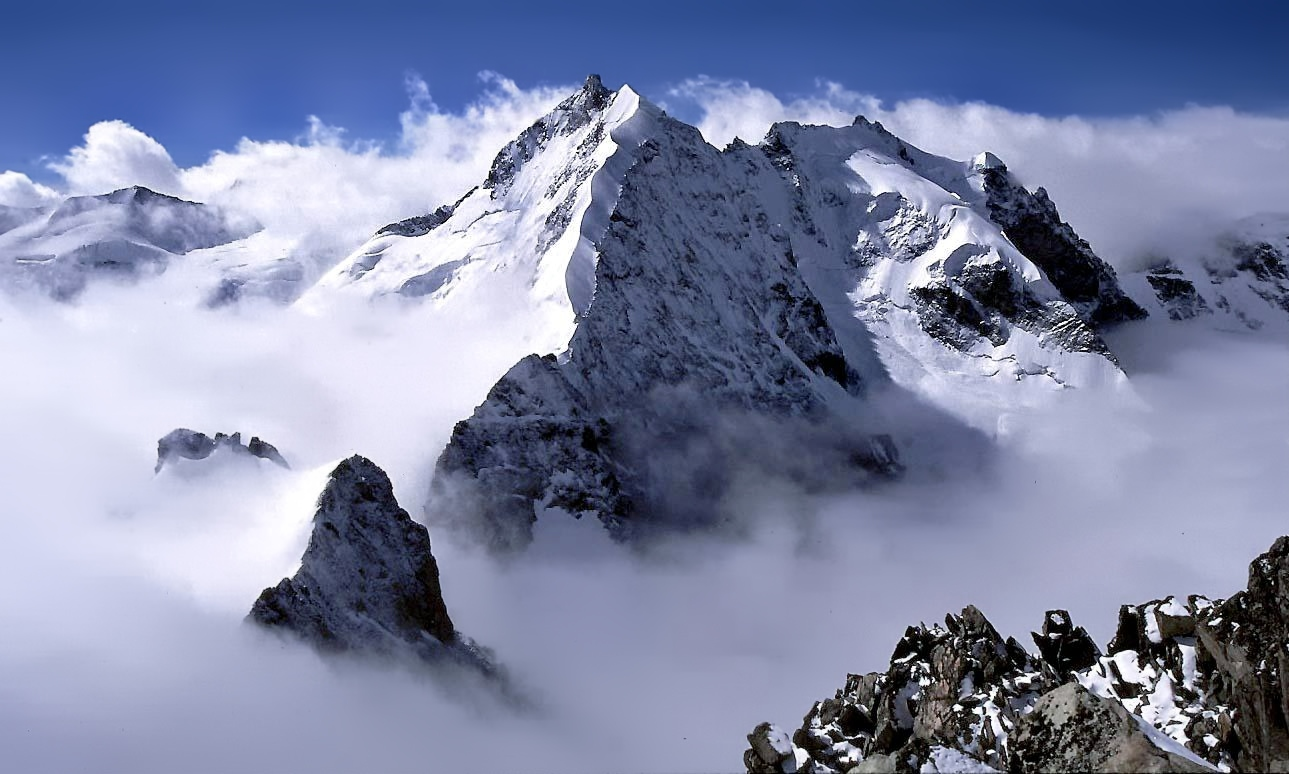
The north ridge (Biancograt)

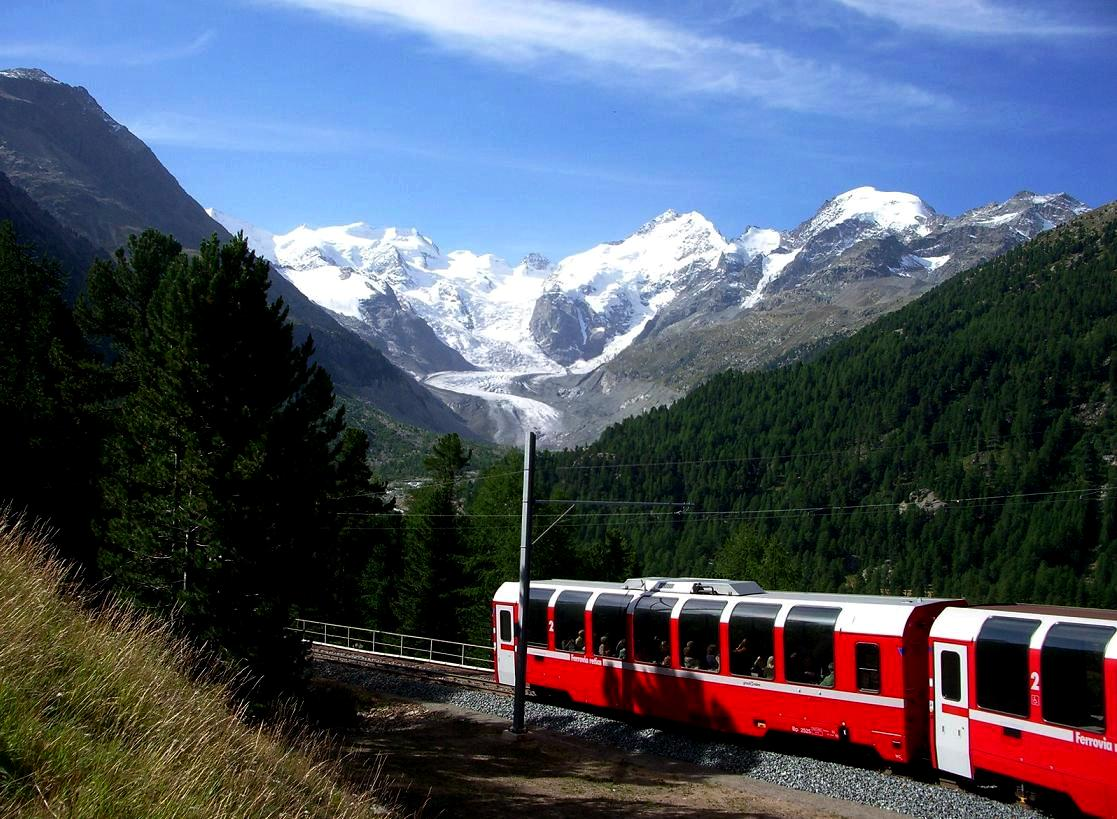
Piz Bernina and the Bernina Express

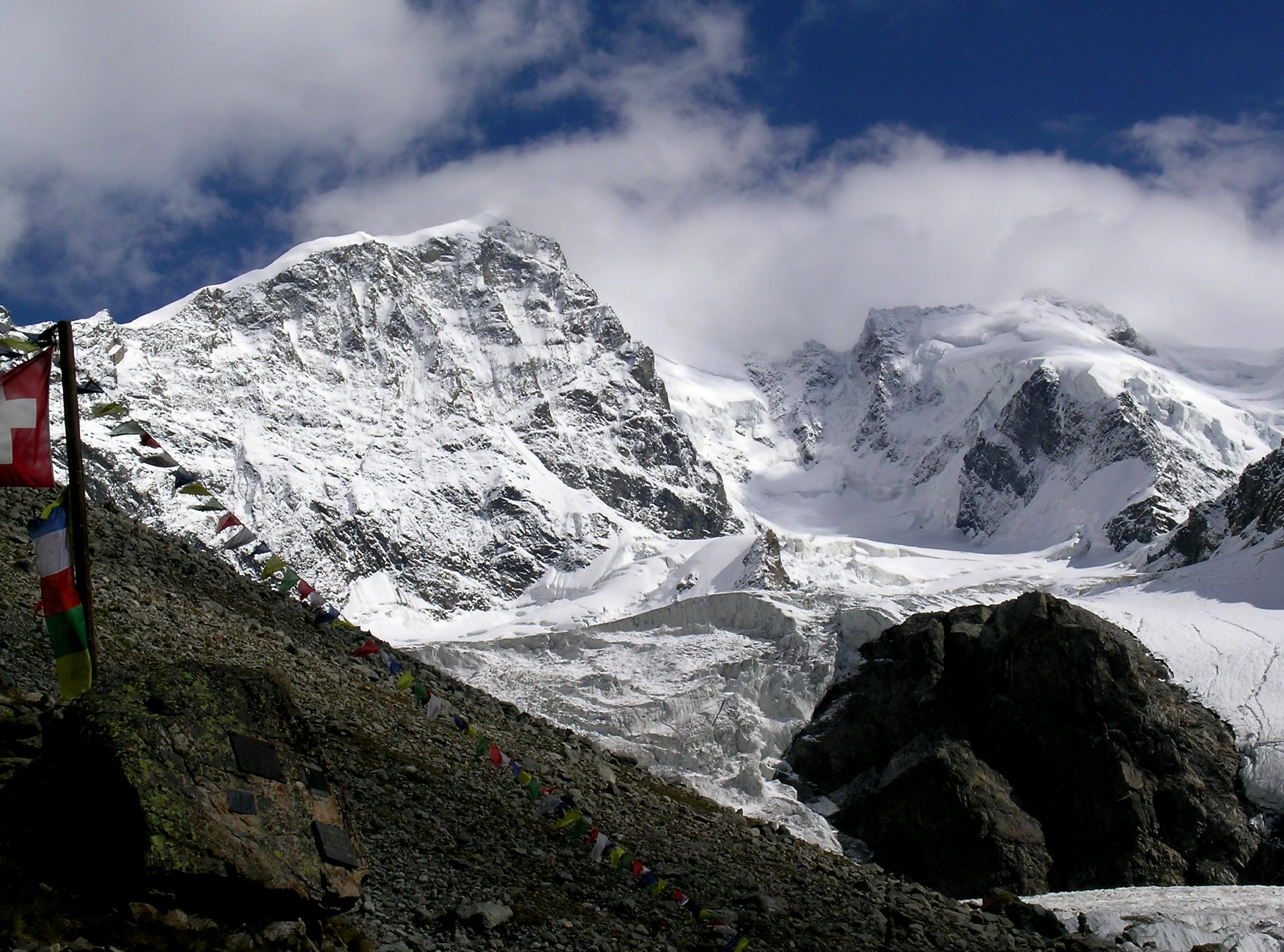
Piz Bernina from the west

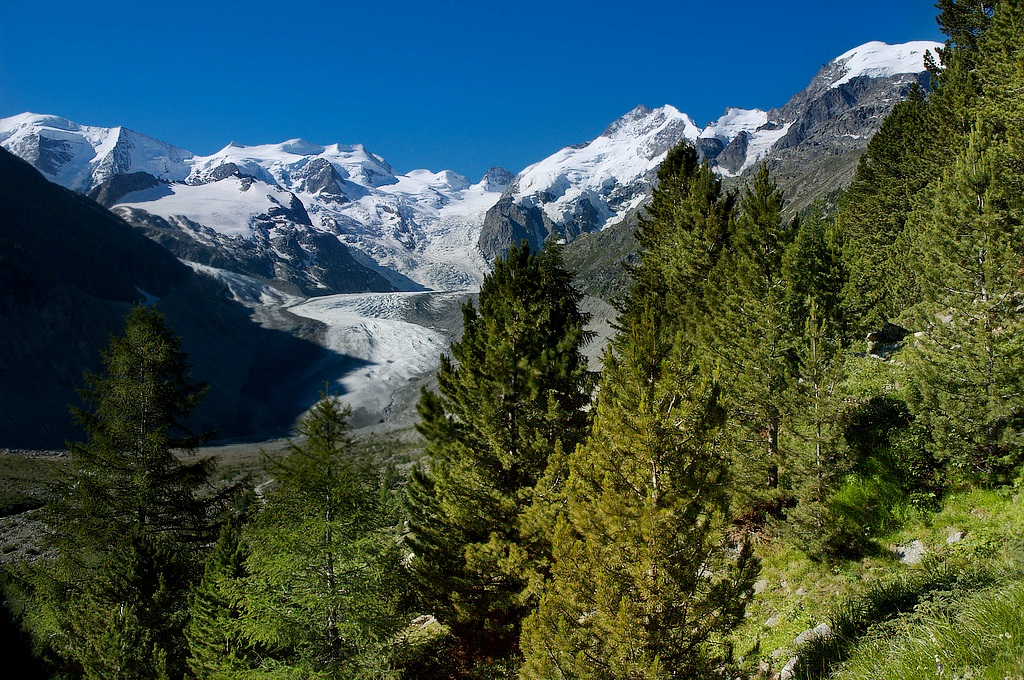
View from the pine and larch woodland above the Morteratsch Glacier

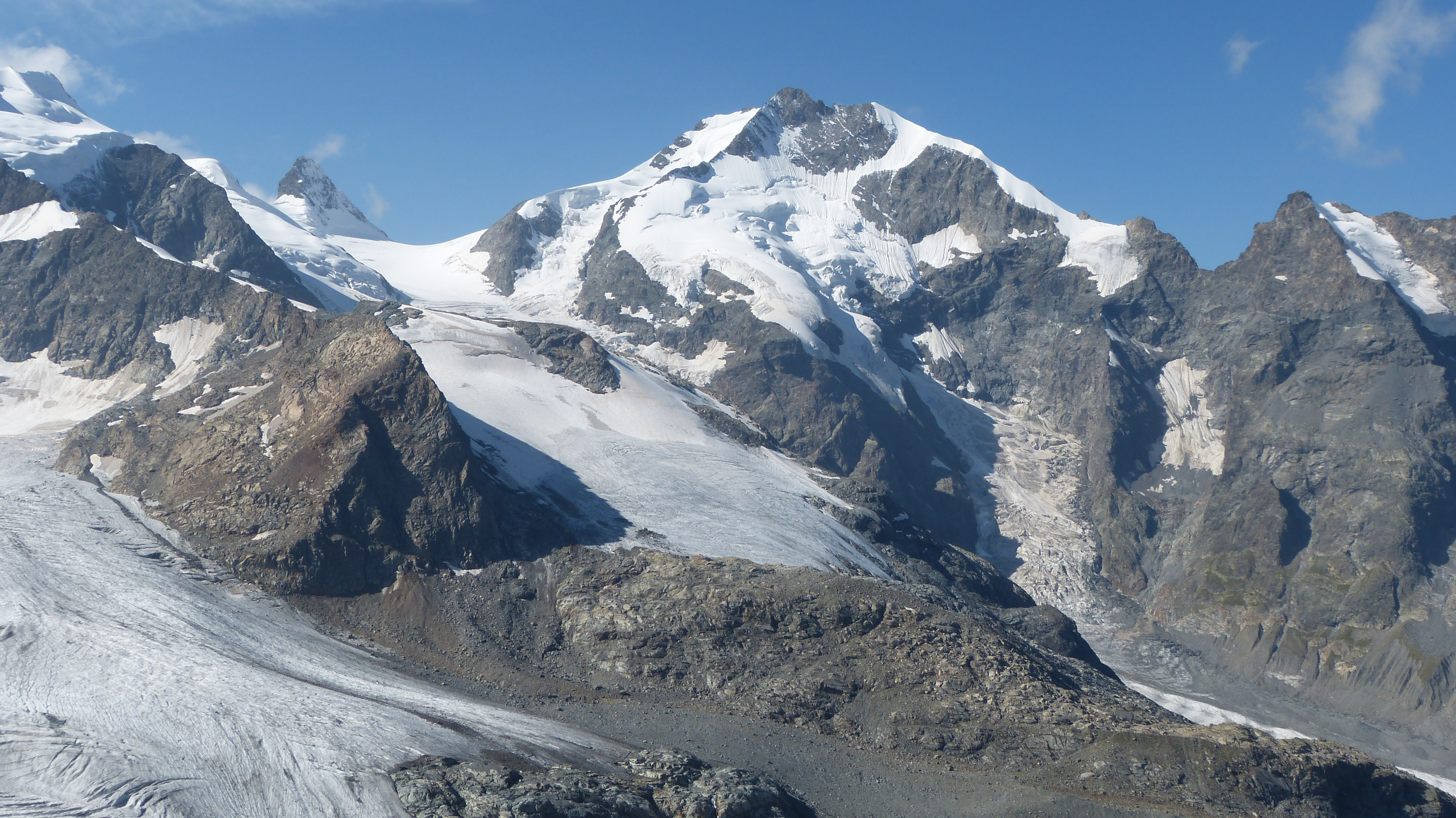
View from Diavolezza
