= Robert Were Fox =

Robert Were Fox may refer to:

- Robert Were Fox the Elder (1754–1818), businessman
- Robert Were Fox the Younger FRS (1789–1877)

== See also ==
- Robert Fox (disambiguation)
