= Munt Pers =

Mountain in Switzerland

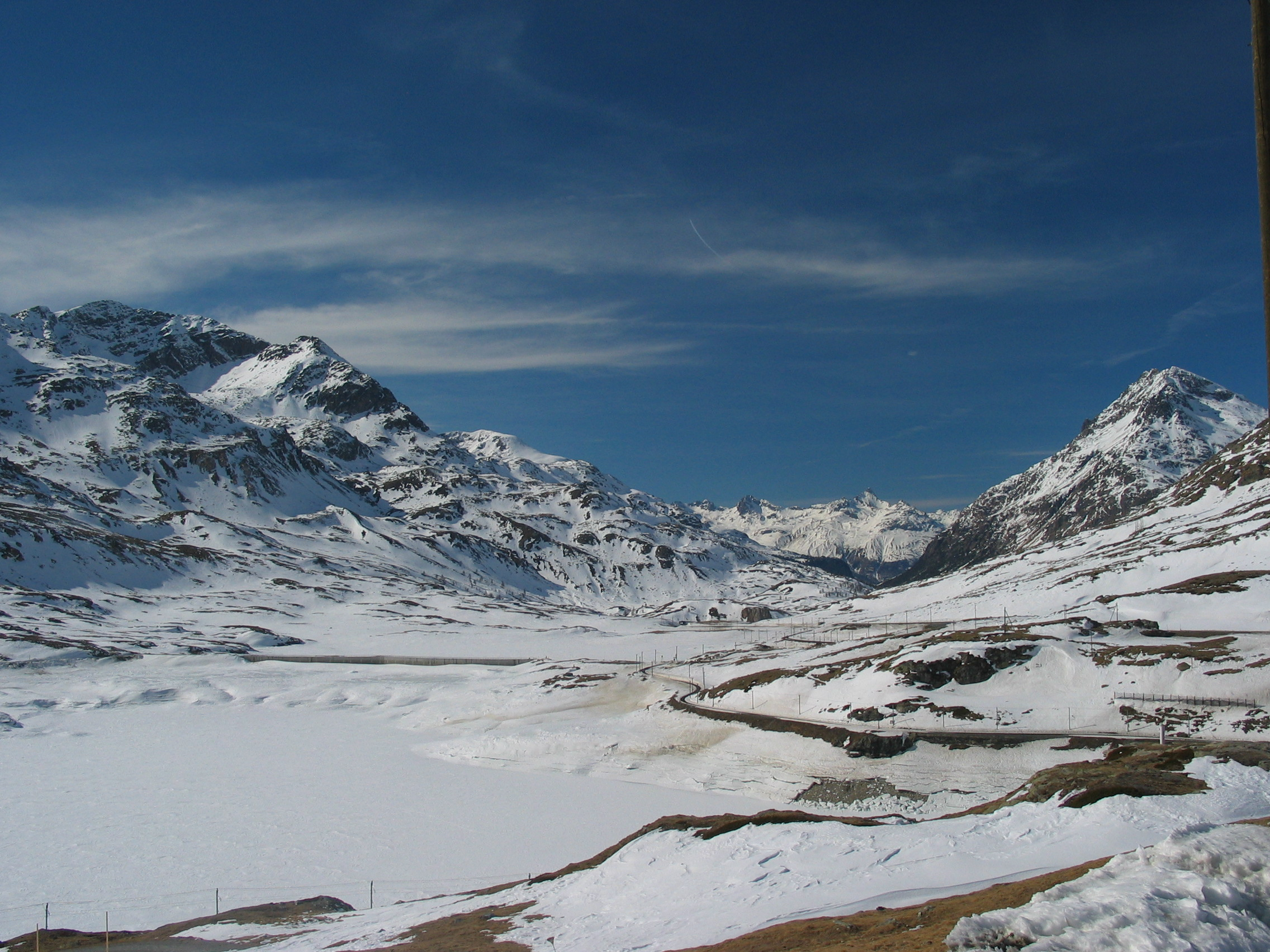
- Munt Pers (left) from the Bernina Pass

Highest point
- Elevation: 3,207 m (10,522 ft)
- Prominence: 242 m (794 ft)
- Parent peak: Piz Bernina
- Coordinates: 46°25′17″N 9°57′13″E

Geography
- Location within Switzerland
- Location: Graubünden, Switzerland
- Parent range: Bernina Range

Munt Pers is a mountain in the Bernina Range of the Alps, overlooking the Morteratsch Glacier in the Swiss canton of Graubünden. It lies north of Diavolezza, from where a trail leads to its summit.
