= Francis Fox Tuckett =

English mountaineer

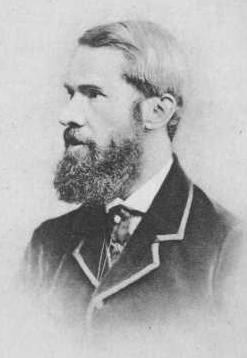
Tuckett in 1868

Francis Fox Tuckett FRGS (10 February 1834 – 20 June 1913) was an English mountaineer. He was vice-president of the Alpine Club from 1866 to 1868, and a Fellow of the Royal Geographical Society.

== Life and family ==
Tuckett was born in 1834 at the Old House, Frenchay Common, near Bristol, the eldest child of Francis and Mariana Tuckett.

His father, Francis Tuckett of Frenchay (1802–1868), was a world traveller as well as a leather merchant, horticulturalist, social reformer, philanthropist and Quaker. Himself the son of Philip Debell Tuckett (1749–1816), Francis Tuckett married Mariana Fox (1807–1863), a daughter of Robert Were Fox the Elder (1754–1818) and a member of the notable Fox family of Falmouth, on 29 March 1833. Francis Tuckett was in Naples when he died in 1868.

Tuckett's grandfather Robert Were Fox the Elder was a Quaker ship broker and business man in Cornwall, while his uncle Robert Were Fox the Younger (1789–1877) was a geologist and natural philosopher who became a Fellow of the Royal Society.

Francis Fox Tuckett was the eldest of five children, and his parents' only son. His eldest sister Elizabeth Fox Tuckett, born in 1835, died young, and his other sisters were a second Elizabeth Fox (1837), followed by Mariana Fox (1839) and Charlotte Fox (1842).

Tuckett entered his father's business as a leather factor and was also a gentleman farmer all of his life, taking two to three months off each year for alpine exploration. In 1882, his business, under the name of 'Tuckett and Rake', was at 18 & 20, Victoria Street, Bristol, and was described as 'Leather, Valonia, and Raw Hide factors'.

On 17 January 1896, at the age of 62, Tuckett married Alice Fox while he was in New Zealand.

He died in 1913 at his birthplace, the Old House, Frenchay Common, and was buried at the Friends' Meeting House in Frenchay.

== Alpinism ==
Tuckett was one of the main figures of the Golden age of alpinism, making the ascent of 269 peaks and the crossing of 687 passes. In Scrambles amongst the Alps Edward Whymper called Tuckett "that mighty mountaineer, whose name is known throughout the length and breadth of the Alps". Geoffrey Winthrop Young called Tuckett's approach to climbing "encyclopaedic".

His first trip to the Alps was in 1842 in the company of his father. They went to Chamonix and he explored the Mer de Glace.

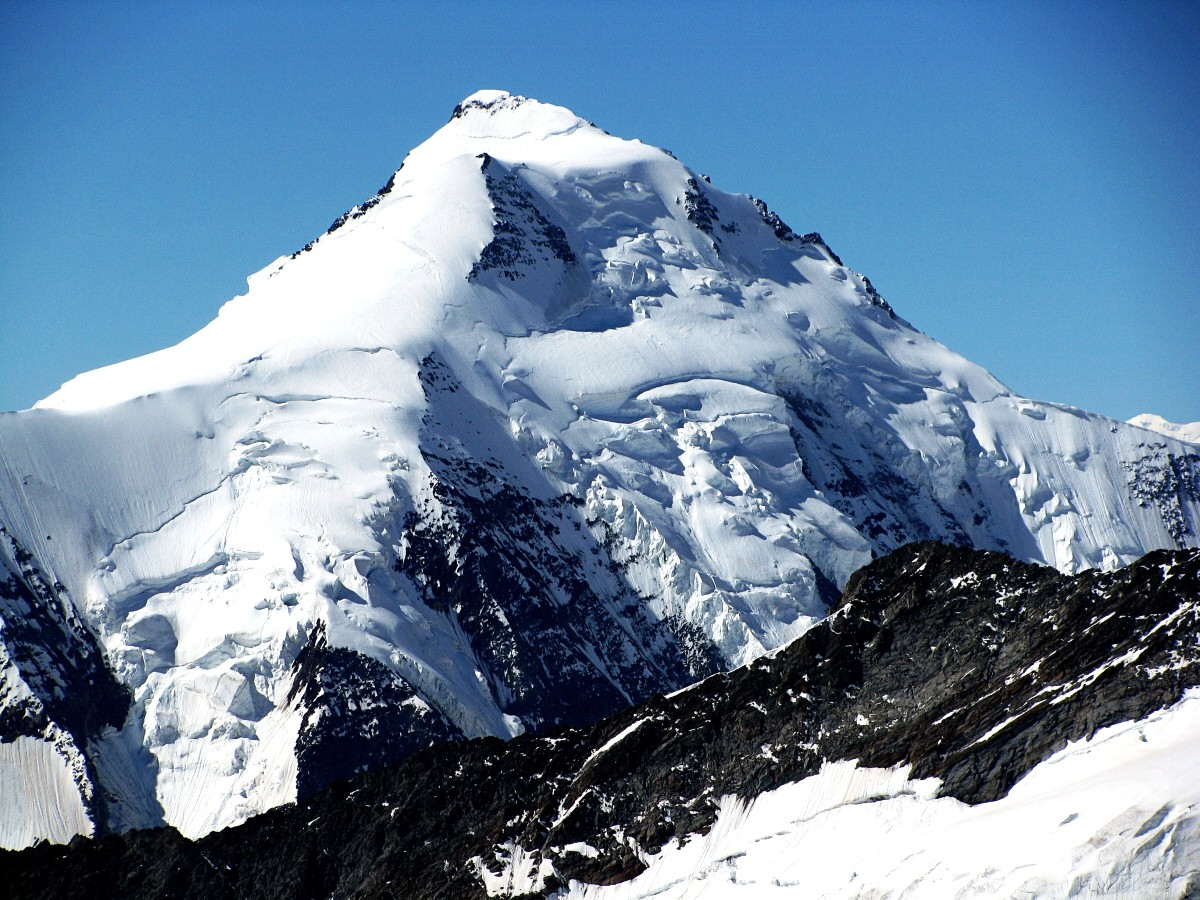
The Aletschhorn from the north

On 18 June 1859 he made the first ascent of the Aletschhorn in the Swiss Alps together with the guides Johann Joseph Bennen, Peter Bohren and V. Tairraz. Here he showed his passion for scientific observation, making barometric calculations during the climb and on the summit in the teeth of a strong gale. Of the scene at the summit he wrote:

The wind of such violence as almost to carry off one's legs, driving snow, and twenty degrees Fahrenheit of frost, are not quite the companions one would select for examination of so vast a landscape . . . but . . . I unhesitatingly maintain that there is a joy in these measurings of the strength of nature in her wildest moods, a quiet sense of work done, in the teeth of the opposition.

—

In 1861, Tuckett tested a prototype Alpine sleeping bag. Within a few years he had perfected a bag design which consisted of blanket material with rubber-coated fabric on the underside.

He pioneered exploration within the Dauphiné Alps in the French Alps, in 1862 making the first crossings of the col des Ecrins, the col du Sélé and the col du Glacier Blanc in the Massif des Écrins with the guides Michel Croz, Peter Perren and Bartolommeo Peyrotte. He also made an attempt, with the same party, on the highest mountain in the range, the unclimbed Barre des Ecrins. In Tuckett's own words:

Arrived on the plateau [of the Glacier de l'Encula] a most striking view of the Ecrins burst upon us, and a hasty inspection encouraged us to hope its ascent would be practicable. On the sides of La Bérade and the Glacier Noir it presents, as has already been stated, the most precipitous and inaccessible face that can be conceived, but in the direction of the Glacier de l'Encula, as the upper part of the Glacier Blanc is named on the French map, the slopes are less rapid, and immense masses of névé and séracs cover it nearly to the summit. The snow was in very bad order, and as we sank at each step above the knee, it soon became evident that our prospects of success were extremely doubtful. A nearer approach, too, disclosed traces of fresh avalanches, and after much deliberation and a careful examination through the telescope, it was decided that the chances in our favour were too small to render it desirable to waste time in the attempt

—

According to Whymper, Tuckett "halted before the Pointe des Ecrins [as the Barre was then called], and, dismayed by its appearance, withdrew his forces to gather less dangerous laurels elsewhere". The expedition did have the benefit, however, of "[throwing] some light on the Ecrins".

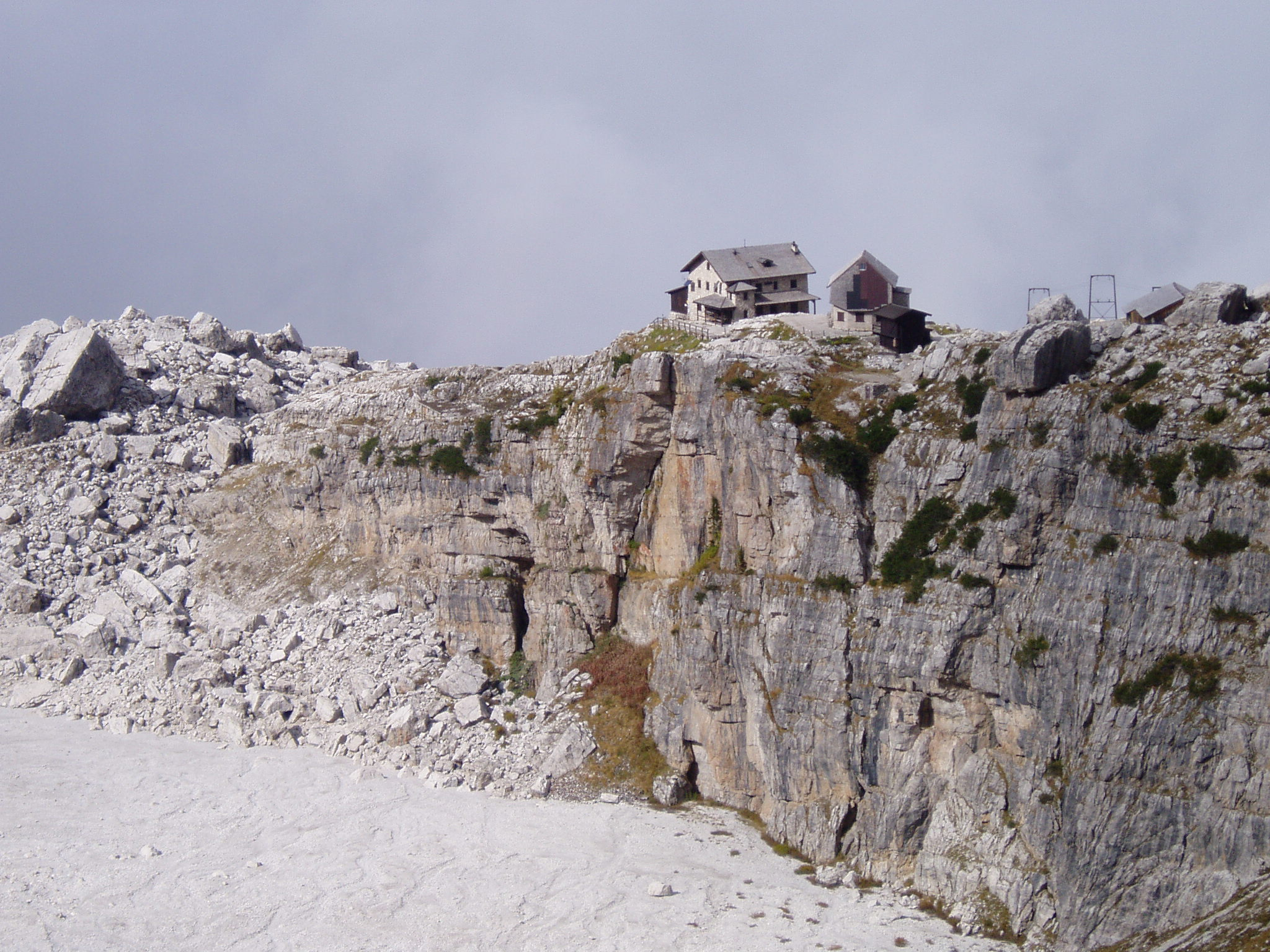
The Rifugio Tuckett

Tuckett was also one of the first alpinists to explore the Dolomites in Italy; in 1865, together with Douglas William Freshfield, he traversed the Pale di San Martino group in eastern Trentino, crossing the San Martino Dolomites for the first time, a feat which astonished the mountaineering world as they had no maps and little equipment, relying on skill and intuition. In Trentino, the names of Tuckett, Freshfield, John Ball, and Edward Robson Whitwell are remembered as the pioneers who put the Dolomites on the map. In 1871, in the Brenta Dolomites, Tuckett, with Freshfield and guide Devouassou climbed the Cima Brenta (3,150 m) via the Vedretta di Brenta Superiore on the west side; at the time this peak was thought to be the highest summit in the range. The Rifugio Tuckett above Madonna di Campiglio, situated at an altitude of 2,272 metres in the Brenta Dolomites, is named after him, as is the Bocca del Tuckett (2,648 m), a pass between two steep, rocky peaks that may be seen from the hut.

In the Bernina Range in Italy and Switzerland, Tuckett and E. N. Buxton made the first crossing of the Fuorcla dal Zupò, the "fairly difficult" pass between Piz Zupò and Piz Argient, together with guides Peter Jenny, Christian Michel and Franz Biner on 28 July 1864; on the same day, with the same party, he made the first crossing of the Fuorcla Crast' Agüzza. In the same range Tuckett and F. A. Y. Brown made the first ascent of the south ridge (or Spallagrat) of Piz Bernina together with guides Christian Almer and Franz Andermatten on 23 June 1866. This is today the normal route up the mountain.

His sister Charlotte wrote that "He kept himself in good training for his beloved pursuit of mountaineering by his daily walks to and from Bristol, five miles each way. He used to get home for six and for more years than I can say, the institution existed of an apple tart served with his tea".

Another sister, Elizabeth, who was a traveller, writer and artist in her own right, illustrated her Alpine Journal with sketches. One is of the first ascent of the Cimon della Pala by Edward Robson Whitwell in 1870.

== Collector and antiquarian ==
A Fellow of the Royal Geographical Society and a member of the British Association for the Advancement of Science, on his travels Tuckett built up a collection of objects which by 1917 had been donated to the Pitt Rivers Museum at Oxford.

As a member of the Clifton Antiquarian Club, Tuckett published antiquarian papers in its Proceedings, including Notes of ancient Norwegian wooden churches (1888) and Notes on ancient Egyptian methods of hewing, dressing, sculpturing and polishing stone (1889).

== Author ==
Tuckett's A Pioneer in the High Alps: Alpine Diaries and Letters of F. F. Tuckett, 1856–1874 was published posthumously in 1920.

== Honours ==
- Knight of the Order of Saints Maurice and Lazarus, 1865, appointed by King Victor Emmanuel II of Italy for geographical and scientific work in the Italian Alps
