= Diavolezza =

Col in Graubünden, Switzerland

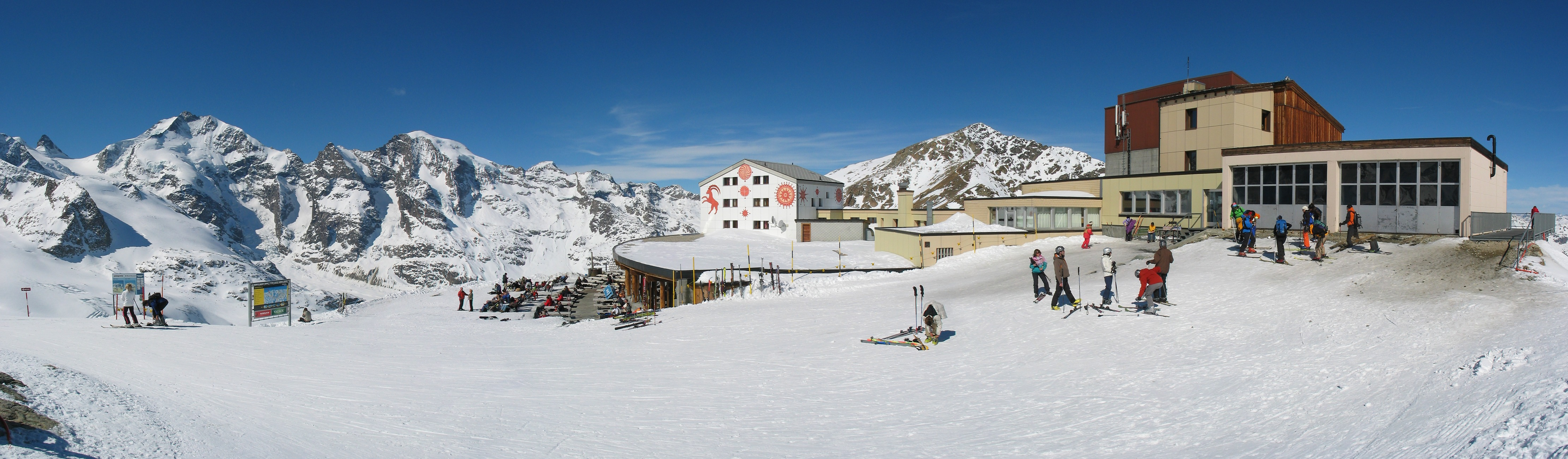

Highest point
- Elevation: 2,973 m (9,754 ft)
- Parent peak: Munt Pers
- Listing: List of mountains of Switzerland
- Coordinates: 46°24′38.110″N 9°58′1.711″E

Naming
- English translation: female devil
- Language of name: Italian

Geography
- Location within Switzerland
- Country: Switzerland
- Canton: Grisons
- Parent range: Rhaetian Alps
- Topo map: Swiss Federal Office for Topography – swisstopo

Geology
- Mountain type: Viewpoint

The Diavolezza is a col and ski resort above the Val Bernina in Graubünden. The col has an altitude of 2,958 metres (9,705 ft) and is located between Munt Pers (northwest, 3,207 metres (10,522 ft)) and Piz Trovat (southeast, 3,146 metres (10,322 ft)).

From Diavolezza one can see the highest peaks of the Eastern Alps, including the Piz Bernina, and the Pers Glacier, a tributary of the Morteratsch Glacier.

== Tourism ==
The mountain can be reached by cable car from Val Bernina, the Bernina Pass valley. At the base station of the cable car on 2,096 metres (6,877 ft) there is the Bernina Diavolezza railway station on the Bernina Line of the Rhaetian Railway (RhB)). At the top station on 2,978 metres (9,770 ft), there is a restaurant with a panoramic terrace, as well as a hotel offering both hotel-class and bunk-style accommodations.

The Diavolezza is one of the ski areas of the Upper Engadine (from 1,896 m to 3,066 m). The skiing area is connected to that of Piz Lagalb, which lies on the opposite side of the valley. The two areas are usually promoted as one, called Diavolezza-Lagalb. The Diavolezza-Lagalb area is known for its difficult slopes, all red and black, as well as the good snow conditions lasting often as long as May. Especially popular is the difficult 10 kilometres (6.2 mi) slope down the Morteratsch Glacier to the Morteratsch railway station (the slope on the glacier is marked and secured).

Each month at full moon, there is moonlight skiing in the evening.

== Panorama ==
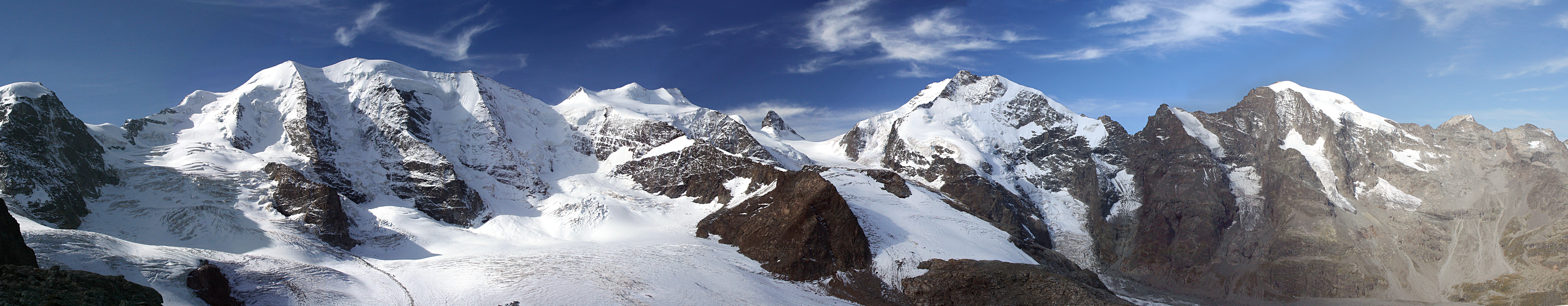
Panorama from Diavolezza. From left to right: Piz Palü, Bellavista, Crast' Agüzza (small rocky peak in the middle), Piz Bernina and Piz Morteratsch
