= Piz Boval =

Mountain in Switzerland

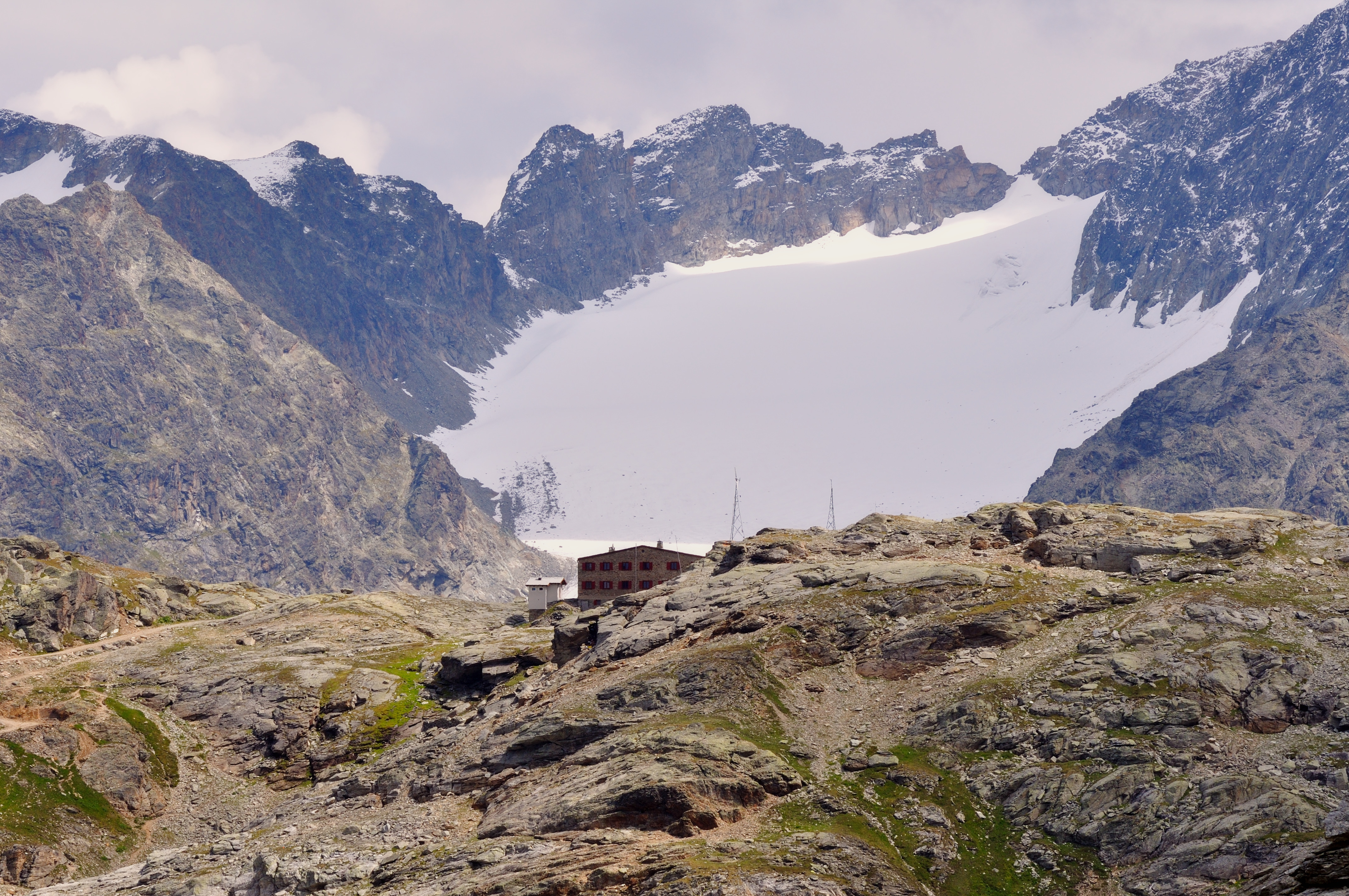
- Piz Boval (central summit) and the Vadret da Misaun glacier from the west

Highest point
- Elevation: 3,353 m (11,001 ft)
- Prominence: 53 m (174 ft)
- Parent peak: Piz Bernina
- Coordinates: 46°25′1.9″N 9°54′8.7″E

Geography
- Location within Switzerland
- Location: Graubünden, Switzerland
- Parent range: Bernina Range

Piz Boval is a mountain of the Bernina Range, located north of Piz Bernina in the Swiss canton of Graubünden. It lies on the ridge that separate the Val Roseg (west) from the valley of the Morteratsch Glacier (east).
