= Bob Fox =

Bob Fox may refer to:

- Bob Fox (footballer) (born 1953), Australian rules footballer
- Bob Fox (musician) (born 1953), English folk guitarist and singer
- Bob Fox (architect) (born 1941), American architect

== See also ==
- Bob Foxx (1917–1975), American football player
- Robert Fox (disambiguation)
