= Sommaruga =

Sommaruga is a surname. Notable people with the surname include:

- Cornelio Sommaruga (born 1932), Swiss humanitarian, lawyer, and diplomat
- Giuseppe Sommaruga (1867–1917), Italian architect of the Art nouveau movement
- Simonetta Sommaruga (born 1960), Swiss politician, distant relative of Cornelio
- Ruben Sommaruga (born 1962), Uruguayan/Austrian scientist
