= Tonolli =

Tonolli is a surname. Notable people with the surname include:

- Alessandro Tonolli (born 1974), Italian basketball player
- Livia Pirocchi Tonolli (1909–1985), Italian freshwater biologist
