= Piz Chalchagn =

Mountain in Switzerland

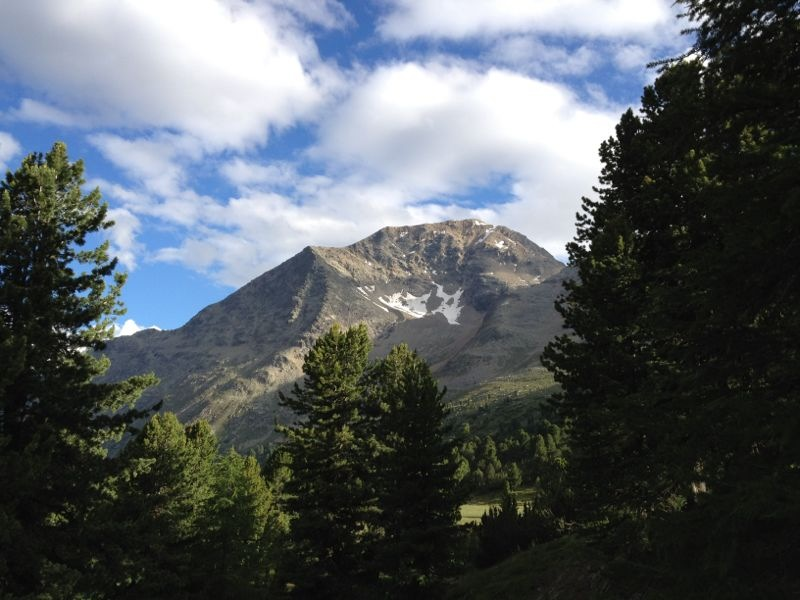
- View from the north side

Highest point
- Elevation: 3,154 m (10,348 ft)
- Prominence: 192 m (630 ft)
- Parent peak: Piz Bernina
- Coordinates: 46°27′4.8″N 9°54′21.2″E

Geography
- Location within Switzerland
- Location: Graubünden, Switzerland
- Parent range: Bernina Range

Piz Chalchagn (3,154 m) is a mountain in the Bernina Range of the Alps, located south of Pontresina in the canton of Graubünden. It lies at the northern end of the range north of La Spedla and culminating at Piz Bernina.
