= Piz Argient =

Mountain in Switzerland

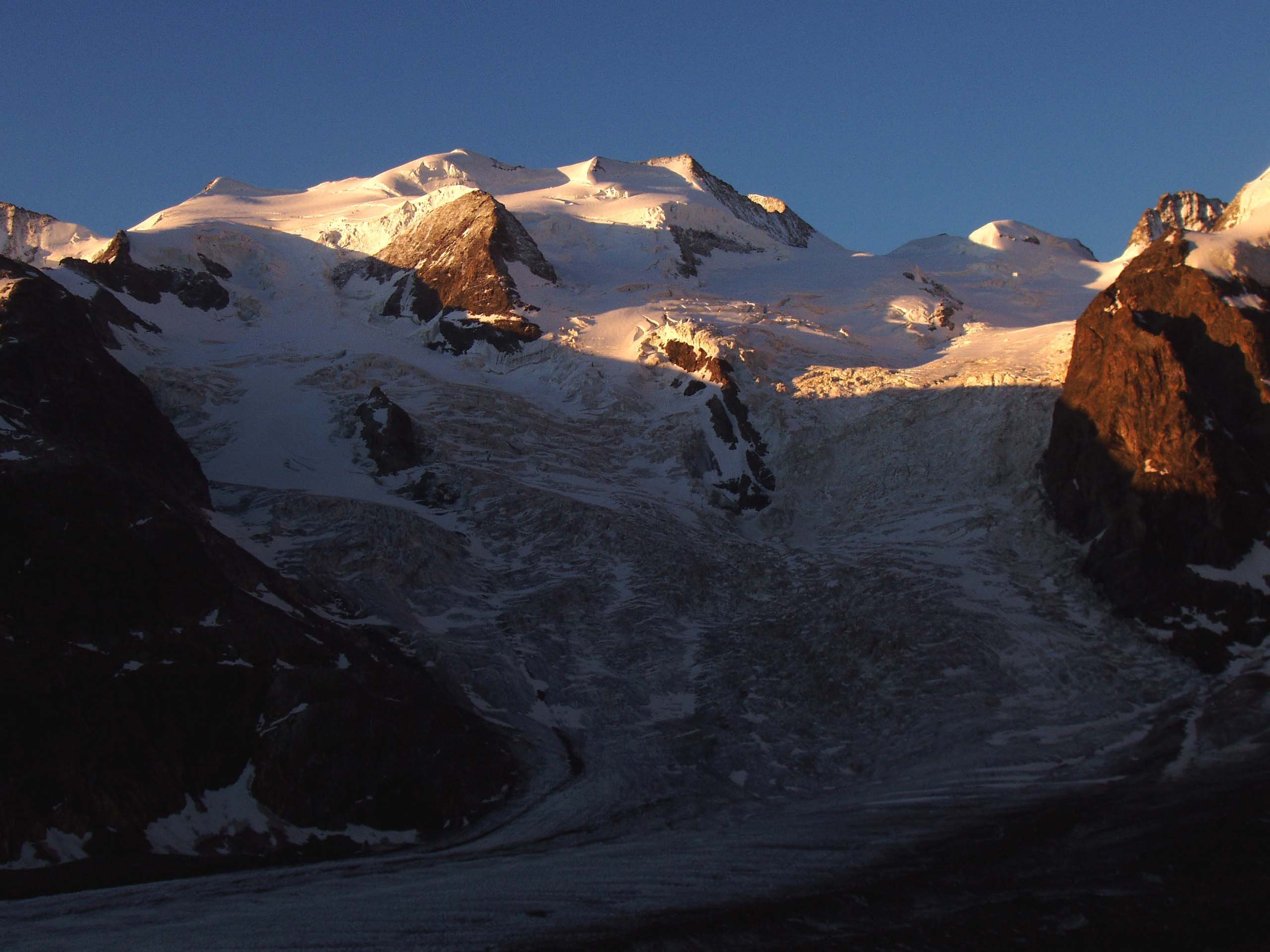
- Bellavista (left and centre), Piz Argient (snowy dome, right) and Crast' Agüzza (rocky peak, extreme right)

Highest point
- Elevation: 3,943 m (12,936 ft)
- Prominence: 99 m (325 ft)
- Parent peak: Piz Zupò
- Listing: Mountains of Italy; Highest mountains of Switzerland
- Coordinates: 46°21′57.28″N 9°55′30.9″E

Naming
- English translation: Silver peak

Geography
- Location within Alps
- Countries: Italy and Switzerland
- Parent range: Bernina Range

Geology
- Mountain type: Granite

Climbing
- First ascent: 1869 by Seiler and von Seldeneck, with guides Christian Grass, J. B. Walther and a chamois hunter
- Easiest route: North-east ridge from the Fuorcla dal Zupò (F)

Piz Argient (3,943 m) is a mountain in the Bernina Range of the Alps on the border between Italy and the Swiss canton of Graubünden.

The peak is bounded to the north by the Morteratsch Glacier, to the west by the Upper Scerscen Glacier, and to the south and east by the Fellaria Glacier. It is separated from Piz Zupò to its east by the Fuorcla dal Zupò (3,844 m) and from Crast' Agüzza to its north-west by the Fuorcla da l'Argient (3,691 m).

== Huts ==
- Marco e Rosa Hut (3,610 m)
- Marinelli Hut (2,813 m)
