= Robert Fox =

Robert Fox may refer to:

- Robert Fox (activist) (c. 1846–1933), African-American civil rights activist
- Robert Fox (antiquarian) (1798–1843), English antiquarian
- Robert Fox (footballer) (1931–2026), Australian rules footballer
- Robert Fox (historian) (born 1938), historian of science
- Robert Fox (producer) (1952–2026), English theatre and film producer
- Robert Barclay Fox (1873–1934), Falmouth businessman and Conservative Cornish politician, grandson of Barclay Fox
- Robert Bradford Fox (1918–1985), Philippine historian
- Robert F. "Toby" Fox (born 1991), American game developer, creator of Undertale and Deltarune
- Robert F. "Bob" Fox (born 1941), New York City architect
- Robert Fortescue Fox (1858–1940), British physician and surgeon
- Robert J. Fox (1927–2009), Roman Catholic priest and author from South Dakota
- Robert J. Fox (pastor) (1930–1984), associate pastor and activist from the Bronx
- Robert Were Fox the Elder (1754–1818), Falmouth businessman, father of Robert Were Fox the Younger
- Robert Were Fox the Younger (1789–1877), English geologist and natural philosopher, father of Barclay Fox

== See also ==
- Bob Fox (disambiguation)
