= Piz Bianco =

Mountain in Switzerland

- Piz Alv
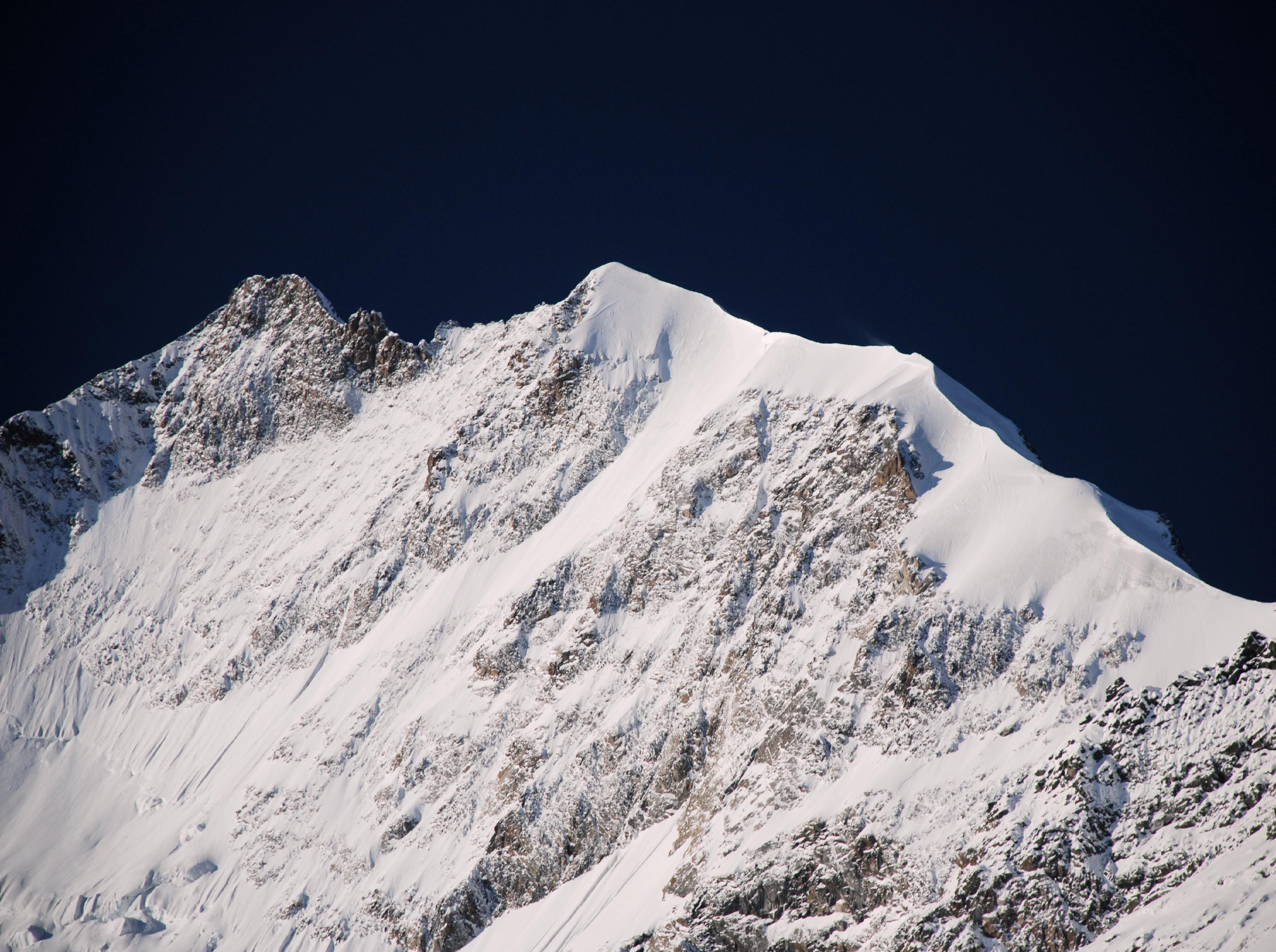
- Piz Bernina (left) and Piz Bianco (center)

Highest point
- Elevation: 3,993 m (13,100 ft)
- Prominence: 20 m (66 ft)
- Parent peak: Piz Bernina
- Coordinates: 46°23′04.6″N 9°54′23.4″E

Geography
- Location within Switzerland
- Location: Graubünden, Switzerland
- Parent range: Bernina Range

Piz Bianco (also known as Piz Alv) is a minor summit north of Piz Bernina, in the Bernina Range of the Alps. It is located south of Pontresina in the canton of Graubünden.

Culminating at 3,993 metres, Piz Bianco is the highest point of the snowy ridge named Biancograt (or Crast'Alva). The summit is often traversed by climbers on the way to Piz Bernina.
