= Morteratsch Glacier =

Glacier in Switzerland

- Vadret da Morteratsch
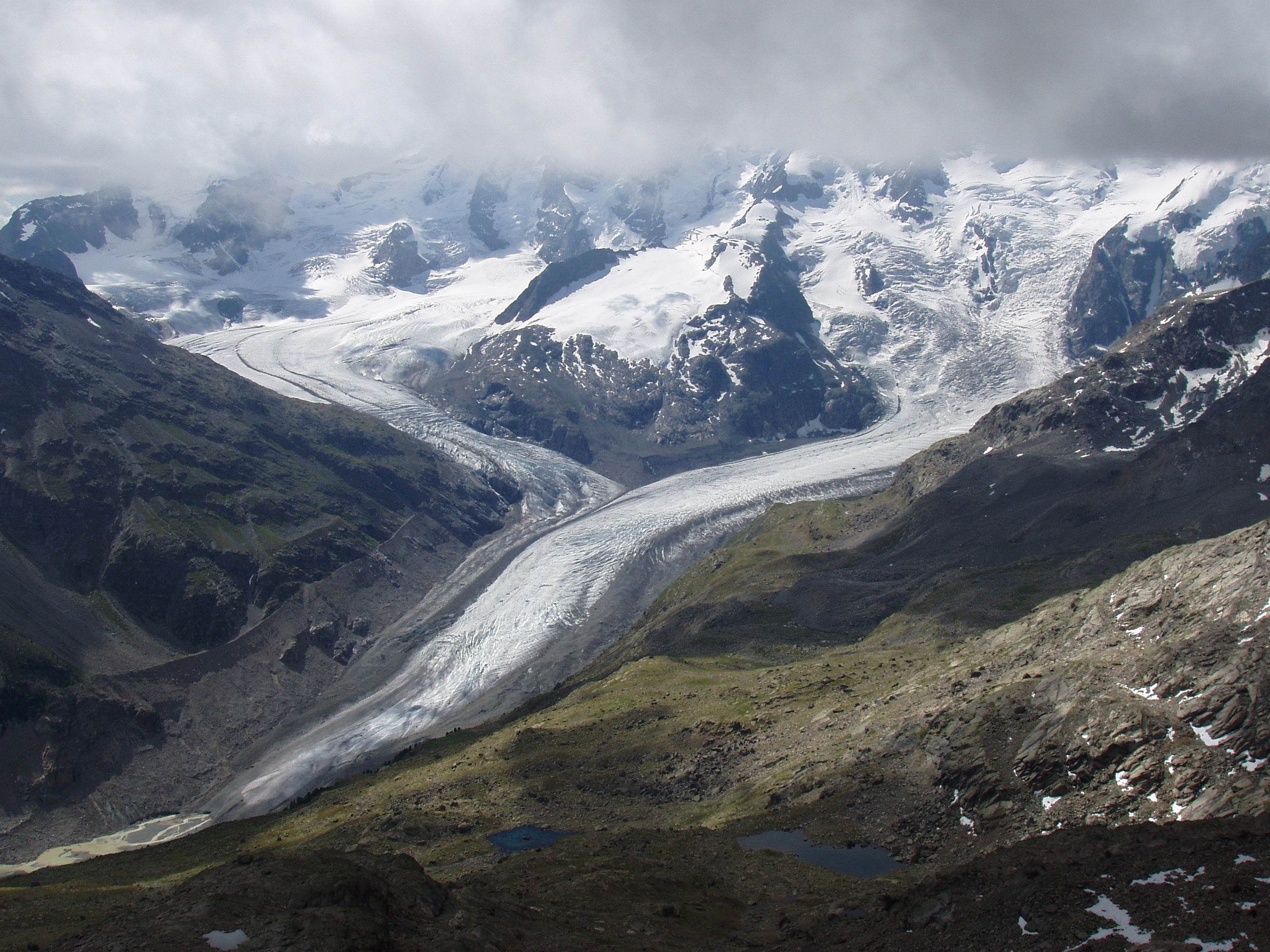
- The Morteratsch (right) and Pers (left) glaciers, 2005
- Interactive map of Morteratsch Glacier
- Type: Valley glacier
- Location: Bernina Range, Switzerland
- Coordinates: 46°24′34″N 9°55′54″E
- Area: 15.3 km^{2} (incl. Pers Glacier) (2008)
- Length: 7 km (1973), 5.85 km (2016)
- Terminus: Ova da Morteratsch (Danube)
- Status: fast retreating

Underwater sound recording of Morteratsch Glacier, recorded by Ludwig Berger

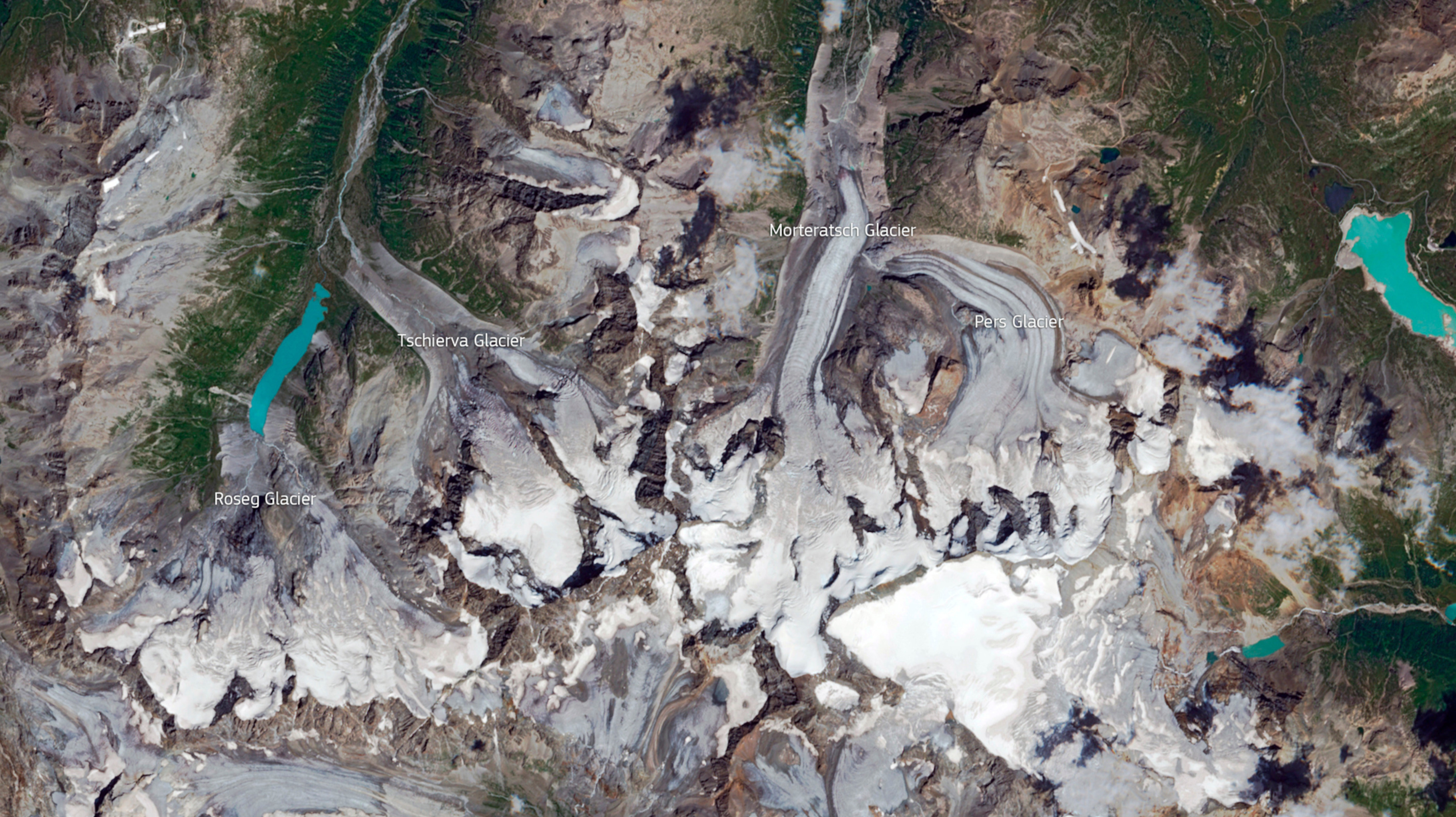
A satellite image of Morteratsch and the surrounding glaciers.

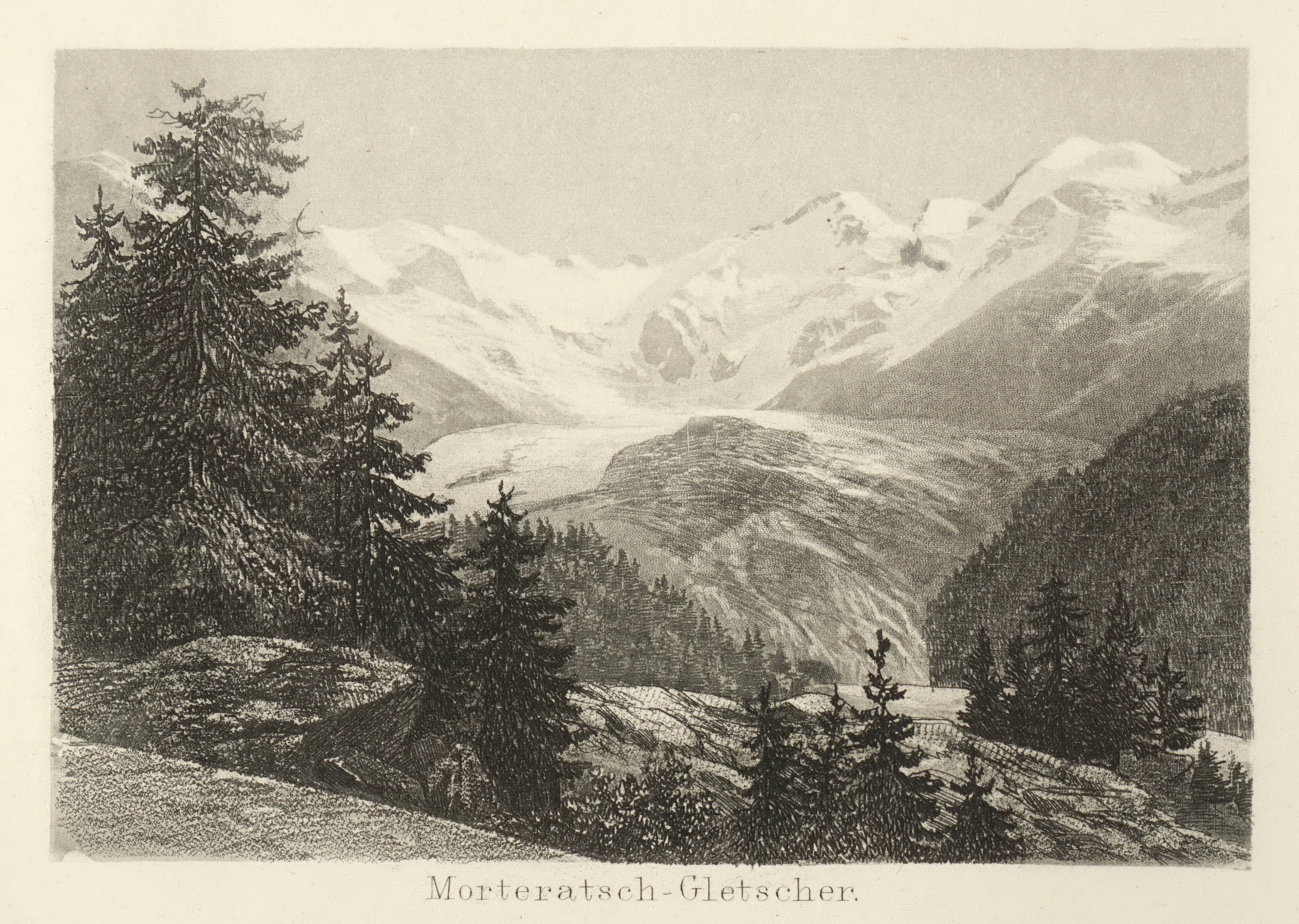
The Morteratsch Glacier c. 1870/80. Etching by Heinrich Müller

The Morteratsch Glacier (Romansh: Vadret da Morteratsch) is the largest glacier by area in the Bernina Range of the Bündner Alps in Switzerland.

By area and by volume (1.2 km^{3}), it is the third largest glacier in the Eastern Alps, after the Pasterze Glacier and Gepatschferner. The Morteratsch Glacier is a typical valley glacier with a pronounced ice front. The accumulation zone lies between the peaks of Piz Morteratsch, Piz Bernina, Crast' Agüzza, Piz Argient, Piz Zupò and Bellavista. From Piz Argient to the ice front in the Val Morteratsch, its horizontal extent is less than ~6 km (3.7 mi), with an altitude difference of up to 2,000 m (6,600 ft).

Together with the Pers Glacier, originating at Piz Palü, which joins the Morteratsch just below the rock formation Isla Persa ("Lost Isle"), as of 1973 it covered an area of about 16 km^{2} (6.2 sq mi). The volume of the ice is estimated to be about 1.2 km^{3}. The Morteratsch Glacier drains into the Ova da Morteratsch, which eventually flows into the Inn and hence via the Danube into the Black Sea.

In spring, depending on the snow conditions, a 10-km-long ski-run accessible to skilled skiers is marked on the glacier. It leads from the Diavolezza aerial tramway terminus to the Morteratsch inn and has an altitude difference of 1,100 m (3,600 ft). The Morteratsch railway station used to be situated directly at the ice front of the glacier. The ice front has receded over 2,800 m (9,200 ft) in the meantime (as of 2016), and can no longer be seen from the station.

Yearly length change measurements have been recorded since 1878. For the period to 1998, the overall retreat was over 1.8 km (1.1 mi) with a mean annual retreat rate of approximately 17.2 m (56 ft) per year. This long-term average has markedly increased in recent years, receding 30 m (98 ft) per year from 1999–2005. Substantial retreat was ongoing through 2006 as well. During the last ten years, it lost another 1 kilometre (0.62 mi).

During the time that measurements have been taken, the glacier has advanced a few meters in only four years. Since the large glaciers react slowly to short-term climate changes, these advances cannot be accounted for by increased precipitation in the accumulation zone in the previous winter. On the high moraines to the left and right of the ice front, which are still nearly free of overgrowth, the enormous quantities of ice which were still being pushed down here at the end of the "Little Ice Age" in the middle of the 19th century can be seen.

In 2017, researchers began developing a snowmaking system to protect the glacier's ice, with a goal of covering square kilometer in 13 feet of snow. It was estimated that a decade of use might make a difference in length of 400-500 meters.

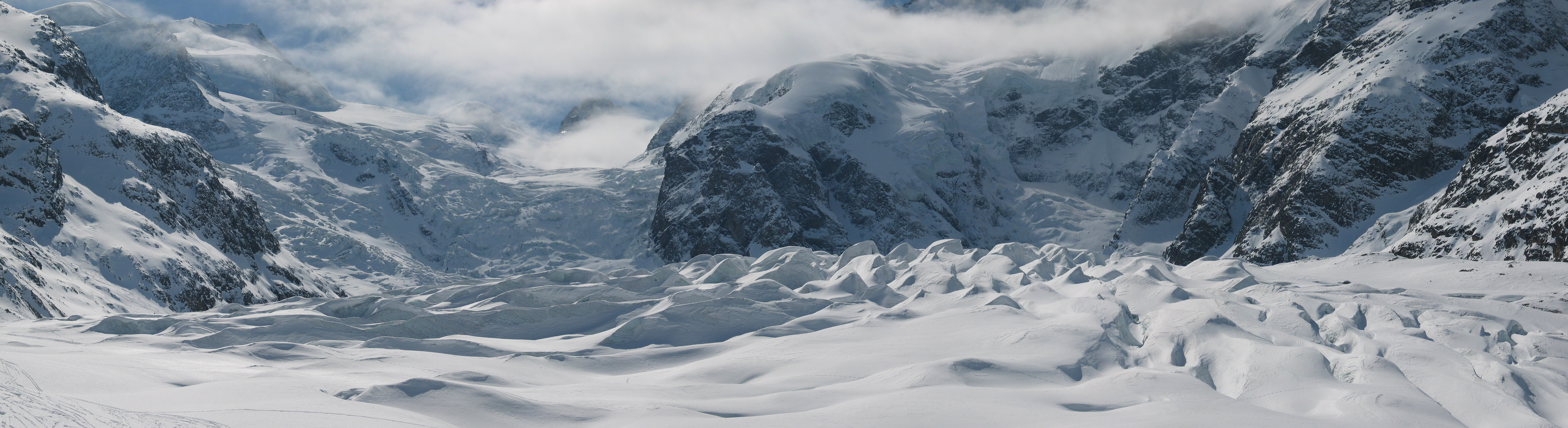
View of the Morteratsch Glacier from the ski run

== See also ==
- List of glaciers in Switzerland
- List of glaciers
- Retreat of glaciers since 1850
- Swiss Alps
