= Physical limnology =

Study of movement of water and its effects

Physical limnology studies the movement of water and its effects on aquatic ecosystems. This includes visible movement of water as well as heat and gas transfers, which alter the properties and content of the water. These properties include changes in water phases, color, light attenuation, temperature, and oxygen content. All these factors influence the survival of species in aquatic ecosystems by altering the conditions for their optimal function. It is important to understand physical limnology to understand the dynamics between aquatic species and their environment.

Physical limnology is one of the subdisciplines of limnology. Limnology is the study of inland aquatic ecosystems' biological, chemical, physical, and geological properties. Data on water quality and quantity, and physical and chemical properties are applied to create more efficient water management plans, improve understanding of aquatic ecosystems, and predict future ecosystem changes.

== Factors that alter physical limnology ==
The main causes of alterations in inland water physical limnology are anthropogenic. Human practices such as agriculture and industrial processes lead to wastewater discharge, which disrupts the ecosystem. The introduction of microplastics, nanoparticles, and medical waste is another contributor to disrupting the natural physical limnology. The main contributor is climate change

=== Pollution of water ===
Microplastics are small pieces of plastic broken down over time. As they continue to accumulate in oceans due to insufficient restrictions on trash management, they pollute aquatic ecosystems. Nanoparticles (NPs) are also present in waste materials and pose a risk to freshwater ecosystems. NPs can affect freshwater food chains as they become absorbed by small plankton, which alter their growth. The disruptions of lower aquatic trophic levels can affect other trophic levels and lead to alterations in the ecosystem balance. Water pollution also comes in the form of medical, agricultural, and industrial waste. The introduction of anthropogenic chemicals disrupts the nutrients and natural processes of the aquatic ecosystem. One key example is eutrophication caused by increased nutrients from agricultural pollution, which create algal blooms in lakes and streams, increasing water temperature. These blooms create dead zones or hypoxic areas because of the depleted oxygen. These changes in water content and quality impact aquatic ecosystem health.

=== Climate change ===
Climate change has the largest impact on physical limnology alterations. Increasing global temperatures lead to increased evaporation, rising sea levels, changing pH concentrations, and increased extreme weather events, which affect the survival of aquatic species. Populations must adapt to these changing conditions by altering their distribution and phenology or face extinction. These alterations in the environment also allow for the spread of invasive species as they can spread to newly suitable habitats. Overall, the water condition alterations due to climate change decrease biodiversity and alter species dynamics.

== Aspects of water ==
As previously mentioned, physical limnology has to do with the movement and qualities. Below is a brief overview of these aspects and how they can be altered.

- Phase changes between gas, liquid, and solid are another aspect of physical limnology. Temperature shifts caused by global warming are increasing water evaporation, which increases the amount of water vapor in the atmosphere, taken from sources like lakes. Global warming also increases the temperature of waters, making some aquatic ecosystems unsuitable for native species.
- Light attenuation is the lessening of sunlight intensity as you go deeper into aquatic ecosystems due to scattering and absorption. The amount of light attenuation in water ecosystems depends on the nutrient content, which often coordinates with the season.
- Oxygen content is vitally important for aquatic ecosystems for organism respiration, nitrification, and decomposition. When oxygen levels are low, hypoxia (environmental) events occur
