= Edgardo Baldi (limnologist) =

Italian limnologist (1899–1951)

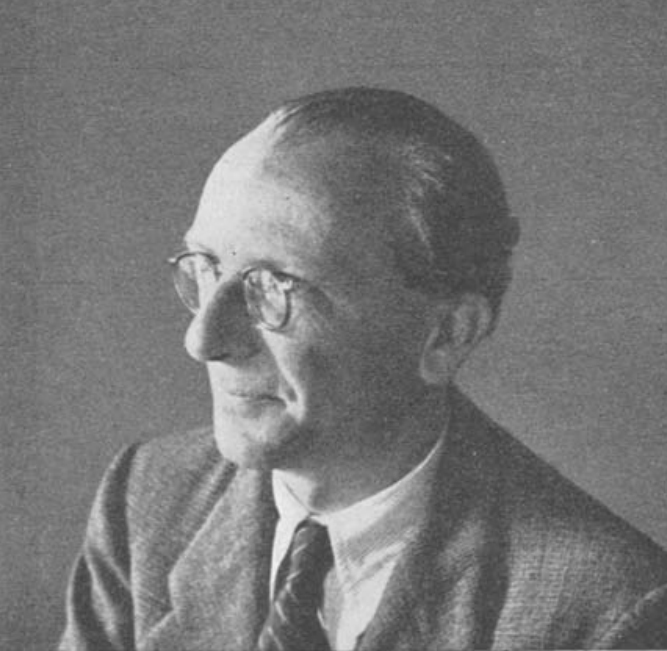

Edgardo Baldi (July 20, 1899 – August 10, 1951) was an Italian limnologist who was a director of the Italian Institute of Hydrobiology at Pallanza and Varenna. He initially studied the neurophysiology of arthropods but spent more of his research as a specialist on the diversity and ecology of zooplankton, particularly the rotifers and crustaceans.

== Life and work ==
Baldi was born in Milan and after high school he went to the University of Pavia where he received a doctorate in 1920 with studies on neurophysiology of insects. He then became interested in the newly developed field of limnology in collaboration with Rina Monti. He became a lecturer at the University of Milan from 1925. In 1939 he was appointed as the first director of the hydrobiology institute established by donation from Marco De Marchi. His work was interrupted and he was enlisted during World War II. He was released in 1942 and he returned to study the alpine lakes in collaboration with Livia Pirocchi, V. Tonolli, G. Morandini, A. Buzzati-Traverso, L. L. Cavalli, L. Trevisan, and many others. They worked on the plankton composition and dynamics of the alpine lakes. He also contributed to the systematics of diaptomid copepods examining the distribution and variation in Eudiaptomus vulgaris. He established the journal of the institute of hydrobiology which he edited from 1942.
