= La Spedla =

Mountain in Switzerland

- Punta Perrucchetti
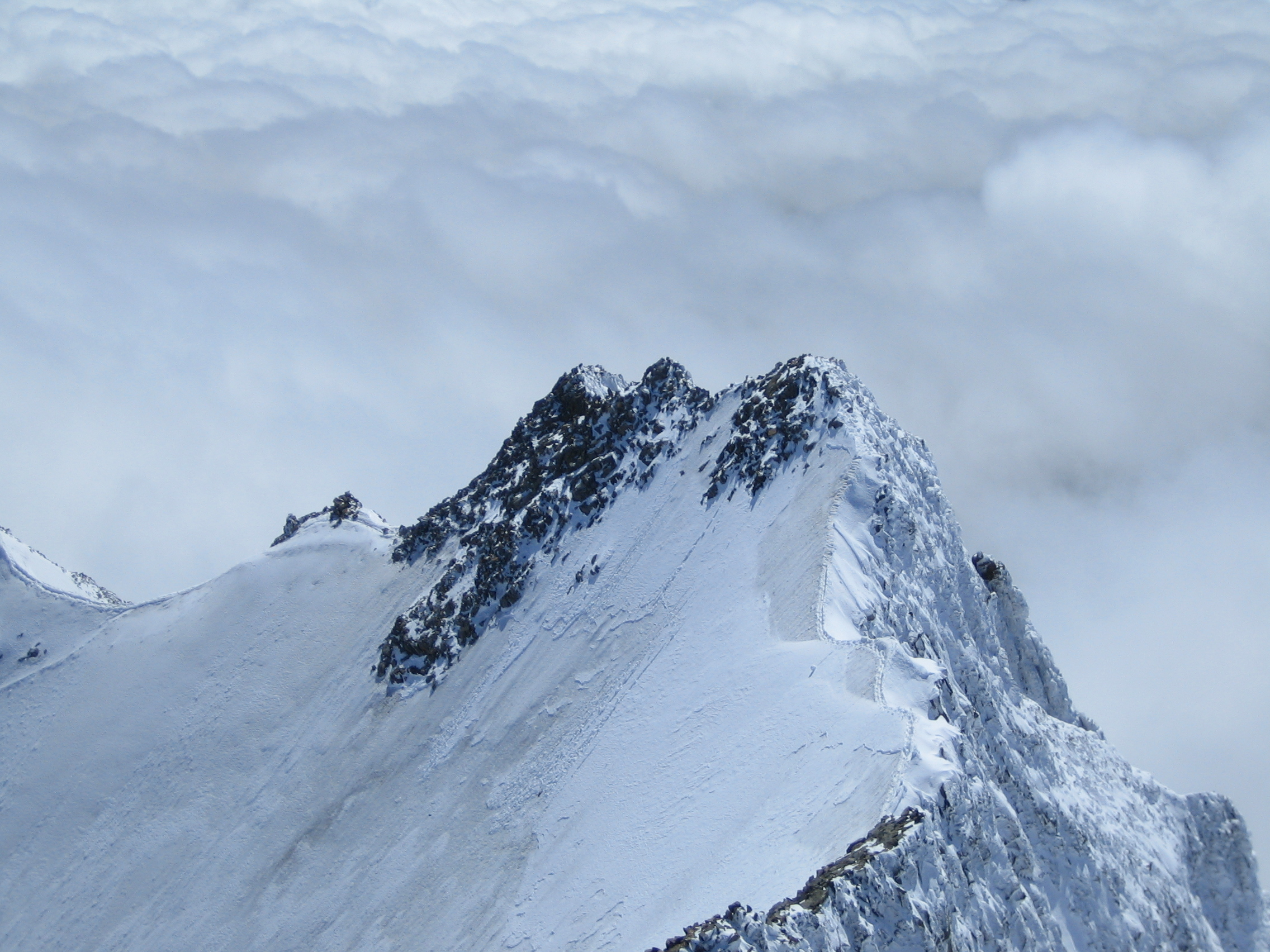
- La Spedla from Piz Bernina (north side)

Highest point
- Elevation: 4,020 m (13,190 ft)
- Prominence: 8 m (26 ft)
- Parent peak: Piz Bernina
- Listing: Italian region high point
- Coordinates: 46°22′51.5″N 9°54′26.8″E

Geography
- Location within Alps
- Location: Graubünden, Switzerland; Lombardy, Italy
- Parent range: Bernina Range

La Spedla (or Punta Perrucchetti) is a minor summit south of Piz Bernina, in the Eastern Alps, on the border between Italy and Switzerland. With a height of 4,020 metres above sea level, the Spedla is the highest summit on the Italian side of the Bernina Range and the highest summit in Lombardy. Because of its small prominence it was included only in the enlarged list of alpine four-thousanders.

== See also ==
- List of Italian regions by highest point
