= Bob Fox (footballer) =

Australian rules footballer

Personal information
- Full name: Bob Fox
- Born: 19 April 1953 (age 73)
- Original team: Braybrook
- Height: 192 cm (6 ft 4 in)
- Weight: 75 kg (165 lb)

Playing career^{1}
Years	Club	Games (Goals)
1972	Footscray	1 (2)
- ^{1} Playing statistics correct to the end of 1972.

Bob Fox (born 19 April 1953) is a former Australian rules footballer who played with Footscray in the Victorian Football League (VFL).
