= Marco De Marchi (naturalist) =

Italian entrepreneur, naturalist and philanthropist (1872–1936)

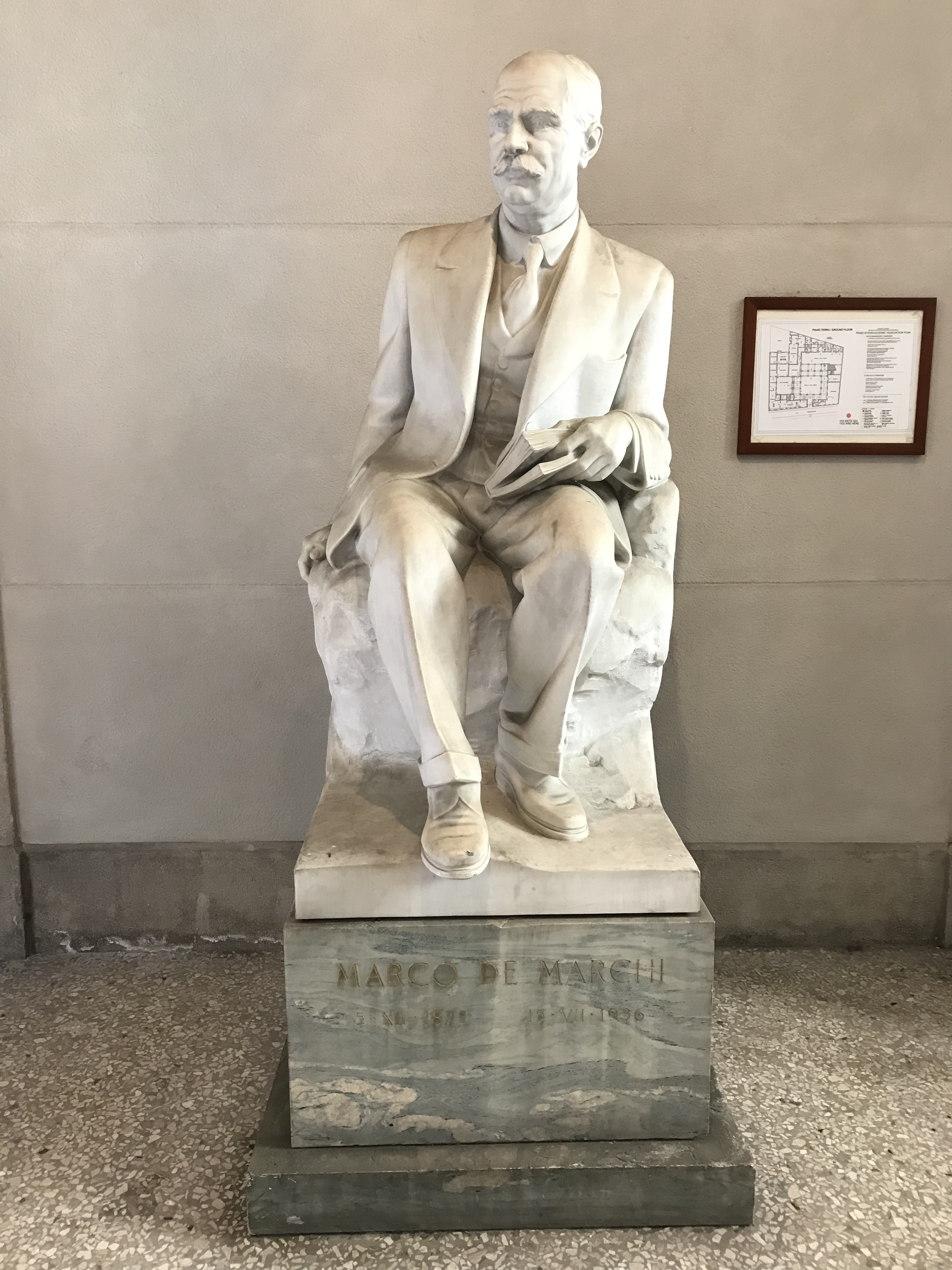
Statue at the Museo del Risorgimento, Milan

Marco De Marchi (December 5, 1872 – July 15, 1936) was an Italian naturalist and businessman. He studied the hummingbirds of Argentina and conducted studies on the aquatic life of Lake Maggiore. He was also a philatelist and philanthropist. He bequeathed his villa in Varenna for the hydrobiology institute of the University of Milan.

== Life and work ==
De Marchi was born in Milan, the son of Demetrio, who owned chemical industries in Argentina, and his wife Giuditta Ricciardi. The family had Swiss origins and De Marchi's grandfather had served as consul for Italy in Buenos Aires. The family had established a pharmaceutical industry and an ice production factory. Ice was needed as part of meat export. After studies in Milan he joined the University of Pisa in 1890 but quit studied when his father died in 1893. He took over the family business and travelled to Argentina between 1890 and 1899. He completed studies at the University of Pavia and specialized in the study of plankton and zoology under Pietro Pavesi. He wrote a thesis on the hummingbirds of Argentina as his thesis in 1901. This was based on an examination of the Turati collection under Giacinto Martorelli (1855–1917). It was published as a book I Trochilidi dell'Argentina in 1906. He set up a limnology laboratory at this villa on Lake Maggiore in Pallanza and continued to publish research. He worked with various organization, serving as vice president and later president of the Italian Society for Natural Sciences. During World War I he established a hospital for the wounded, a school of nursing, and facilities for the care of orphans and widows. He founded the journal Natura and donated towards the natural history museum in Milan. He also established an alpine garden in Piccolo San Bernardo in 1918. He died at Varenna in Villa Monastero and was survived by his wife Rosa Curioni. He bequeathed his Pallanza Villa to the Italian state which established the institute of hydrobiology. He left his philatelic collections to the Museum of the Risorgimento at the Sforza Castle in Milan.

A street in Milan is named after him. The Italian postal department produced a commemorative stamp in 1987.
