= Bellavista (mountain) =

Mountain in Switzerland

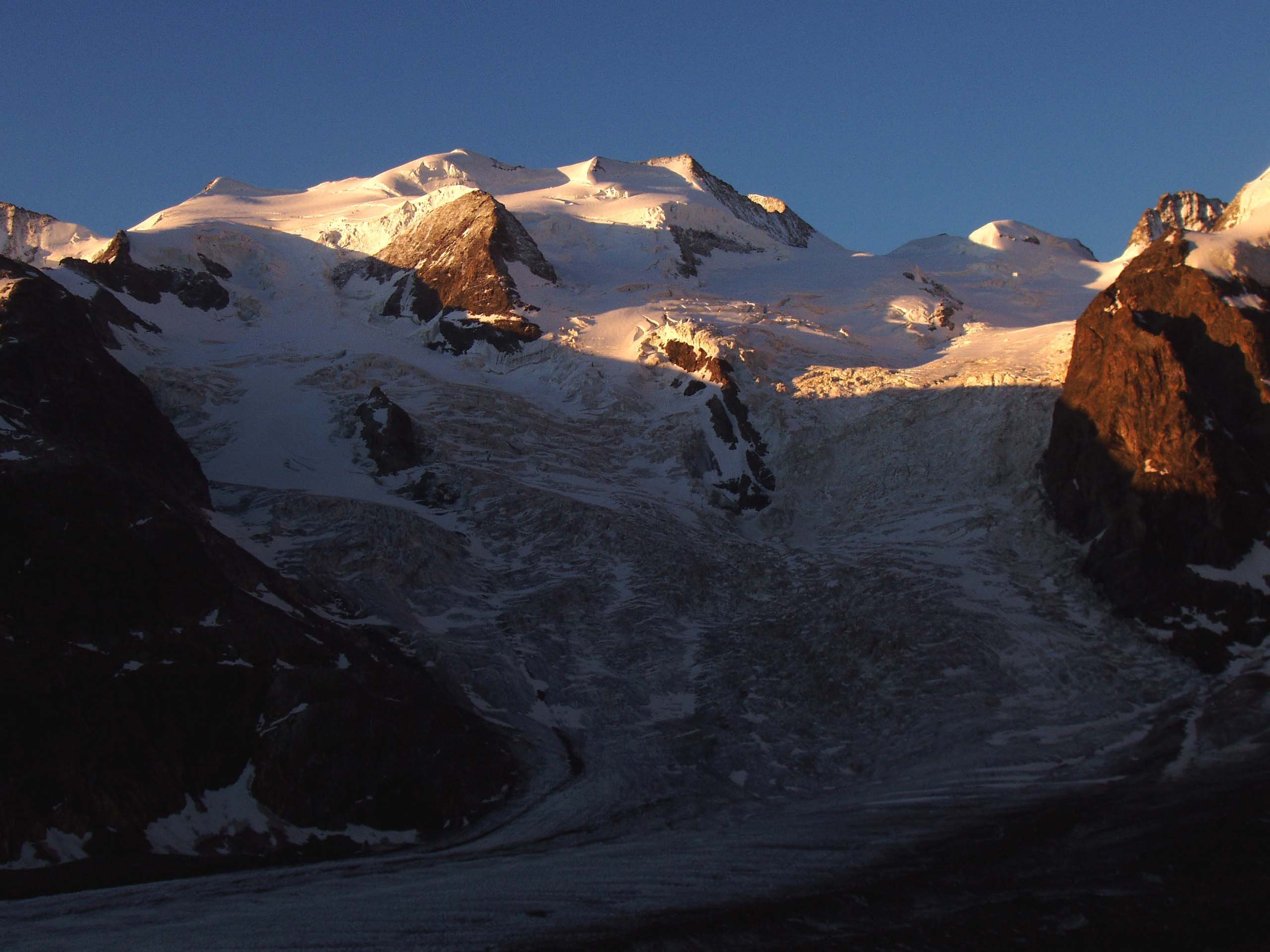
- Bellavista seen from the Boval hut (its four peaks can be seen on the summit ridge), with Piz Argient (snowy dome, right) and Crast' Agüzza (rocky peak, extreme right)

Highest point
- Elevation: 3,921 m (12,864 ft)
- Prominence: 81 m (266 ft)
- Parent peak: Piz Argient
- Listing: Highest mountains of Switzerland; Mountains of Italy
- Coordinates: 46°22′25″N 9°55′56″E

Geography
- Location within Alps
- Countries: Italy and Switzerland
- Parent range: Bernina Range

Climbing
- First ascent: 10 September 1868 by Emil Burckhardt and Hans Grass
- Easiest route: East–west traverse, a snow arete (F)

Bellavista is a 3,921-metre (12,864 ft) mountain in the Bernina Range between Switzerland and Italy. The mountain is bounded on the east by the Fuorcla Bellavista and on the west by the Pass dal Zupò. There are four summits on the main ridge, at the heights of 3798 m (Northeast-Top), 3885 m (Middle-Top), 3890 m (Northeastern Fore-Top), and 3921 m (Main-Top/Southwest-Top) from east to west.

The first traverse of all four peaks was made by Emil Burckhardt and Hans Grass on 10 September 1868. C. C. Branch and B. Wainewright with guide Martin Schocher made the first traverse of the Bellavista peaks and the three peaks of the neighbouring Piz Palü on 19 August 1889.
