= Robert Were Fox the Elder =

Quaker businessman (1754 – 1818)

Robert Were Fox (5 July 1754 – 1818) was a Quaker businessman who lived in Falmouth.

== Life and work ==
Fox was born in Fowey, Cornwall, in the United Kingdom, and married Elizabeth Tregelles (1768–1849) in 1788. The couple had six sons, including Charles Fox of Trebah, Robert Were Fox FRS of Penjerrick Garden and Alfred Fox of Glendurgan. They also had two daughters: Mariana Fox (1807–1863), who married Francis Tuckett of Frenchay and became the mother of the mountaineer Francis Fox Tuckett, and Charlotte, born in 1799, who married Samuel Fox of Tottenham.

The Fox family were Quakers, descended from George Fox of Fowey and his wife, Anna Debell. Robert Were Fox was the son of George Croker Fox and his wife, Mary Were. It was George Croker Fox founded a Falmouth ship-brokering business that continued into the 21st century.

Under Robert Were Fox's management, the family's business interests expanded into copper mining, tin smelting, and foundry work, in partnership with the Williams family. In 1794, R. W. Fox was appointed Consul (Diplomatic Representative) by the United States of America for the port of Falmouth.

In 1811, Fox was one of four delegates sent to negotiate with the Post Office headquarters in Lombard Street, London, for the return of the Packet Service station to Falmouth from Plymouth.
