= Livia Pirocchi Tonolli =

Italian freshwater biologist

- Born: 1909; Milan
- Died: 15 December 1985 (aged 75–76); Verbania
- Other name: Livia Pirocchi
- Awards: Naumann-Thienemann Medal

Livia Pirocchi Tonolli (née Pirocchi; 15 September 1909 – 15 December 1985) was an Italian freshwater biologist. She was the director of the Institute of Hydrobiology in Pallanza, and lectured at the University of Milan. She was awarded the E. Naumann-A Thieneman Medal, the Italian Ecological Society’s gold medal, and was an honorary member of the American Society of Zoologists.

== Early life and education ==
Tonolli was born Livia Pirocchi in 15 September 1909. She studied natural sciences at the University of Milan, graduating in 1932.

== Career ==
Tonolli was employed as a lecturer at the Institute of Zoology in Milan, and at the Institute of Hidrobiology in Pallanza. She became an assistant professor in 1939, and took over as deputy director when the incumbent Edgardo Baldi left for military service.

Tonolli met her husband Vittorio Tonolli at the Institute, and the two worked together until his death in 1967. Vittorio had been the institute’s director before his death, and Tonolli was appointed in his place.

Tonolli was founding member and president of the Italian Association for Oceanography and Limnology. She was also editor of Memorie, the journal of the Pallanza Institute, and was on a number of editorial boards, including Hydrobiologia. Tonolli authored more than 80 scientific articles.

Tonolli set up two foundations, the International Vittorio Tonolli Memorial Fund, which supports freshwater research in developing countries, and the Vittorio Tonolli Foundation for Cardiological Culture.

== Recognition ==
In 1974 Tonolli was awarded the Silver Medal for Merit in Culture, Science, and Art. The Societas Internationalis Limnologiae awarded her the E. Naumann-A Thieneman Medal in 1983, ”for her original work in plankton ecology and leadership in promoting national and international limnological research”. She was also awarded the Italian Ecological Society’s gold medal. In 1984 she was made an honorary member of the American Society of Zoologists.
