= Piz Palü =

Mountain in Switzerland

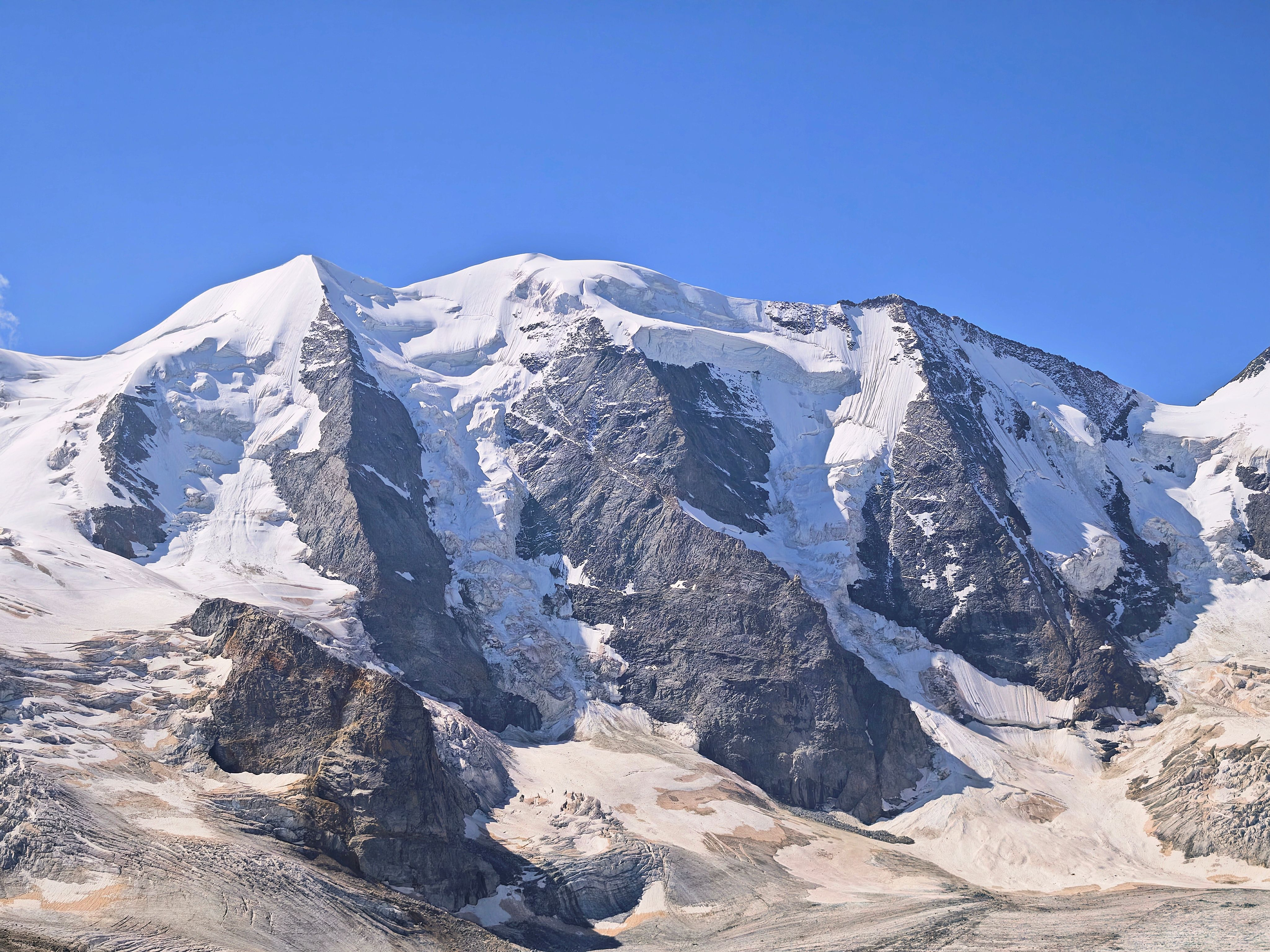
- Northern side of Piz Palü from Diavolezza

Highest point
- Elevation: 3,899 m (12,792 ft)
- Prominence: 223 m (732 ft)
- Parent peak: Piz Zupò
- Isolation: 2.1 km (1.3 mi)
- Coordinates: 46°22′42″N 9°57′38″E

Geography
- Location within Alps
- Location: Graubünden, Switzerland - Lombardy, Italy
- Parent range: Bernina Range

Climbing
- First ascent: 1866 by K. E. Digby with guide Peter Jenny and a porter
- Easiest route: Snow climb from Diavolezza over the Pers Glacier

Piz Palü is a mountain in the Bernina Range of the Alps, located between Switzerland and Italy. It is a large glaciated massif composed of three main summits, on a ridge running from west to east. The main (and central) summit is 3,899 metres high and is located within the Swiss canton of Graubünden, although the border with the Italian region of Lombardy runs about 100 metres west of it at almost the same height (3,898 m). The western summit (3,823 m; on the international border) is named Piz Spinas and is the only one not covered by ice. The eastern summit (3,882 m; within Switzerland) is named Piz Palü Orientale. The name Palü derives from the Latin palus, meaning a swamp, and the mountain is said to be named after the Alpe Palü, a high alpine pasture some 4 km to its east.

== Climbing history ==
As early as 12 August 1835, the 3,882 m east peak was climbed by Oswald Heer, and Peter and M. Flury, with guides Johann Madutz and Gian Marchet Colani (the 'chamois king of the Bernina'), who were under the impression that this was the highest summit of the mountain. This is still the normal route from Switzerland, be it followed by an easy traverse to the central peak. A second ascent of the east summit was made on 24 July 1864 by Edward N. Buxton, W.F. Digby, William Edward Hall, J. Johnston, and Montagu Woodmass with the Pontresina guides Peter Jenny, Alexander Flury, and J. B. Walther. This group was unaware of the ascent almost 30 years earlier and also believed to have reached the highest summit (they had no vision on the summit). Approaching from the Italian (south) side, four weeks later (17 August 1864) D. W. Freshfield, J. D. Walker and R. M. Beachcroft with the guide François Devouassoud climbed the pass between the central and east summits, but chose to climb the latter peak again.

It is uncertain when the central and highest peak (sometimes distinguished by the name Muot da Palü) was first reached. Robin Collomb believes that this was in 1866 by Kenelm Edward Digby with the before mentioned guide Peter Jenny and a porter. It was certainly ascended on 28 June 1868 by A. W. Moore, Horace Walker and Jakob Anderegg. Just four weeks later a traverse of all three peaks was made by Herren Albert Wachler, Wallner, and George, with the guides Hans and Christian Grass on 22 July 1868.

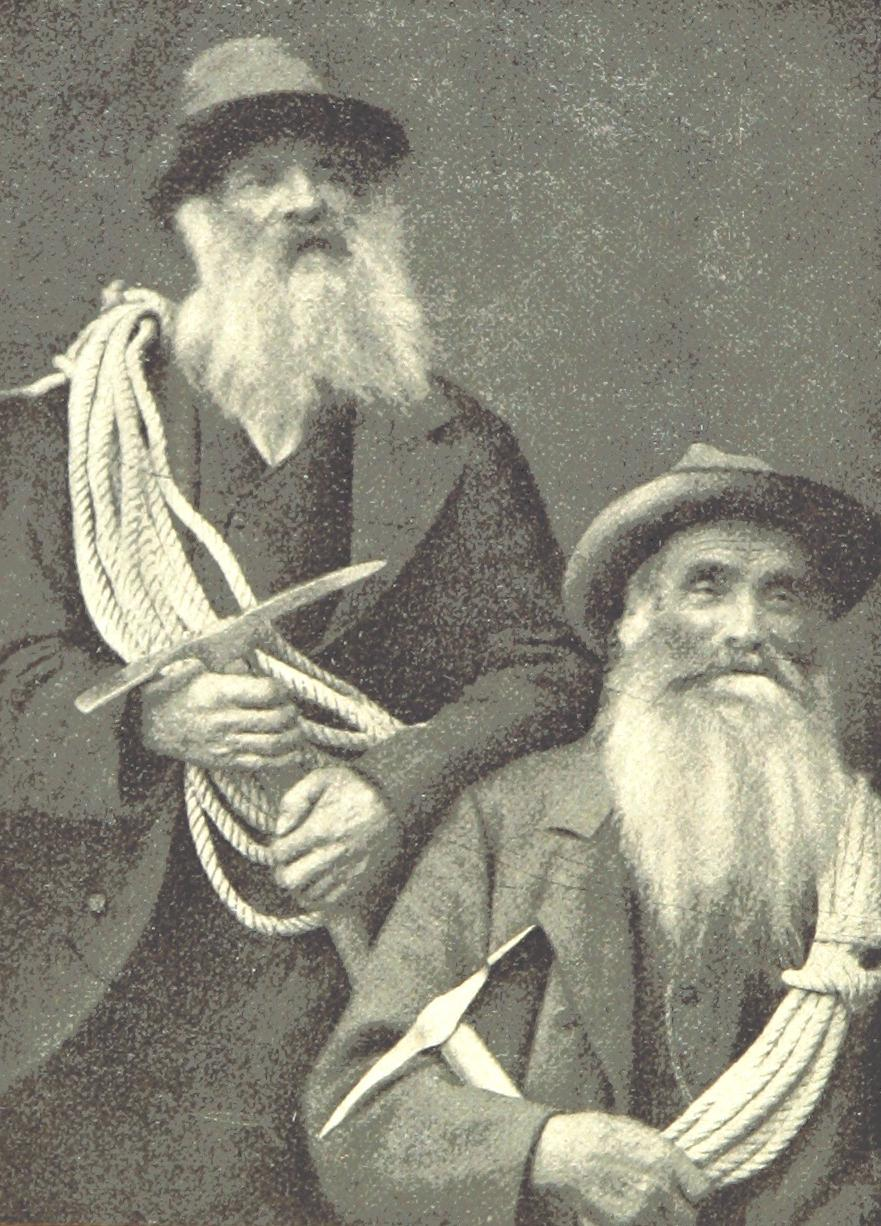
Hans and Christian Grass of Pontresina.

The mountain has gained some prominence from the film The White Hell of Pitz Palu (1929), co-directed by mountain-film pioneer Arnold Fanck and Georg Wilhelm Pabst, and starring a young Leni Riefenstahl.

== Panorama ==
360° panorama from Piz Palü
