= Piz Zupò =

Mountain in the Bernina Range of the Alps

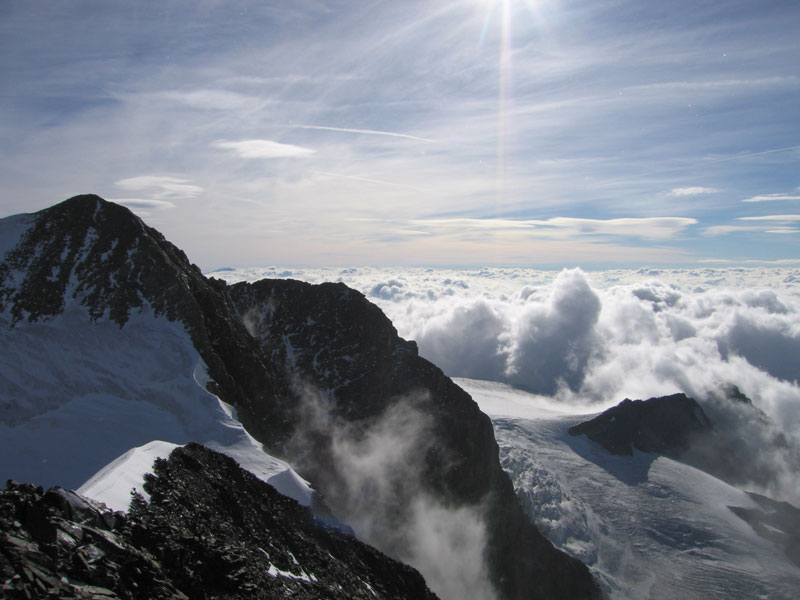
- Piz Zupò seen from Piz Argient

Highest point
- Elevation: 3,995 m (13,107 ft)
- Prominence: 414 m (1,358 ft)
- Parent peak: Piz Bernina
- Listing: Alpine mountains above 3000 m
- Coordinates: 46°22′06″N 9°55′52″E

Naming
- English translation: Hidden peak

Geography
- Location within Alps
- Location: Lombardy, Italy; Graubünden, Switzerland
- Parent range: Bernina Range

Climbing
- First ascent: 9 July 1863 by L. Enderlin and Serardi, with Badrutt
- Easiest route: SW ridge (F)

Piz Zupò (3,995 m) is a mountain in the Bernina Range of the Alps, located on the border between Switzerland and Italy. It lies between the valleys of Morteratsch (Graubünden) and Malenco (Lombardy). Piz Zupò is the second highest peak in the range after Piz Bernina.

The first ascent of the mountain was made by L. Enderlin and Serardi, with Badrutt (a chamois hunter) on 9 July 1863.

== See also ==
- List of mountains of the Alps above 3000 m
- List of mountains of Switzerland
