= Crast' Agüzza =

Mountain in Switzerland

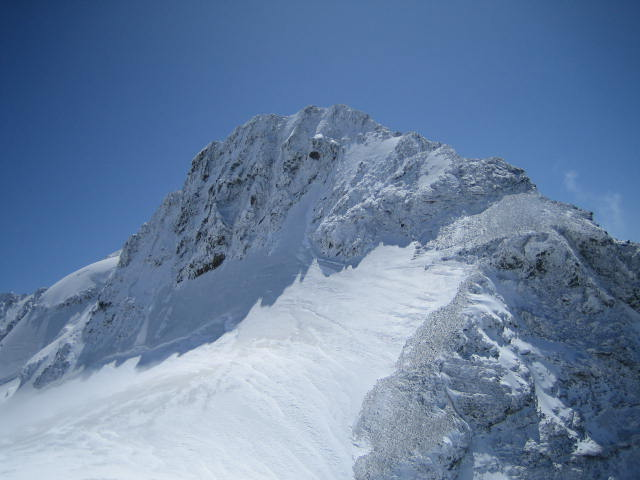
- View from Rifugio Marco e Rosa (north side)

Highest point
- Elevation: 3,870 m (12,700 ft)
- Prominence: 179 m (587 ft)
- Parent peak: Piz Zupò
- Coordinates: 46°22′50″N 9°54′25″E

Naming
- English translation: Pointed peak

Geography
- Location within Alps
- Location: Lombardy, Italy / Graubünden, Switzerland
- Parent range: Bernina Range

Geology
- Mountain type: Granite

Climbing
- First ascent: 17 July 1865 by Johann Jakob Weilenmann, J. A. Specht, Franz Pöll and Jakob Pfitschner via west ridge
- Easiest route: East ridge–west ridge traverse from Marco e Rosa Hut (PD+)

Crast' Agüzza ([ˌkraʃtɐˈdʑytsɐ], known also as Cresta Güzza) (3,870 m) is a mountain in the Bernina Range in Italy and Switzerland.

The peak is bounded to the north by the Morteratsch Glacier and to the south by the Upper Scerscen Glacier. To its immediate north-west lies the Fuorcla Crast' Agüzza (3,581 m); according to Collomb, this is 'the most important glacier pass across the central Bernina Alps; comparable in position with Col du Géant in the Mont Blanc range.' The first party to reach the pass (from the north) comprised E. S. Kennedy and J. F. Hardy, with guides Peter and F. Jenny and A. Flury, on 23 July 1861. The first party to traverse the col comprised Francis Fox Tuckett and E. N. Buxton together with guides Peter Jenny, Christian Michel and Franz Biner on 28 July 1864.

The usual ascent is made via the rocky east ridge from the Fuorcla da l'Argient. This route was first climbed by Emil Burckhardt with Hans Grass and Peter Egger in August 1874.

The mountain is known locally as the Engadin Matterhorn.

== Huts ==
- Marco e Rosa Hut (3,597 m)
