= Piz Tschierva =

Mountain in Switzerland

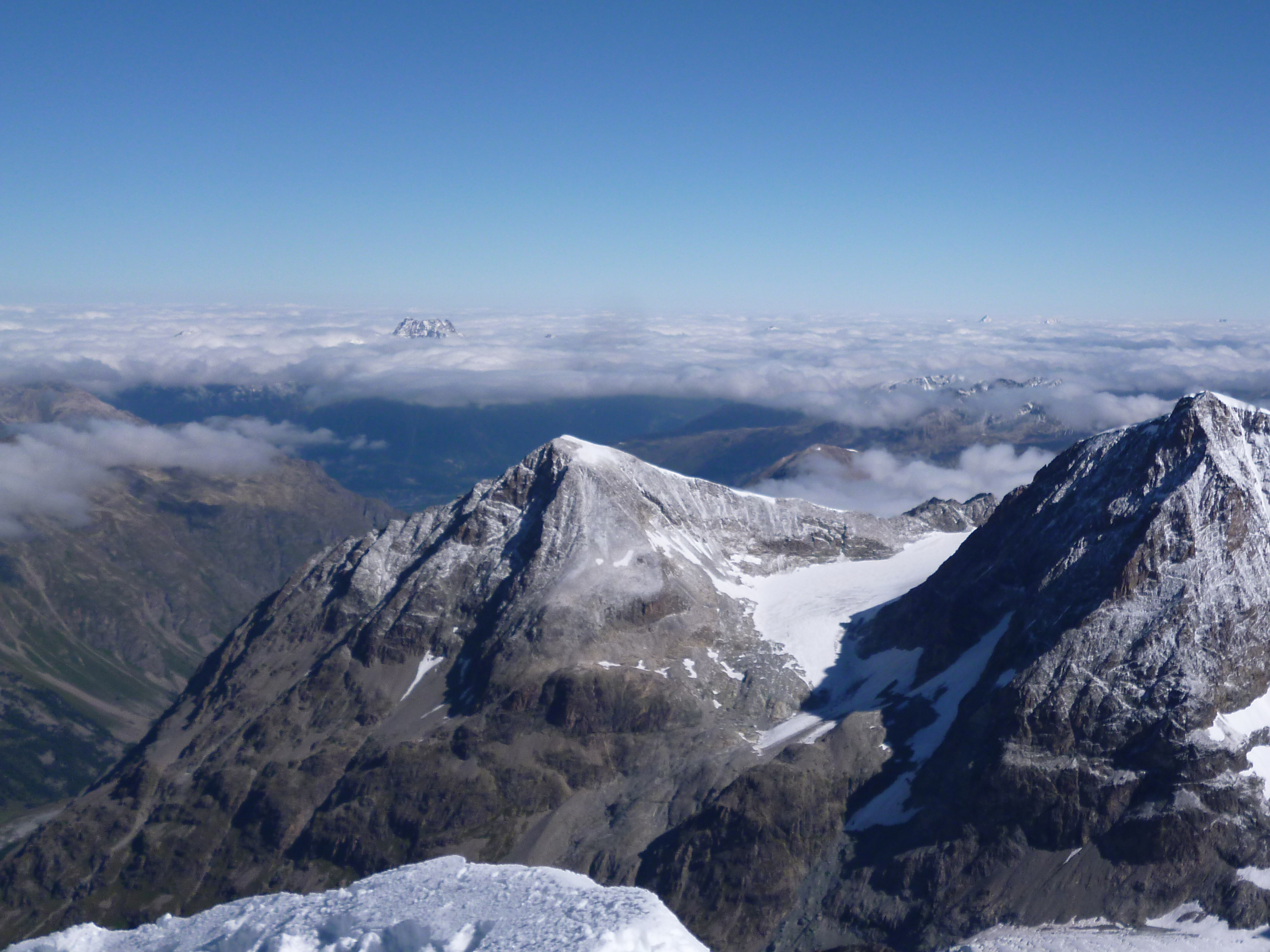
- Piz Tschierva from south, from Piz Roseg, on the right Piz Morteratsch

Highest point
- Elevation: 3,545 m (11,631 ft)
- Prominence: 211 m (692 ft)
- Parent peak: Piz Morteratsch
- Coordinates: 46°24′50.6″N 9°53′10.1″E

Naming
- English translation: Deer mountain

Geography
- Location within Switzerland
- Location: Graubünden, Switzerland
- Parent range: Bernina Range

Climbing
- First ascent: 18 August 1850 by Johann Coaz and party
- Easiest route: East ridge, from Tschierva Hut (F)

Piz Tschierva (3,545 m) is a mountain in the Bernina Range of the Alps, located south of Pontresina in the canton of Graubünden. It lies in the range that separates the valley of Roseg from the valley of Morteratsch, north of Piz Bernina. Its summit is located within the valley of Roseg.

Piz Tschierva lies between two glaciers named Vadret da Misaun (north) and Vadrettin da Tschierva (south). The much larger Tschierva Glacier is located at the southern foot of the mountain.

== Huts ==
- Tschierva Hut (2,583 m) (Chamanna Tschierva)
- Boval Hut (2,495 m) (Chamanna da Boval)
