= Johann Coaz =

Swiss forester, topographer and mountaineer

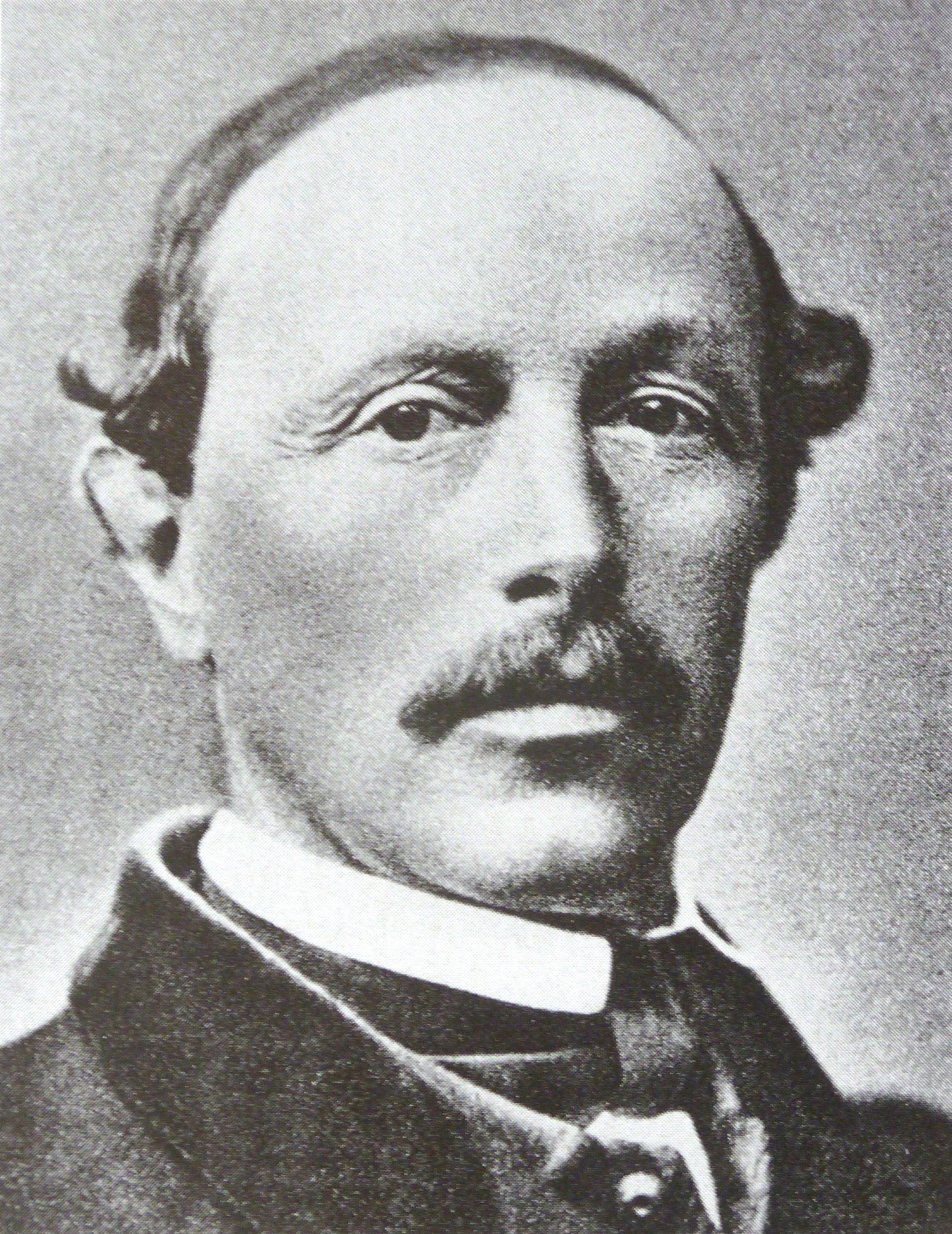
Johann Coaz

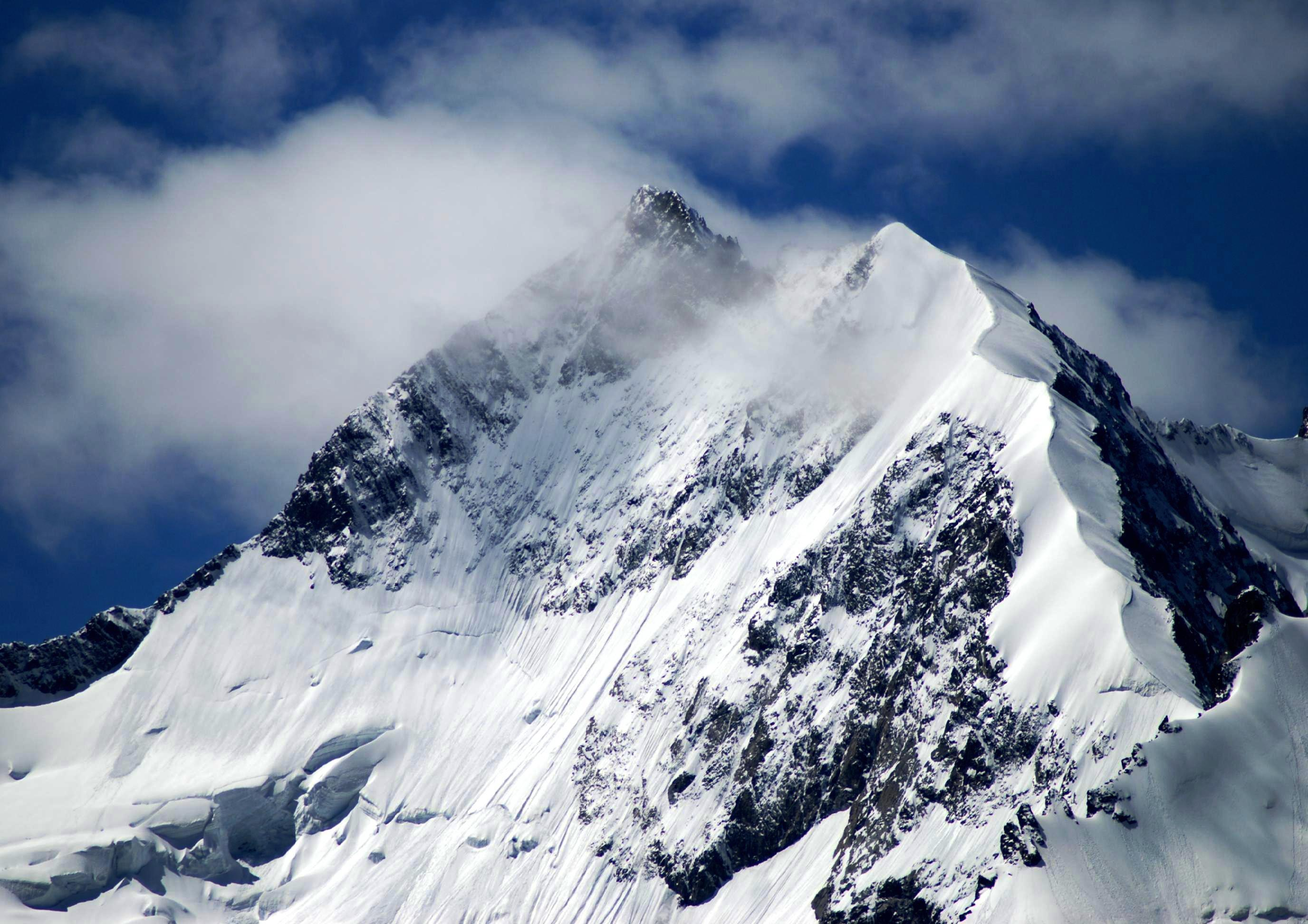
Piz Bernina

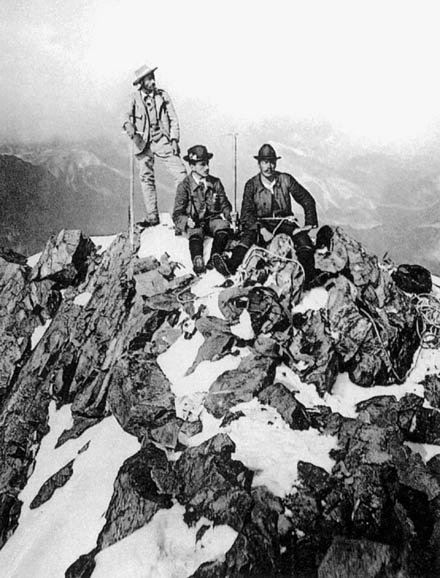
Coaz and the Tscharner brothers on the summit of Piz Bernina during the first ascent, 13 September 1850

Johann Wilhelm Fortunat Coaz (31 May 1822 – 18 August 1918) was a Swiss forester, topographer and mountaineer from Graubünden. In 1850 he made the first ascent of Piz Bernina, the highest mountain in the Eastern Alps. He also gave Piz Bernina its name, after the eponymous pass.

== Life ==
Coaz was born in Antwerp in 1822, the son of Wilhelm Johann Coaz, a professional officer, and his wife Salomé née Koehl. He died in Chur in 1918.

== Forestry and topography ==
Between 1841 and 1843 he trained at the Royal Saxon Academy of Forestry in Tharandt to become a forester, then assumed the role of mountain topographer in Graubünden in the service of the Federal Topographic Bureau. When he was 28 he became private secretary to the topographer Guillaume-Henri Dufour. From 1851 to 1873 he was chief forestry inspector of the cantons of Graubünden and St. Gallen (1873–75). In 1875 Coaz became the first Federal Chief Forestry Inspector, a position he held until 1914.

Coaz was scientifically active in the areas of forest botany, topography, meteorology, and glacier and avalanche research. He described Larix X marschlinsii Coaz, noted in Krüssmann as a hybrid between L. kaempferi and L. russica that came from the Tscharnerholz Forest Nursery, near Morat, Switzerland in 1901 (the species is now considered a hybrid between L. decidua and L. kaempferi). He was awarded an honorary doctorate from the University of Bern in 1902.

== Mountaineering ==
As a climber and surveyor he made around 30 first ascents in the Alps, mostly in the Bernina Range, the Albula Alps, and the Upper and Lower Engadin. In 1846 he made the first ascent of Piz Kesch on 7 September, and in the same year he made the first ascent of Piz Languard, Piz Surlej, Piz Aguagliols, Piz d'Esen and Piz Lischana. In 1848 he made the first ascent of Piz Quattervals.

His most significant and celebrated first ascent was of Piz Bernina, at 4,049 m the highest summit in the Eastern Alps, together with two assistants, brothers Jon and Lorenz Ragut Tscharner on 13 September 1850. Their route was via "The Labyrinth" and the east ridge. Although all three were surveyors, they left their surveying equipment at the foot of the ridge. Coaz later wrote in his diary:

At 6 pm we stood on the ardently desired lofty peak on soil that no human had trod upon before, on the highest point of the canton at 4052 meters [sic] above sea level. Serious thoughts took hold of us. Greedy eyes surveyed the land up to the distant horizon, and thousands and thousands of mountain peaks surrounded us, rising as rocks from the glittering sea of ice. Amazed and awe-struck we gazed across this magnificent mountain world.

—

In 1850 he made the first recorded ascent of Piz Corvatsch, and of Piz Tschierva (on 18 August).

== Commemoration ==
- A statue of Coaz was placed outside the Boval Hut to the north-east of Piz Morteratsch in 1922, to mark the 100th anniversary of his birth.
- The Coaz Hut (2,610 m) to the immediate west of Piz Roseg in the Bernina Range is named after him. Designed by Jakob Echenmoser, it is a 16-sided building that replaced an earlier structure and was opened in 1964.

== Bibliography ==
=== Works by Coaz ===
- Der Wald, Wilhelm Engleman, Leipzig, 1861, 80pp.
- Geschichtlich-statisticher Bericht an den hochlöbl: Grossen Rath über das Forstwesen in Graubünden mit besonderer Berücksichtigung des Zeitraums von 1851/52 bis Ende 1868, Offizin von Pradella u. Meyer, 1869, 38pp.
- Das Bündner Oberland: Itinerarium für das Excursionsgebiet des S.A.C Jahrbuch des Schweizer Alpenclub, Druck der Zollikofer'schen Buchdruckerei, 1874, 75pp.
- La culture des osiers: rapport à la réunion de la Société suisse des forestiers le 28 août 1878 (with Albert Davall), Jent & Reinert, 1879, 31pp.
- Die Kultur der Weide: Vorgetragen in der Versammlung des schweizerischen Forstvereins zu Aarau den 26. August 1878, Schweizerischer Forstverein. Jahresversammlung, 1879, 29pp.
- Les ouragans des 20 février, 25 juin et 5 décembre 1879 et leurs ravages dans les forêts de la Suisse, Département fédéral du commerce et de l'industrie, Impr. Jent et Reinert, 1880, 57pp.
- Die Lawinen der Schweizeralpen, J. Dalp, 1881, 147pp.
- Der Frostschaden des Winters 1879/80 und des Spätfrostes vom 19./20. Mai 1880 an den Holzgewächsen in der Schweiz: Bearbeitet und veröffentlicht im Auftrage des Eidg. Handels- und Landwirthschaftsdepartements, 1882, 176pp.
- Der Lawinenschaden im schweizerischen Hochgebirge im Winter und Frühjahr 1887–88, Stämpfli, 1889, 67pp.
- "Forêts", Part 5 of Bibliographie nationale suisse, Wyss., 1894, 14pp.
- Anweisung zur Erforschung der Verbreitung der wildwachsenden Holzarten in der Schweiz (with Carl Schröter), Büchler, 1902, 10pp.
- Graubünden und das revidierte Bundesgesetz über die Forstpolizei, Manatschal Ebner & Co., 1902, 10pp.
- "Forstwesen: b) Forstverwaltung", Verlag Encyklopädie, 1903, 2pp.
- Das Oberengadin, Engadin Press Co., 1904, 2pp.
- Dendrologische Leistungen in der Schweiz: Vortrag zu Konstanz 1905, Hermann Beyer & Söhne, Langensalza, 1905, 2pp.
- Ein Besuch in Val Scarl: Seitental des Unterengadin (with Carl Schröter and H. C. Schellenberg), Stämpfli, 1905, 55pp.
- Statistik und Verbau der Lawinen in den Schweizeralpen, Buchdr. Staempfli, 1910, 126pp.
- Kulturversuch mit ausländischen Holzarten in der Waldung des Schlosses Marschlins, Gemeindegebiet von Igis, in Graubünden, Bühler & Company, 1917, 14pp.
- Der graue Lärchenwickler als Schädling und dessen Bekämpfung, Büchler & Co., 1917, 18pp.
- Erster Versuch eines Lawinen-Verbaues und erste Lawinen-Statistik samt Karte, Sprecher, Eggerling & Company, 1918, 5pp.
- Aus dem Leben eines schweizerischen Topographen von 1844 bis 1851, Stämpfli, 1918, 20pp.

=== Works on Coaz ===
- Conradin Ragaz: "Johann Wilhelm Fortunat Coaz", in Bedeutende Bündner aus fünf Jahrhunderten, Calven-Verlag, Chur, 1970, vol. 2, pp. 108–18.
- Conradin Ragaz: "Johann Wilhelm Coaz", in Pius Bischofberger, Bruno Schmid (eds), Grosse Verwaltungsmänner der Schweiz. Union, Union Druck + Verlag AG, Solothurn, 1975, pp. 169–74.
