= Piz Sella =

Mountain in Switzerland

- Location within Alps

Highest point
- Elevation: 3,506 m (11,503 ft)
- Coordinates: 46°21′45″N 9°52′05″E

Geography
- Location: Graubünden, Switzerland; Lombardy, Italy
- Parent range: Bernina Range

Piz Sella is a mountain in the Bernina Range of the Alps, located on the border between Italy and Switzerland. It lies between Piz Glüschaint and Piz Roseg, south of the Roseg Glacier.
