= Piz Fedoz =

Mountain in Switzerland

- Location within Switzerland

Highest point
- Elevation: 3,190 m (10,470 ft)
- Prominence: 207 m (679 ft)
- Parent peak: Piz Fora
- Coordinates: 46°21′35.3″N 9°44′26.4″E

Geography
- Location: Graubünden, Switzerland
- Parent range: Bernina Range

Piz Fedoz (3,190 m) is a mountain in the Bernina Range of the Alps, located south of the Maloja Pass in the canton of Graubünden. It lies on the range between the Val Forno and the Val Fedoz.
