= Munt Arlas =

Mountain in Switzerland

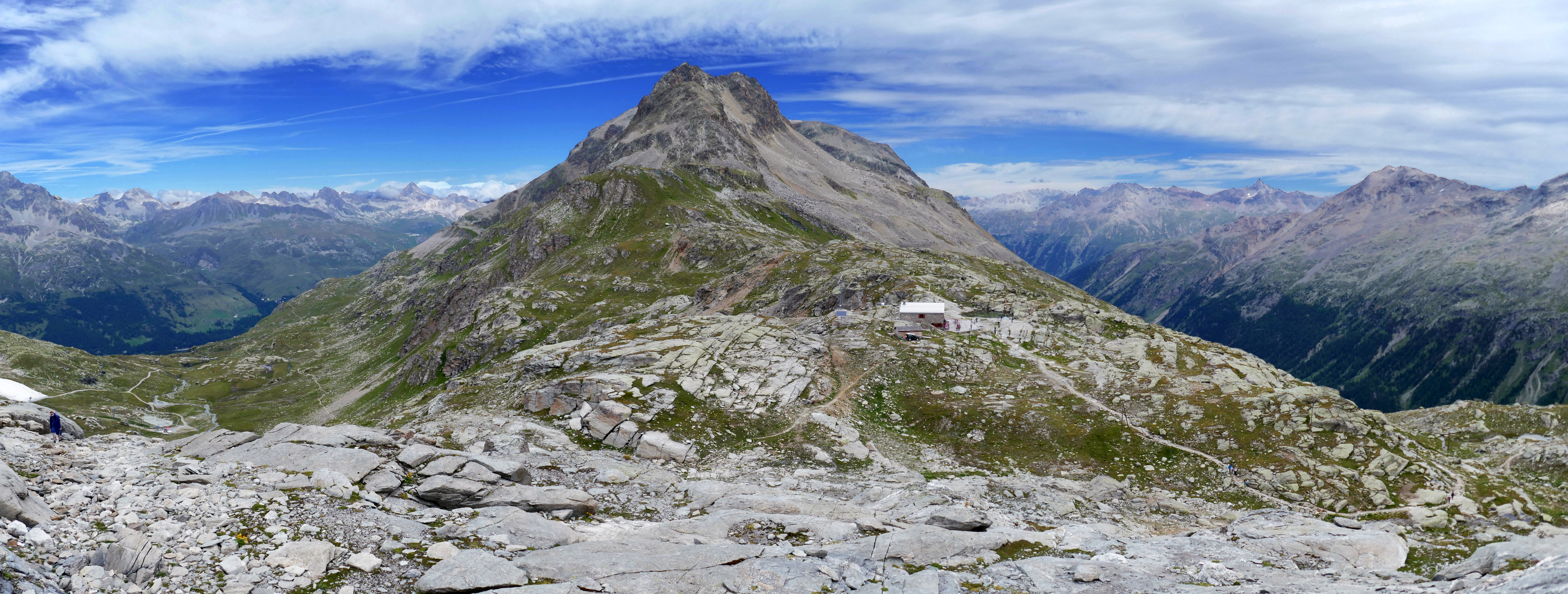

Highest point
- Elevation: 3,127 m (10,259 ft)
- Prominence: 143 m (469 ft)
- Parent peak: Piz Surlej
- Coordinates: 46°26′36″N 9°50′34″E

Geography
- Location within Switzerland
- Location: Graubünden, Switzerland
- Parent range: Bernina Range

Munt Arlas (3,127 m) is a mountain in the Bernina Range of the Alps, overlooking Lake Silvaplana in the Swiss canton of Graubünden. It lies south of Piz Surlej, on the range between the main Inn valley and the Val Roseg.
