= Piz Salatschina =

Mountain in Switzerland

- Location within Switzerland

Highest point
- Elevation: 2,824 m (9,265 ft)
- Prominence: 72 m (236 ft)
- Coordinates: 46°22′16.2″N 9°46′01″E

Geography
- Location: Graubünden, Switzerland
- Parent range: Bernina Range

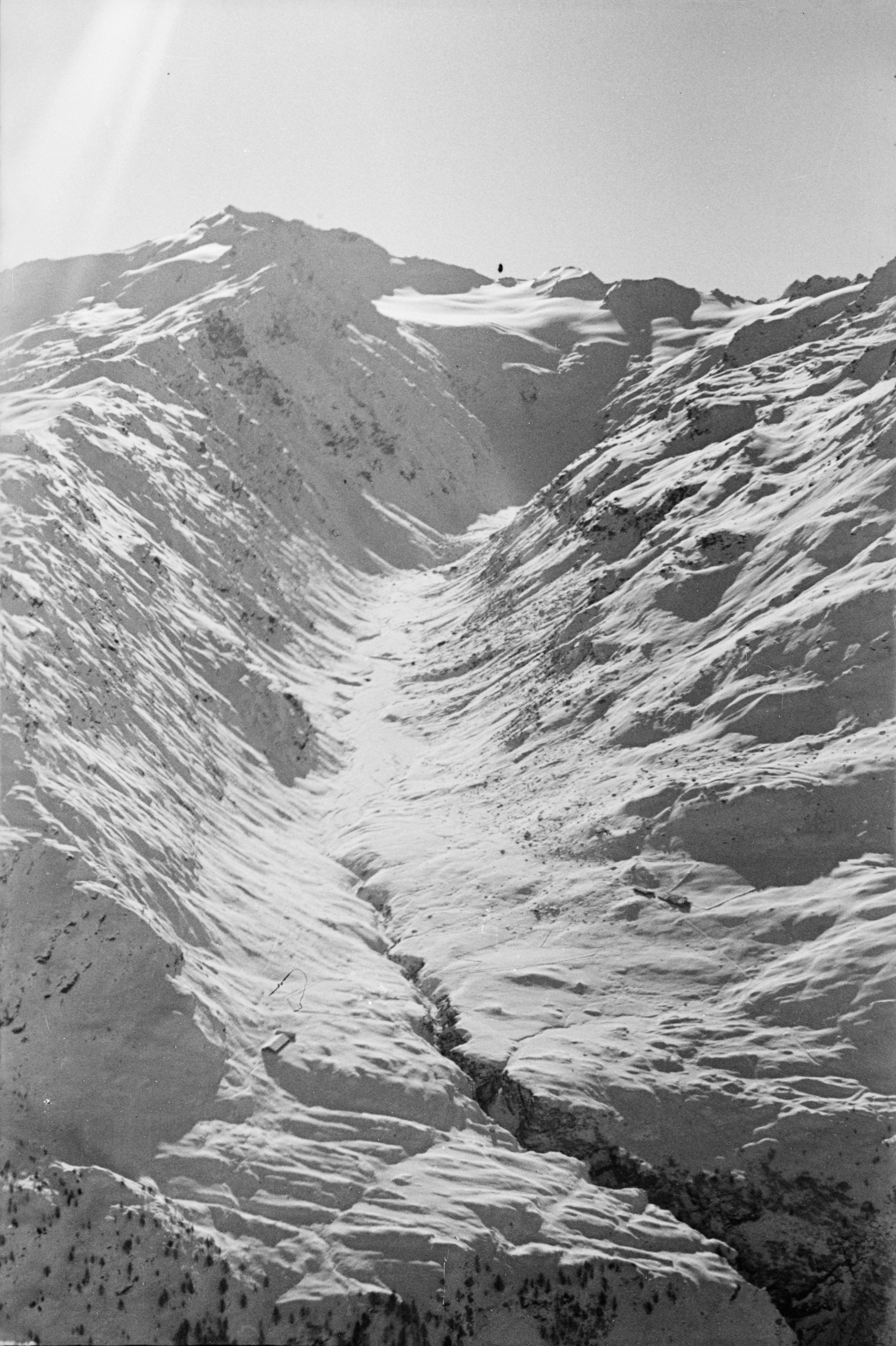
Val Fedoz with Piz Saletschina and Piz Fora

Piz Salatschina is a mountain in the Bernina Range of the Alps, located south of Sils im Engadin/Segl in the canton of Graubünden. It lies north of Piz Fora, between the Val Fedoz and the Val Fex.
