= Piz Rosatsch =

Mountain in Switzerland

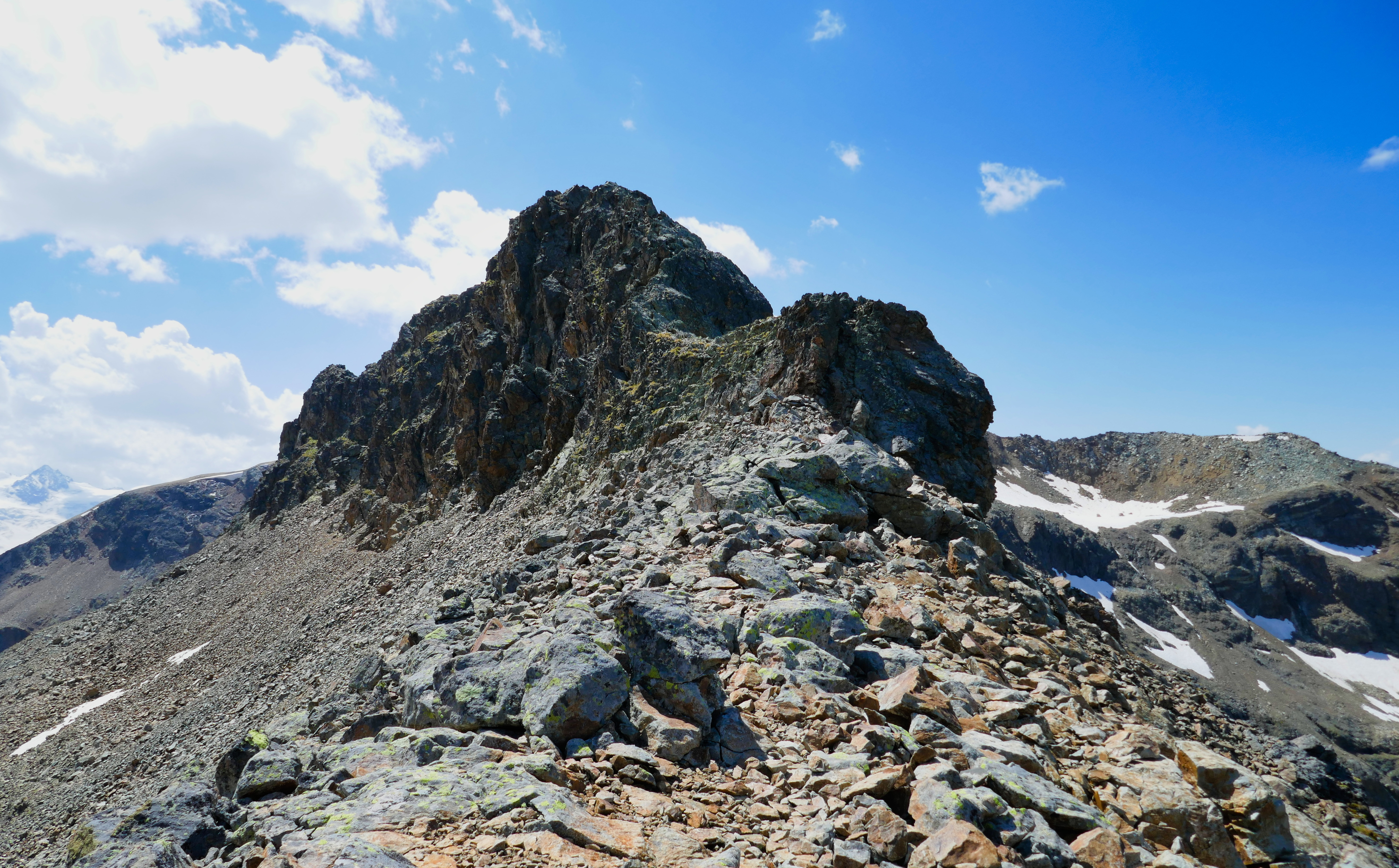

Highest point
- Elevation: 3,123 m (10,246 ft)
- Prominence: 28 m (92 ft)
- Parent peak: Piz Surlej
- Coordinates: 46°27′36.3″N 9°51′13″E

Geography
- Location within Switzerland
- Location: Graubünden, Switzerland
- Parent range: Bernina Range

Piz Rosatsch is a mountain in the Bernina Range of the Alps, overlooking St. Moritz in the canton of Graubünden. It lies on the range between the main Inn valley and the Val Roseg, north of Piz Corvatsch.
