= Piz Glüschaint =

Mountain in Switzerland

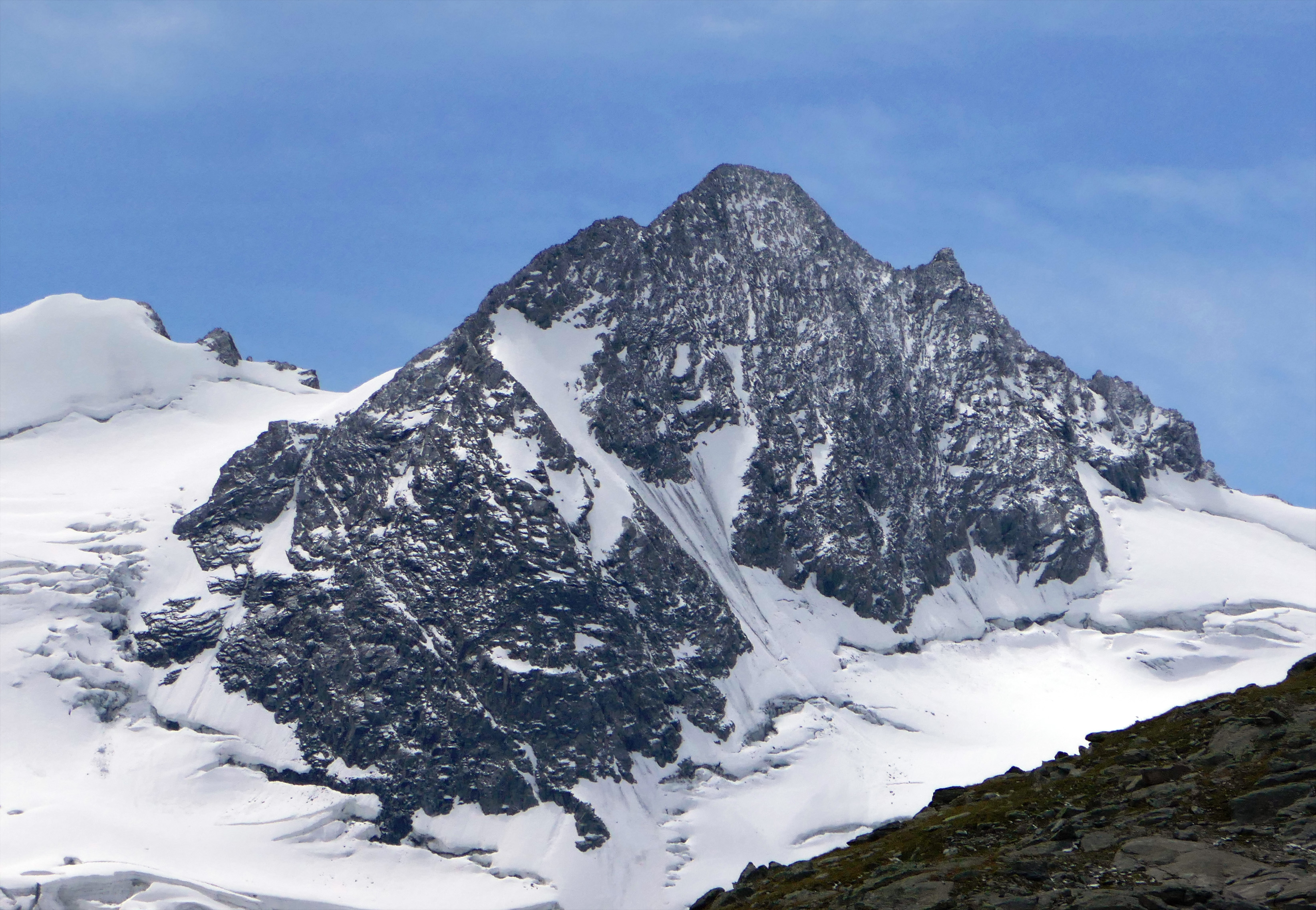

Highest point
- Elevation: 3,594 m (11,791 ft)
- Prominence: 341 m (1,119 ft)
- Parent peak: Piz Bernina
- Listing: List of mountains in Switzerland; Alpine mountains above 3000 m
- Coordinates: 46°21′45″N 9°50′25″E

Geography
- Location within Alps
- Location: Graubünden, Switzerland / Lombardy, Italy
- Parent range: Bernina Range

Piz Glüschaint is a mountain of the Bernina Range (Alps), on the border between Italy and Switzerland. It lies between the Val Roseg (Graubünden) and the Val Malenco (Lombardy). On its northern side is the Roseg Glacier.

== See also ==
- List of mountains of Switzerland
