= Bernina Range =

Mountain range in Switzerland and Italy

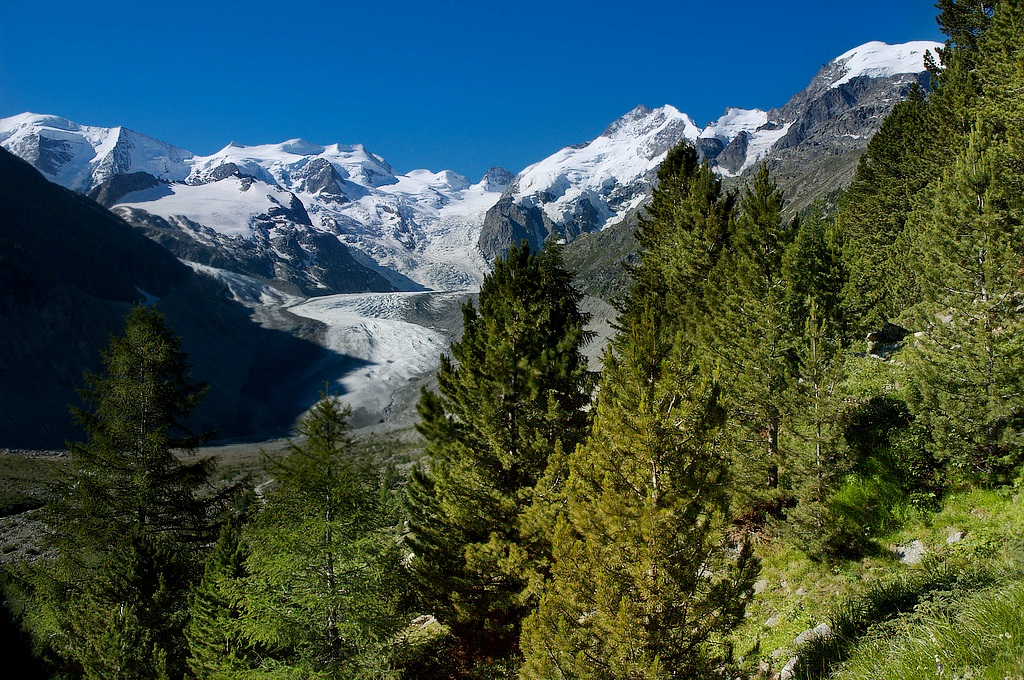
- The main summits of the Bernina range above the Morteratsch Glacier

Highest point
- Peak: Piz Bernina
- Elevation: 4,049 m (13,284 ft)
- Listing: Mountain ranges
- Coordinates: 46°37′N 09°52′E

Geography
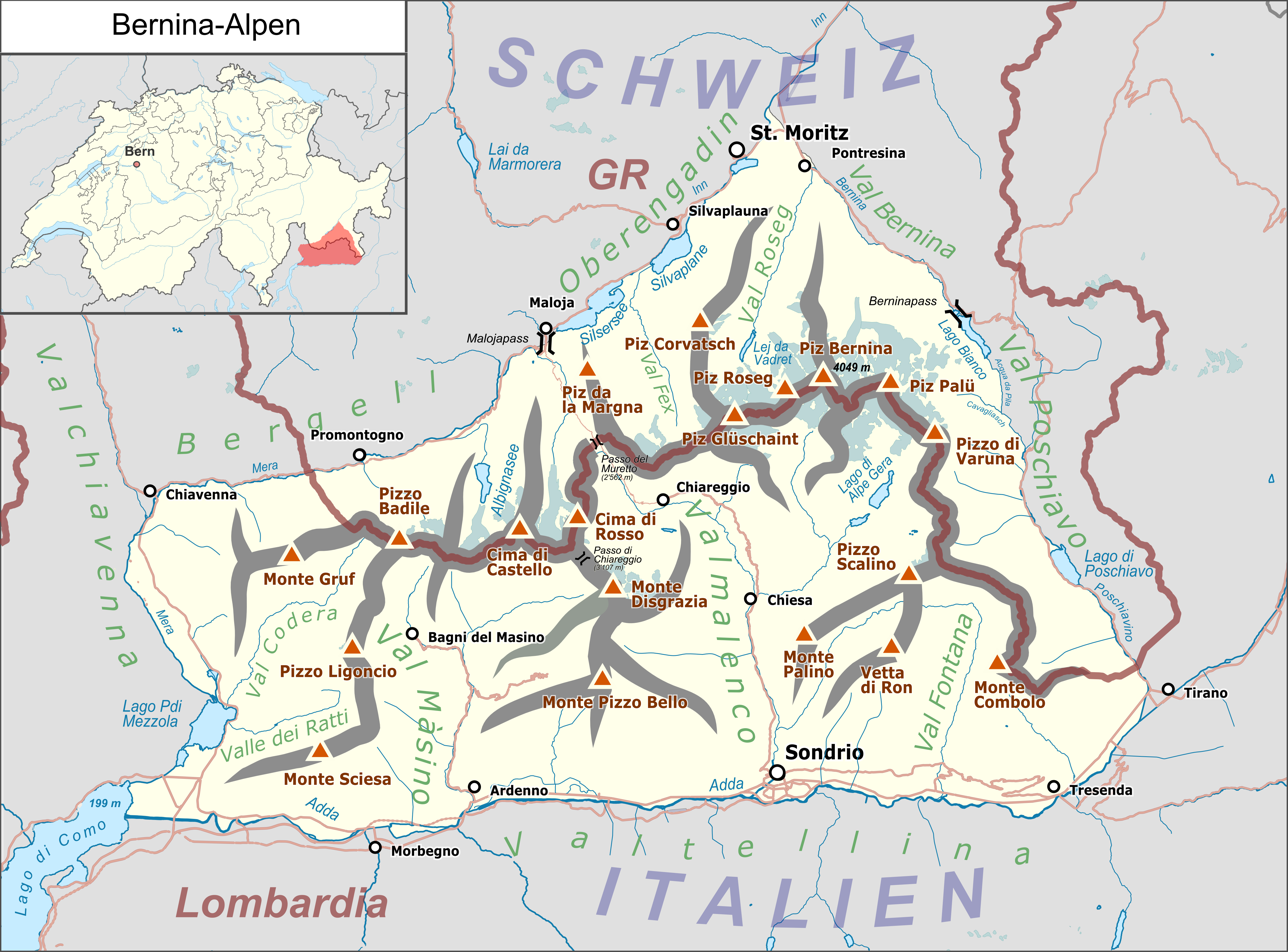
- Location of the Bernina Alps; The borders of the range according to Alpine Club classification of the Eastern Alps
- Countries: Switzerland; Italy
- Range coordinates: 46°22.8′N 9°54.6′E
- Parent range: Western Limestone Alps
- Borders on: Albula Range; Livigno Range; Bergamo Alps; Bregaglia Range

The Bernina Range is a mountain range in the Alps of eastern Switzerland and northern Italy. It is considered to be part of the Rhaetian Alps within the Central Eastern Alps. It is one of the highest ranges of the Alps, covered with many glaciers. Piz Bernina (4,049 m (13,284 ft)), its highest peak, is the most easterly four-thousand-metre peak in the Alps. The peak in the range which sees the most ascents is Piz Palü.

The Bernina Range is separated from the Albula Range in the north-west by the Maloja Pass and the Upper Engadin valley; from the Livigno Range in the east by the Bernina Pass; from the Bergamo Alps in the south by the Adda valley (Valtellina); and from the Bregaglia Range in the south-west by the Muretto Pass. The Bernina Range is drained by the rivers Adda, Inn and Maira (Mera in Italy).

The term Bernina Alps can also be used in an extended sense to include both the Bernina and Bregaglia ranges; this is the area coloured red on the map (right) and labelled 'Bernina Alpen'.

== Peaks ==
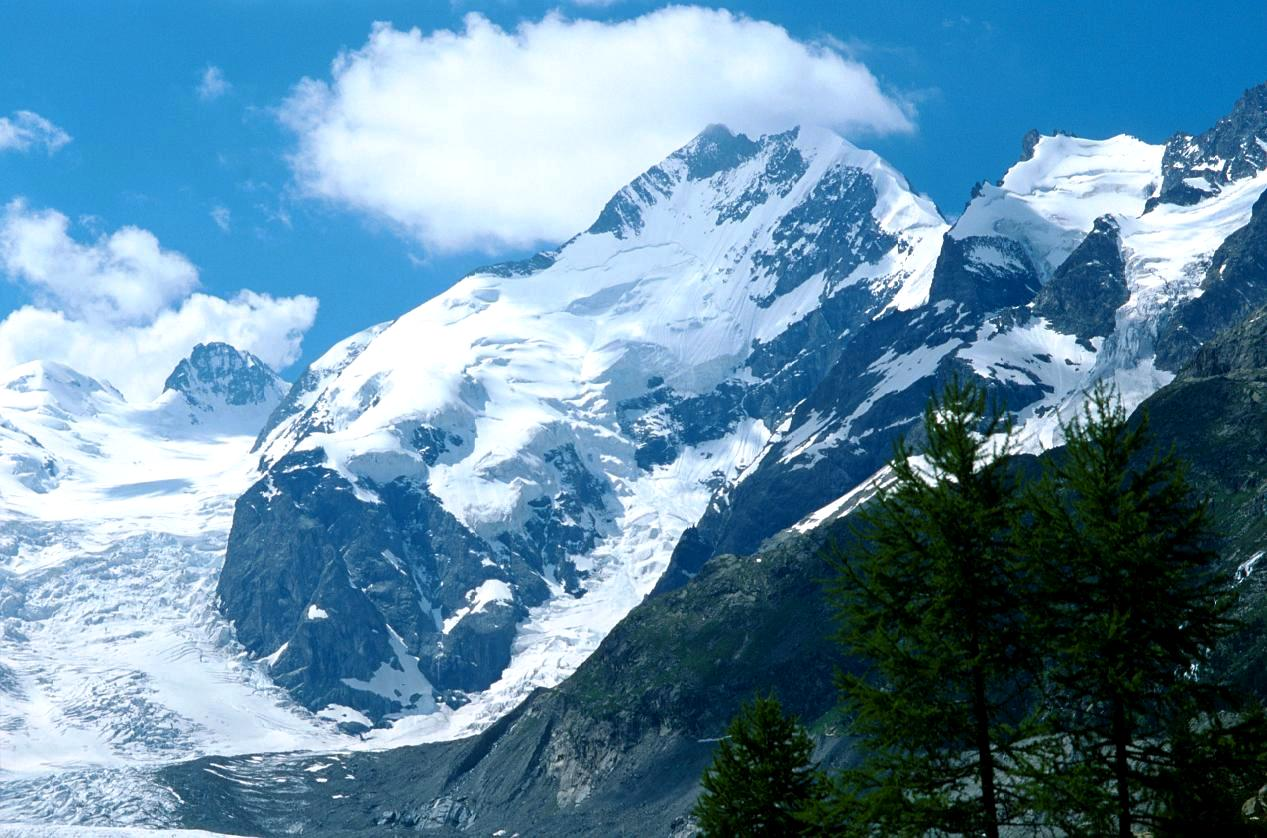
Piz Bernina

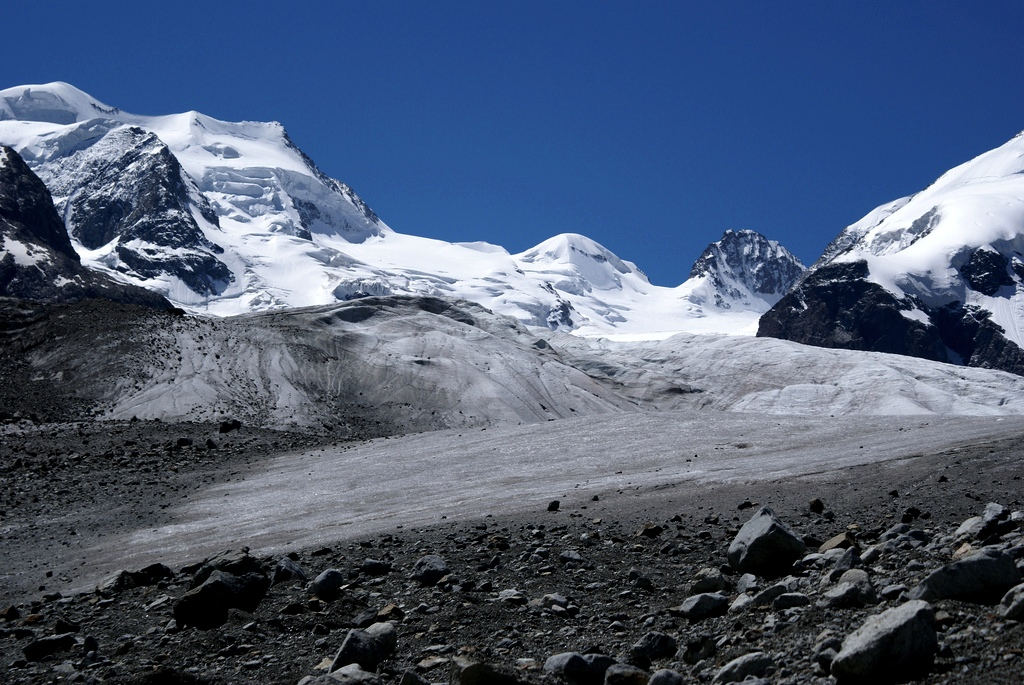
Morteratsch Glacier

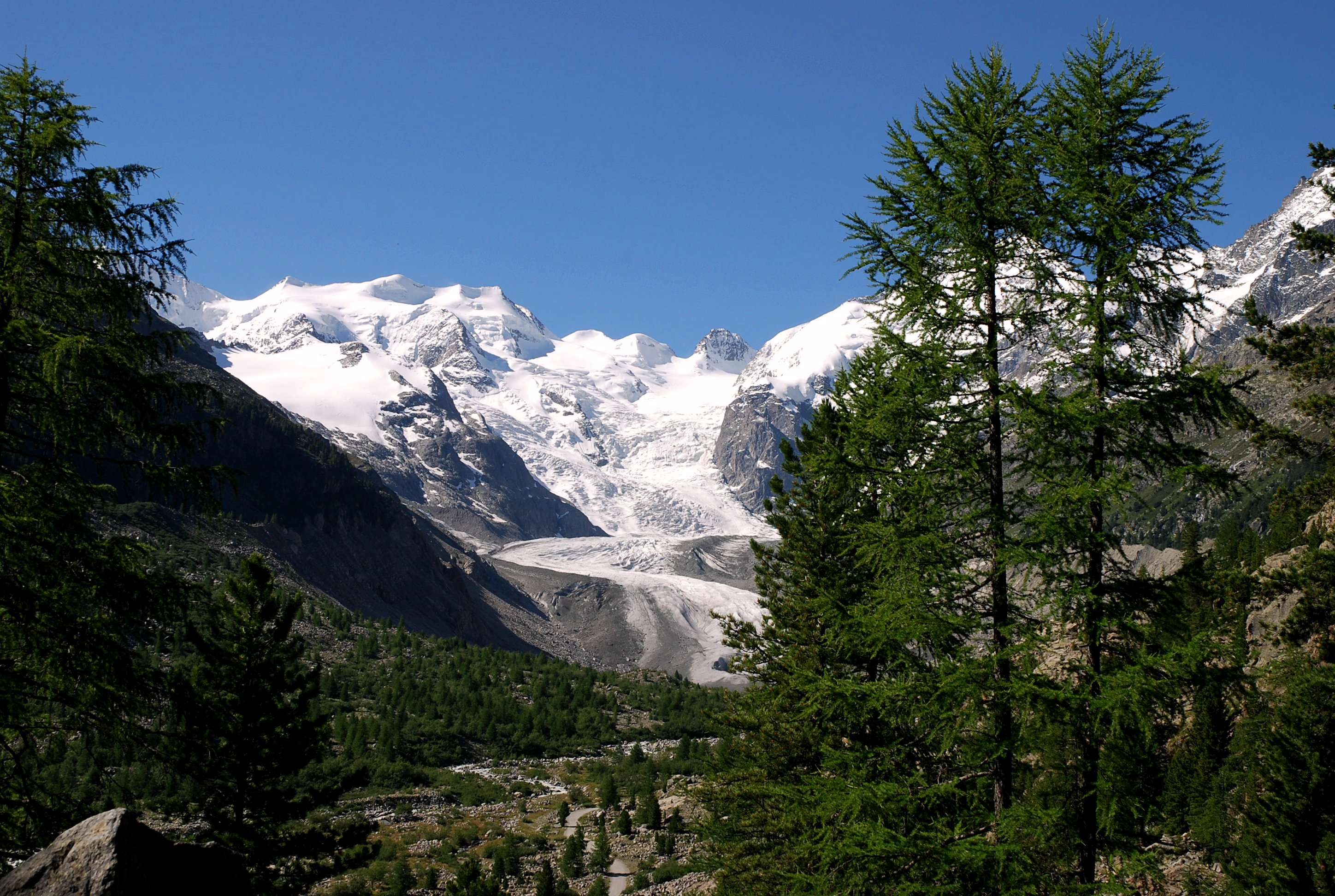
Bellavista (left)

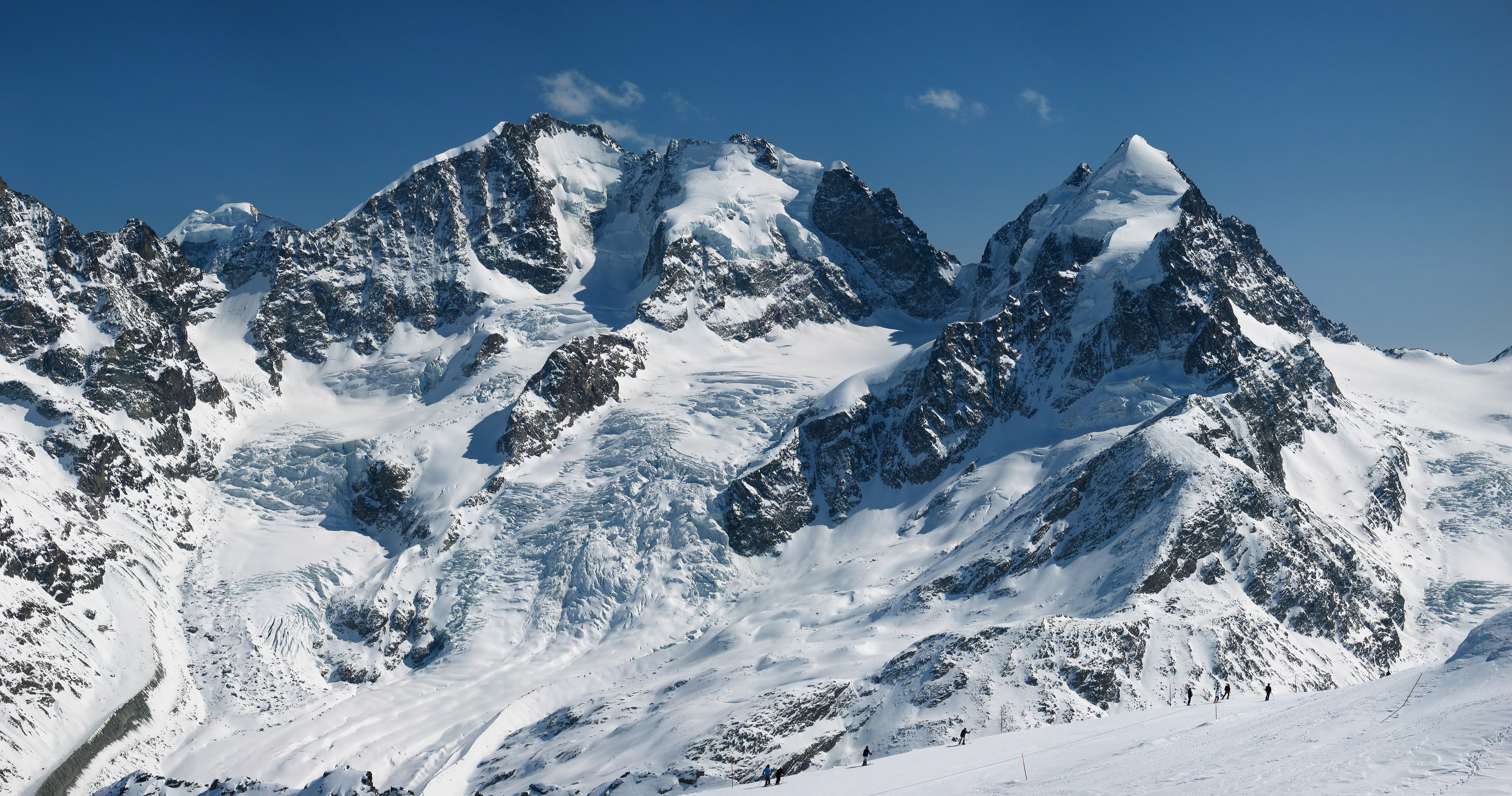
Piz Bernina and Piz Roseg

The main peaks of the Bernina Range are:

Peak	Elevation (m/ft)	
Piz Bernina	4,048	13,304
Piz Zupò	3,995	13,110
Piz Bianco	3,993	13,100
Piz Scerscen	3,970	13,028
Piz Argient	3,943	12,943
Piz Roseg	3,935	12,916
Bellavista	3,921	12,867
Piz Palü	3,899	12,835
Crast' Agüzza	3,870	12,694
Piz Morteratsch	3,751	12,306
Piz Cambrena	3,606	11,831
Piz Glüschaint	3,594	11,791
Piz Tschierva	3,546	11,634
Piz Sella	3,506	11,503
Piz Varuna	3,462	11,359
Piz Corvatsch	3,451	11,322
Piz Tremoggia	3,441	11,289
Cima di Castello	3,400	11,155
Piz Fora	3,363	11,033
Pizzo Scalino	3,323	10,903
Punta Painale	3,246	10,650
Pizzo Cassandra	3,226	10,584
Munt Pers	3,207	10,522
Piz Surlej	3,188	10,459
Piz da la Margna	3,158	10,361
Vetta di Ron	3,137	10,292
Munt Arlas	3,127	10,259
Piz Rosatsch	3,123	10,246
Piz Salatschina	2,824	9,265
Corna Mara	2,807	9,209

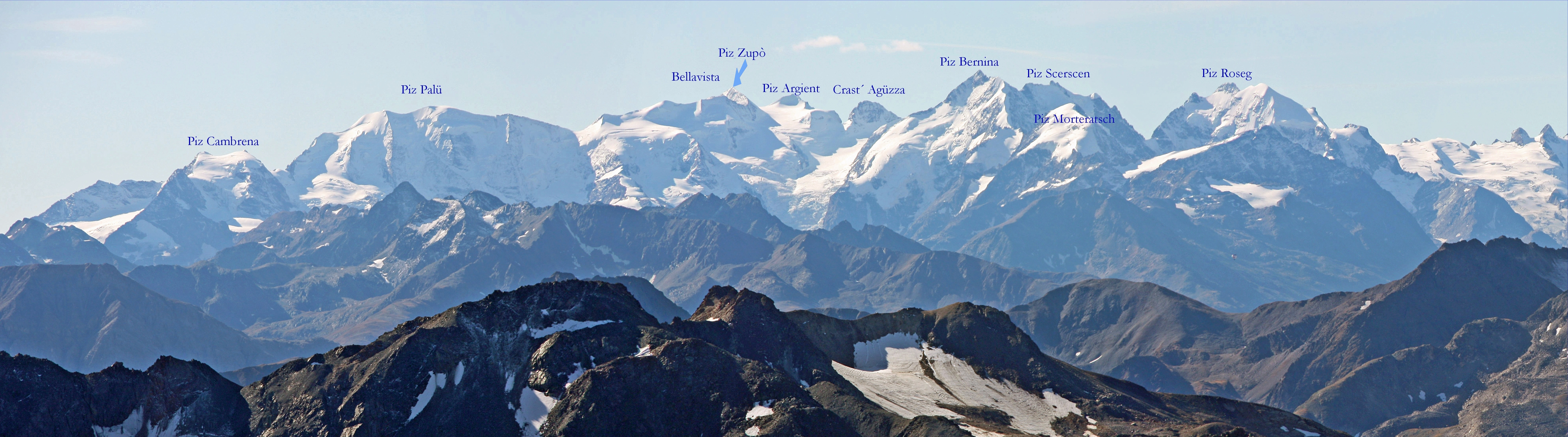
A panorama of the Bernina Range from Flüela-Schwarzhorn

== Glaciers ==
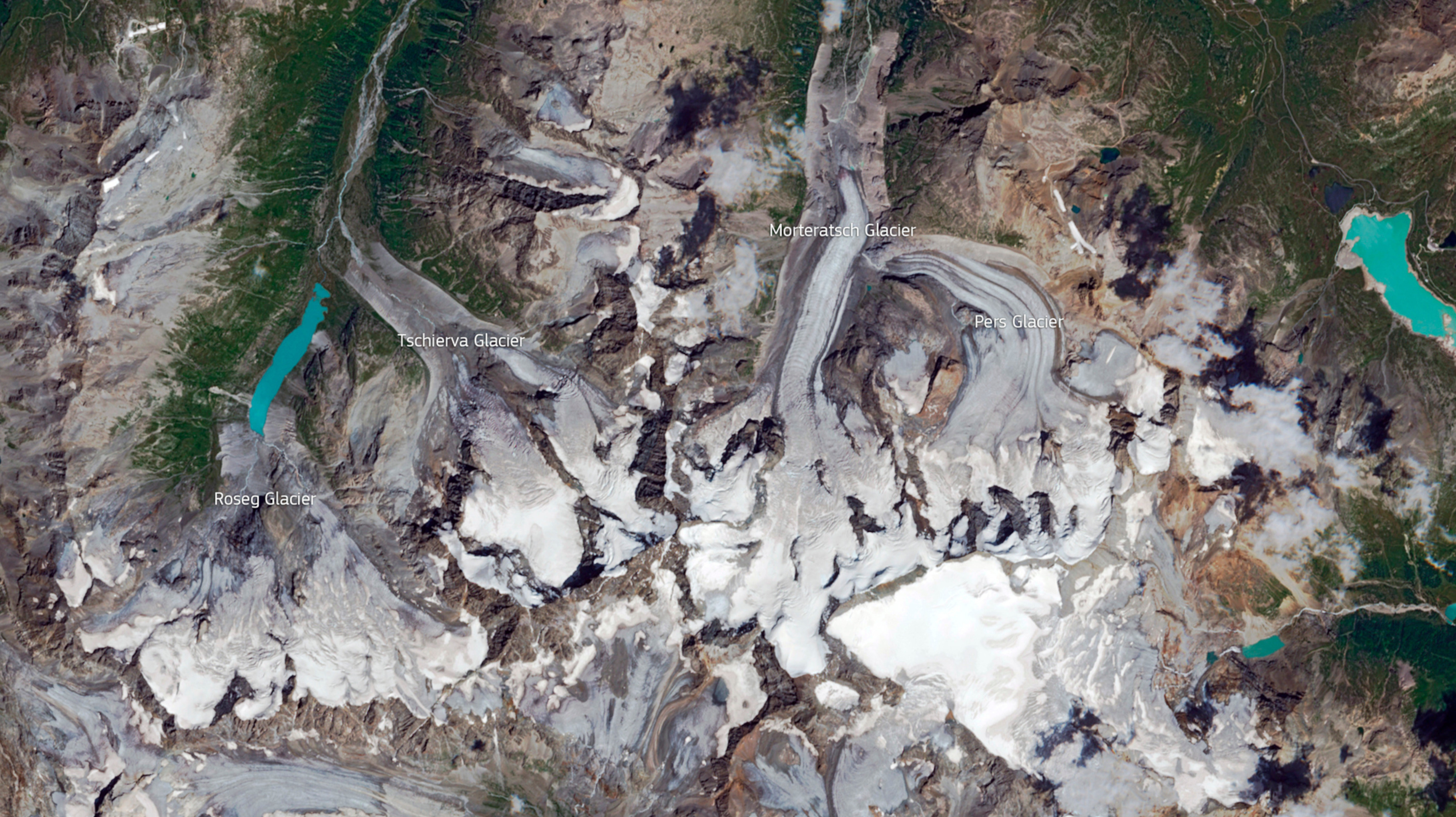
A satellite image of 4 of the glaciers.

Main glaciers :

- Morteratsch Glacier
- Roseg Glacier
- Pers Glacier
- Tschierva Glacier
- Palü Glacier
- Scerscen Superiore Glacier
- Scerscen Inferiore Glacier
- Fellaria Glacier

== Passes ==
The main passes of the Bernina Range are:

Mountain pass	location	type	Elevation (m/ft)	
Fuorcla Bellavista	Pontresina to Chiesa in Valmalenco	snow	3684	12,087
Fuorcla Crast' Agüzza	Pontresina to Chiesa in Valmalenco	snow	3601	11,814
Fuorcla Tschierva	Pontresina to Chiesa in Valmalenco	snow	3527	11,572
Fuorcla Sella	Pontresina to Chiesa in Valmalenco	snow	3304	10,840
Passo di Bondo	Bondo to Bagni di Masino	snow	3117	10,227
Passo di Castello	Maloja to Morbegno	snow	3100	10,171
Passo Tremoggia	Sils to Chiesa in Valmalenco	snow	3021	9912
Passo di Mello	Chiareggio to Val Masino	snow	2991	9813
Diavolezza Pass	Bernina road to the Morteratsch glacier	snow	2977	9767
Passo di Zocca	Vicosoprano to Val Masino	snow	2743	9000
Muretto Pass	Maloja to Chiesa	partly snow	2557	8389
Bernina Pass	Pontresina to Tirano	road	2330	7645
Maloja Pass	St Moritz to Chiavenna	road	1809	5935

== Mountain huts ==
There are several manned and unmanned mountain huts in the Bernina Range.

Name	Elevation (m/ft)	Country	Location
Chamanna da Coaz	2610 / 8,563	Switzerland	End of Val Roseg
Chamanna da Boval	2495 / 8,186	Switzerland	Val Morteratsch, under Piz Morteratsch
Chamanna da Tschierva	2583 / 8,474	Switzerland	Left side of Vadret Tschierva, under Piz Morteratsch
Rifugio Marco e Rosa	3597 / 10,801	Italy	

== See also ==
- Swiss Alps
