= Muretto Pass =

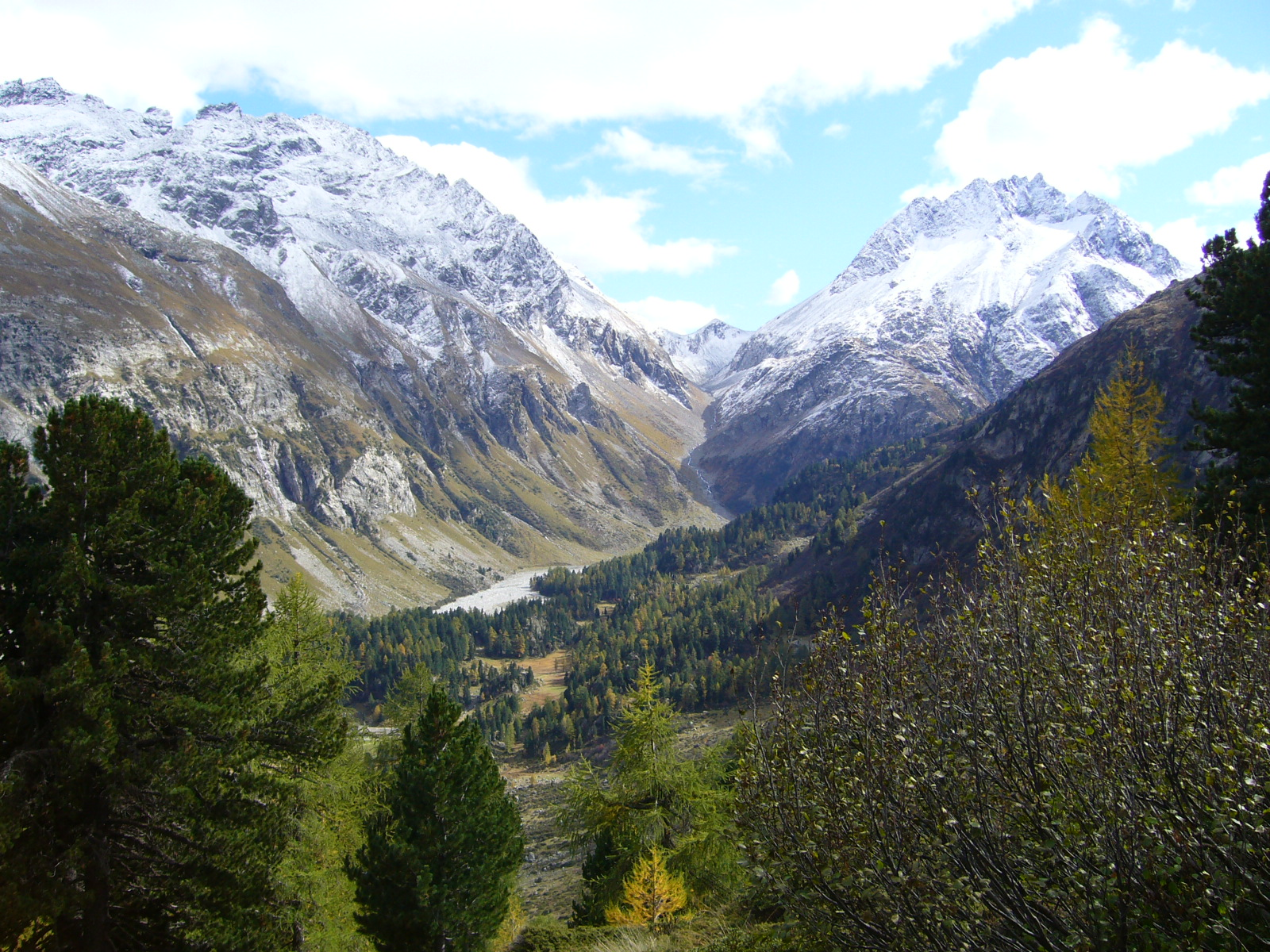
- Muretto Pass (background from the Val Forno

- Location within Alps
- Elevation: 2,562 metres (8,406 ft)
- Traversed by: Trail

Third Approach
- Location: Graubünden, Switzerland; Lombardy, Italy
- Range: Alps
- Coordinates: 46°20′56″N 09°44′02″E

The Muretto Pass (Italian: Passo del Muretto) (2,562 m) is a high mountain pass in the Alps on the border between Switzerland and Italy. It connects Maloja in the Swiss canton of Graubünden with Chiesa in Valmalenco in the Italian region of Lombardy. The pass lies between Monte del Forno (Bregaglia Range) and Piz Fedoz (Bernina Range).

The pass is traversed by a trail.

== See also ==
- Muretto Pass on Hikr
