= Piz Varuna =

Mountain in Switzerland

- North-east side

Highest point
- Elevation: 3,453 m (11,329 ft)
- Prominence: 222 m (728 ft)
- Parent peak: Piz Bernina
- Coordinates: 46°21′08″N 9°59′35″E

Geography
- Location within Alps
- Location: Graubünden, Switzerland; Lombardy, Italy
- Parent range: Bernina Range

Piz Varuna (3,453 m) is a mountain in the Bernina Range of the Alps, located on the border between Italy and Switzerland. It lies east of Piz Palü, between the Val Poschiavo and the Val Malenco.
