= Vetta di Ron =

Mountain in Italy

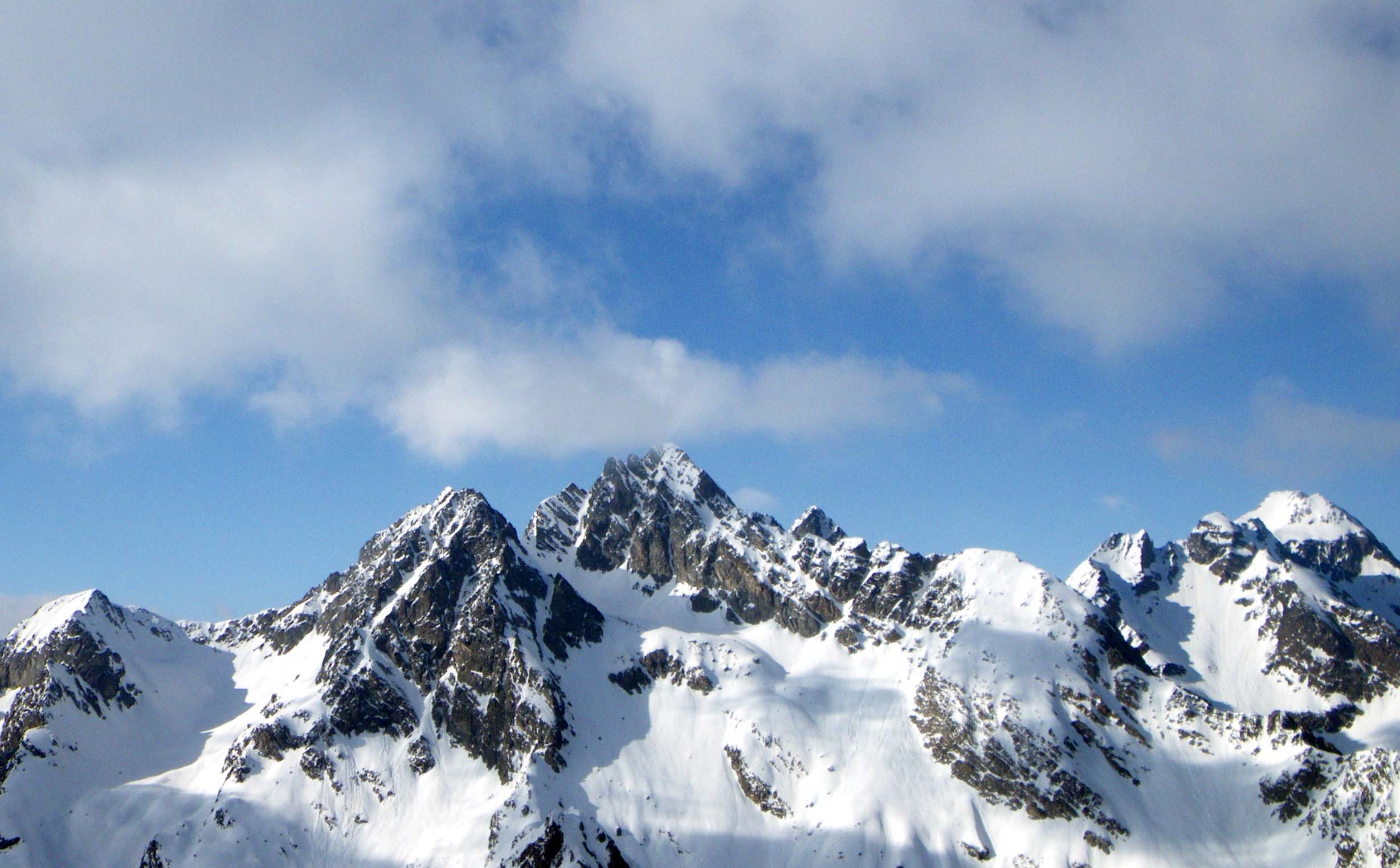
- Vetta di Ron.

Highest point
- Elevation: 3,137 m (10,292 ft)
- Coordinates: 46°15′14″N 9°58′24″E

Geography
- Location within Lombardy
- Country: Italy
- Region: Lombardy
- Parent range: Bernina Range

Vetta di Ron is a mountain of Lombardy, Italy. It has an elevation of 3,137 metres (10,292 ft) above sea level.
