= Tschierva Hut =

Coordinates: 46.4039°N 9.88013°E

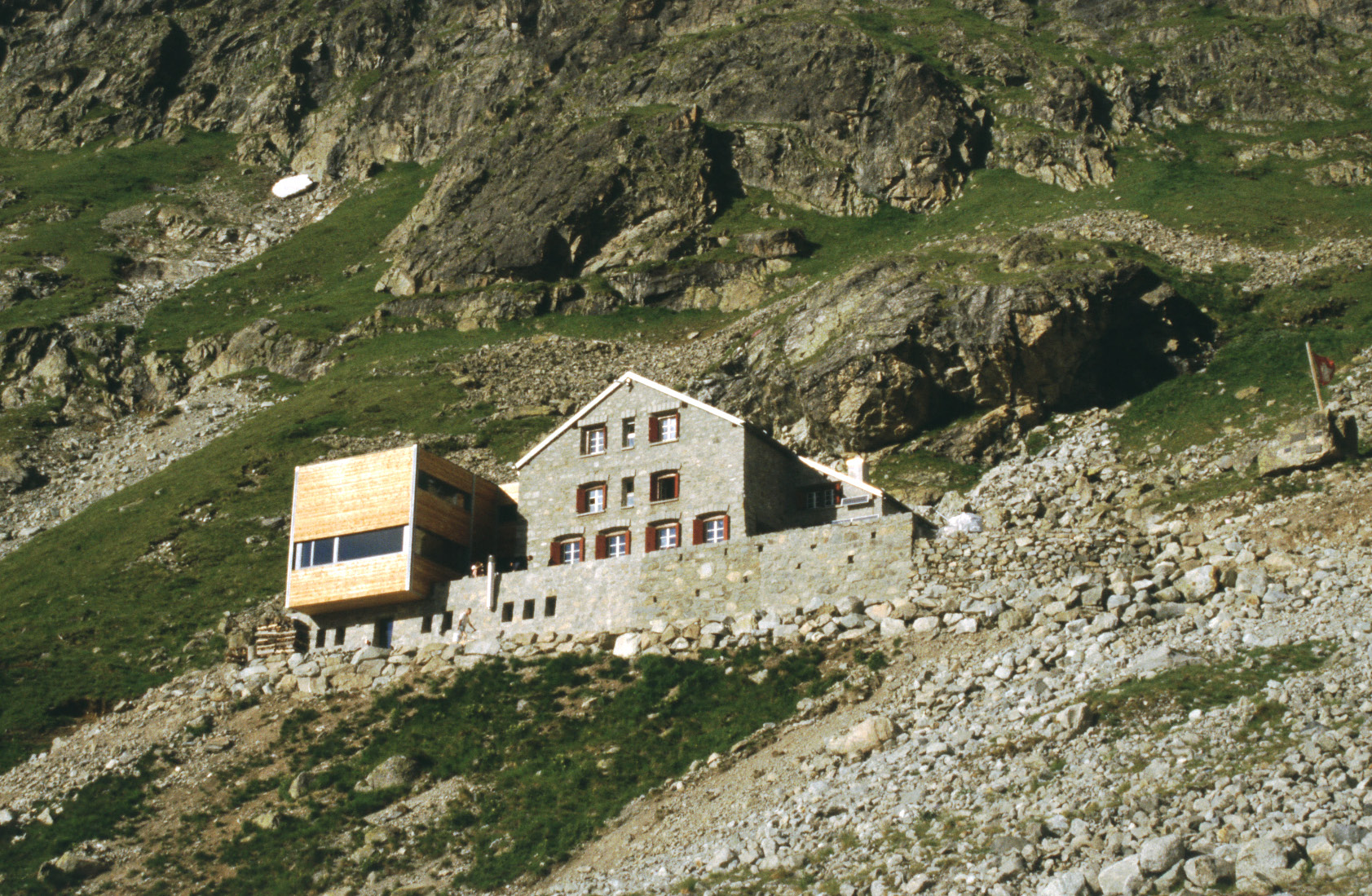
Tschierva Hut from ascent

The Tschierva Hut (German: Tschiervahütte, Romansh: Chamanna da Tschierva) is a mountain hut located in the Swiss canton of Graubünden at the foot of Piz Bernina, Piz Tschierva and Piz Morteratsch at the end of Val Roseg. The hut lies at 2,584 metres above sea level near the Tschierva Glacier and can be accessed from Pontresina via a trail. The hut is the starting point of the Biancograt, the serpentine north ridge of Piz Bernina.

The hut is owned by the Swiss Alpine Club.
