= Piz Cambrena =

Mountain in Switzerland

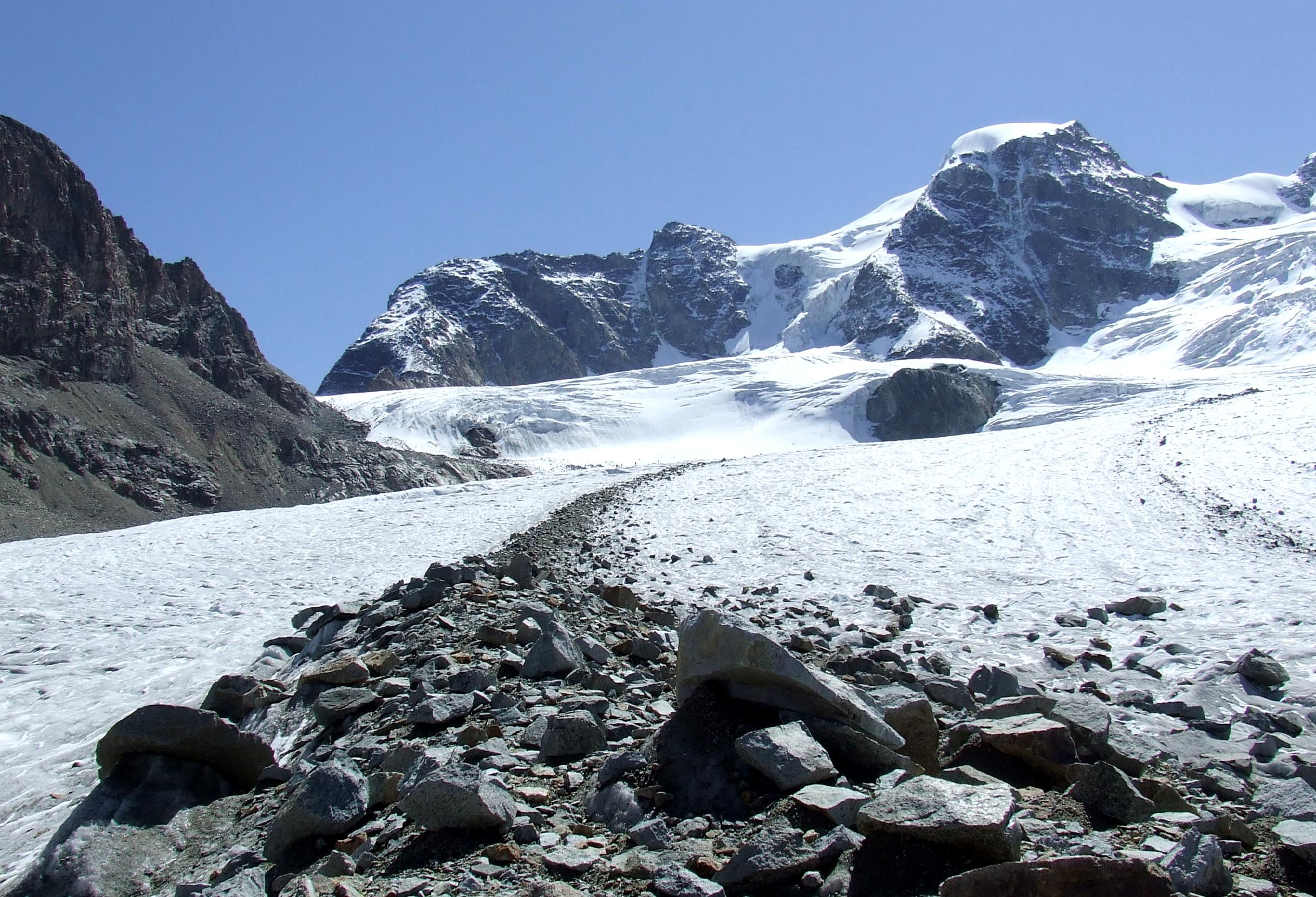
- Piz Cambrena from Pers Glacier

Highest point
- Elevation: 3,606 m (11,831 ft)
- Prominence: 158 m (518 ft)
- Parent peak: Piz Bernina
- Coordinates: 46°23′15.5″N 09°58′52.1″E

Geography
- Location within Switzerland
- Location: Graubünden, Switzerland
- Parent range: Bernina Range

Piz Cambrena is a mountain in the Bernina Range of the Alps, overlooking the Lago Bianco in the canton of Graubünden. It is situated between Piz Palü and the Bernina Pass.
