= Lej da Vadret =

Lake below Roseg Glacier in the Grisons (the Canton of the Grisons), Switzerland

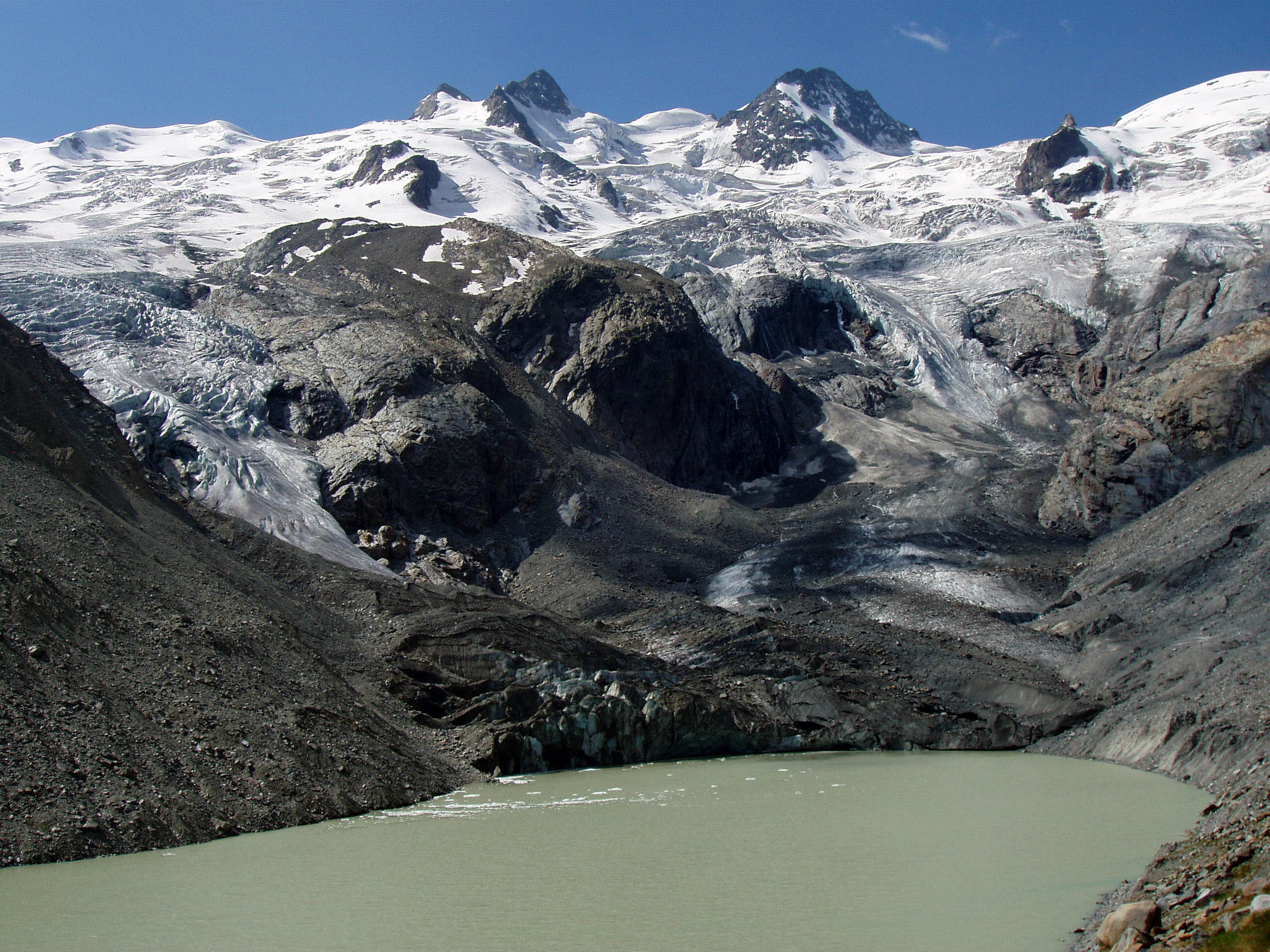

- Location within Canton of Graubünden Location within Switzerland Location within Italy Location within Alps
- Interactive map of Lej da Vadret
- Location: Grisons
- Coordinates: 46°24′00″N 9°50′57″E
- Primary outflows: Rosegbach (Ova da Roseg)
- Basin countries: Switzerland
- Max. length: 1.5 km (0.93 mi)
- Max. width: 300 m (980 ft)
- Surface area: 0.43 km^{2} (0.17 sq mi)
- Surface elevation: 2,160 m (7,090 ft)

Lej da Vadret is a lake below Roseg Glacier in the Grisons, Switzerland.

== See also ==
- List of lakes of Switzerland
- List of mountain lakes of Switzerland
