= Piz Scerscen =

Mountain in Switzerland

- Monte Scerscen (Italian)
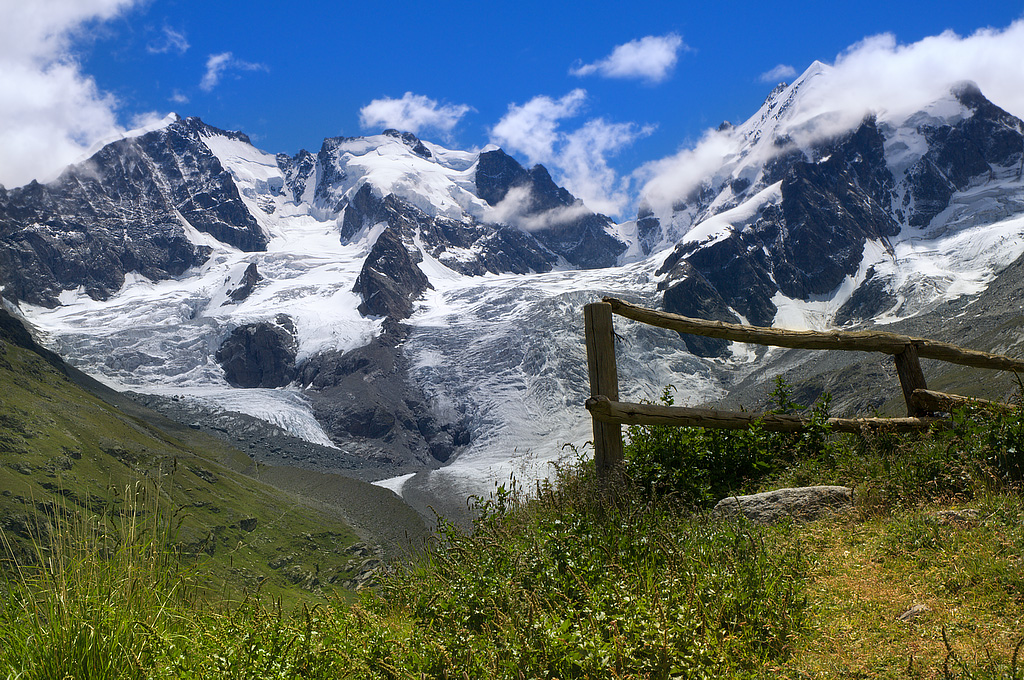
- Piz Bernina (left), Piz Scerscen (centre) and Piz Roseg (right), seen from Val Roseg

Highest point
- Elevation: 3,970 m (13,020 ft)
- Prominence: 88 m (289 ft)
- Parent peak: Piz Bernina
- Coordinates: 46°22′41.7″N 9°54′2.1″E

Naming
- Language of name: Romansh

Geography
- Location within Alps
- Location: Lombardy, Italy; Graubünden, Switzerland
- Parent range: Bernina Range

Climbing
- First ascent: 13 September 1877 by Paul Güssfeldt, Hans Grass and Caspar Capat

Piz Scerscen (Romansh, Italian: Monte Scerscen, formerly Monte Rosso di Scerscen), culminating at 3,970 m above sea level, is one of the highest peaks in the Bernina Range, straddling the border between Switzerland and Italy. It is a satellite peak of Piz Bernina, joining it by its north-east ridge via a 3,882 m pass. Its name means 'the circular mountain' ('Scerscen' is pronounced cherchen).

The mountain has a prominent secondary summit called the Schneehaube (3,875 m).

The first ascent of Piz Scerscen was by Paul Güssfeldt, Hans Grass and Caspar Capat on 13 September 1877 via the north-west spur, descending the same way. This is the well-known Eisnase route, involving a 100-metre ice pitch of between 60 and 70°, although its precise length and steepness are debated. This was the route followed by Walter Risch on the first solo ascent of the mountain in 1924. The first ascent of the north-west face was by Christian Klucker and Ludwig Norman-Neruda on 9 July 1890.
