= Corna Mara =

Mountain in Italy

Coordinates: 46°13′40″N 9°55′50″E

Highest point
- Elevation: 2,807 m (9,209 ft)

Geography
- Location: Lombardy, Italy

Corna Mara is a mountain of Lombardy, Italy, It has an elevation of 2807 metres.
