= Boval Hut =

Mountain hut in Switzerland

Coordinates: 46°24′55″N 9°55′30″E

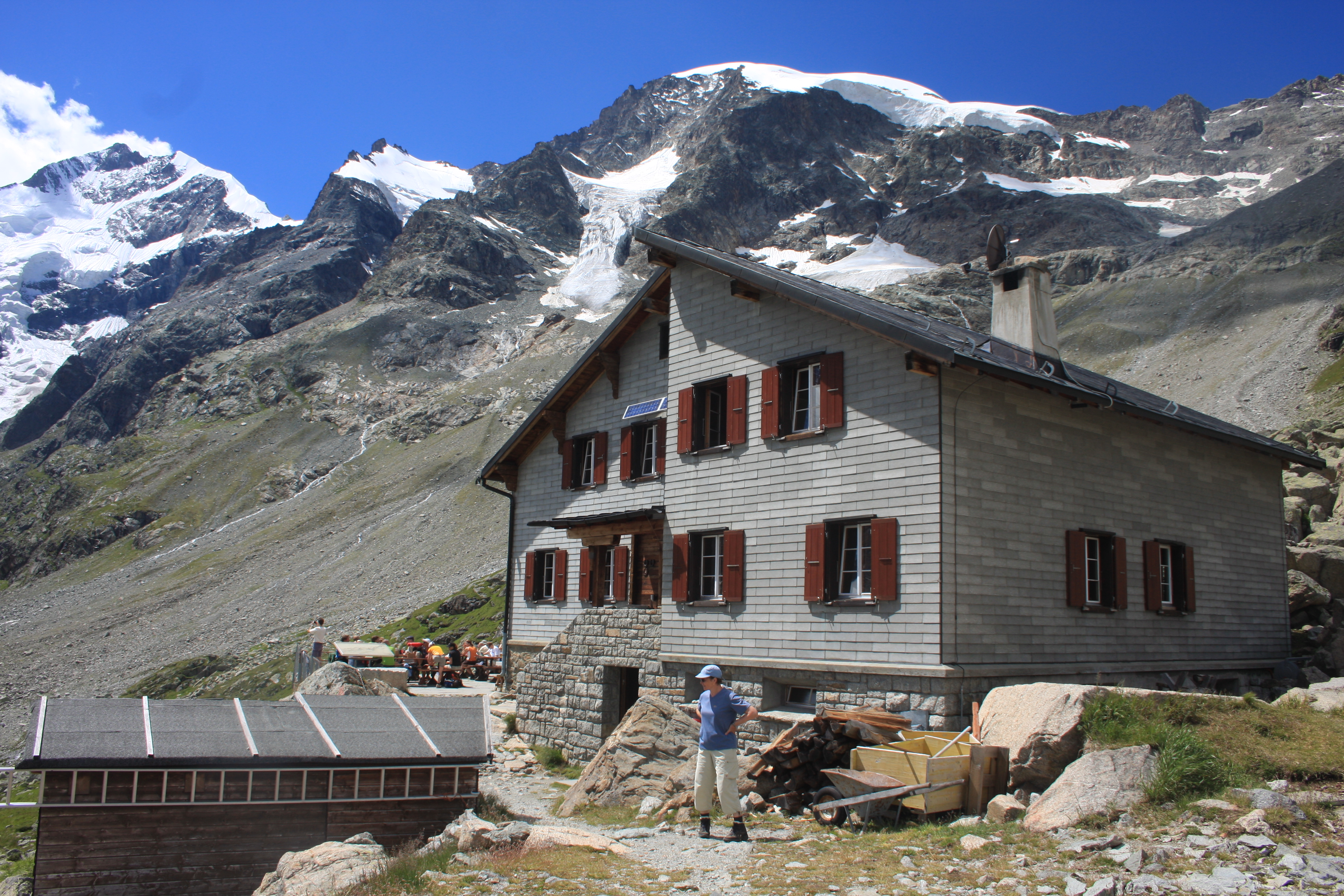
The Boval hut in 2008

The Boval Hut (Romansh: Chamanna da Boval, German: Bovalhütte) is a refuge in the Alps in Switzerland. It lies at the foot of Piz Morteratsch, above the Morteratsch Glacier. The hut has an altitude of 2,495 metres (8,186 ft) above the sea. It was first built in 1918 and expanded in 1978. In need of renovation, an architectural contest was launched to design a replacement for the existing building. The contest received 69 submissions. In 2025, the jury selected a design by the Zurich architectural bureau Mulder Zonderland titled Mauerläufer (lit. 'wall-runner'). Construction is expected to begin in 2027 or 2028.
