= Pizzo Cassandra =

Mountain in Lombardy, Italy

Highest point
- Elevation: 3,226 m (10,584 ft)
- Coordinates: 46°15′41″N 9°46′31″E

Geography
- Location: Lombardy, Italy

Pizzo Cassandra is a mountain located in Lombardy, Italy. It has an elevation of 3,226 metres (10,584 ft).
