= Val Fedoz =

Coordinates: 46.395758°N 9.750399°E

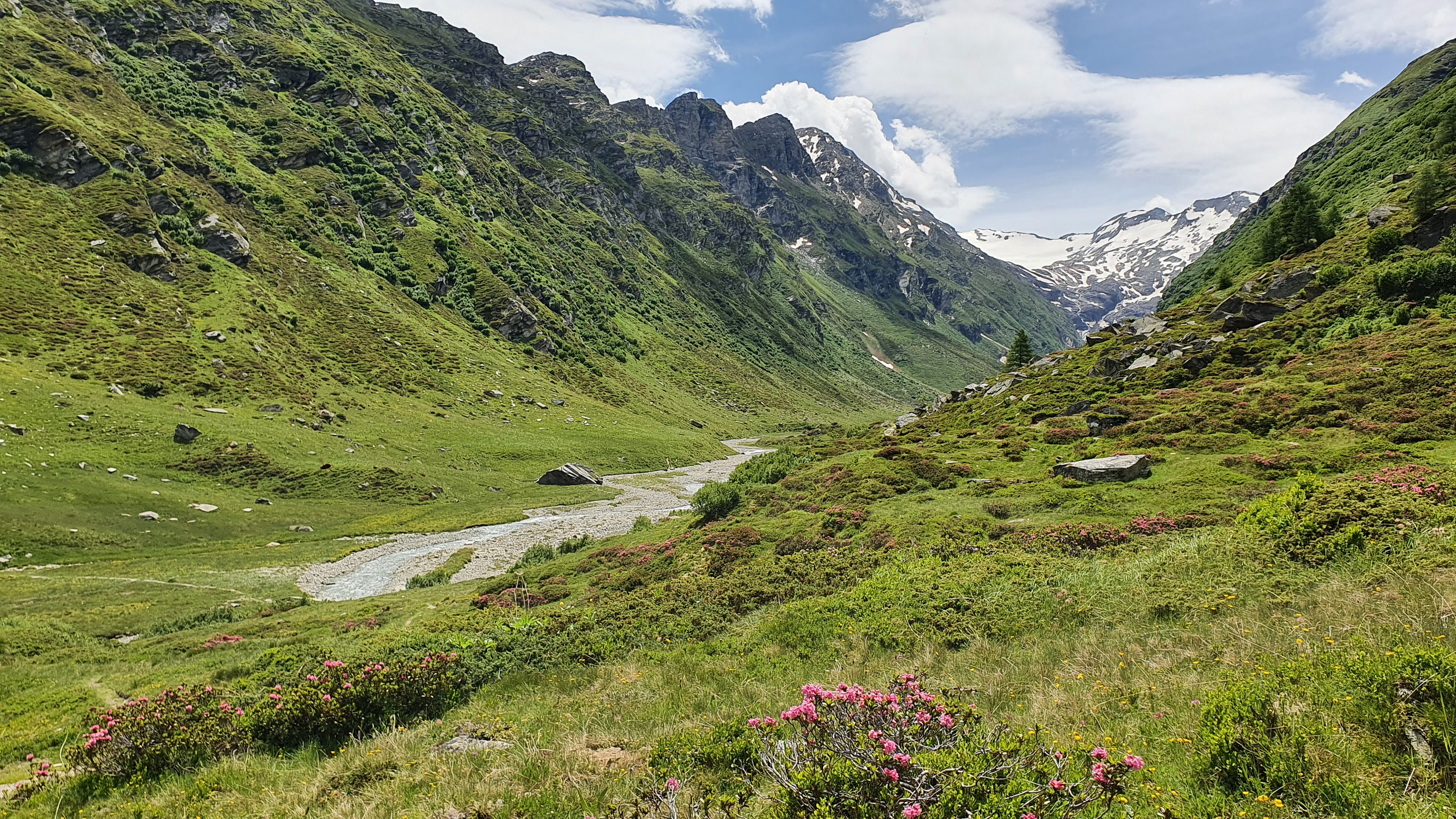
Val Fedoz

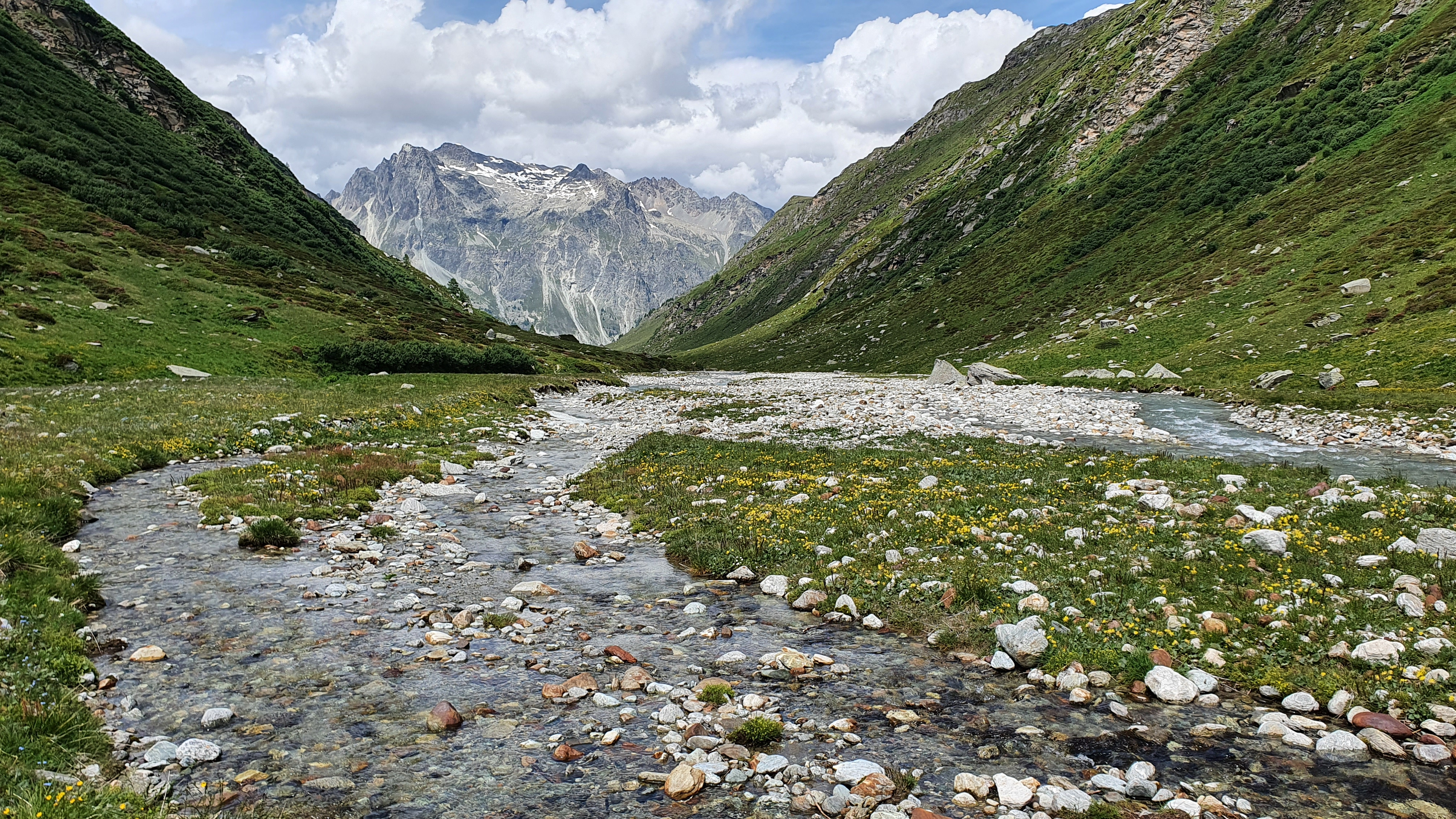
The Aua da Fedoz with its characteristic gravel islands

Val Fedoz is a side valley of the Upper Engadin in the Swiss Canton of Grisons. Politically, it is part of the municipality of Bregaglia.

== Geography ==
Val Fedoz is the parallel valley to the Val Fex further east and separated from it by the Muott'Ota. Unlike the Val Fex, Val Fedoz is uninhabited, almost treeless and very barren. That is why it is also called the "wild brother of the Val Fex". To the west, the valley is separated from the Val Forno by the Piz da la Margna. To the south, the Piz Fora (3,362 m (11,030 ft)) and Monte dell'Oro (3,153 m (10,344 ft)) on the border with Italy form the end of the valley.

The trough-shaped Val Fedoz, cleared by the glacier, opens as a hanging valley with a terrain step into the Upper Engadine, which is about 150 meters lower. Below the glacier Vadrec da Fedoz lies the headwaters of the Aua da Fedoz. Over rocks eroded by the glacier the water first falls 500 meters into the depth and then meanders through the valley. An alluvial area several kilometers long with many gravel islands was created, which is ecologically very valuable.

The valley entrance is flanked on the left and right by two alps, Ca d'Starnam (2,024 m (6,640 ft)) to the west and Petpreir (1,989 m (6,526 ft)) to the east.

== Name ==
Val Fedoz has the same etymology as the neighboring Val Fex: both names derive from feda, "sheep".

== Access ==
On both sides of the Aua da Fedoz hiking trails lead through the valley. They end before the glacier forefield at 2,106 m (6,909 ft) below Motta Salatschina.
