= Piz d'Esan =

Mountain in Switzerland

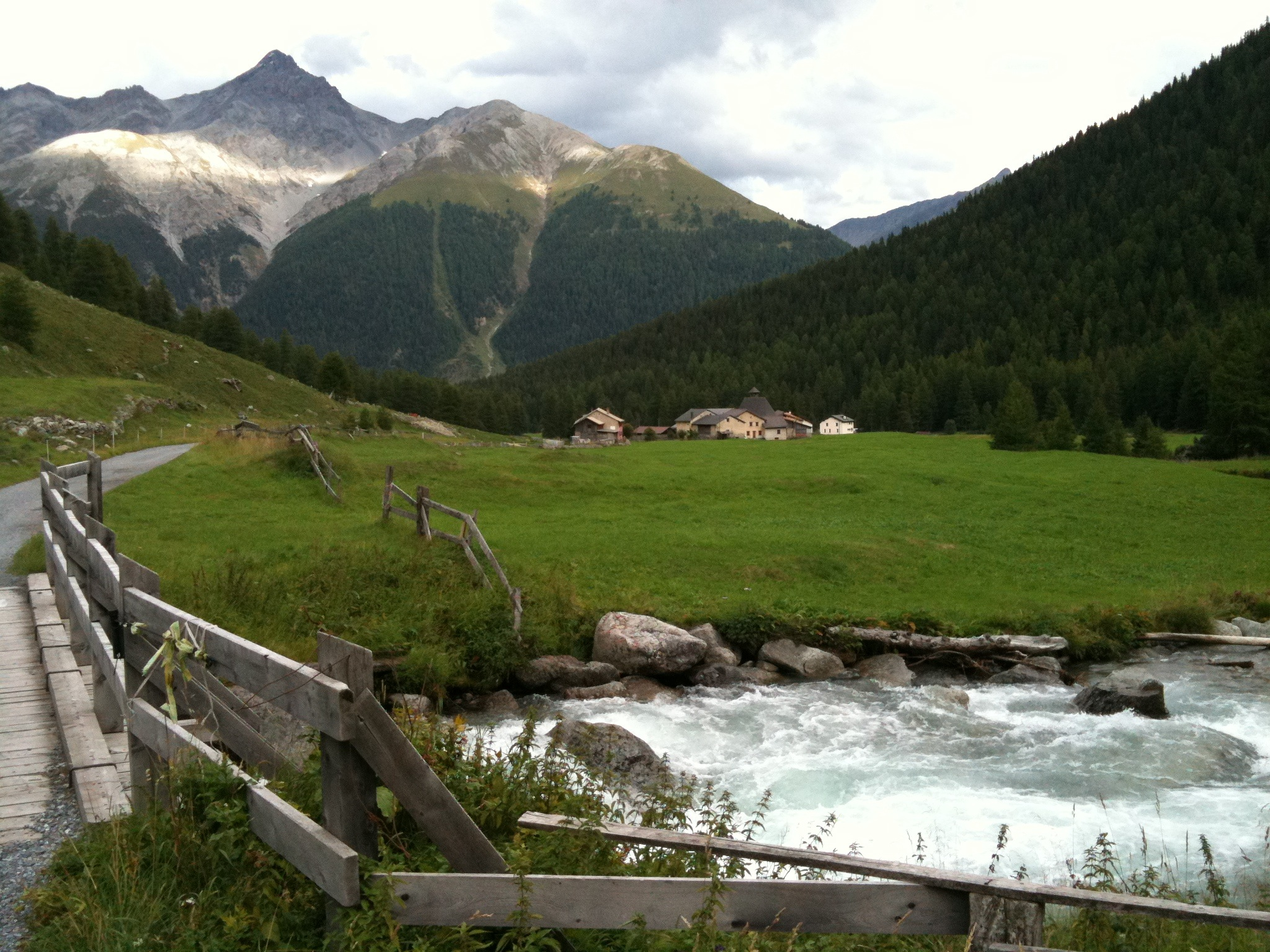
- 2010

Highest point
- Elevation: 3,127 m (10,259 ft)
- Prominence: 235 m (771 ft)
- Parent peak: Piz Languard
- Listing: Mountains of Switzerland
- Coordinates: 46°37′27.3″N 10°03′38″E

Geography
- Location within Switzerland
- Location: Graubünden, Switzerland
- Parent range: Livigno Alps

Piz d'Esan is a mountain of the Livigno Alps, located in Graubünden, Switzerland. It is part of the Swiss National Park.
