= Piz Surlej =

Mountain in Switzerland

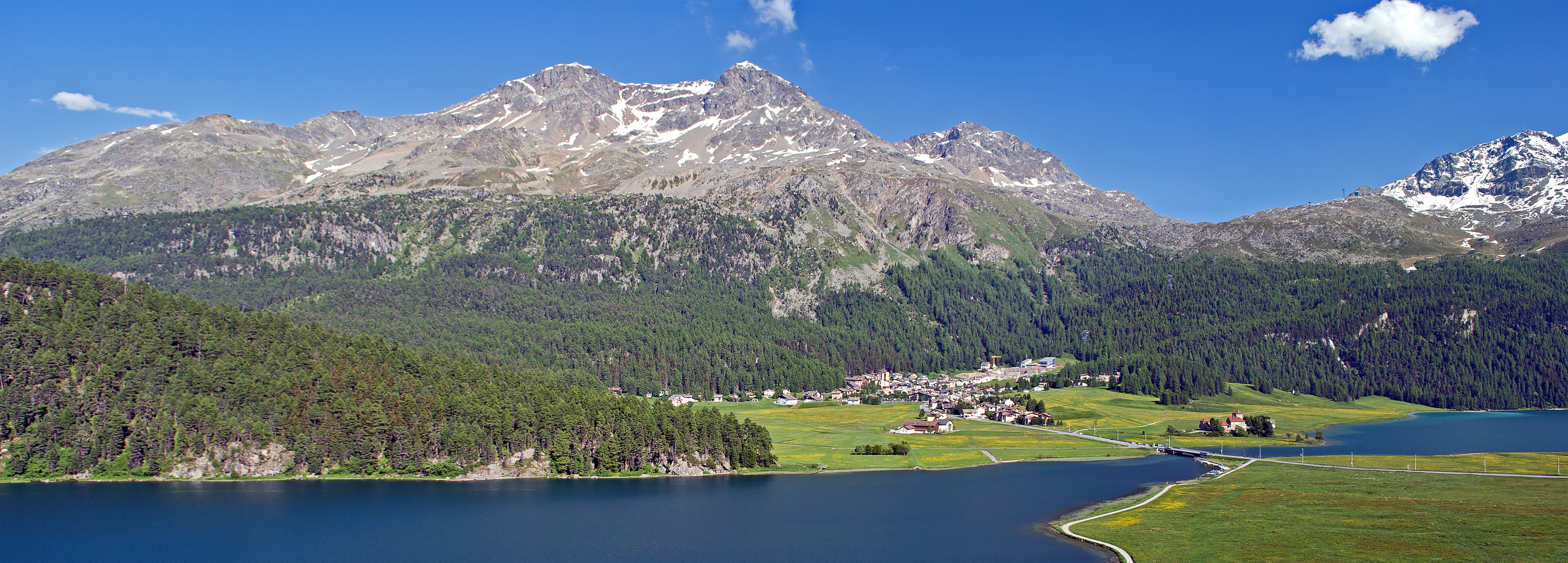
- Piz Surlej (centre) from Silvaplana

Highest point
- Elevation: 3,188 m (10,459 ft)
- Prominence: 433 m (1,421 ft)
- Parent peak: Piz Bernina
- Listing: Alpine mountains above 3000 m
- Coordinates: 46°27′11″N 9°50′35″E

Geography
- Location within Switzerland
- Location: Graubünden, Switzerland
- Parent range: Bernina Range

Piz Surlej is a mountain in the Bernina Range of the Alps, overlooking Lake Silvaplana in the canton of Graubünden. It lies between the main Engadin valley and the Val Roseg, north of Piz Corvatsch.
