= Val Roseg =

Valley in Graubünden, Switzerland

Coordinates: 46.4378°N 9.8692°E

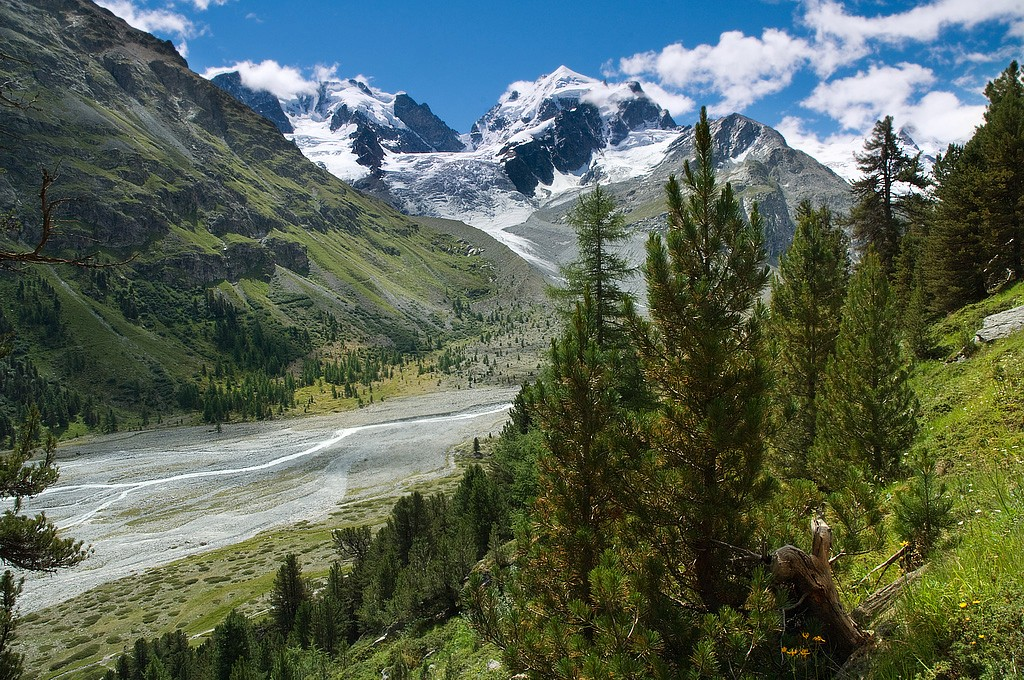
Val Roseg with Piz Roseg

The Val Roseg is a valley of the Swiss Alps, located on the north side of the Bernina Range in the canton of Graubünden (Engadin). The valley is drained by the Ova da Roseg, a tributary of the Flaz (Inn basin), at Pontresina. Most of the valley is part of an exclave of the municipality of Samedan. Only the bottom of Val Roseg lies in the municipality of Pontresina.

The main locality, outside Pontresina on the bottom of the valley, is Roseg (1,999 m) at the end of the main road. Two mountain huts owned by the Swiss Alpine Club are located in the valley near the glaciers: the Coaz Hut (2,610 m) and the Tschierva Hut (2,584 m).

The Val Roseg is surrounded by the highest mountains of Graubünden and Eastern Switzerland. The highest are Piz Bernina (4,049 m), Piz Scerscen (3,971 m) and Piz Roseg (3,937 m). The southern upper valley is heavily glaciated: the Roseg Glacier on the west side and the Tschierva Glacier on the east side. The lake Lej da Vadret, which formed at the bottom of the Roseg Glacier during the 20th century, is the largest of the valley.

The waterflows in Val Roseg's braided river system has been studied since the late 90s. Recent scientific studies focus mainly on the effects of climate change on the biodiversity in its small alpine streams.
