= Piz Morteratsch =

Mountain in Switzerland

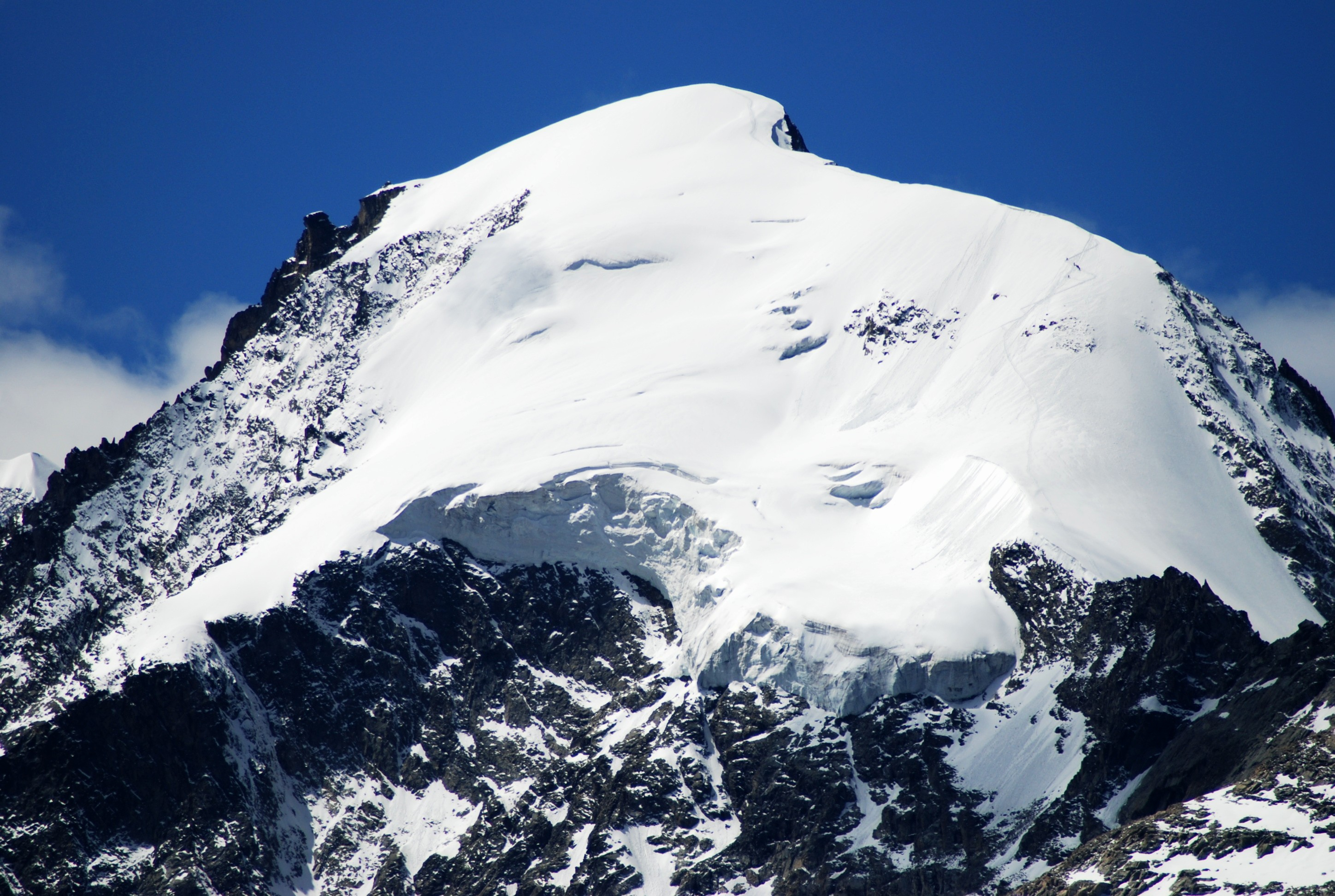
- Piz Morteratsch from the south

Highest point
- Elevation: 3,751 m (12,306 ft)
- Prominence: 324 m (1,063 ft)
- Parent peak: Piz Bernina
- Listing: Mountains of Switzerland; Alpine mountains above 3000 m
- Coordinates: 46°24′10″N 9°54′07″E

Geography
- Location within Switzerland
- Location: Switzerland
- Parent range: Bernina Range

Climbing
- First ascent: 11 September 1858 by C. Brügger and P. Gensler with guides Karl Emmermann and Angelo Klaingutti
- Easiest route: North flank and ridge (F)

Piz Morteratsch (3,751 m) is a mountain in the Bernina Range in Switzerland. It is bordered on the east by the Morteratsch Glacier and on the south-west by the Tschierva Glacier.

One of the easier of the higher mountains in the range to climb, the normal route follows that taken by the first ascentionists C. Brügger and P. Gensler with guides Karl Emmermann and Angelo Klaingutti on 11 September 1858. Three of its ridges present greater difficulties and are highly regarded:

- South-south-east ridge (D/D+), first ascent P. J. H. Unna with guides, 1903
- East-north-east ridge (AD), first ascent of complete ridge, Paul Schucan and A. Pfister, 10 October 1908 (the upper section had been climbed by Max Schintz with guides Alois Pollinger and his son Josef Pollinger of St. Niklaus in the canton Valais in August 1892)
- South-west ridge, (AD), first ascent by T. H. Philpott and Mrs Philpott with guides Peter Jenny and Alexander Fleury in September 1868

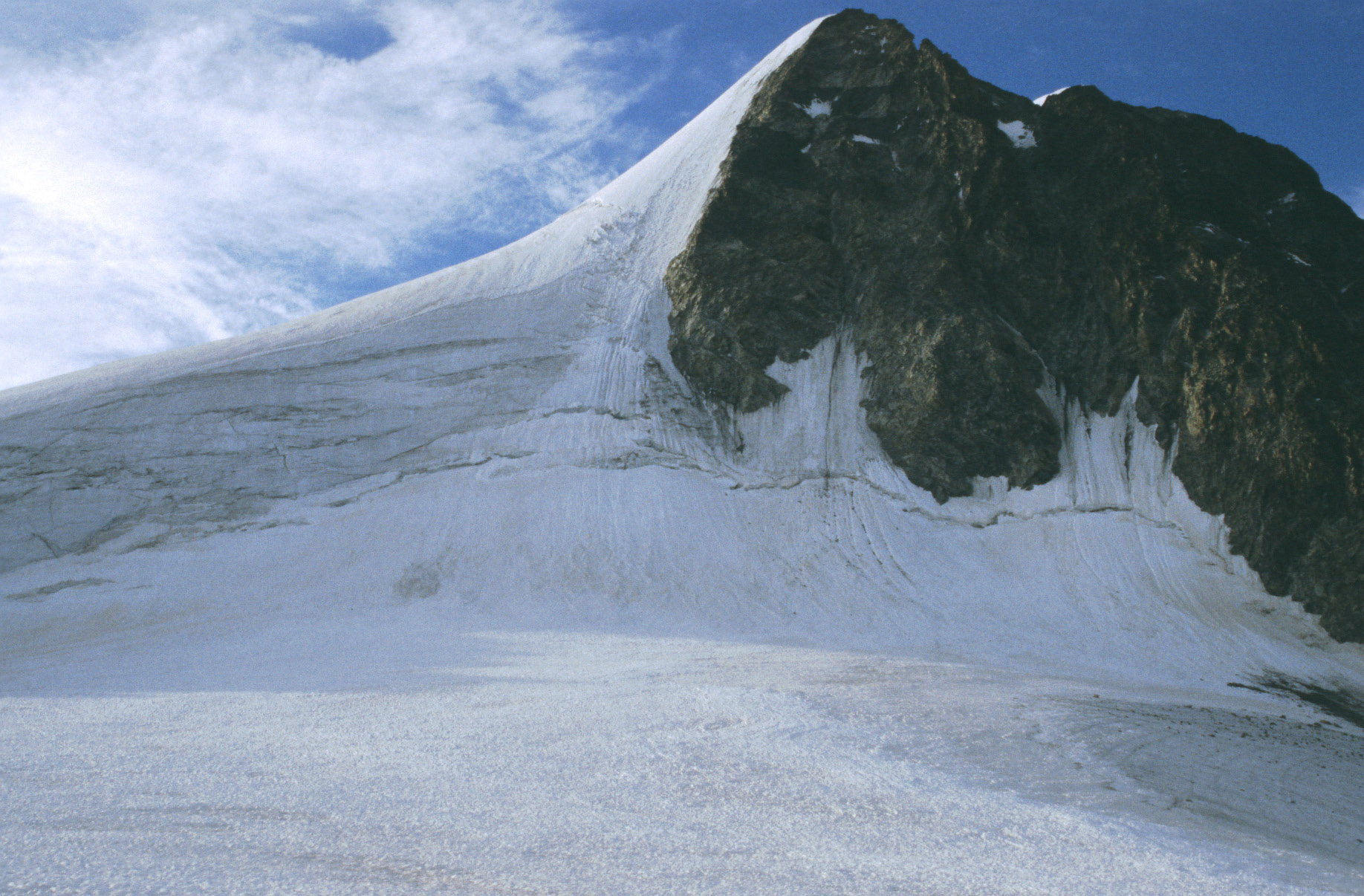
Piz Morteratsch from the north. The normal route from both Tschierva and Boval huts goes up the left skyline.

The mountain is served by the Boval hut (2,495 m, open 15 March–15 May and 15 June–15 October) and the Tschierva Hut (2,573 m, open end of March–15 May and 15 June–15 October).
