= Roseg Glacier =

Glacier in Switzerland

- Vadret da Roseg
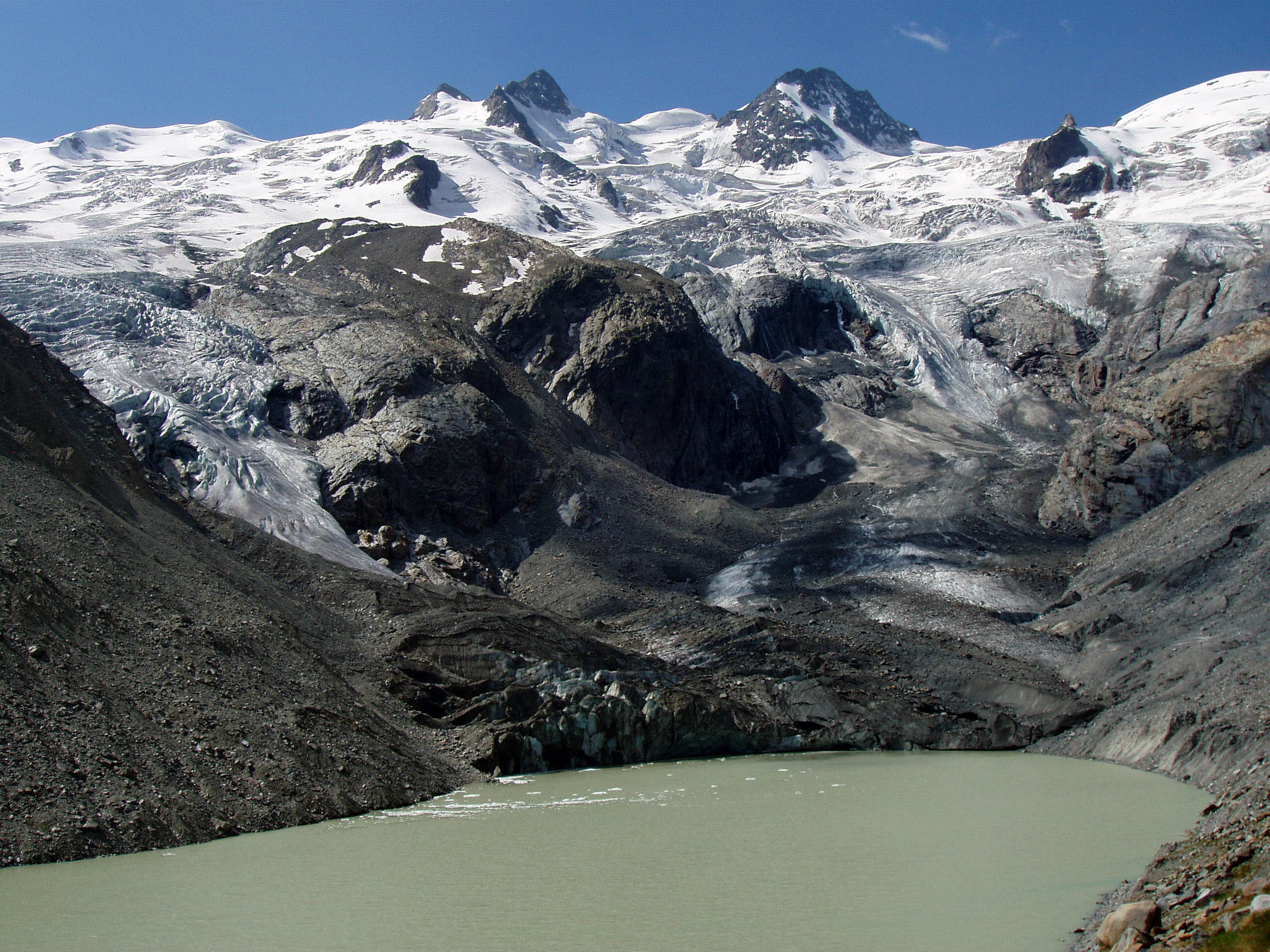
- Interactive map of Roseg Glacier
- Location: Graubünden, Switzerland
- Coordinates: 46°23′19″N 9°50′44″E
- Length: 4 km

Ramsar Wetland
- Official name: Vadret da Roseg
- Designated: 2 February 2005
- Reference no.: 1446

The Roseg Glacier (Romansh: Vadret da Roseg) is a 4 km long glacier (2005) situated in the Bernina Range, in the Val Roseg (Graubünden). In 1973 it had an area of 8.52 km^{2}.

== See also ==
- List of glaciers in Switzerland
- List of glaciers
- Retreat of glaciers since 1850
- Swiss Alps
