= Tschierva Glacier =

Glacier in Switzerland

- Vadret da Tschierva
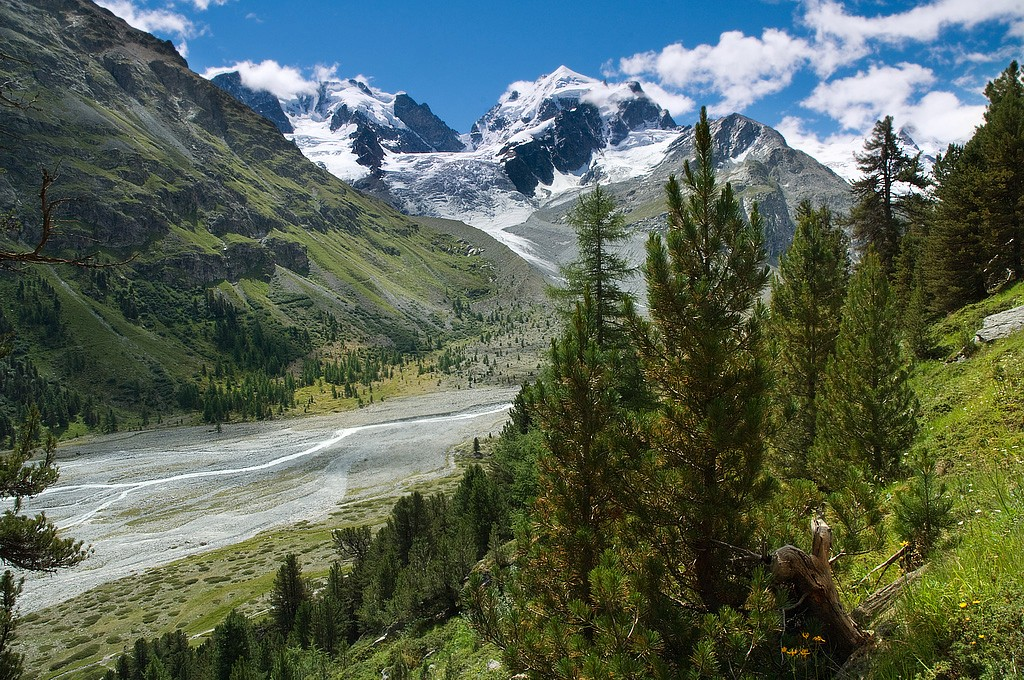
- Vadret da Tschierva
- Interactive map of Tschierva Glacier
- Location: Graubünden, Switzerland
- Coordinates: 46°24′11″N 9°52′16″E
- Length: 4 km (2.5 mi)
- Status: Retreating

The Tschierva Glacier (Romansh: Vadret da Tschierva) is a 4 km (2.5 mi) long glacier (2005) situated in the Bernina Range in the canton of Graubünden/Grisons in Switzerland. In 1973 it had an area of 6.2 km^{2} (2.4 sq mi).

== See also ==
- List of glaciers in Switzerland
- Swiss Alps
