= Piz Fora =

Mountain in Switzerland

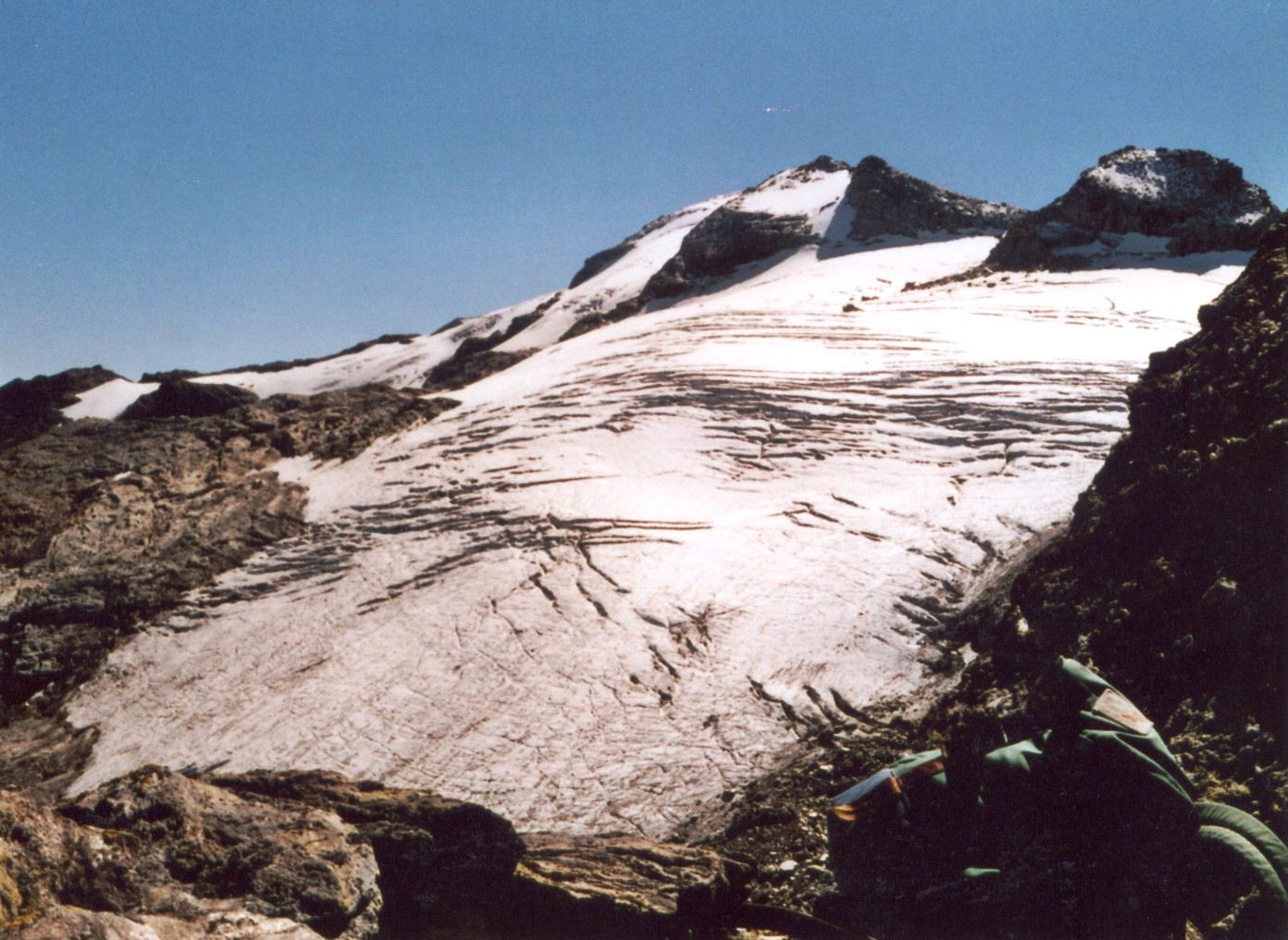
- Piz Fora (right) above the Fex Glacier.

Highest point
- Elevation: 3,363 m (11,033 ft)
- Prominence: 432 m (1,417 ft)
- Parent peak: Piz Bernina
- Listing: Alpine mountains above 3000 m
- Coordinates: 46°20′27″N 9°47′05″E

Geography
- Location within Alps
- Location: Graubünden, Switzerland / Lombardy, Italy
- Parent range: Bernina Range

Piz Fora is a mountain in the Bernina Range (Alps), on the border of Italy and Switzerland. The mountain has an elevation of 3,363 metres (11,033 ft) and is the tripoint between the valleys of Val Fedoz, Val Fex (both in Graubünden) and Val Malenco (in Lombardy).
