= Piz Roseg =

Mountain in Switzerland

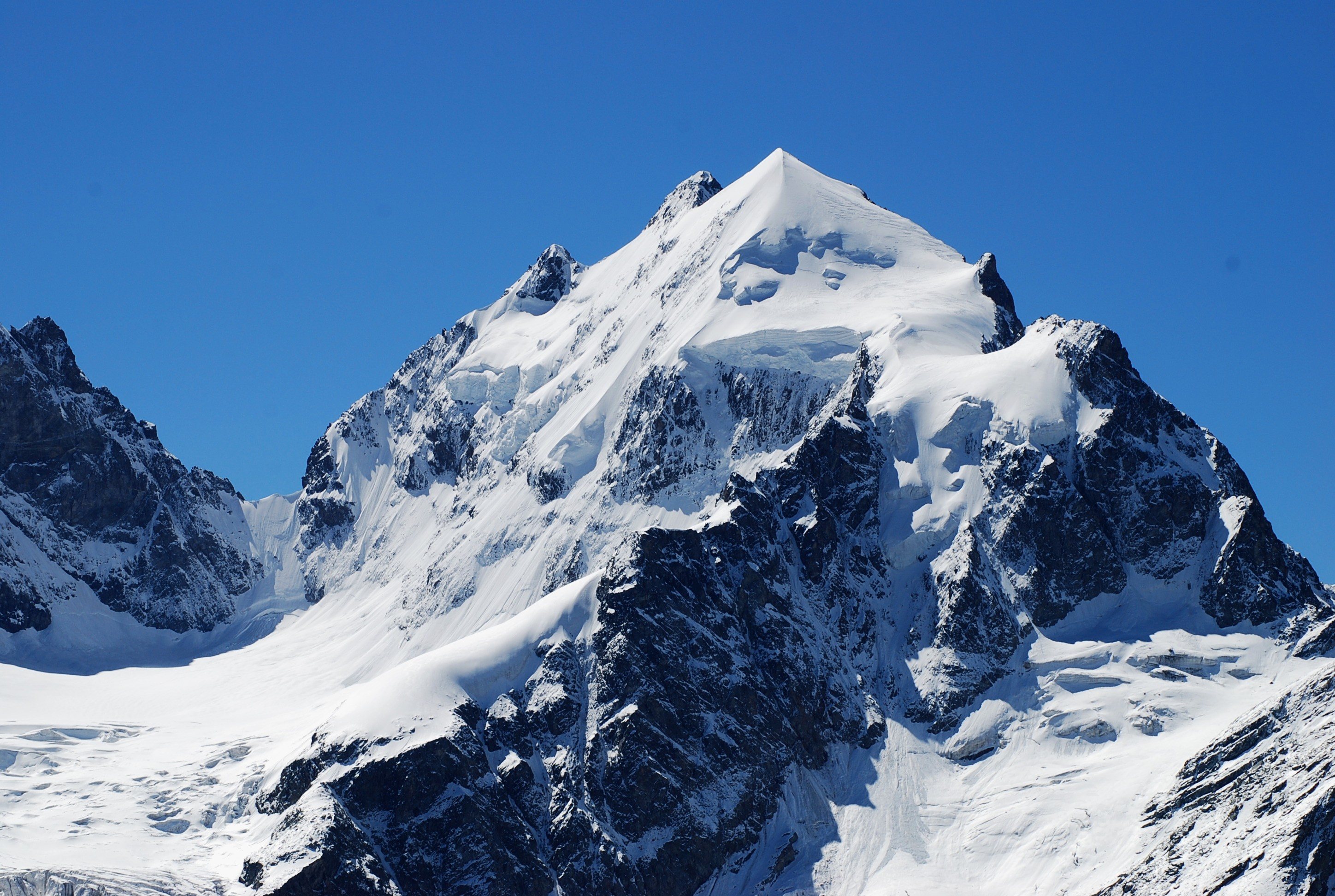
- The Güssfeldtsattel, the Roseg Pitschen, the main summit and the Schneekuppe (left to right)

Highest point
- Elevation: 3,935 m (12,910 ft)
- Prominence: 417 m (1,368 ft)
- Parent peak: Piz Bernina
- Listing: Alpine mountains above 3000 m
- Coordinates: 46°22′25.5″N 9°52′59.1″E

Geography
- Location within Switzerland
- Location: Graubünden, Switzerland (massif partially in Italy)
- Parent range: Bernina Range

Climbing
- First ascent: 28 June 1865 by A. W. Moore, Horace Walker and Jakob Anderegg
- Easiest route: NW ridge, from Coaz Hut (AD)

Piz Roseg (pronounced as peetse rawzech) is a mountain of the Bernina Range, overlooking the Val Roseg in the Swiss canton of Graubünden.

There are two summits on its main ridge:

- the south-east and higher summit (3,935 m)
- the north-west summit, known as the Schneekuppe (3,917 m).

There is also a prominent top on the east-north-east ridge, called the Roseg Pitschen (3,867 m) (Italian border).

== History ==
The first ascent of the mountain to the Schneekuppe was by F. T. Bircham with guides Peter Jenny and Alexander Fleury on 31 August 1863. The highest point of the mountain was reached two years later by A. W. Moore and Horace Walker with guide Jakob Anderegg on 28 June 1865. The first guideless ascent was made on 7 August 1882 by Charles Pilkington, his brother Lawrence and Eustace Hulton.

Piz Roseg is separated from the neighbouring Piz Scerscen by the Porta da Roseg (3,518 m), also called the Güssfeldtsattel. The Swiss side of this col – a steep ice slope of up to 70° – was first climbed by Paul Güssfeldt, with guides Hans Grass, Peter Jenny and Caspar Capat on 13 September 1872. Grass and Capat had spent the previous day cutting steps up the first two-fifths of the route. The following day they added at least another 450 steps on the first ascent.

The 700-metre north-east face of Piz Roseg was first climbed by Christian Klucker and Ludwig Norman-Neruda on 16 July 1890; the face – with a notable serac band halfway up – sports a number of difficult routes. Klucker, together with M. Barberia, also made the first traverse from the Italian side of the Porta da Roseg on 21 June 1898.

== See also ==
- List of mountains of the Alps above 3000 m
- List of mountains of Switzerland

== Photo gallery ==
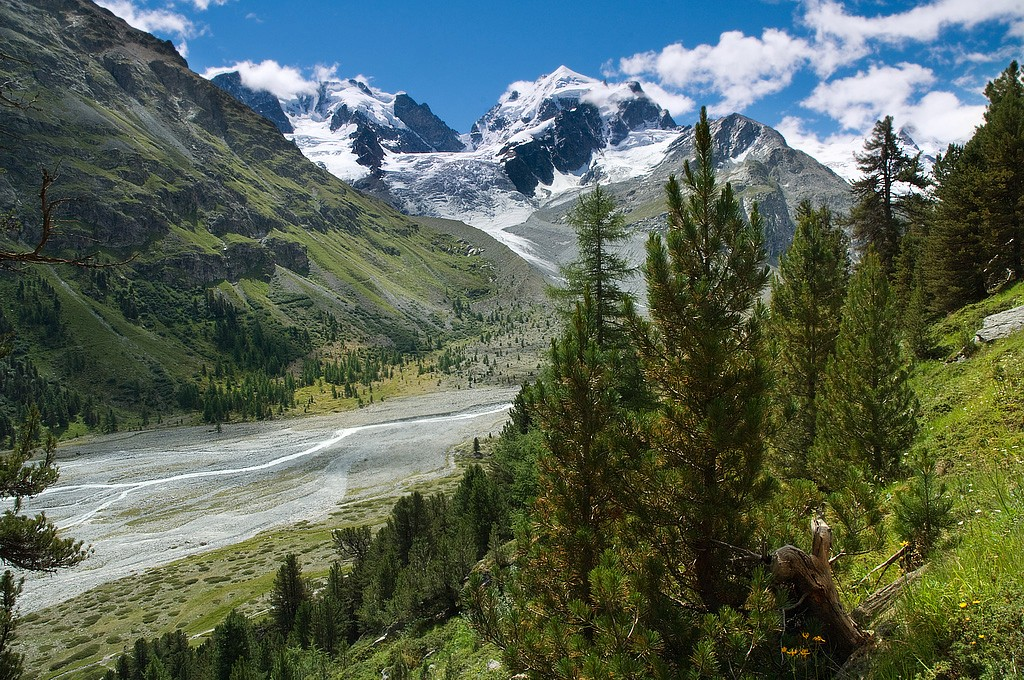
Piz Roseg above the Val Roseg

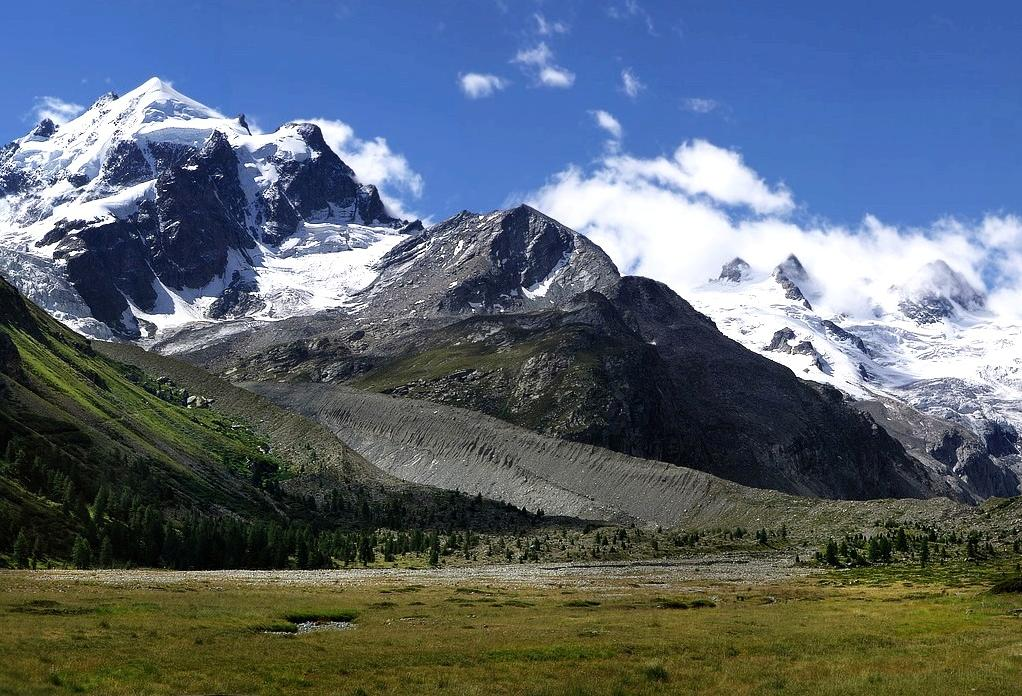
Piz Roseg above the Val Roseg
