= Lake St. Moritz =

Lake in the Grisons, Switzerland

- St. Moritzersee (German); Lej da San Murezzan (Romansh)
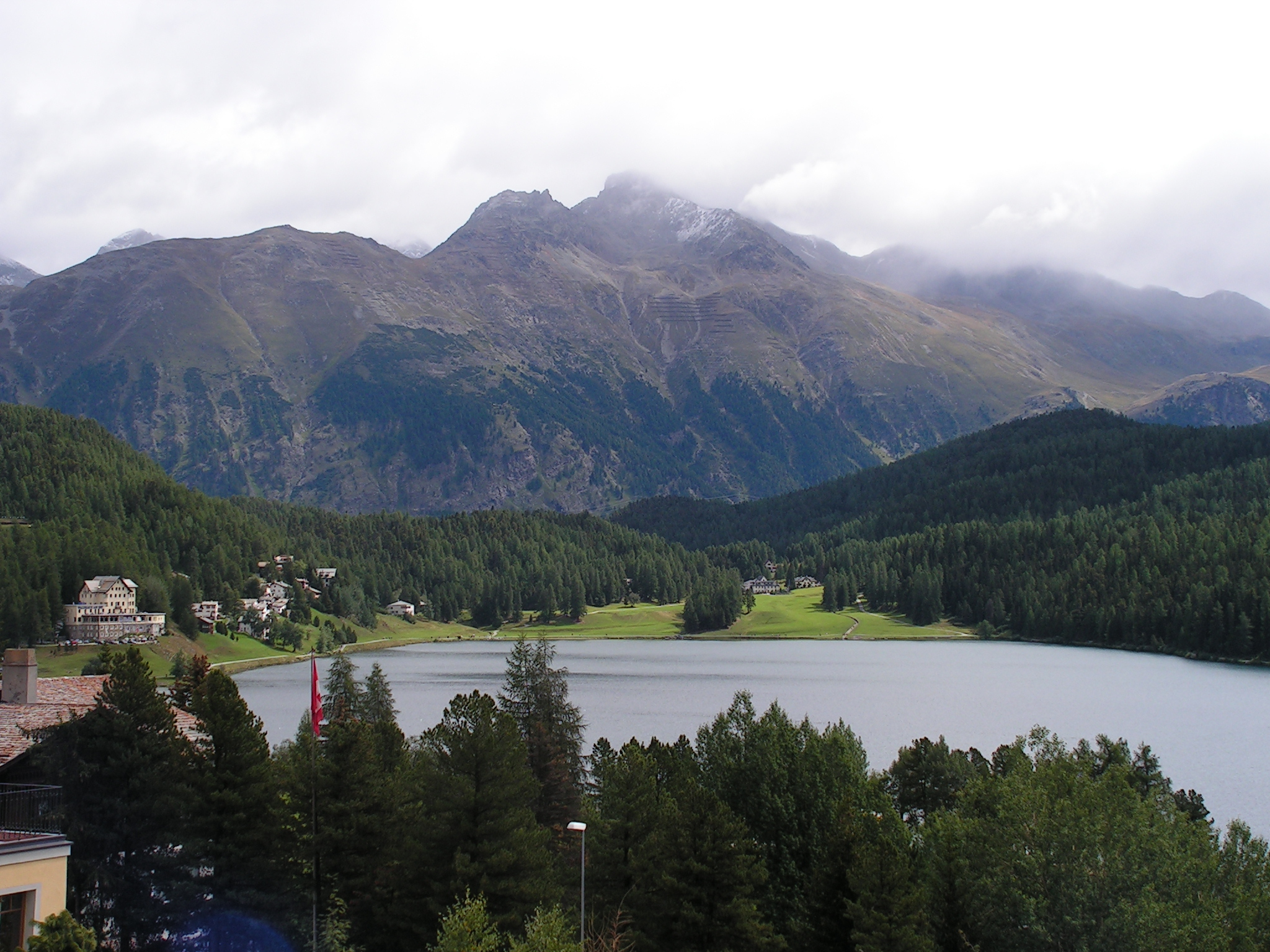
- Lake St. Moritz and surrounding mountains from St. Moritz-dorf

- Location within Canton of Graubünden Location within Switzerland Location within Alps
- Interactive map of Lake St. Moritz
- Location: Engadin, Grisons
- Coordinates: 46°29′40″N 9°50′45″E
- Type: meromictic
- Primary inflows: Inn, Ovel dal Mulin
- Primary outflows: Inn
- Basin countries: Switzerland
- Max. length: 1.6 km (0.99 mi)
- Max. width: 0.6 km (0.37 mi)
- Surface area: 0.78 km^{2} (0.30 sq mi)
- Max. depth: 44 m (144 ft)
- Water volume: 20 million cubic metres (16,000 acre⋅ft)
- Surface elevation: 1,768 m (5,801 ft)
- Frozen: December - May
- Settlements: St. Moritz

Lake St. Moritz (German: St. Moritzersee; Romansh: Lej da San Murezzan) is a lake at St. Moritz, Switzerland. With a surface of 0.78 km^{2}, it is smaller than the main lakes of the Upper Engadin valley (Lake Sils, Lake Silvaplana).

Every January or early February, Polo matches are held on the lake. Compared to polo played in the summer, a slightly larger and lighter red ball is used that is easily visible in the snow.

For three weekends every February, horse races are held on the frozen lake. These races called "White Turf" have been held since 1907 and brings the wealthy tourists to the lake for champagne and betting. This is also the location, where sports enthusiasts invented the sport of skijoring. In this type of race, thoroughbred horses compete without riders on their backs, but instead skiers in tow. While the sport is also played in other alpine countries, it still is mainly found in the region in which it as originated. The sport has evolved since the first race in 1906; the race as held on the road from St. Moritz to Champfer and as won by the President of Alpina Ski Club Philip Mark and his horse Blitz (German for lightning). Today, the race is run similar to other horse races, with all horses starting at the same time and running around the track. Steering is very difficult complicating the race significantly requiring great strength and skill on behalf of the athletes. The skier with the most points after the three races on consecutive Sundays is crowned the "King of the Engadin Valley". In addition to skijoring, traditional flat and trotting races over different distances are held. Until recently visitor parking was also located on the lake, but this practice has since been prohibited.

The first cricket tournament on the frozen lake took place in 1988. English cricketer David Gower parked his rental car on the ice in January 1990; overnight it broke through the ice and sank.

== Gallery ==
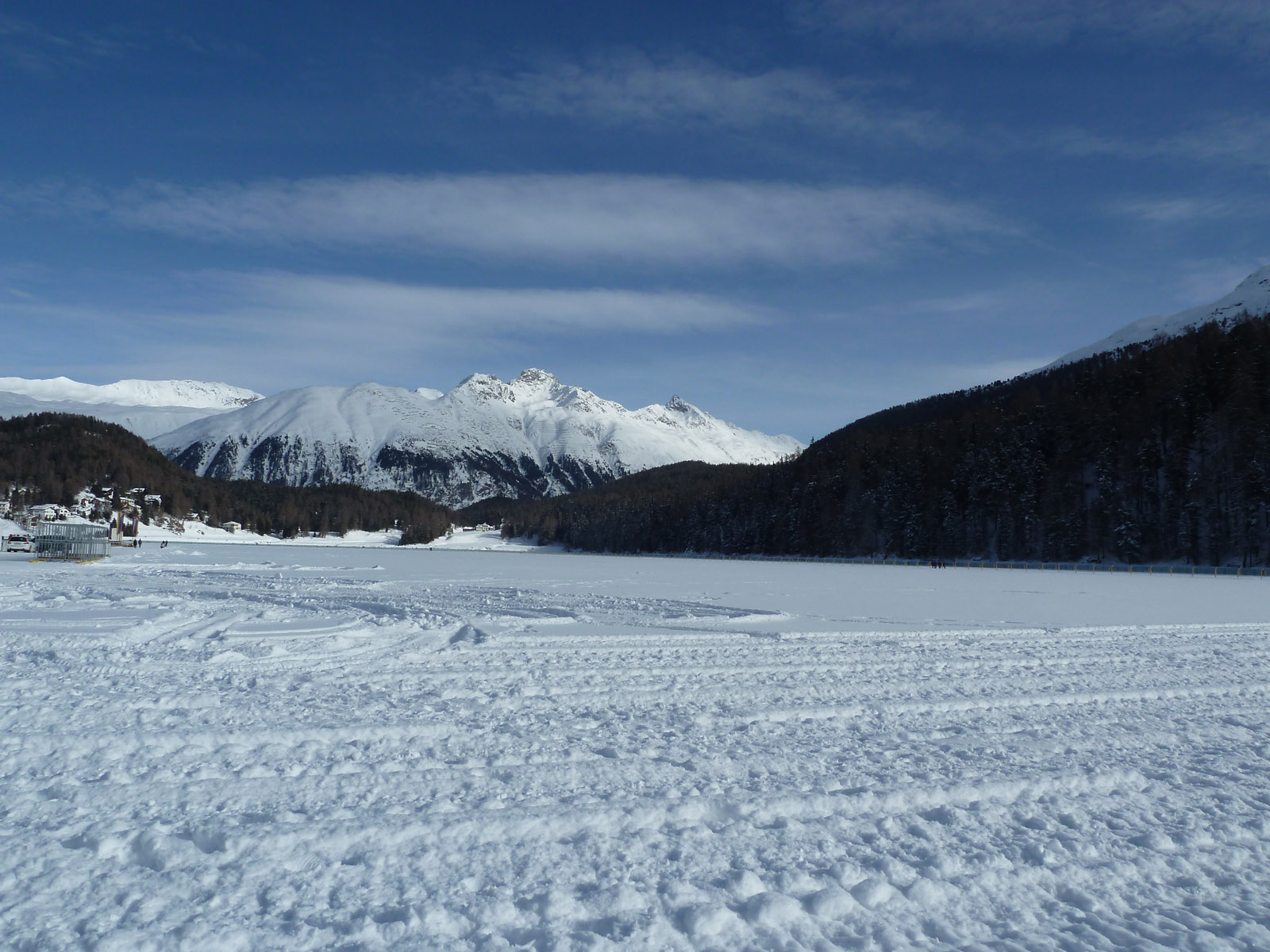
A view of Lake St. Moritz in winter 2013, Switzerland

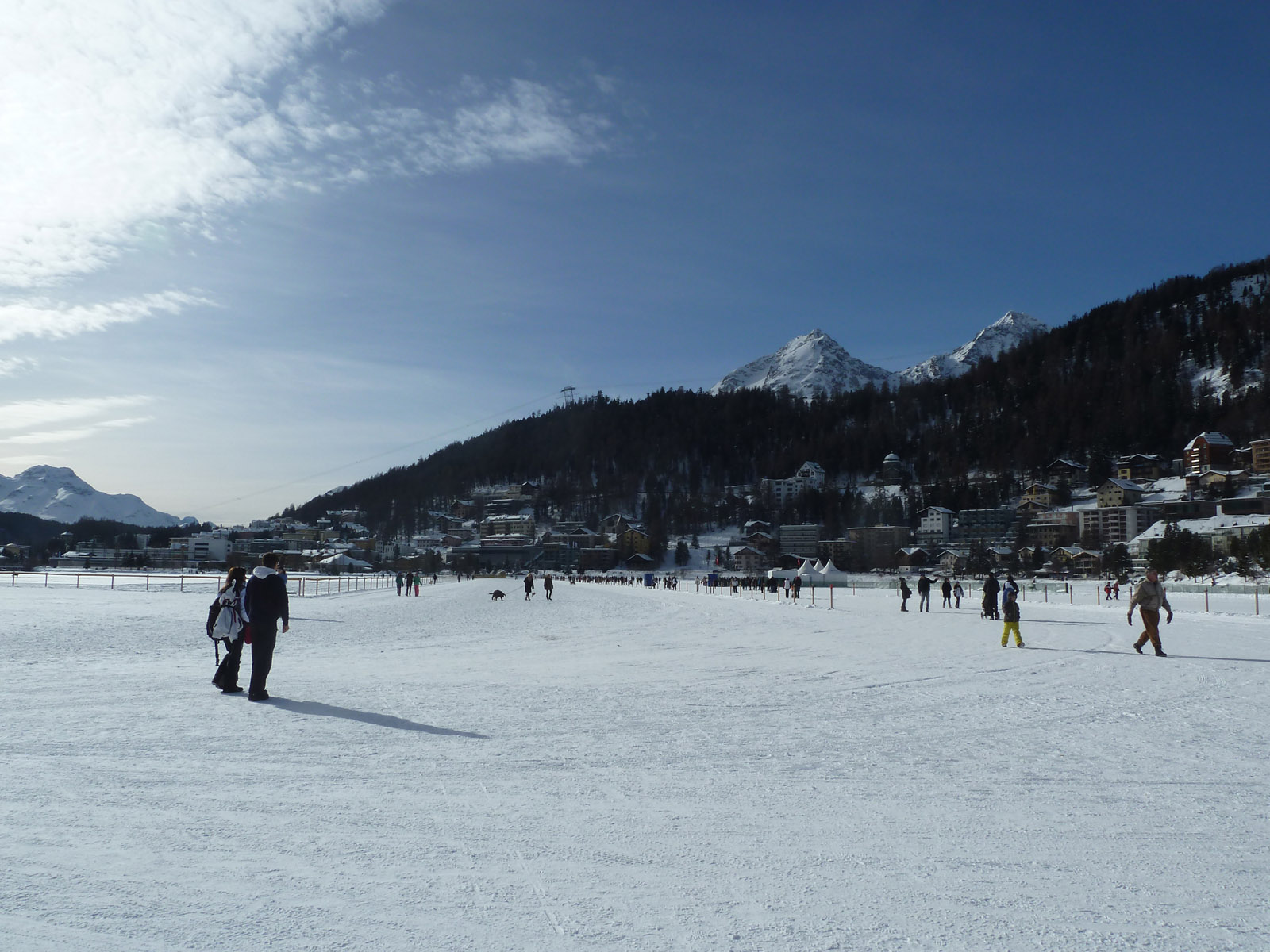
Frozen Lake St. Moritz and St. Moritz town in winter

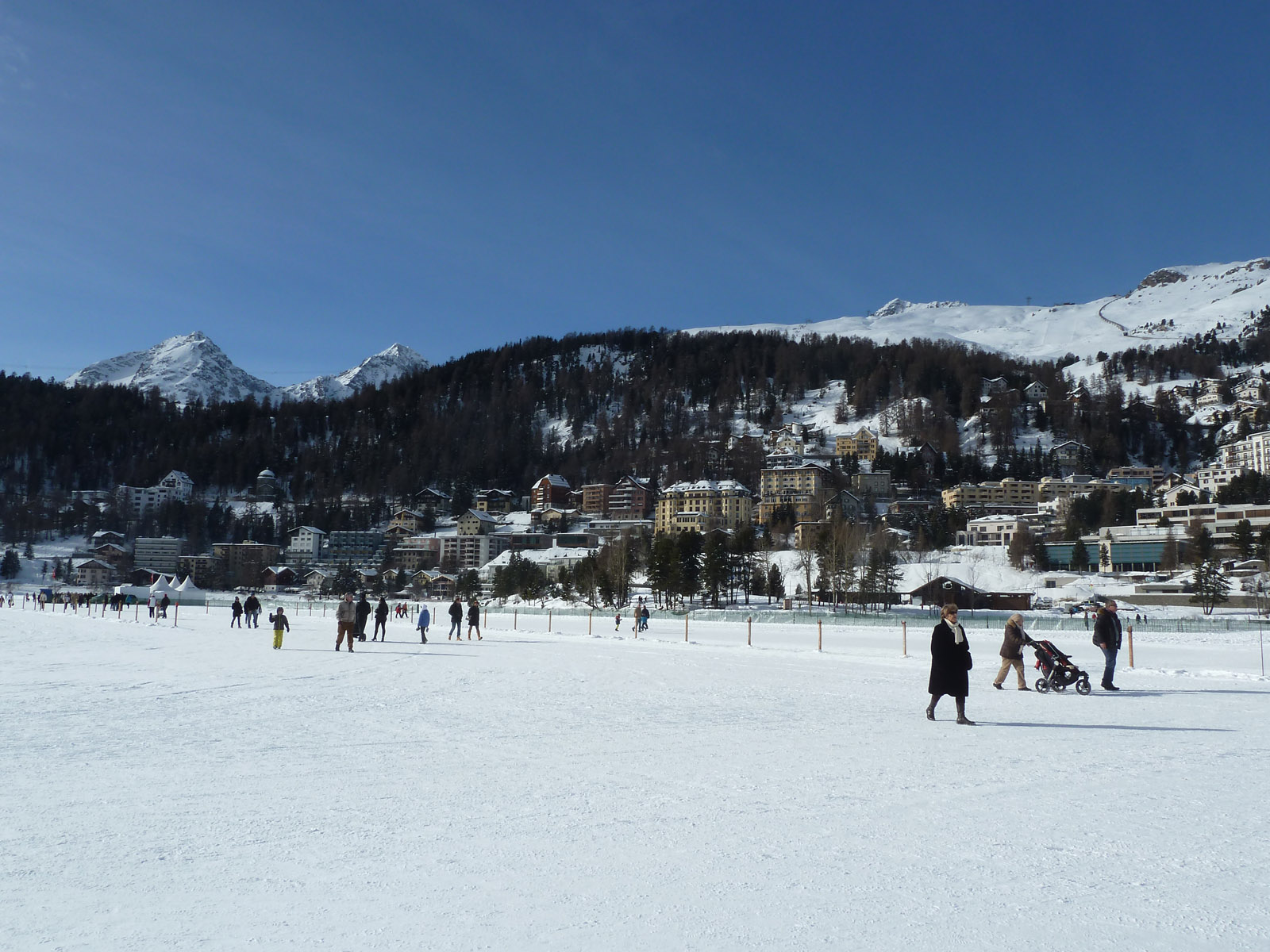
A view of St. Moritz from frozen Lake St. Moritz

== See also ==
- Engadine Line
- List of lakes of Switzerland
- List of mountain lakes of Switzerland
