= Piz Corvatsch =

Mountain in the Bernina Range in Switzerland

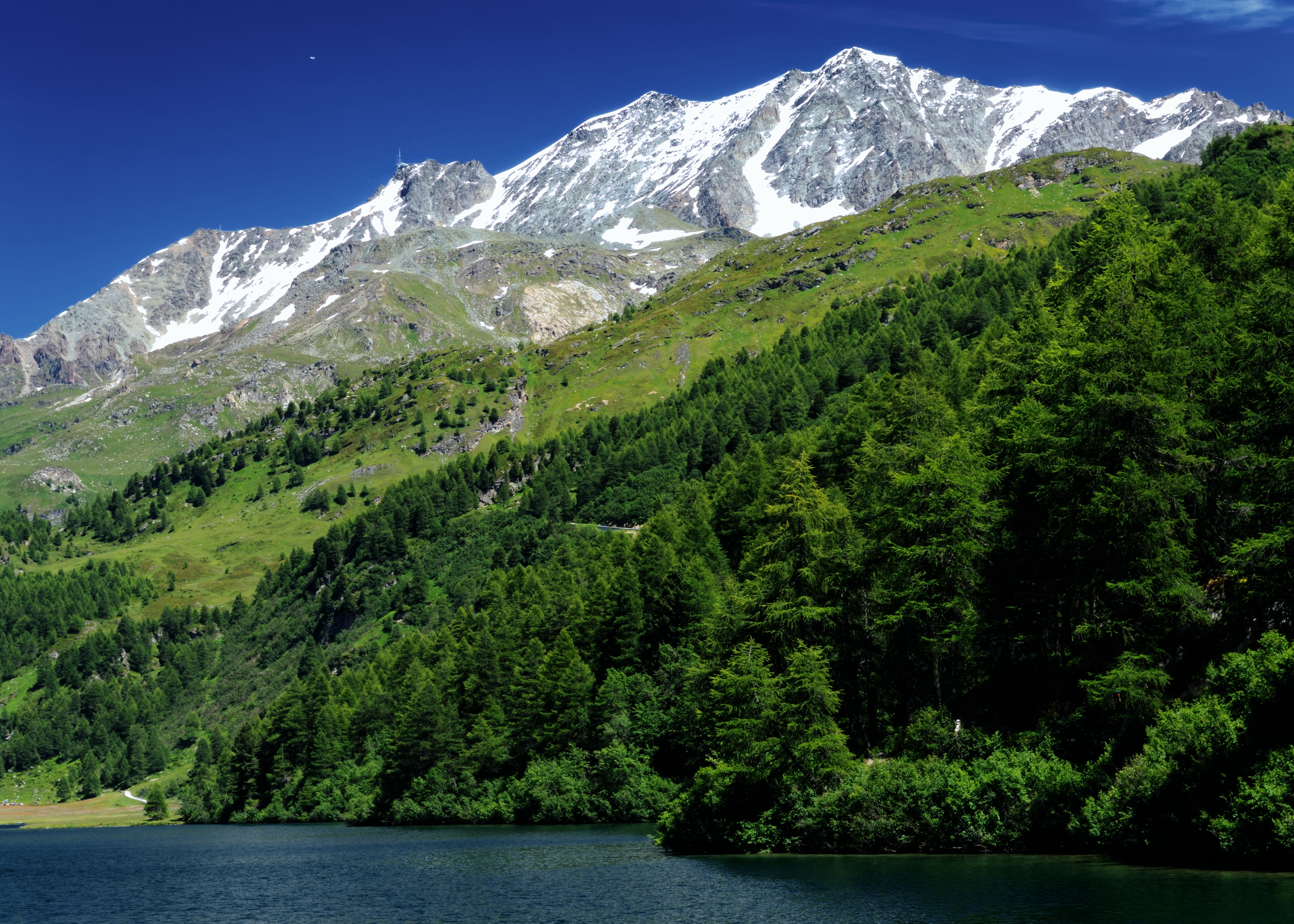
- Piz Corvatsch seen from Lake Sils

Highest point
- Elevation: 3,451 m (11,322 ft)
- Prominence: 383 m (1,257 ft)
- Parent peak: Piz Bernina
- Isolation: 5.2 km (3.2 mi)
- Listing: Alpine mountains above 3000 m
- Coordinates: 46°24′30″N 9°48′58″E

Naming
- English translation: Crow (or raven) peak

Geography
- Location within Switzerland
- Location: Grison, Switzerland
- Parent range: Bernina Range

Climbing
- First ascent: 1850 by Johann Coaz and party
- Easiest route: From the Corvatsch station

Piz Corvatsch ([ˌpitskorˈvatʃ]) is a mountain in the Bernina Range of the Alps, overlooking Lake Sils and Lake Silvaplana in the Engadin region of the canton of Grisons. With an elevation of 3,451 m (11,322 ft), it is the highest point on the range separating the main Inn valley from the Val Roseg. Aside from Piz Corvatsch, two other slightly lower summits make up the Corvatsch massif: Piz Murtèl (3,433 m (11,263 ft); north of Piz Corvatsch) and the unnamed summit where lies the Corvatsch upper cable car station (3,303 m (10,837 ft); north of Piz Murtèl). Politically, the summit of Piz Corvatsch is shared between the municipalities of Sils im Engadin/Segl and Samedan, although the 3,303 m high summit lies between the municipalities of Silvaplana and Samedan. The tripoint between the aforementioned municipalities is the summit of Piz Murtèl.

Several glaciers lie on the east side on the massif. The largest, below Piz Corvatsch, is named Vadret dal Murtèl. The second largest, below Piz Murtèl and the station, is named Vadret dal Corvatsch.

The Corvatsch cable car starts above the village of Surlej, east of Silvaplana and culminates at 3,298 m. From there, the summit of Piz Corvatsch can be reached by traversing Piz Murtèl. In winter and spring, the mountain is part of a ski area, which is amongst the highest in Switzerland and the Eastern Alps.

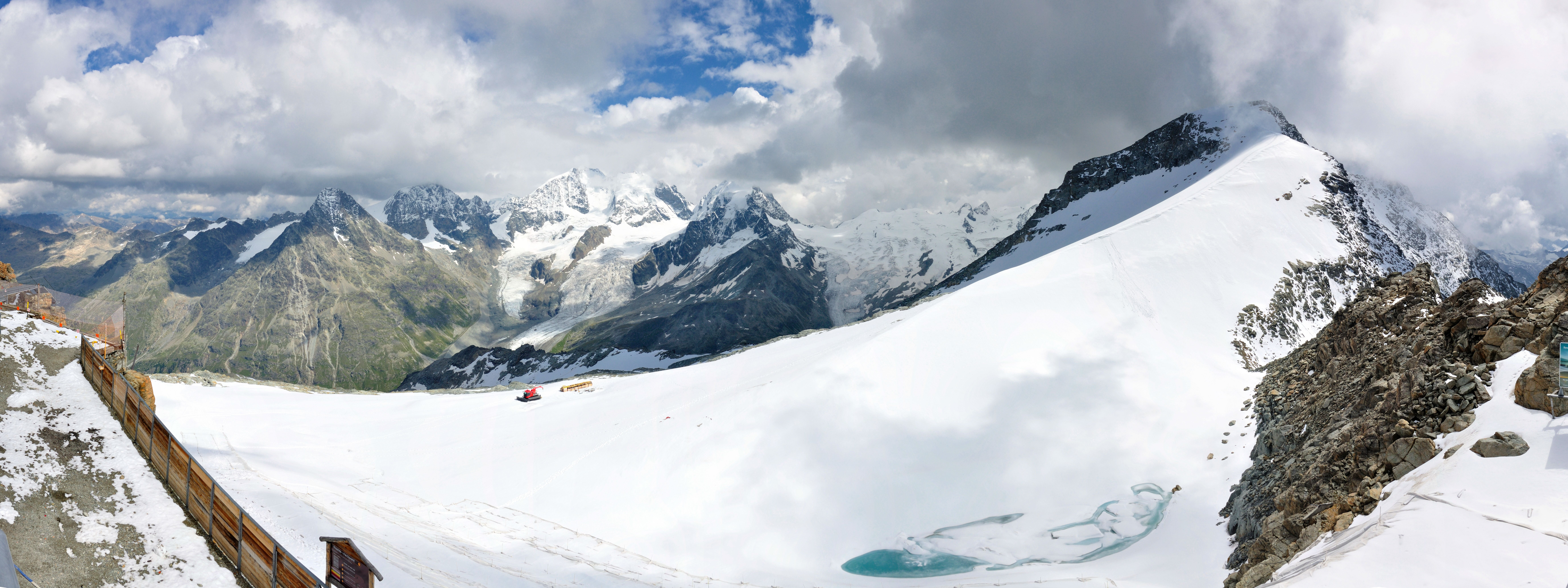
View from the observation deck of the Corvatsch station. On the right is Piz Murtèl and on the middle-left is Piz Bernina, the highest mountain in the Eastern Alps. The summit of Piz Corvatsch lies behind Piz Murtèl.

== Climate ==
Piz Corvatsch has an alpine tundra climate (ET) with long, cold winters lasting most of the year and a brief period during summer where the average daily highs rise above freezing.

Climate data for Piz Corvatsch, elevation 3,294 m (10,807 ft), (1991–2020)
Month	Jan	Feb	Mar	Apr	May	Jun	Jul	Aug	Sep	Oct	Nov	Dec	Year
Mean daily maximum °C (°F)	−8.5 (16.7)	−9.2 (15.4)	−7.7 (18.1)	−5.3 (22.5)	−1.3 (29.7)	2.6 (36.7)	5.3 (41.5)	5.4 (41.7)	1.6 (34.9)	−1.1 (30.0)	−5.3 (22.5)	−7.7 (18.1)	−2.6 (27.3)
Daily mean °C (°F)	−11.0 (12.2)	−11.8 (10.8)	−10.1 (13.8)	−7.6 (18.3)	−3.5 (25.7)	0.4 (32.7)	2.6 (36.7)	2.9 (37.2)	−0.6 (30.9)	−3.2 (26.2)	−7.5 (18.5)	−10.2 (13.6)	−5.0 (23.1)
Mean daily minimum °C (°F)	−13.5 (7.7)	−14.4 (6.1)	−12.6 (9.3)	−10.0 (14.0)	−5.7 (21.7)	−1.9 (28.6)	0.2 (32.4)	0.6 (33.1)	−2.7 (27.1)	−5.4 (22.3)	−9.8 (14.4)	−12.7 (9.1)	−7.3 (18.8)
Average precipitation mm (inches)	77.5 (3.05)	68.6 (2.70)	75.7 (2.98)	106.3 (4.19)	131.8 (5.19)	144.1 (5.67)	134.7 (5.30)	134.6 (5.30)	99.8 (3.93)	120.8 (4.76)	135.3 (5.33)	87.9 (3.46)	1,317.1 (51.85)
Average precipitation days (≥ 1 mm)	9.0	8.3	10.0	11.6	14.1	14.1	13.1	13.0	10.1	10.3	11.2	9.9	134.7
Average relative humidity (%)	62	64	71	77	80	80	77	77	75	68	68	66	72
Mean monthly sunshine hours	140.7	149.6	185.8	173.5	172.8	179.3	200.0	185.4	166.7	165.1	124.7	117.2	1,960.8
Percentage possible sunshine	56	56	53	45	39	40	44	45	47	53	50	49	47
Source 1: NOAA
Source 2: MeteoSwiss (humidity 1981-2010)

== See also ==
- List of mountains of Switzerland accessible by public transport
- List of buildings and structures in Switzerland above 3000 m
