= Engadine Line =

Strike-slip Fault in Switzerland, Italy and Austria

The Engadine Line is an over 50-kilometre (30 mi) long strike-slip fault in the Swiss canton of Graubünden, which extends into Italy and Austria. It runs along the Engadine Valley (which formed on the fault) and the Bregaglia Valley and offsets Austroalpine and Penninic units in a sinistral direction. The western end of the fault appears to peter out into ductile deformation in the Bregaglia Valley or continues as the Gruf Line to the southwest; the eastern end is buried by the Ötztal tectonic block and may continue as the "Inntal fault", "Isar fault" or "Loisach fault".

Total offset along the Engadine Line is about 4–20 kilometres (2–12 mi), decreasing southwest. It began in the Oligocene, but there is evidence of recent neotectonic activity, which resulted in the collapse of the Maloja Pass area at the beginning of the Holocene. Seismic activity occurs along the Engadine Line, and springs and carbon dioxide exhalations in the Engadine are linked to the fault.

== Geology ==
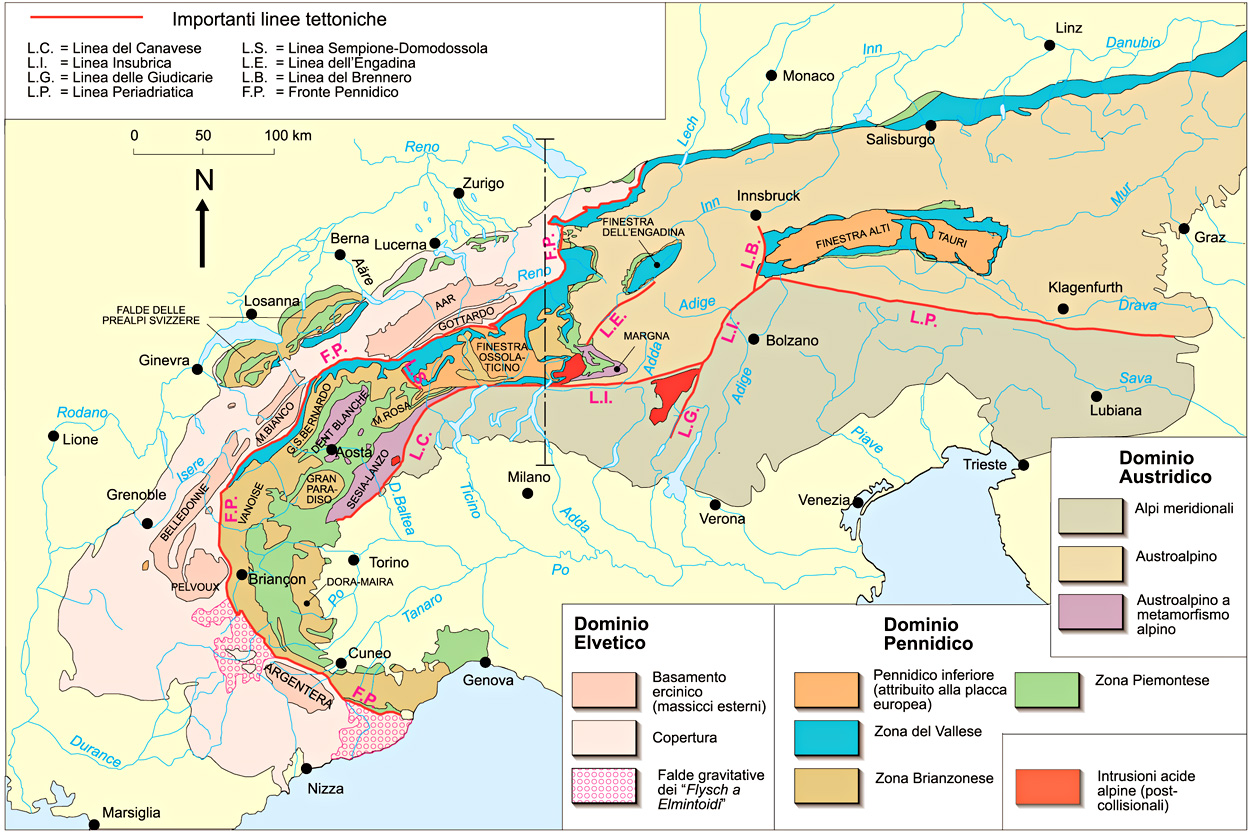
Tectonic map of the Alps, the Engadine Line is marked with "L.E."

The Engadine Line is an over 50 kilometres (30 mi) long northeast-trending fault in southeastern Switzerland. It was originally discovered in 1896 and named "Engadiner Spalte". It is a steeply dipping left-lateral strike-slip fault that cuts to a depth of 10 kilometres (6 mi). The total slip on the Engadine Line decreases from 20 kilometres (12 mi) in the Lower Engadine to 3–6 kilometres (2–4 mi) in the Upper Engadine and 1–2 kilometres (0.6–1.2 mi) at Sils, Maloja. The towns of Bever, Maloja, Nauders, S-chanf, Samedan, Sils, St. Moritz, Vicosoprano and Zernez are located along the Engadine Line, as is the Albigna Dam.

The fault trace is generally not recognizable on the surface, as it is buried beneath alluvium; the only outcrops are found at Maloja and at Stragliavita close to Zernez. Parts of the Engadine Line were already recognized by 1914, but it was only in 1977 that they were identified as belonging to a single fault zone, reportedly after a suggestion by a Chinese geologist. Sometimes the names "Nassereith-Silz fault" and "Scuols-Vils fault" are used for the Engadine Line, which was originally also known as Engadiner Spalte.

The Engadine Line deforms the Austroalpine and Penninic nappes and also appears in magnetic anomaly maps. It is responsible for the geologic differences between Graubünden north and south of the Engadine. The Engadine Line is sometimes considered to be a branch of the Periadriatic Fault System. The movement on the Engadine Line is part of a larger tectonic process in the Alps, whereby the mountain range is compressed in north–south direction and is thus squeezed upwards and eastwards. Of the numerous fault zones in the Eastern Alps, the Engadine Line and its northeastern extensions are the longest.

Evidence for a vertical component in fault motion and its interpretation is conflicting; the block southeast of the fault has a down-to-the-east component with normal slip in the northeastern sector of the Engadine Line that may be part of east–west extension in the Alps, while the sector in the Bregaglia Valley features an uplifting northwestern block with reverse slip that may be a recent change in fault motion. Vertical offset on the Engadine Line appears to have opposite direction east and west of Samedan–St. Moritz and has been interpreted as a rotational movement of tectonic blocks. The Churer uplift influenced the western side of the Engadine Line and generated eastward tilting.

=== Geomorphology ===
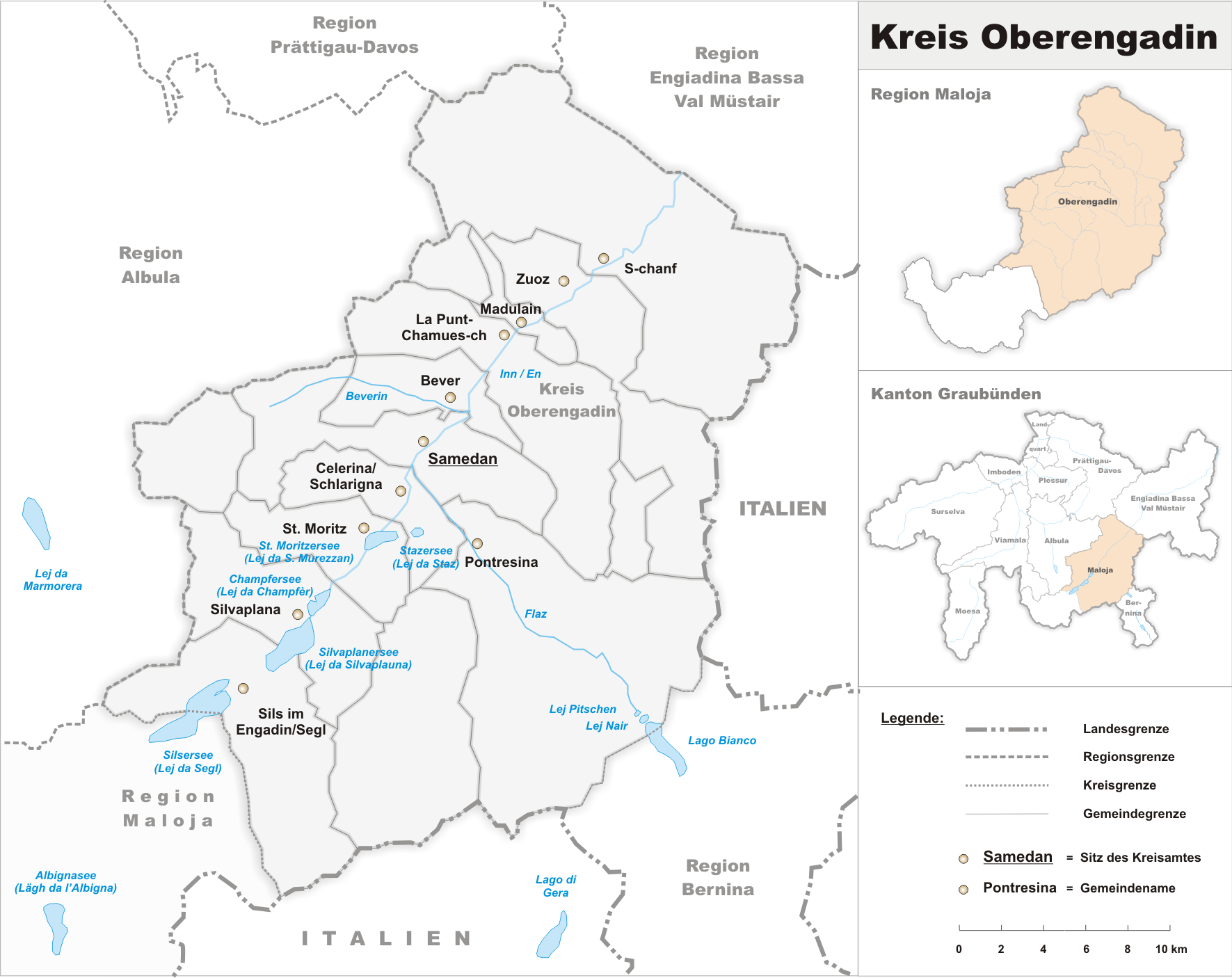
Map showing some toponyms associated with the Engadine Line

In the Lower Engadine, the Engadine Line delimits the Silvretta covers and the Engadine Window from the Ötztal Alps block, which appears to bury the Engadine Line in part. The movement along the Engadine Line may have generated the Engadine Window by exposing Penninic rock units. The Schlining Thrust, which separates the Austroalpine Ötztal unit in the east from the Sesvenna-Campo-Silvretta units in the west, joins the Engadine Line in Austria. On its eastern end the Engadine Line may reach into the Northern Calcareous Alps and can be traced as far as the town of Imst in Austria; it may reach as far as Innsbruck. The Inntal fault is probably the northeastern continuation of the Engadine Line and has a maximum offset of 48 kilometres (30 mi), reaching the Molasse basin. The Loisach and the Isar faults are other candidate prolongations of the Engadine Line; alternatively, the former has been interpreted as a parallel fault that splits up in the Wetterstein Mountains. Later movements in the Ötztal Alps area may have overprinted the trace of the Engadine Line there. It is conjugated with dextral strike-slip faults in the Northern Calcareous Alps.

The Inn River valley formed along the Engadine Line. There, the fault runs e.g. between the villages La Punt and St. Moritz. In the Samedan area, geologic research has found evidence of releasing bends and restraining bends associated with Miocene movement along the Engadine Line, as well as of normal faults linked to the Engadine Line. Offsets in road cuts at Seraplana have been associated with the fault. At Zernez the river departs the Engadine Line before returning at Scuol. The Engadine Line might form the northwestern border of the Scarl-Campo rock units. The combined effects of glacial erosion and slip along the Engadine Line generated the Lej da Segl, Lej da Silvaplauna, Lej da Champfèr and Lej da San Murezzan lakes which are traversed by the Inn River. The fault cuts across the Isola delta of Lake Sils.

In the Upper Engadine and the Maloja Pass area the Engadine Line is represented by 0.5–9 kilometres (0.3–5.6 mi) long northeast-trending and 0.3–2 kilometres (0.2–1.2 mi) long east–west trending fault segments which form scarps. Depressions located between the fault traces are occupied by lakes such as Silsersee, Silvaplanersee and St. Moritzsee, which do not appear to be moraine-dammed and may have been formed by the activity of the Engadine Line. Subaqueous ridges in Lake Sils are linked to the fault. Close to the Maloja Pass the Engadine Line forms a single fault. In the Forno Valley the fault crops out in the form of polished surfaces, scarps and striations along with fault gouge. The course of the Orlegna River is diverted by a shutter ridge at the intersection with the Engadine Line. There, the Engadine Line runs along the southern side of the Inn and Bregaglia Valleys and is accompanied by deep-seated mass failures; eventually it disappears under sediments close to Promontogno. As with the Inn Valley, the Bregaglia Valley is the surface expression of the Engadine Line.

The Engadine Line continues as the "Gruf Line", which runs along the southern side of the valley, accompanied by deep-seated mass failures which obscure the surface presentation of the Gruf Line, and crosses into Italian territory. The Gruf Line appears to be based in deeper, more ductile crustal domains than the Engadine Line, and it is possible that part of the offset is taken up by ductile stress along the Bregaglia Valley. Alternative interpretations see the Gruf Line as a mylonite zone, discuss a "Bergell Fault" that constitutes a southwestern expression of the Engadine Line and the root of the Bregaglia, identify another lineament between Maloja and Chiavenna, or prolong the Engadine Line to Chiavenna and even farther. The Gruf line separates the Gruf migmatites from the Chiavenna ophiolites and the Tambo nappe. It and the Gruf Line accommodate the exhumation of the Bergell pluton, which was tilted to the east between the Engadine Line and the Periadriatic Line.

A transition from brittle faulting on the Engadine Line to ductile deformation in the western Bregaglia Valley might explain why the Engadine Line does not appear to continue there. Slope instability that causes frequent landslides and deformation in rock formations of the Bregaglia Valley may related to activity of the Engadine Line. Structural lineaments related to the Engadine Line can be traced as far as the Valle San Giacomo west of the Bregaglia.

== Geologic history ==
Movement along the Engadine Line commenced during or before the late Oligocene but post-dates the cooling of the Bergell pluton 28 million years ago. Movement took place during the Oligocene before probably ceasing during the Miocene and has been attributed to the so-called "Turba phase" of extensional development of the Alps. The movement along the Engadine Line and Inntal faults influenced the course of the Inn River, allowed its watershed to expand southwestwards, and altered drainages during the Sarmatian. The weak rock along the fault was easily eroded by glaciers, and glacial erosion eventually formed the Engadine valley along the fault.

=== Neotectonics ===
There is very little information on the recent activity of the Engadine Line. Detecting faults in the Alps is difficult, as glacial and fluvial erosion as well as gravitational processes and landslides quickly erase evidence of tectonic processes. Earthquakes are often poorly documented in the thinly populated Alps; they tend to be weak and often cannot be linked to specific faults.

There are only few indications of recent activity, and it is not agreed upon that it was active during the Upper Pleistocene-Holocene, although evidence of Quaternary movement is widely found. The Engadine Line and other lineaments delimit a fast uplifting area of the Central Alps. In the Val Laschadura, close to Zernez, post-glacial faulting is recorded, and recent vertical offsets of more than 10 centimetres (3.9 in) are recorded from fluvial sands close to Piz Mundin. Trees that drowned between 650 and 700 AD in Lake Sils, and around 1000 AD as well as at the beginning of the 14th century in Lake Silvaplana may indicate lake level changes or ground subsidence triggered by tectonic activity on the Engadine Line. A large earthquake in the Alps during the 6th century left traces in the Engadine lakes, but the Engadine Line is unlikely to have been its source. Traces of multiple glaciations are preserved in the Forno Valley. Deposits left by the most recent glaciation are unaffected by tectonic activity at the Engadine Line, but the Orlegna River has not yet recovered from the impact of faulting, implying that movement along the Engadine Line there took place before 14,500 years ago but in the Late Pleistocene. Fault scarps in the Inn Valley associated with the Engadine Line have been degraded by glaciation. On the other hand, sackungen in the Bregaglia Valley which post-date the Last Glacial Maximum have been linked to tectonic activity on the Gruf Line, which otherwise shows no evidence of Quaternary activity. The deformation in the western Inn Valley-Bregaglia Valley may be of gravitational origin, however, although earthquakes on the Engadine Line may have triggered their movement.

The "beheading" of the Inn Valley at Maloja Pass, which took place between 29,400 and 14,500 years before present, is one of the major geologic events in the Quaternary of this sector of the Alps. Three valleys that formerly presumably fed the Inn Glacier were redirected into the Bregaglia Valley by a large collapse that caused the "beheading". Tectonic stresses exercised by movements along the Engadine Line may have caused the collapse, which left a steep escarpment at Maloja Pass and a large elevation difference between the Inn and Bregaglia valleys.

== Seismicity ==
It is possible, but unproven, that the Engadine Line may generate earthquakes. Minor seismic activity occurs in the Engadine defining the "Engadine seismogenic zone", which in the 1980 seismic hazard map of Switzerland was considered an area of significant seismic hazard. It appears to relate, in part, to northeast–southwest trending structures such as the Engadine Line. Earthquakes have been localized to the Engadine Line, but they are not intense, and seismicity disappears into the Inn Valley, where the Engadine Line fault continues. It decreases southwestwards away from the central and eastern Engadine. Seismic activity in the Venosta Valley may be related to the intersection between the Engadine Line and a north–south trending fault.

Some landslides in the region may have been triggered by earthquakes on the Engadine or Gruf lines. Turbidites in Lake Como and Lake Sils, dated to have occurred in AD 700, may relate to Engadine earthquakes. In the Ötz River valley in Austria, the Engadine Line and the Inntal fault have been related to increased earthquake activity, which may explain the occurrence of frequent landslides in the area. Research published in 1979 indicated that earthquakes on the Engadine Line might reach a maximum magnitude of M 5.5 or 6.9 with a break length of 40 ± 10 kilometres (24.9 ± 6.2 mi).

== Exhalations and springs ==
Hydrothermal activity has been associated with recent activity on the Engadine Line. In the Scuol-Tarasp area, mineral water and carbon dioxide rise to the surface (the latter forming mofettes) along the Engadine Line and its intersection with more local geologic lineaments. The waters most likely form along the plane of the fault.
