= Chaviolas =

Coordinates: 46°25′17″N 9°44′46″E

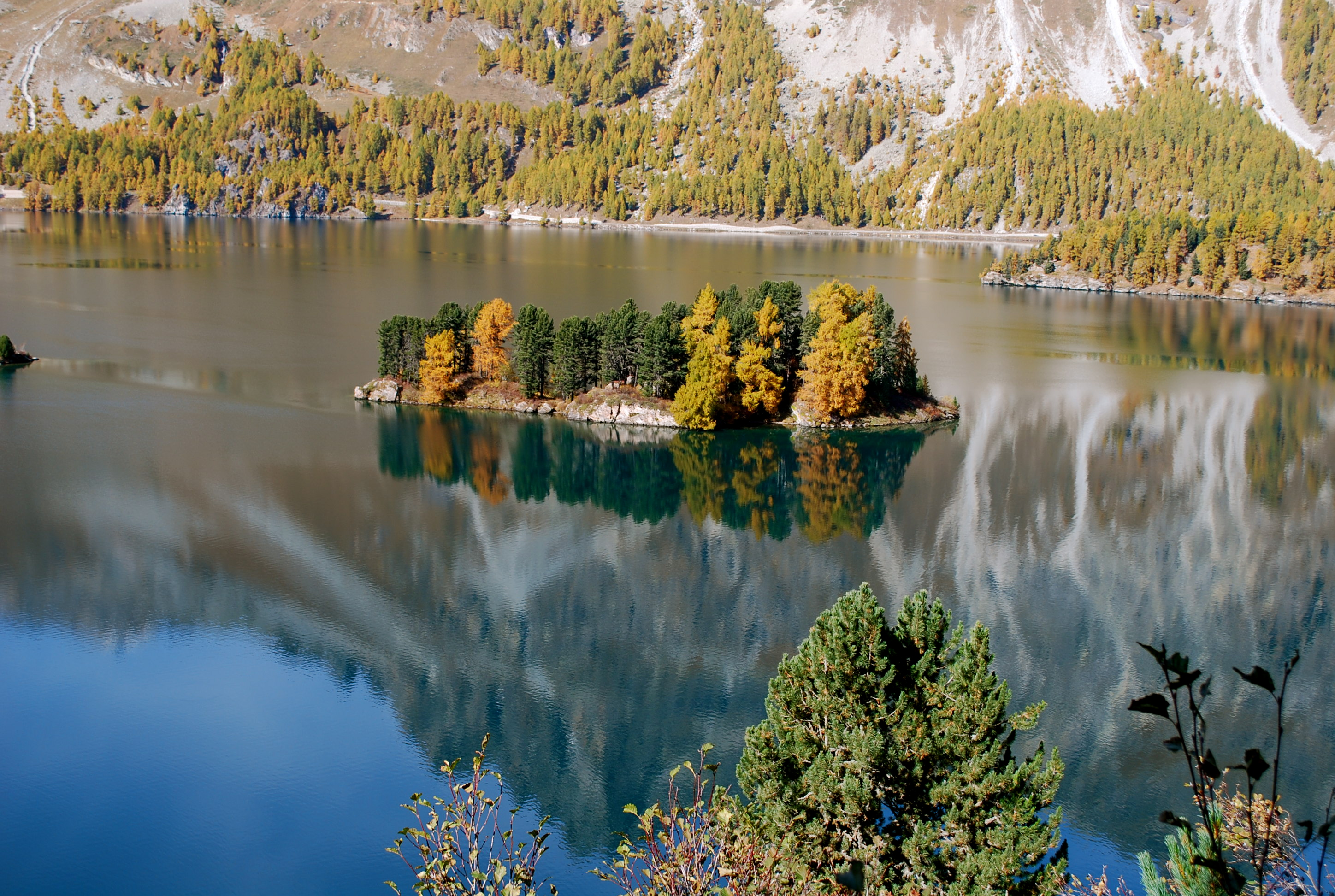
- View from the south side

Geography
- Location: Lake Sils
- Area: 0.39 ha (0.96 acres)
- Highest elevation: 1,809 m (5935 ft)

Administration
- Switzerland
- Canton: Graubünden
- District: Maloja

Chaviolas is an island in Lake Sils, located in the canton of Graubünden. It is the largest island in Lake Sils, the second largest being located 100 metres (330 feet) west. The island has a maximum length of 120 metres (390 feet) and a maximum width of 55 metres (180 feet) and includes a 40-metre (130-foot) triangular bay on its northern side. Its highest point is 1,809 metres (5,935 feet) above sea level or 12 metres (39 feet) above lake level (1,797 metres or 5,896 feet), making it among the highest islands in Switzerland and in the Alps. Its surface is entirely wooded. The island lies in the bay south of the peninsula of Chastè, about 200 metres (660 feet) from the shore.

Politically the island belongs to the municipality of Sils im Engadin/Segl in the district of Maloja.

== See also ==
- List of islands of Switzerland

== Bibliography ==
- Barbara Heé (2009). Chaviolas: A Landscape, So Intimate and Aloof. Lars Müller Publishers, Baden
- Swisstopo topographic maps
