= Nietzsche-Haus, Sils Maria =

House in Switzerland

Coordinates: 46°25′44″N 9°45′53″E

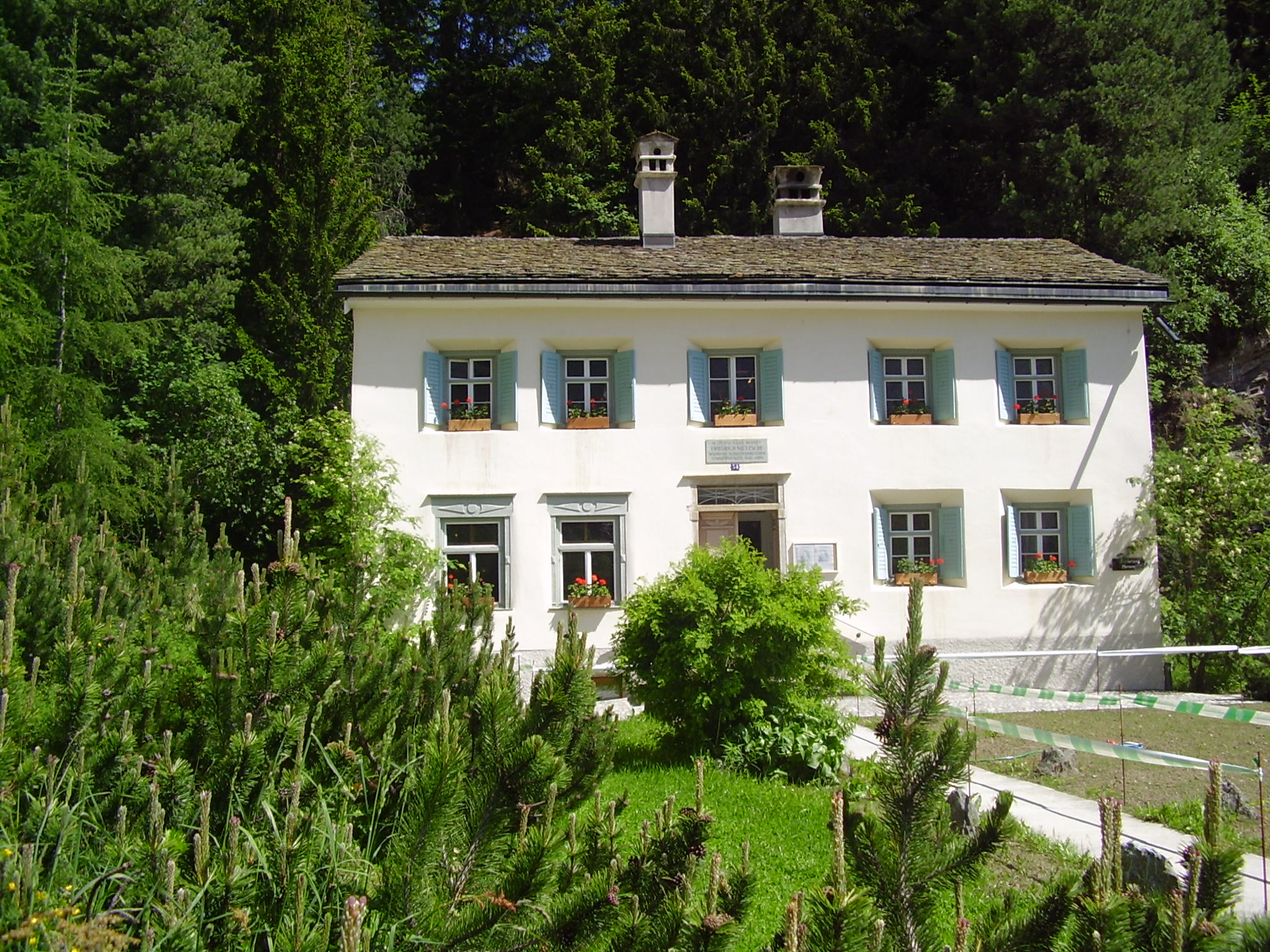
The Nietzsche-Haus in Sils Maria

The Nietzsche-Haus is a house in Sils Maria in the Engadin region of Switzerland, where the German philosopher Friedrich Nietzsche lived during the summers of 1881 and from 1883 to 1888.

== Nietzsche's visits ==
Friedrich Nietzsche rented a modest room in the Durisch family's house in the heart of Sils Maria for seven summers (1881 and 1883–88). The nearly 200-year-old house was owned by the Durisch family and continued to be privately owned for many years after Nietzsche's visits.

== Museum ==
In 1958 the house was sold to the "Nietzsche House Sils-Maria Foundation", which had it renovated and opened a museum there on 25 August 1960, the 60th anniversary of Nietzsche's death.

The museum contains five permanent exhibits, including a representation of the room Nietzsche rented from the Durischs, and a replica of his study in Basel. There is a room devoted to Oscar Levy, who oversaw the first translation of Nietzsche's works into English, and one about Sils' literary connexions. Finally, there is a room which hosts temporary exhibitions including art exhibitions.

The Nietzsche-Haus possesses a library open to researchers that contains one of the world's largest multi-language collections of books on the philosopher. The library also contains three collections of books that were donated to the library: Oscar Levy's collection; Hans Erich Lampl's collection (a Nietzsche scholar); and Albi Rosenthal's collection (an antiquarian bookseller). It is possible for scholars to stay at the house for brief periods in order to consult the library.

Each year the museum hosts the Nietzsche Colloquium, for discussion about Nietzsche's work and impact.

== See also ==
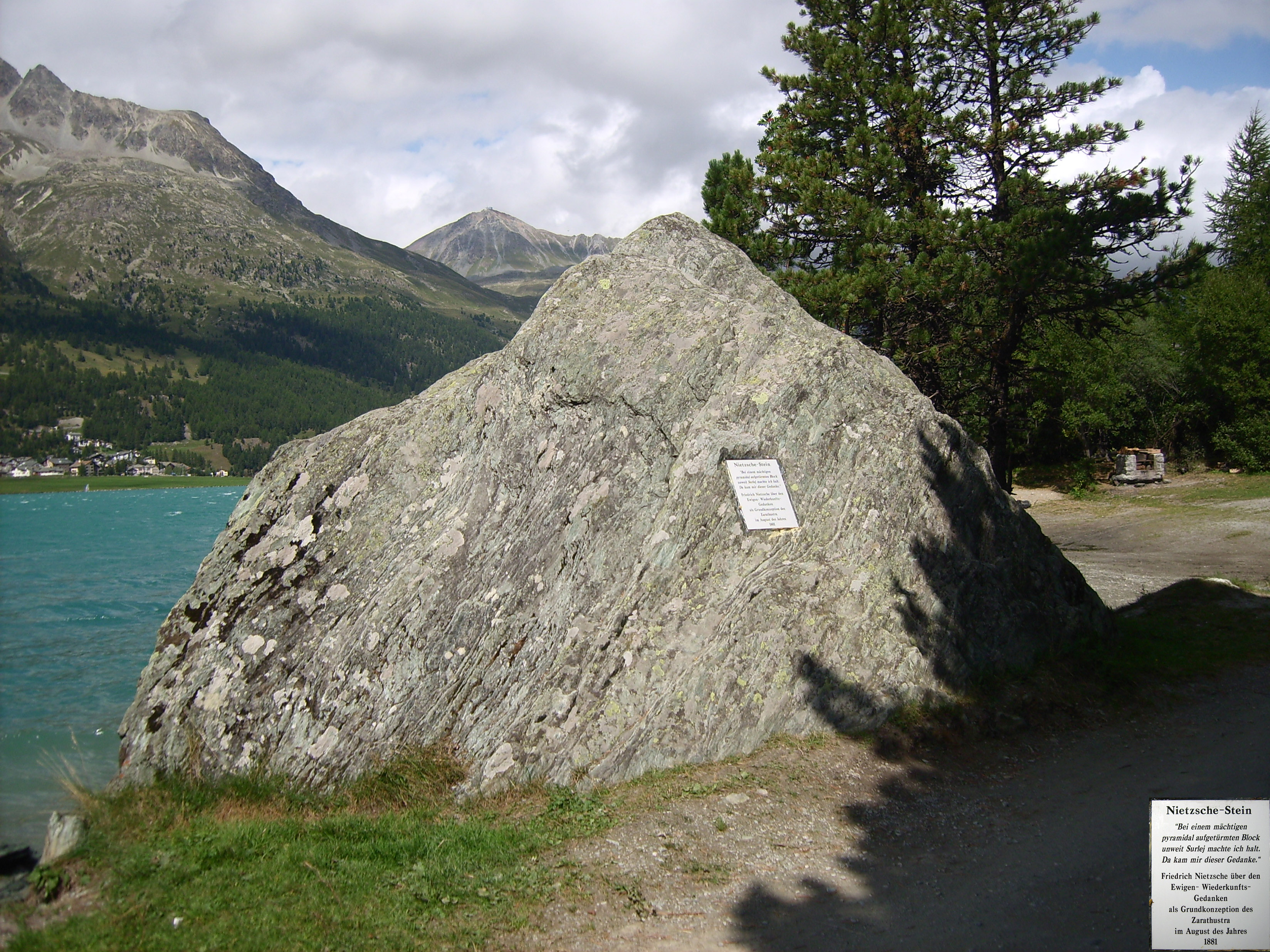
The Nietzsche Stone is nearby, on the shore of Lake Silvaplana

- Nietzsche-Haus, Naumburg
- List of museums in the Grisons
- List of museums in Switzerland
