= Isola (Maloja) =

Village in Graubünden, Switzerland

Coordinates: 46°25′N 9°44′E

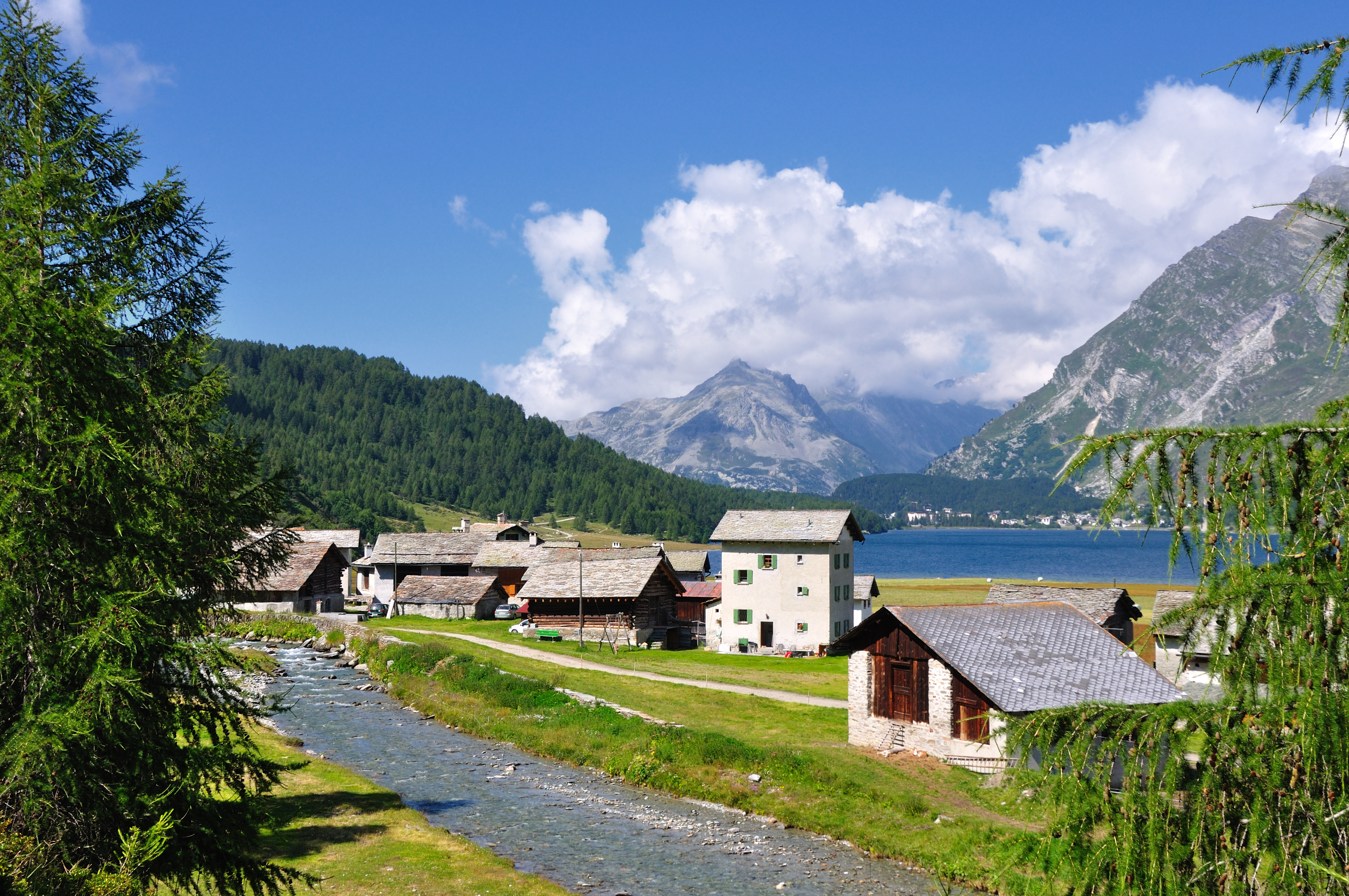
View of Isola and the river Aua da Fedoz

Isola is a village in Maloja, Graubünden, Switzerland. It is located on the shores of Lake Sils at the end of Val Fedoz.
