= Sils im Engadin/Segl =

- Municipality
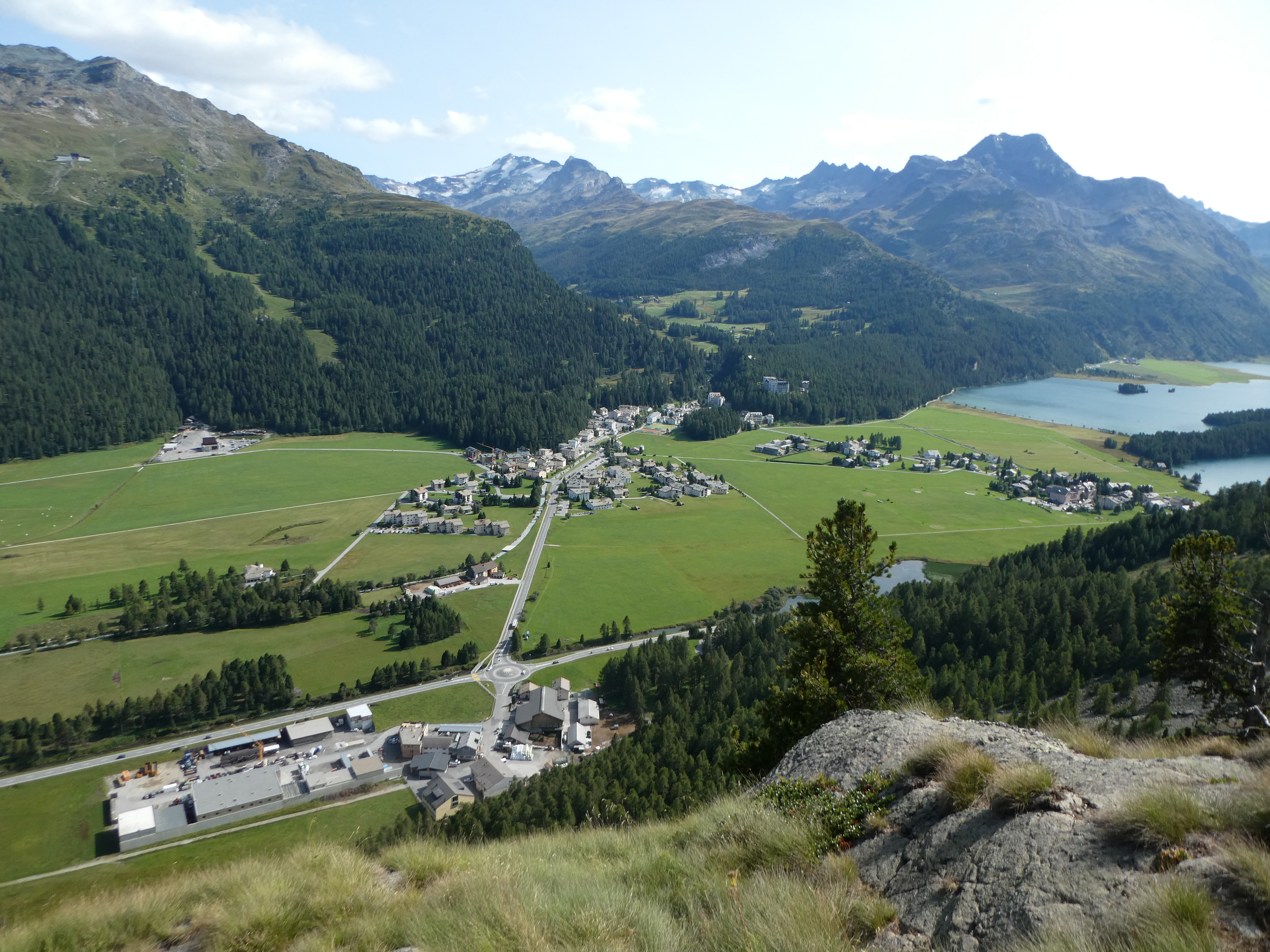
- Segl Maria (left) and Segl Baselgia (right)

- Flag Coat of arms
- Location of Sils im Engadin/Segl
- Location within Switzerland Location within Canton of Grisons
- Coordinates: 46°26′N 9°46′E
- Country: Switzerland
- Canton: Grisons
- District: Maloja

Area
  - Total: 63.54 km^{2} (24.53 sq mi)
- Elevation (Church Segl Maria): 1,809 m (5,935 ft)

Population (December 2015)
  - Total: 761
  - Density: 12.0/km^{2} (31.0/sq mi)
- Time zone: UTC+01:00 (CET)
  - Summer (DST): UTC+02:00 (CEST)
- Postal code: 7514, 7515, 7517
- SFOS number: 3789
- ISO 3166 code: CH-GR
- Localities: Segl Maria, Segl Baselgia, Seglias, Val Fex as well as Grevasalvas, Blaunca and Buaira
- Surrounded by: Bivio, Chiesa in Valmalenco (IT-SO), Lanzada (IT-SO), Samedan, Silvaplana, Stampa
- Website: www.sils-segl.ch

Sils im Engadin/Segl (German: Sils im Engadin; Romansh Segl) is a municipality in the Maloja Region, Upper Engadine in the Swiss canton of the Grisons. It consists of:

- two villages, Segl Maria (Romansh, German: Sils Maria; Seglias is part of Segl Maria) and Segl Baselgia (German: Sils Baselgia; Baselgia is Romansh for church)
- the Val Fex (German: Fextal) and
- three Maiensässe, or Alpine pastures, used for spring grazing, namely Grevasalvas, Blaunca and Buaira, above Plaun da Lej

== Name and coat of arms ==
The municipality's official label uses both the German and the Romansh versions of its name: Segl is the Romansh version while Sils im Engadin is the German. Engadin is Romansh for "Valley of the Inn (Romansh: En)", the river, which flows northeast from Maloja through Sils Baselgia and eventually into the Danube at Passau, Germany at the German-Austrian border.

Sils i.E is distinguished from Sils im Domleschg in another Swiss watershed. Sils was originally divided into the three hamlets of Segl Baselgia, Segl Maria, and Seglias.

The coat of arms is Per fess Azure a Sun radiated Or and Or a Trout Azure spotted Gules. It shows a blue upper half with a golden sun and a yellow lower section with a blue trout. It is a combination of the historical village coats of arms, and represents the municipality's sunny, elevated location and the fish-filled Lake Sils.

== History ==
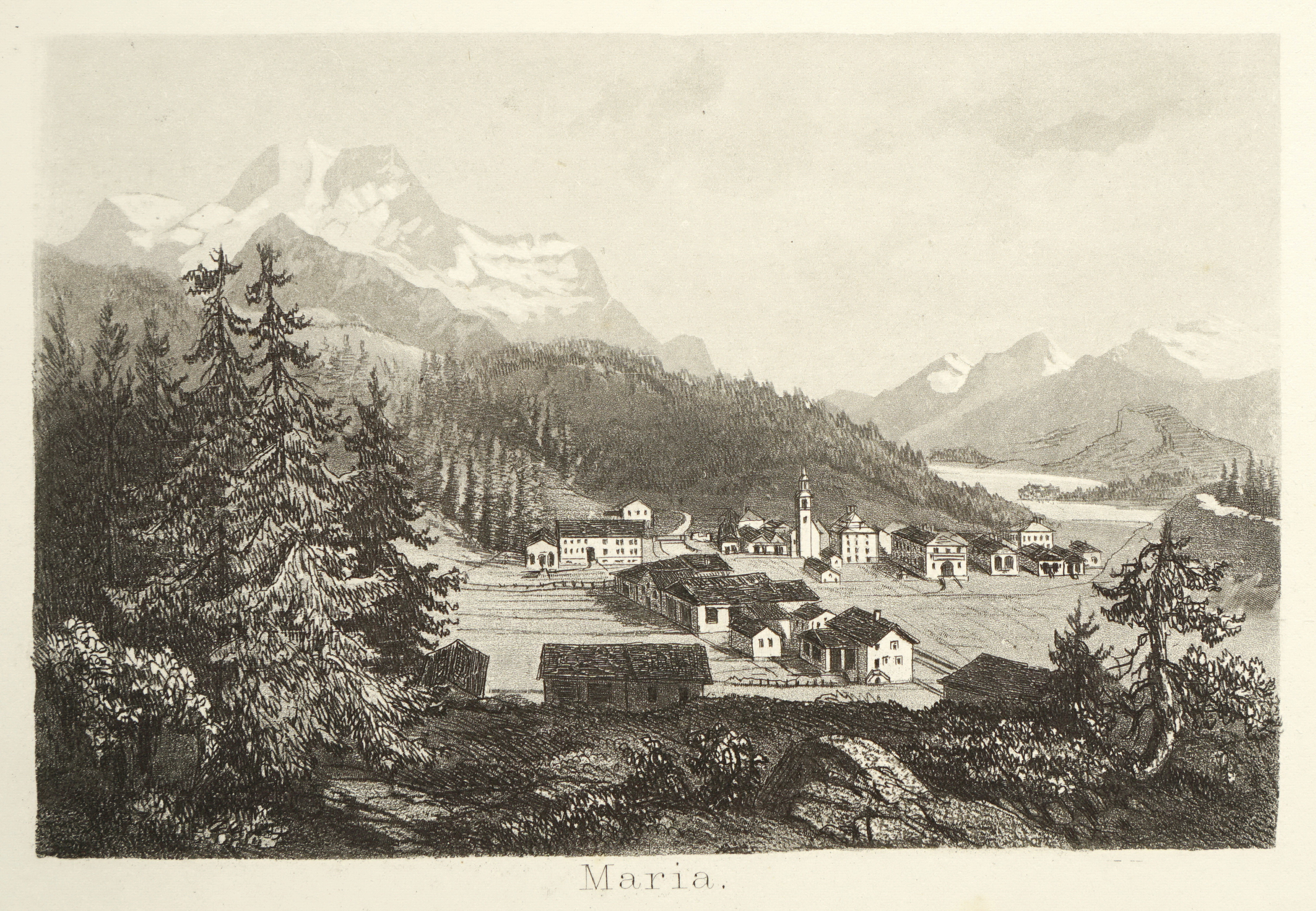
Segl Maria c. 1870. Etching by Heinrich Müller

Sils im Engadin/Segl is first mentioned around 800–850 as Silles. In 1131 it was mentioned as Sillis.

Four little votive altars from Roman times, found in Segl Baselgia, suggest that there was a sanctuary on the Roman trade route leading over the Maloja Pass and the Julier Pass. In the Middle Ages, Sils/Segl was a reloading point on this route. Remains of a medieval castle are located on the Chastè peninsula in Lake Sils. In the Late Middle Ages, fishing was a major source of income: Salted and smoked trout were exported to Italy.

In the 19th century, numerous citizens of Sils/Segl emigrated; some of them returned wealthy and brought prosperity to the village. In the second half of the 19th century and in the 20th century, tourism became more and more important to Sils/Segl. Friedrich Nietzsche spent the summers here from 1881 to 1888. The house in which he lived has been a museum since 1960: the Nietzsche-Haus. The Waldhaus hotel was opened in 1908; among its guests were numerous artists, musicians, writers and philosophers. With the opening of the Aerial tramway to Furtschellas in 1972, Sils/Segl also became a winter resort.

== Geography ==
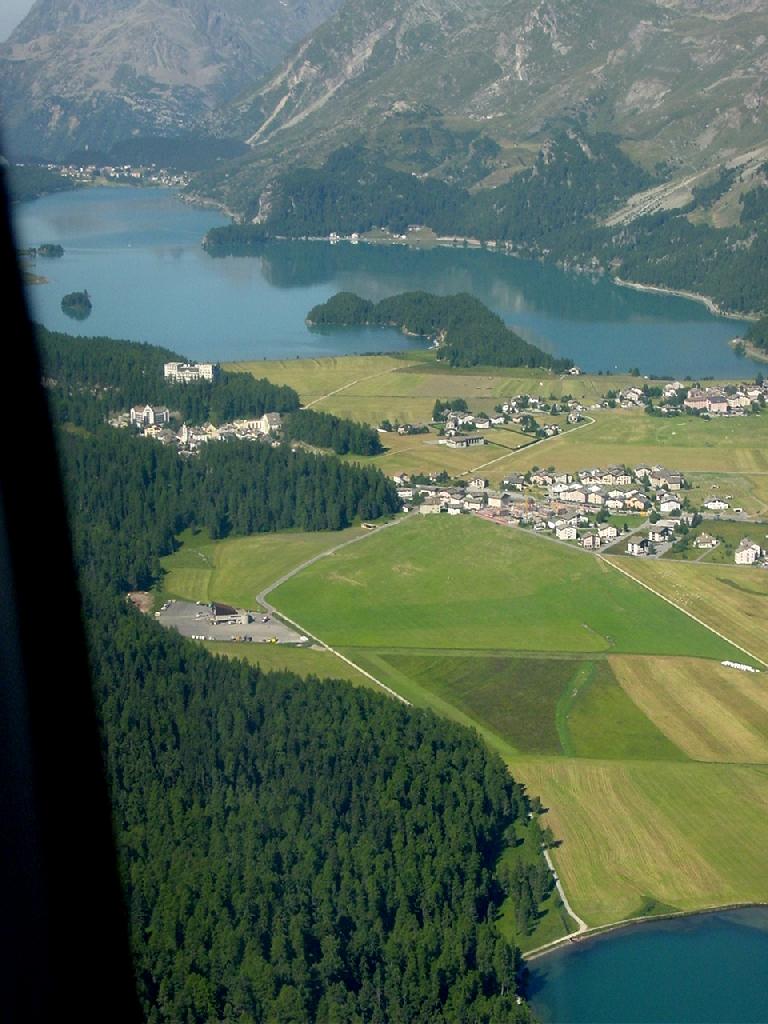
Sils and Lake Sils

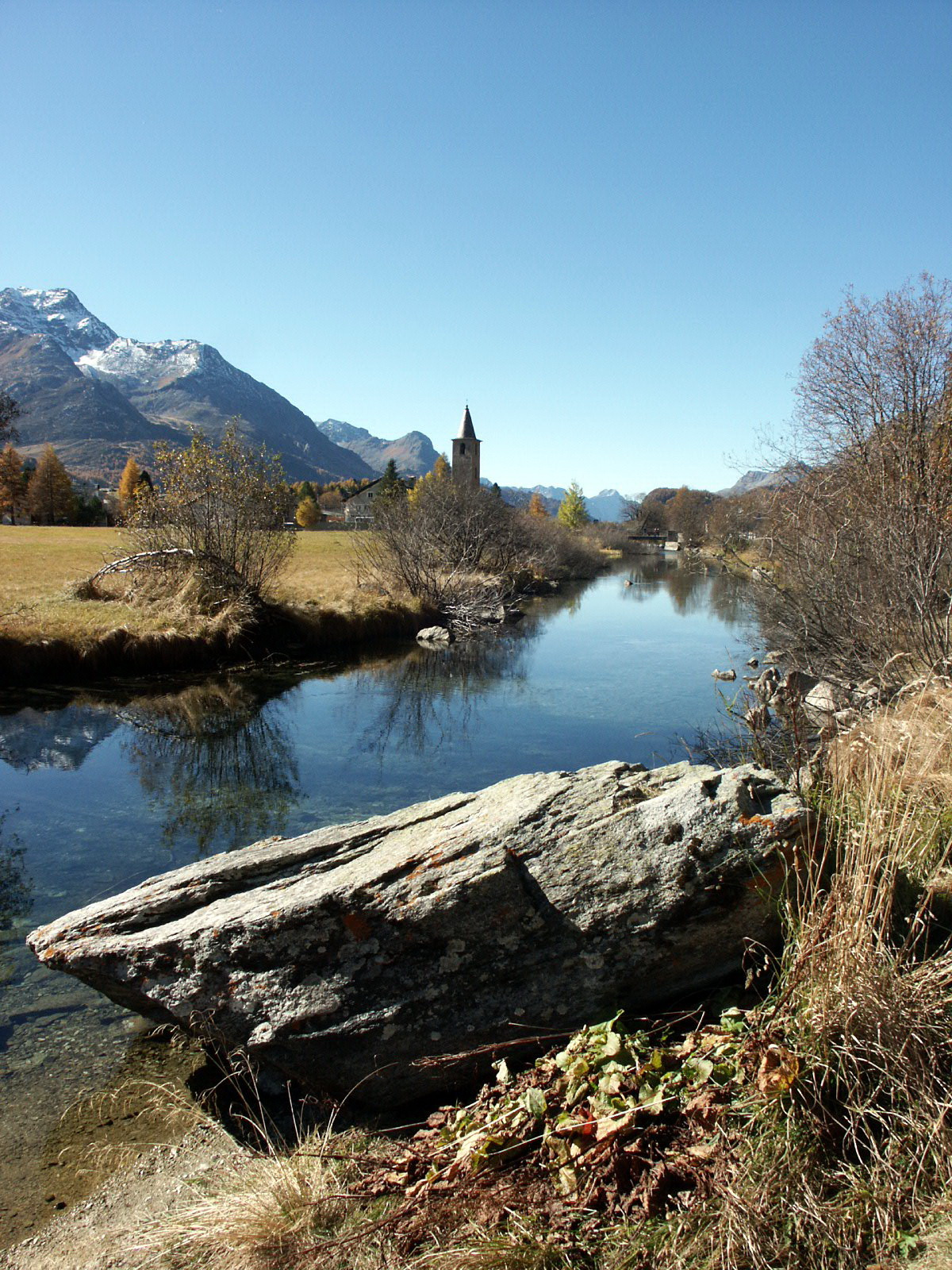
Segl Maria with the church in Segl Baselgia in the background

Located in the valley of Upper Engadine, Sils i.E./Segl nestles between Lake Sils and Lake Silvaplana at the foot of Piz Corvatsch and Piz da la Margna and below the Val Fex, a valley in the south. The municipality belongs to the Maloja District.

Sils im Engadin/Segl has an area (as of the 2004/09 survey) of 63.58 km^{2} (24.55 sq mi). About 25.9% is agricultural, while 11.1% is forested. Of the rest, 1.2% is developed (buildings or roads) and 61.7% is unproductive. In the 2004/09 survey, 38 ha (94 acres), or about 0.6% of the total area, was covered with buildings, an increase of 5 ha (12 acres) from 1985. Over the same time period, the amount of recreational space increased by 6 ha (15 acres) and is now about 0.16% of the total area. Of the agricultural land, 307 ha (760 acres) are fields and grasslands, and 1,435 ha (3,550 acres) are alpine grazing areas. Since 1985, the agricultural land has decreased by 119 ha (290 acres) and the forested land increased by 117 ha (290 acres). Rivers and lakes cover 404 ha (1,000 acres).

The plain is grass-covered, and the steep slopes are heavily forested.

== Demographics ==
Sils im Engadin/Segl has a population (as of December 2020) of 715. As of 2014, 38.5% of the population are resident foreign nationals. In 2015, 144 people or 18.9% of the population were born in Portugal, 42 or 5.5% of the population were born in Germany and 63 or 8.3% of the population were born in Italy. Over the last 4 years (2010–2014) the population has changed at a rate of 2.13%. The birth rate in the municipality, in 2014, was 15.7, while the death rate was 1.3 per thousand residents.

As of 2014, children and teenagers (0–19 years old) make up 17.3% of the population, while adults (20–64 years old) are 65.9% and seniors (over 64 years old) make up 16.8%. In 2015 there were 299 single residents, 381 people who were married or in a civil partnership, 37 widows or widowers and 44 divorced residents.

In 2014 there were 401 private households in Sils im Engadin/Segl with an average household size of 1.91 persons. Of the 253 inhabited buildings in the municipality, in 2000, about 34.8% were single family homes and 36.0% were multiple family buildings. Additionally, about 32.0% of the buildings were built before 1919, while 7.5% were built between 1991 and 2000. In 2013 the rate of construction of new housing units per 1000 residents was 26.46. The vacancy rate for the municipality, in 2015, was 1.2%.

The historical population is given in the following chart:

== Languages ==
Aerial view of Segl Maria from 1900 m by Walter Mittelholzer (1927)

Most of the population (as of 2000) speaks German (59.4%), with Italian being second most common (15.4%) and Romansh being third (12.0%). Into the 19th century, the entire population spoke the Upper-Engadin Romansh dialect of Putèr. Due to increasing trade with the outside world, Romansh usage began to decline. In 1880 about 68% spoke Romansh as a first language, while in 1910 it was only 56% and in 1941 it increased to 61.5%. In the 1960s German became the majority language. However, in 2000 there were 33% of the population who at least understood Romansh.

Languages in Sils im Engadin/Segl
Languages	Census 1980		Census 1990		Census 2000	
Languages	Number	Percent	Number	Percent	Number	Percent
German	210	48.39%	291	58.43%	446	59.39%
Romansh	137	31.57%	122	24.50%	90	11.98%
Italian	67	15.44%	71	14.26%	116	15.45%
Population	434	100%	498	100%	751	100%

== Politics ==
In the 2015 federal election the most popular party was the FDP with 28.5% of the vote. The next three most popular parties were the BDP (24.0%), the SVP (18.5%) and the SP (16.9%). In the federal election, a total of 169 votes were cast, and the voter turnout was 40.6%.

In the 2007, federal election the most popular party was the SVP which received 34.6% of the vote. The next three most popular parties were the SP (29.3%), the FDP (26.6%) and the CVP (7.2%).

== Education ==
In Sils im Engadin/Segl, about 70.6% of the population (between age 25–64) have completed either non-mandatory upper secondary education or additional higher education (either university or a Fachhochschule).

== Economy ==
Sils im Engadin/Segl is classed as a tourist community.

As of 2014, there were a total of 955 people employed in the municipality. Of these, a total of 24 people worked in 8 businesses in the primary economic sector. The secondary sector employed 132 workers in 18 separate businesses, of which 5 were small businesses with a total of 94 employees. Finally, the tertiary sector provided 799 jobs in 85 businesses. There were 14 small businesses with a total of 338 employees and two mid sized businesses with a total of 201 employees. In 2014 a total of 26.5% of the population received social assistance.

In the second quarter of 2016 an average of 251 workers commuted from outside Switzerland to work in the municipality, representing a large minority of the employees.

In 2015 local hotels had a total of 196,257 overnight stays, of which 37.6% were international visitors.

== Transportation ==
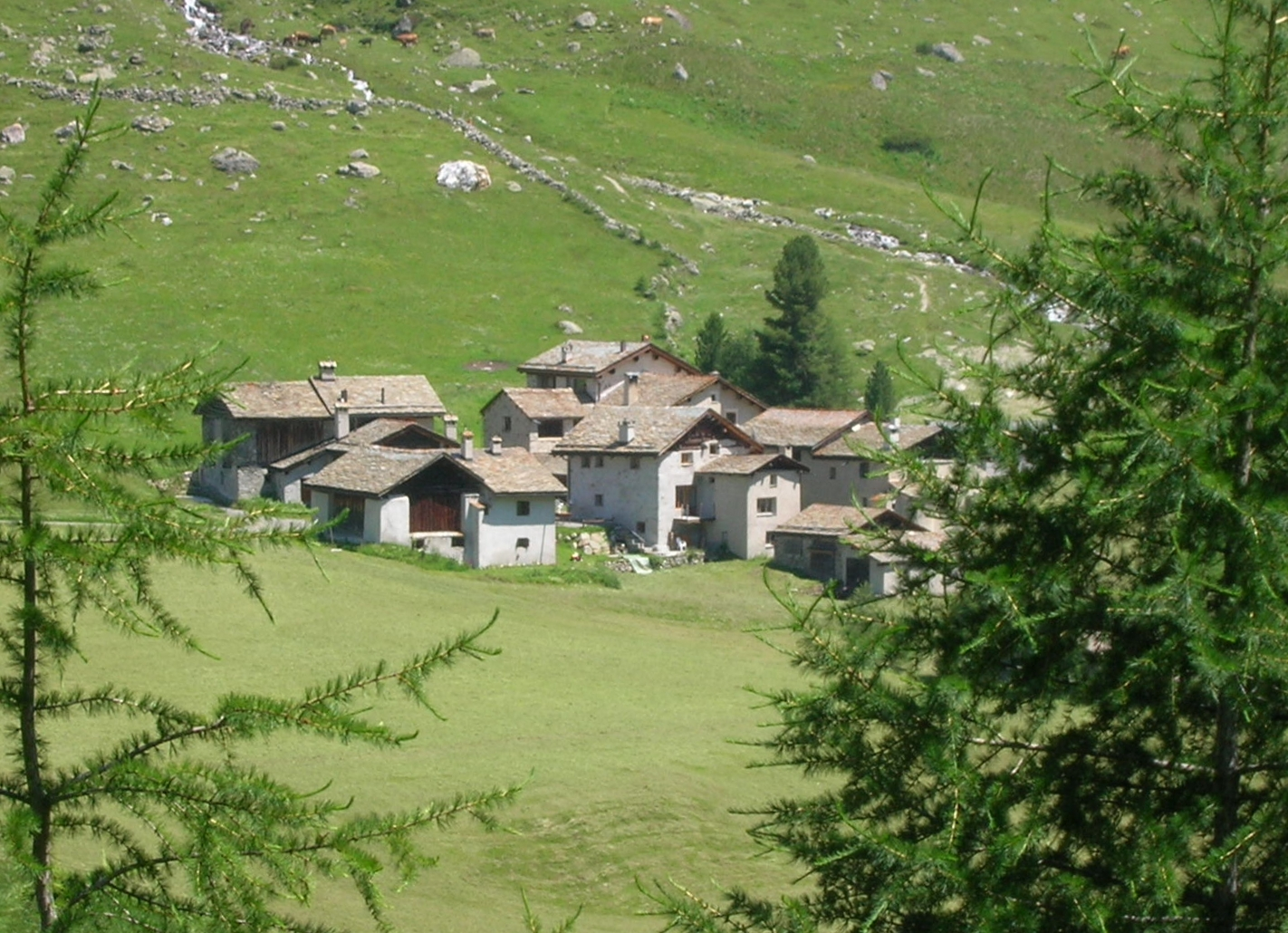
Settlement in the Fex Valley

The Fex Valley is officially car-free except for residents of the valley. The Furtschellas cable car begins near the village and leads to many ski runs and, in summer, to trails above the tree line.

== Climate ==
Sils-Segl Maria features a cold subarctic climate (Dfc) on Köppen classification.

Climate data for Segl-Maria, elevation 1,804 m (5,919 ft), (1991–2020)
Month	Jan	Feb	Mar	Apr	May	Jun	Jul	Aug	Sep	Oct	Nov	Dec	Year
Mean daily maximum °C (°F)	−1.3 (29.7)	−0.2 (31.6)	2.7 (36.9)	5.7 (42.3)	11.0 (51.8)	15.3 (59.5)	17.6 (63.7)	17.0 (62.6)	12.7 (54.9)	8.8 (47.8)	3.4 (38.1)	−0.3 (31.5)	7.7 (45.9)
Daily mean °C (°F)	−6.8 (19.8)	−6.3 (20.7)	−2.6 (27.3)	1.2 (34.2)	6.0 (42.8)	9.8 (49.6)	11.8 (53.2)	11.7 (53.1)	7.8 (46.0)	3.8 (38.8)	−1.2 (29.8)	−4.9 (23.2)	2.5 (36.5)
Mean daily minimum °C (°F)	−12.6 (9.3)	−12.8 (9.0)	−8.5 (16.7)	−4.0 (24.8)	0.7 (33.3)	3.9 (39.0)	5.8 (42.4)	6.0 (42.8)	2.8 (37.0)	−0.9 (30.4)	−5.3 (22.5)	−9.6 (14.7)	−2.9 (26.8)
Average precipitation mm (inches)	48.2 (1.90)	34.2 (1.35)	46.7 (1.84)	62.5 (2.46)	90.2 (3.55)	113.0 (4.45)	108.6 (4.28)	127.4 (5.02)	96.9 (3.81)	105.8 (4.17)	104.0 (4.09)	56.5 (2.22)	994.0 (39.13)
Average snowfall cm (inches)	60.3 (23.7)	46.7 (18.4)	53.9 (21.2)	44.4 (17.5)	7.7 (3.0)	0.3 (0.1)	0.2 (0.1)	0.1 (0.0)	3.3 (1.3)	16.6 (6.5)	54.8 (21.6)	58.5 (23.0)	346.8 (136.5)
Average precipitation days (≥ 1.0 mm)	7.0	5.6	6.1	8.2	10.7	11.4	11.3	11.4	8.2	8.9	8.9	8.0	105.7
Average snowy days (≥ 1.0 cm)	7.0	6.2	5.9	5.3	1.2	0.1	0.0	0.0	0.5	2.0	6.2	7.4	41.8
Average relative humidity (%)	75	71	71	73	74	74	74	76	77	77	77	76	75
Source 1: NOAA
Source 2: MeteoSwiss

== Notable residents and visitors ==
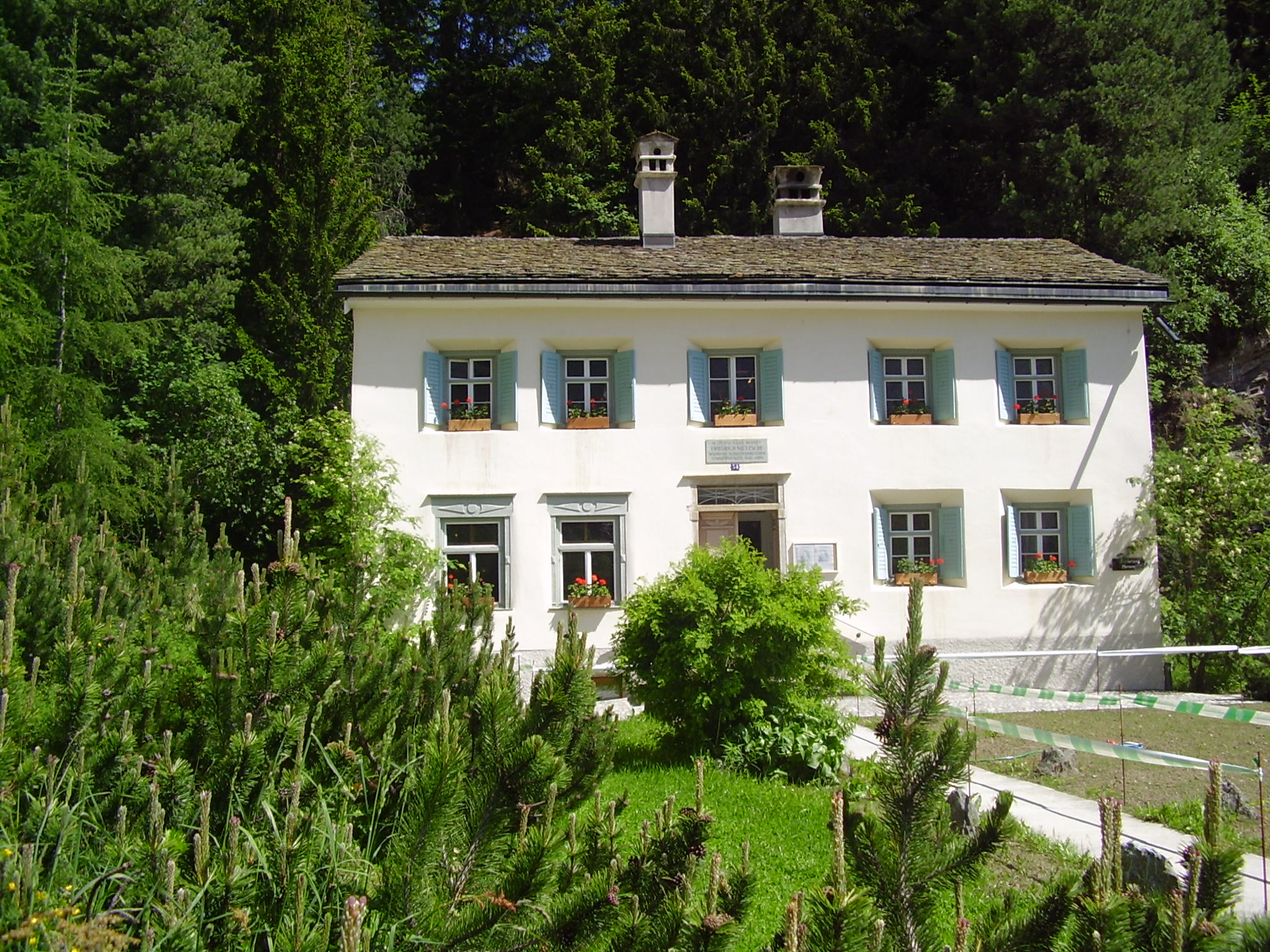
Nietzsche's summer home in Sils, now a museum

Philosopher Friedrich Nietzsche summered in Sils in 1881 and between 1883 and 1888, and the house he lived in – the Nietzsche-Haus – is now a small museum. Anne Frank was in Sils for several vacations, and Hermann Hesse also visited Sils. Annemarie Schwarzenbach lived in Sils since 1935 and died there in 1942 after a bicycle accident.

== In popular culture ==
The area is the setting for much of the film Clouds of Sils Maria (2014), written and directed by Olivier Assayas, and starring Juliette Binoche, Kristen Stewart and Chloë Grace Moretz. Part of Coda (2019), starring Patrick Stewart, was also filmed there, in the countryside and at the Waldhaus Sils Hotel.
