= Silvaplana =

- Municipality
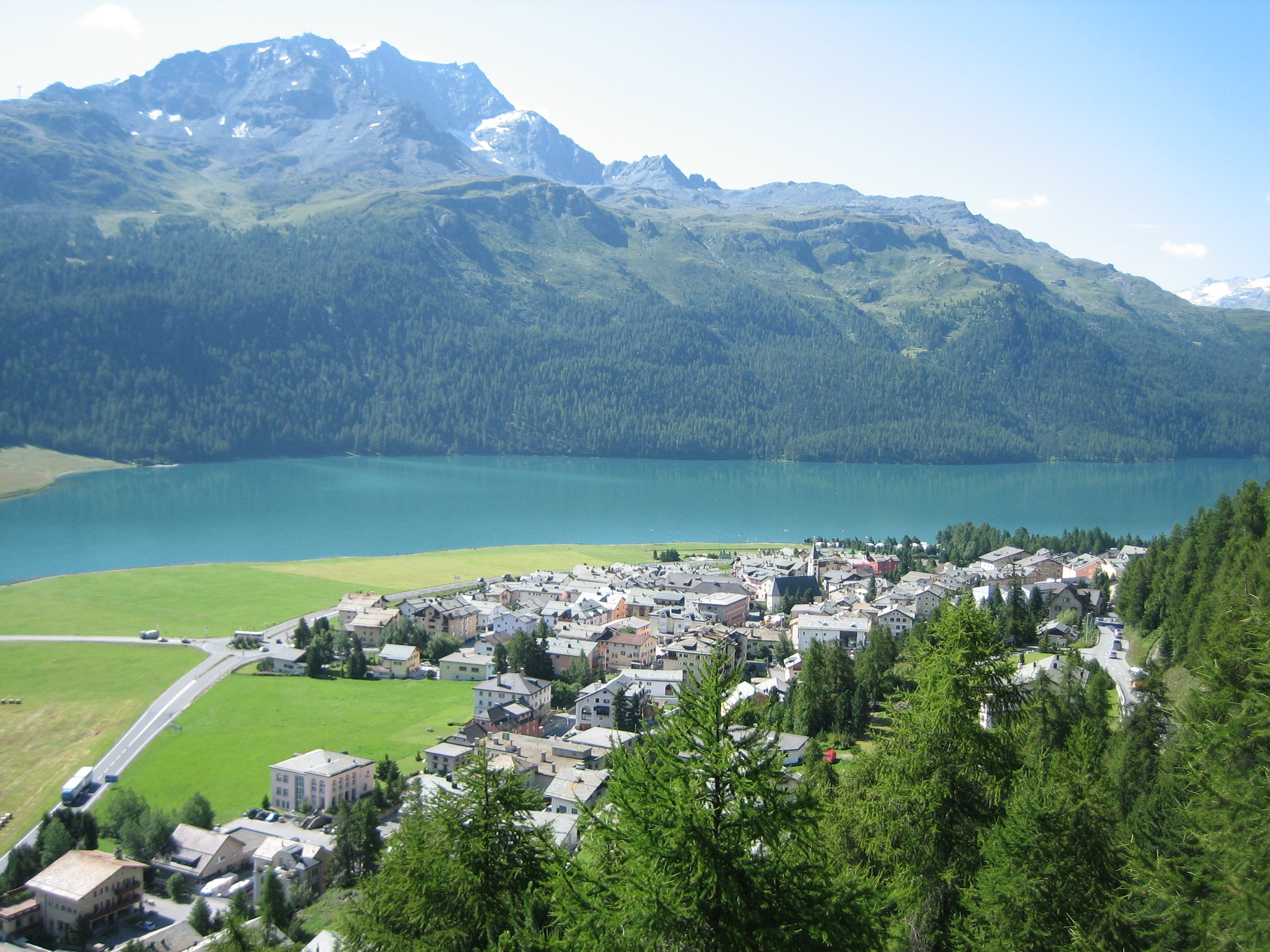

- Flag Coat of arms
- Location of Silvaplana
- Location within Switzerland Location within Canton of Grisons
- Coordinates: 46°28′N 9°48′E
- Country: Switzerland
- Canton: Grisons
- District: Maloja

Area
  - Total: 44.71 km^{2} (17.26 sq mi)
- Elevation: 1,815 m (5,955 ft)

Population (December 2020)
  - Total: 1,121
  - Density: 25.07/km^{2} (64.94/sq mi)
- Time zone: UTC+01:00 (CET)
  - Summer (DST): UTC+02:00 (CEST)
- Postal code: 7513
- SFOS number: 3790
- ISO 3166 code: CH-GR
- Surrounded by: Bever, Bivio, Samedan, Sankt-Moritz, Sils im Engadin/Segl
- Website: https://gemeinde-silvaplana.ch

Silvaplana (Romansh: Silvaplauna) is a municipality in the Maloja Region in the Swiss canton of the Grisons and the name of a lake in the municipality.

== History ==
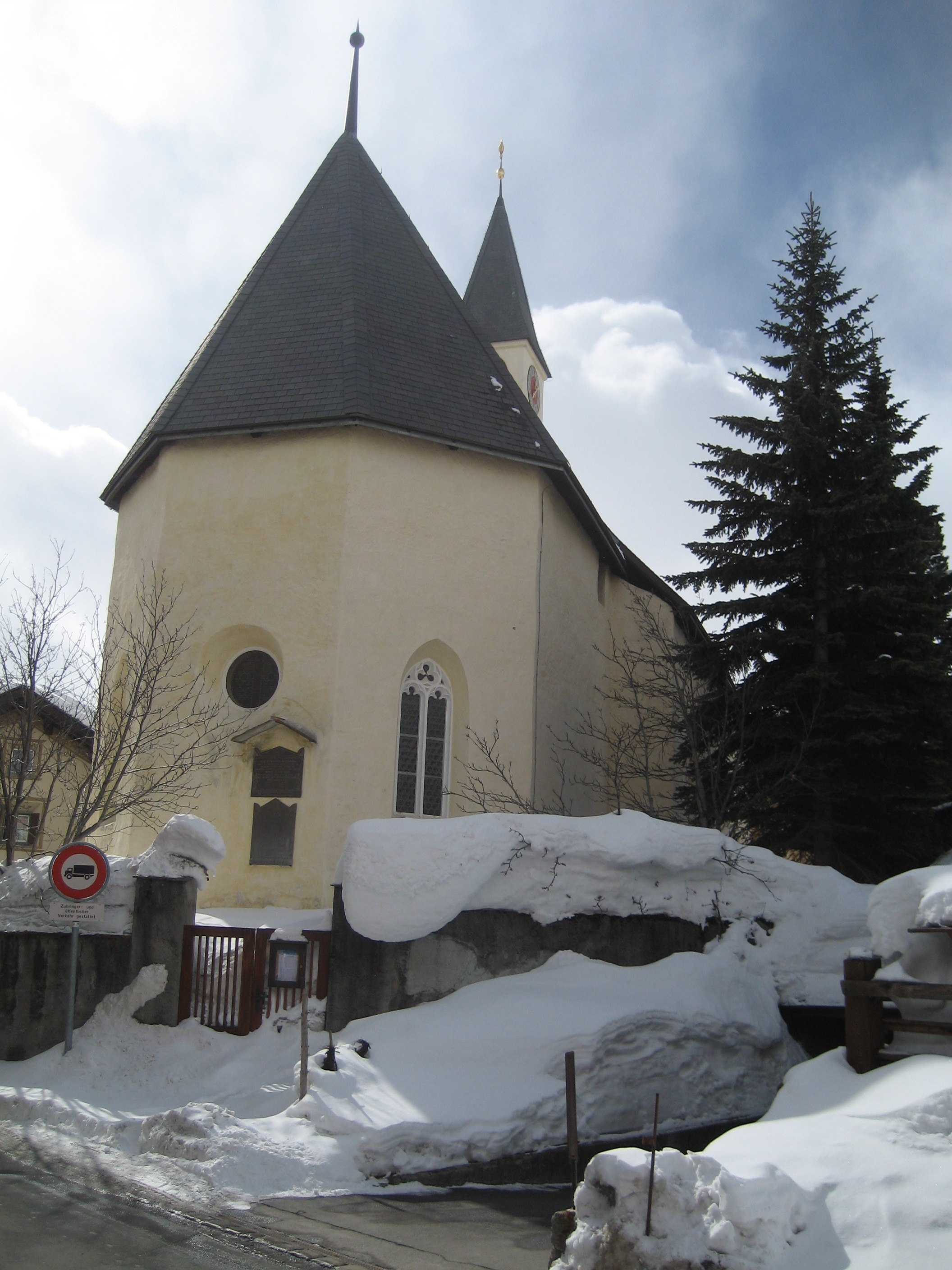
Village church in Silvaplana

The first sign of a settlement in the borders of the municipality is some Roman-era broken pillars on the Julier Pass. The village church was first mentioned in 1356. A new, late gothic church was built in 1491. In 1556 the village converted to the Protestant Reformation.

== Geography ==
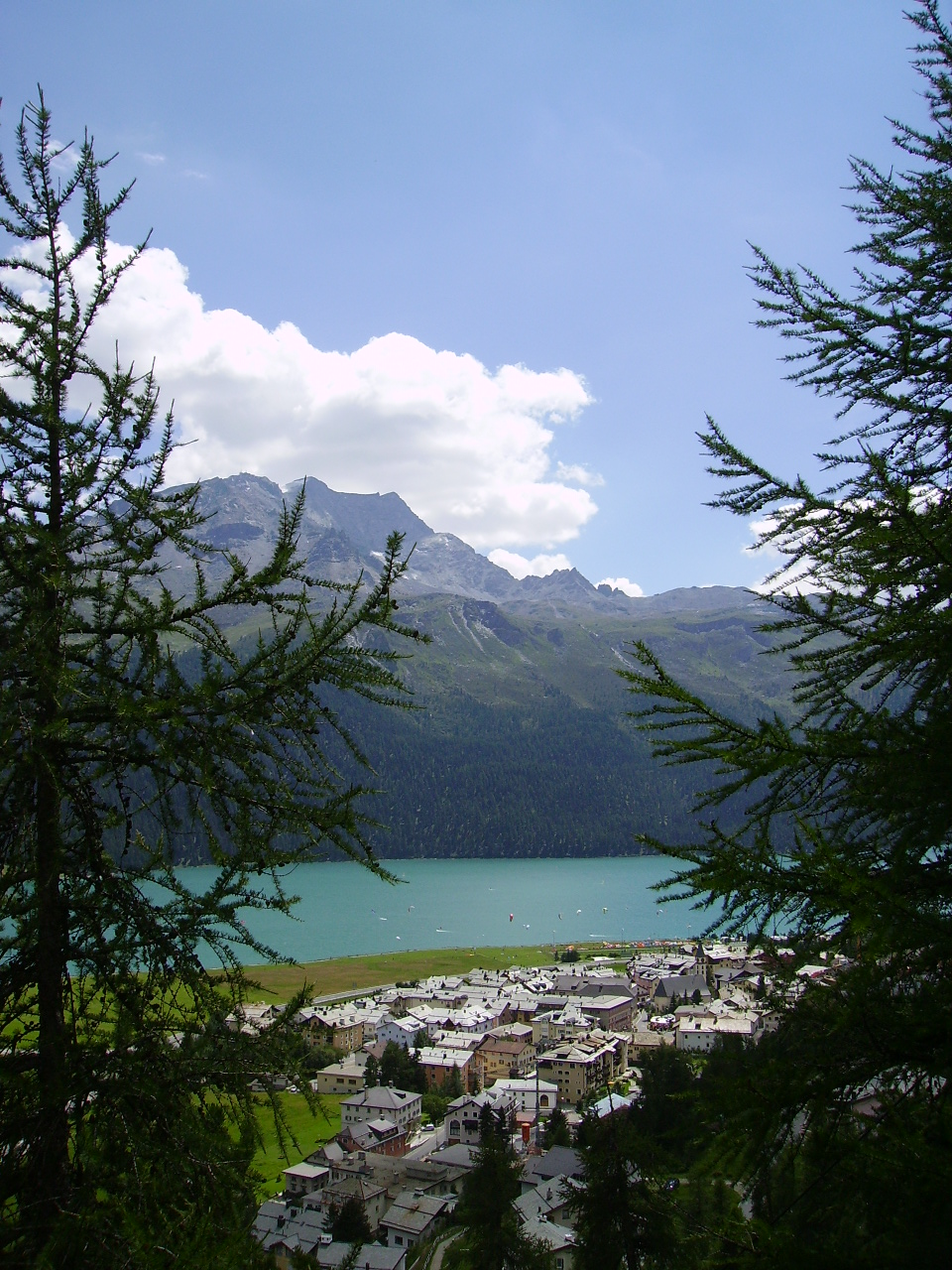
Silvaplana and Lake Silvaplana

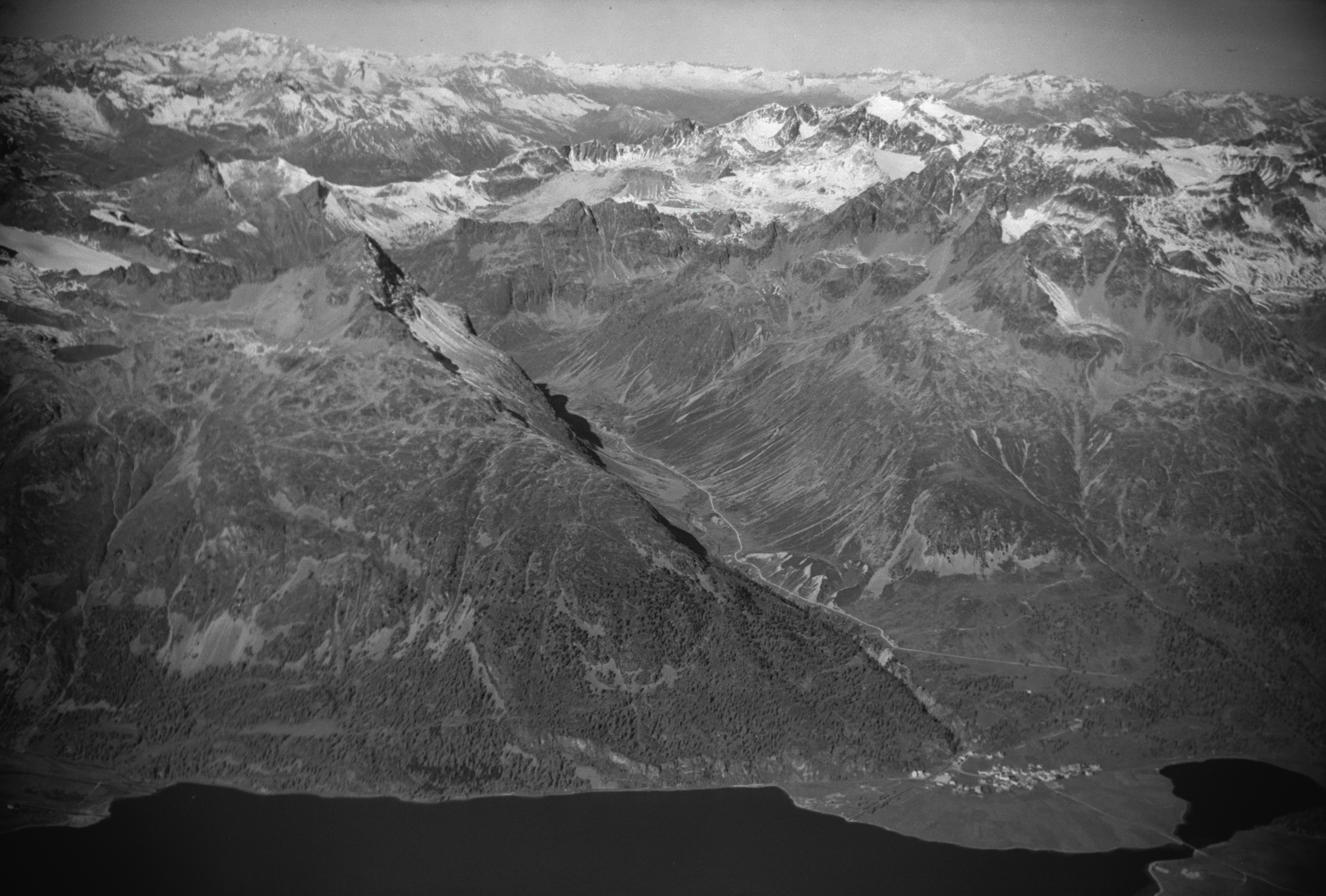
Aerial view by Walter Mittelholzer (1934)

Silvaplana has an area, as of 2006, of 44.7 km^{2} (17.3 sq mi). Of this area, 19.6% is used for agricultural purposes, while 14.1% is forested. Of the rest of the land, 2.2% is settled (buildings or roads) and the remainder (64.1%) is non-productive (rivers, glaciers or mountains).

Silvaplana is located on Lake Silvaplana in the Upper Engadine German: Oberengadin. Before 2017, it was located in the Oberengadin sub-district of the Maloja, after 2017 it was part of the Maloja Region. Above the village at 2,284 m (7,493 ft), the Julier Pass connects the Engadine valley to the rest of Grisons and the Rhine watershed. While the stream Ova dal Vallun, which connects Lake Silvaplana and Lake Champfèr, runs through the village, it consists of the village of Silvaplana and the hamlets of Surlej and Albana, as well as part of the village of Champfèr.

== Demographics ==
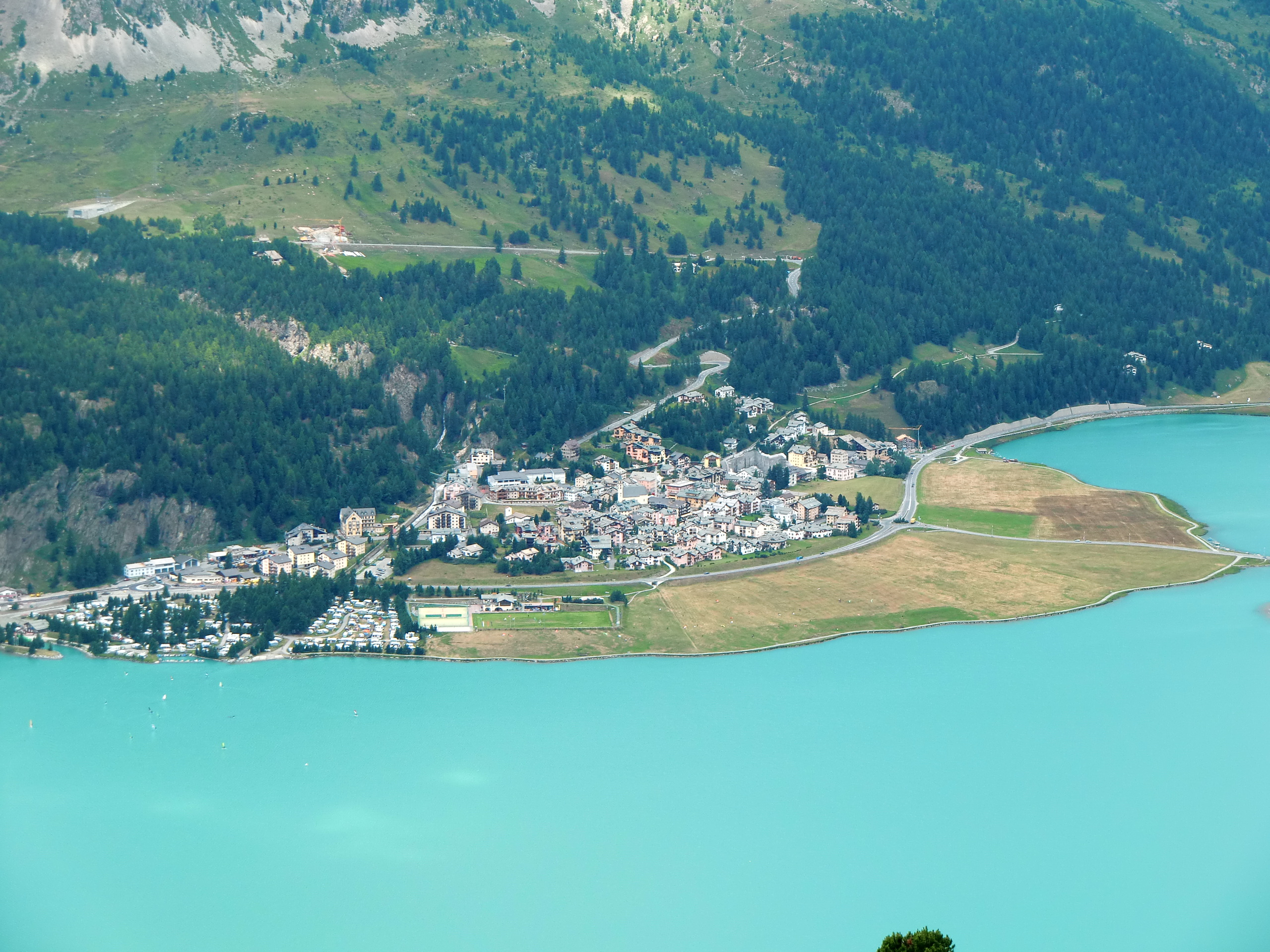
Silvaplana

Silvaplana has a population (as of 31 December 2020) of 1,121. As of 2008, 27.9% of the population was made up of foreign nationals. Over the last 10 years the population has grown at a rate of 11.1%. As of 2000, the gender distribution of the population was 49.7% male and 50.3% female.

The age distribution, as of 2000, in Silvaplana is; 79 children or 8.7% of the population are between 0 and 9 years old. 35 teenagers or 3.8% are 10 to 14, and 38 teenagers or 4.2% are 15 to 19. Of the adult population, 127 people or 13.9% of the population are between 20 and 29 years old. 188 people or 20.6% are 30 to 39, 140 people or 15.3% are 40 to 49, and 149 people or 16.3% are 50 to 59.

The senior population distribution is 88 people or 9.6% of the population are between 60 and 69 years old, 49 people or 5.4% are 70 to 79, there are 18 people or 2.0% who are 80 to 89, and there are 2 people or 0.2% who are 90 to 99.

In the 2007 federal election the most popular party was the SVP which received 36% of the vote. The next three most popular parties were the FDP (35.1%), the SP (17.6%) and the CVP (7.7%).

In Silvaplana about 75.2% of the population (between the age of 25-64) have completed either non-mandatory upper secondary education or additional higher education (either university or a Fachhochschule).

Silvaplana has an unemployment rate of 1.74%. As of 2005, there were 21 people employed in the primary economic sector and about 5 businesses involved in this sector. 95 people are employed in the secondary sector and there are 11 businesses in this sector. 492 people are employed in the tertiary sector, with 72 businesses in this sector.

The historical population is given in the following table:

year	population
1804	348
1850	205
1900	319
1950	333
1970	714
2000	913

== Languages ==
Most of the population (as of 2000) speaks German (65.9%), with Italian being second most common (15.9%) and Romansh being third (10.6%). Until the mid-19th Century, the entire population spoke the Upper-Engadine Romansh dialect of Puter. Due to increasing trade with the outside world, Romansh usage began to decline. In 1880 about 73.3% spoke Romansh as a first language, while in 1910 it was only 48.61%. The last time that Romansh was the majority language was in 1941 when 54.9% spoke it. By 1970 Romansh was a minority language with only 200 out of 714 (28.01%) speaking the language. Due to Romansh instruction in the village school, in 2000 there were 34.1% who at least understood Romansh.

Languages in Silvaplana
Languages	Census 1980		Census 1990		Census 2000	
Languages	Number	Percent	Number	Percent	Number	Percent
German	346	43.80%	434	60.28%	602	65.94%
Romansh	207	26.20%	141	19.58%	97	10.62%
Italian	138	17.47%	127	17.64%	145	15.88%
Population	790	100%	720	100%	913	100%

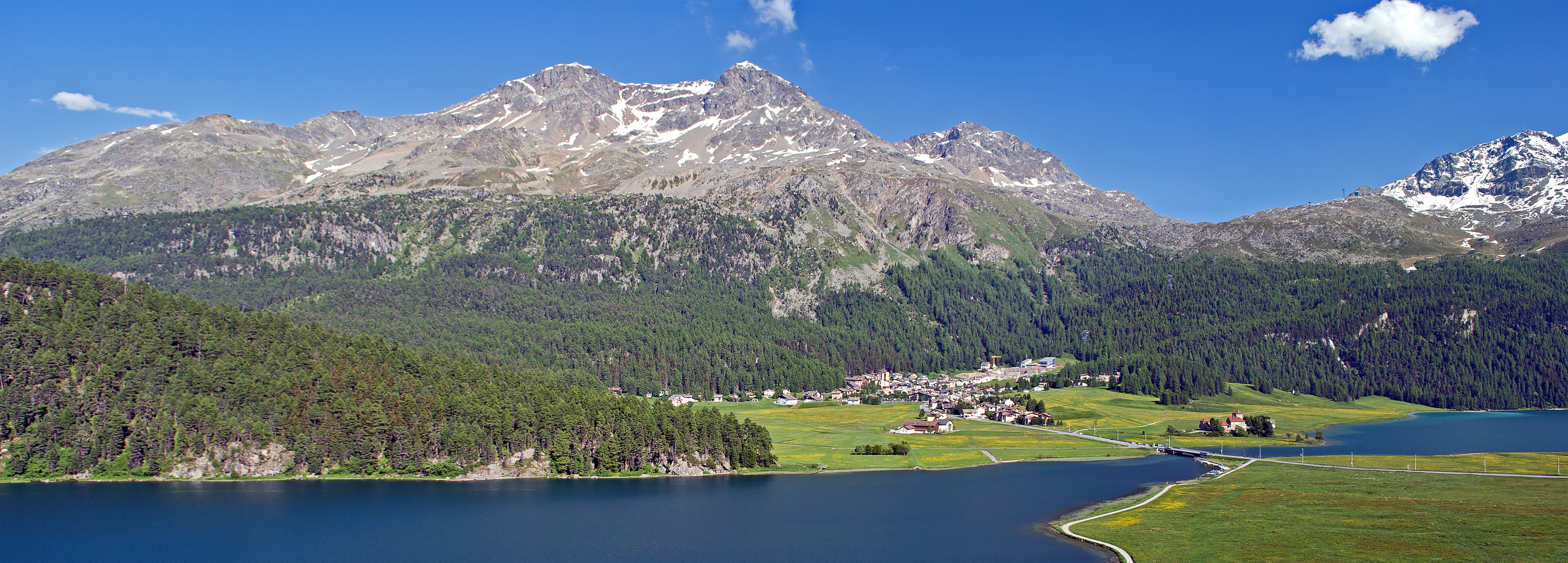

== Sports ==
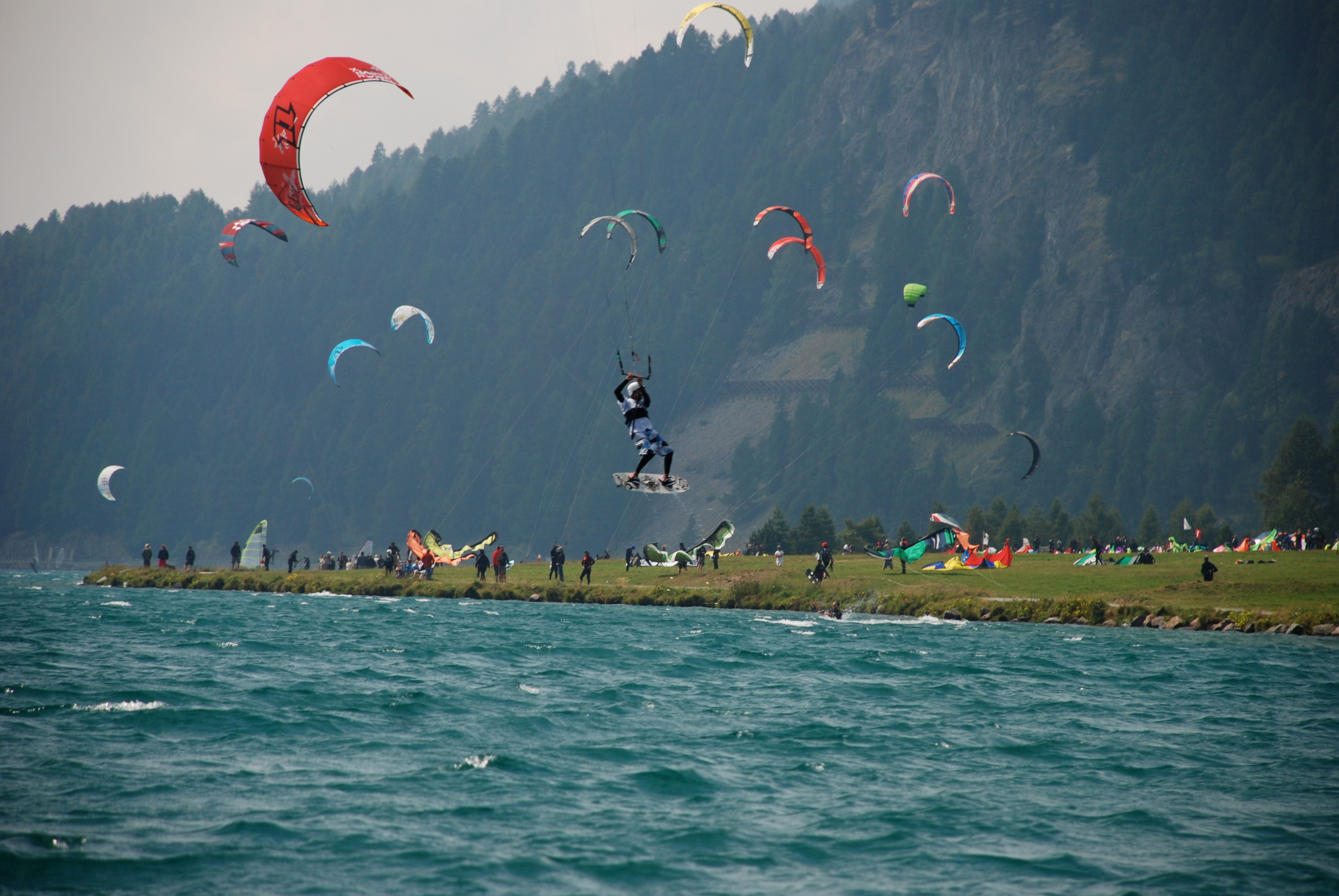
Kitesurfing and kites along Lake Silvaplana

The lake is well known for its predictable winds and is therefore a popular venue for water-sailsports including particularly windsurfing, kitesurfing and dinghy sailing. There is a major watersports centre on the SW shore. An advantage of this location is that spectators are never far from the action, as they might be for more conventional maritime locations.

In August 2007 the International Fireball Dinghy sailing class conducted a World Championship event at Silvaplana; there were 95 boats that competed over 6 races. While there was high local media interest since the 2006 World Champions were a Swiss pair that won in Vancouver, British Columbia, Canada, the 2007 winners were Richard Estaugh and Rob Gardner from Great Britain. The 2006 world champion Swiss team came in 11th in 2007.
