= Lake Sils =

Lake in Grisons, Switzerland

- Silsersee (German); Lej da Segl (Romansh)
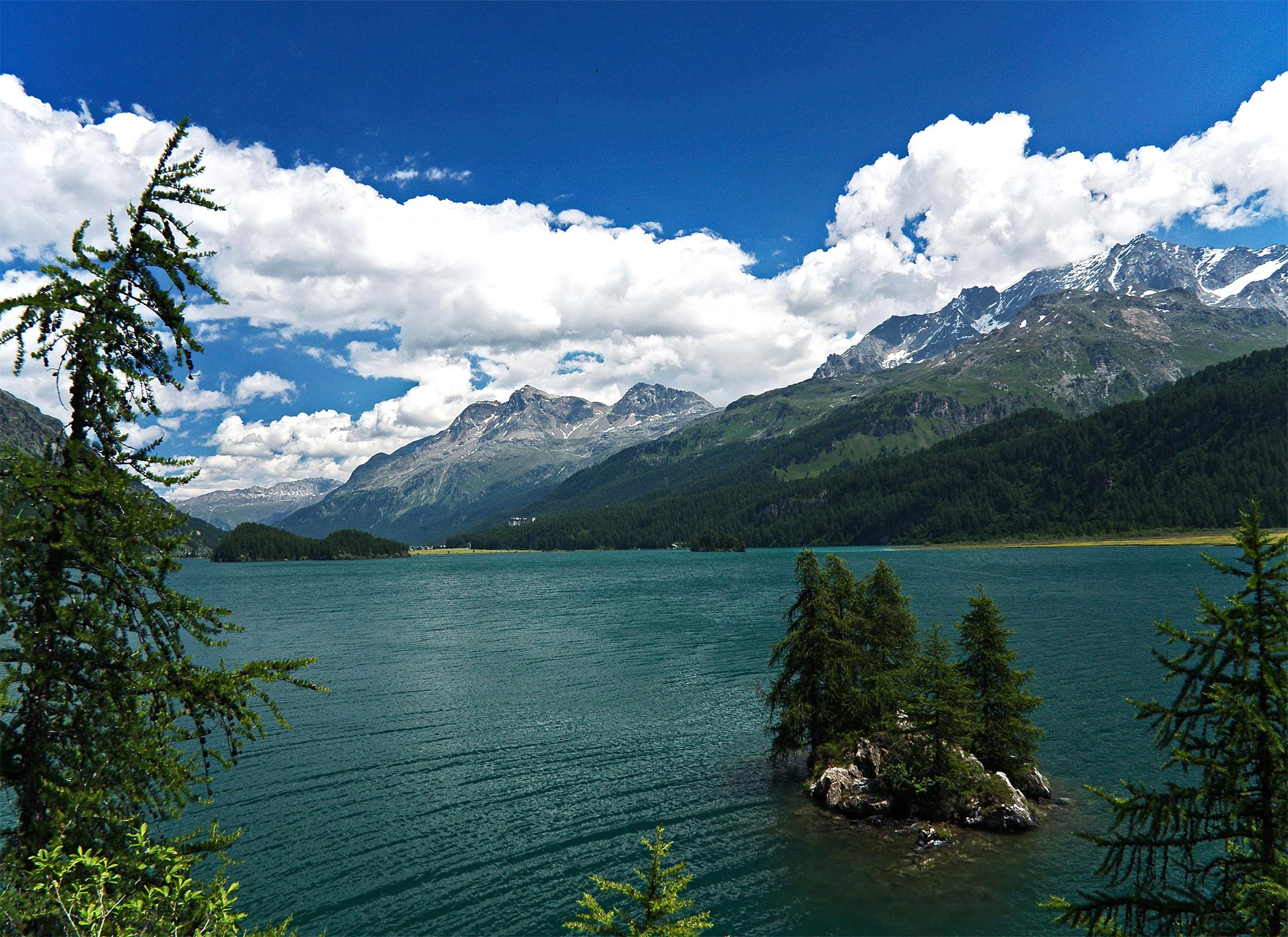
- View from Plaun da Lej towards the Chastè peninsula

- Location within Canton of Graubünden Location within Switzerland Location within Italy Location within Alps
- Interactive map of Lake Sils
- Location: Engadin, Grisons
- Coordinates: 46°25′0″N 9°43′51″E
- Primary inflows: Inn, Aua da Fedoz
- Primary outflows: Inn (named Sela until Lake Silvaplana)
- Basin countries: Switzerland
- Max. length: 5 km (3.1 mi)
- Surface area: 4.1 km^{2} (1.6 sq mi)
- Average depth: 35 m (115 ft)
- Max. depth: 71 m (233 ft)
- Water volume: 137 million cubic metres (111,000 acre⋅ft)
- Residence time: 2.2 years
- Surface elevation: 1,797 m (5,896 ft)
- Islands: Chaviolas (islet)
- Settlements: Sils, Maloja

Lake Sils (German Silsersee, Romansh: Lej da Segl) is a lake in the Upper Engadine valley, Grisons, Switzerland. It takes its name from the village of Sils im Engadin.

== Geography ==
The lake lies at an altitude of 1,797 metres above sea level, between Maloja Pass and Lake Silvaplana. Several mountains over 3,000 metres overlook the lake, notably Piz Corvatsch, Piz Grevasalvas and Piz da la Margna. The lake's drainage basin culminates at Piz Fora (3,336 m) and comprises the Vadrec da Fedoz glacier.

With a surface area of 4.1 km^{2}, Lake Sils is the largest lake of the Engadine. It is also the largest natural lake in the Alps lying above 1,000 metres. The lake was formed by a prehistoric landslide dam, similarly to Lake Silvaplana.

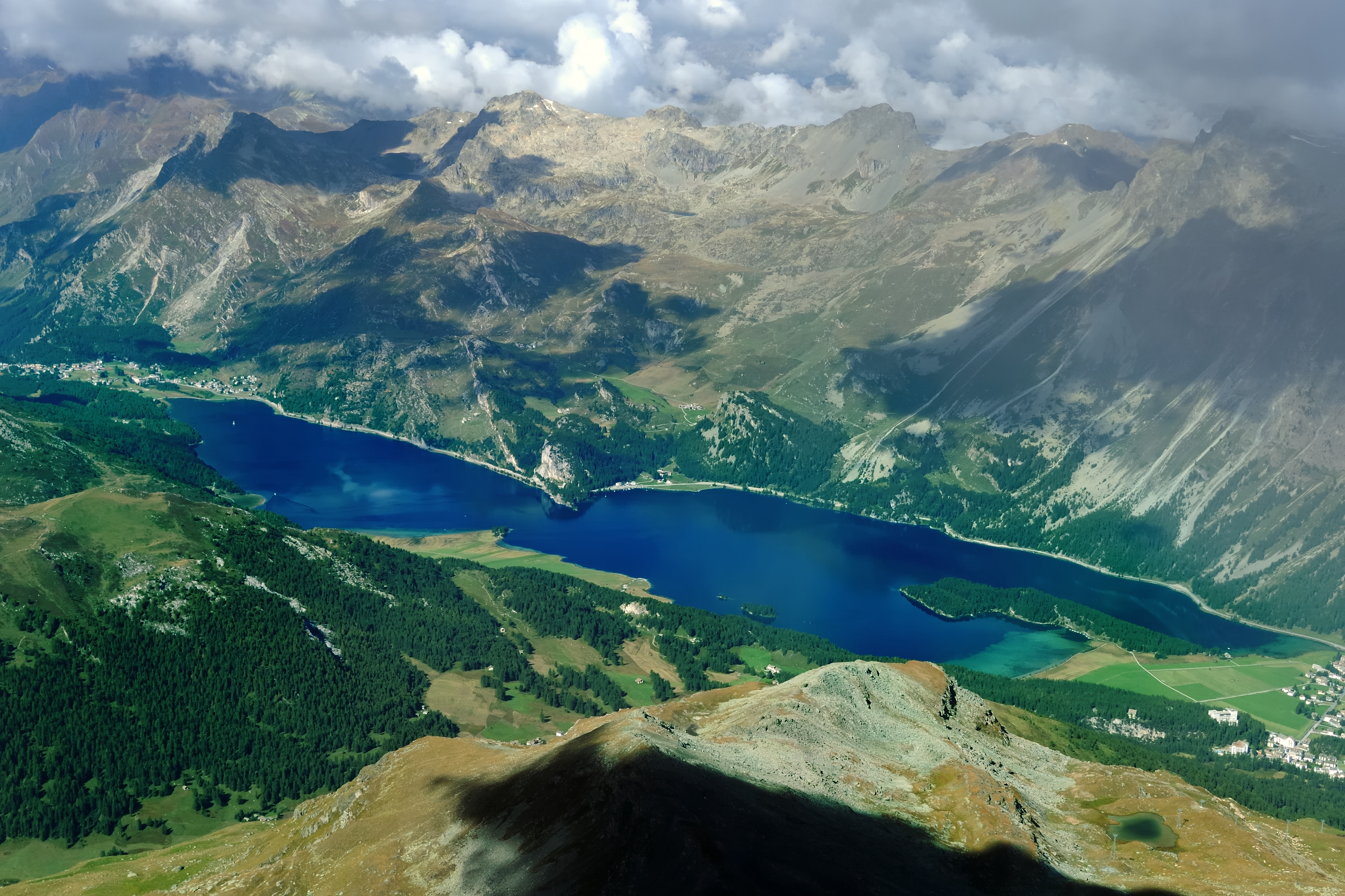
View of Lake Sils from Piz Corvatsch

The wooded Chastè peninsula extends into the lake at its north-eastern end. At the end of the peninsula there is a plaque to Friedrich Nietzsche with a passage from Thus Spoke Zarathustra. Near the peninsula is located the wooded island of Chaviolas, the largest in Lake Sils. Annually, in winter, the cross-country Engadin Skimarathon crosses the lake, starting at its edge in the Maloja Palace.

Boat connections run from end of June to end of September, making Lake Sils one of the highest lake in Europe with public transport boat route.

The largest villages on Lake Sils are Sils im Engadin and Maloja (part of Bregaglia), located respectively at the eastern and western ends of the lake. Other hamlets are Cadlägh, Isola and Plaun da Lej.

== See also ==
- Engadine Line
- List of lakes of Switzerland
- List of mountain lakes of Switzerland
