= Lake Silvaplana =

Lake in Switzerland

- Silvaplanersee (German); Lej da Silvaplauna (Romansh)
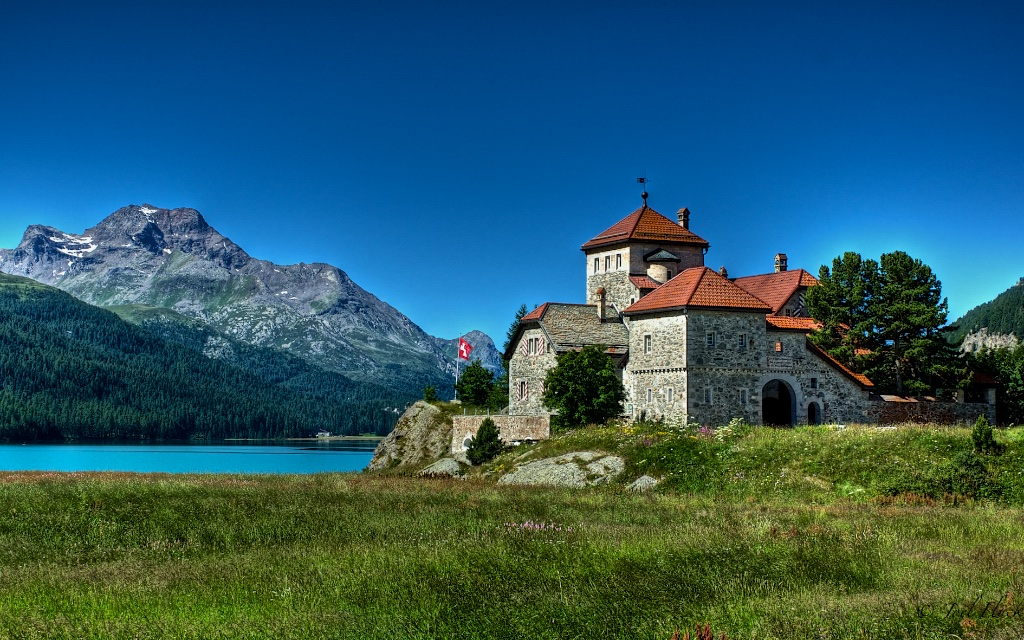
- View from the northern shore

- Location within Canton of Graubünden Location within Switzerland Location within Italy Location within Alps
- Interactive map of Lake Silvaplana
- Location: Engadin, Grisons
- Coordinates: 46°26′56″N 9°47′33″E
- Primary inflows: Inn (named Sela after Lake Sils), Fexbach, Ova dal Valhun
- Primary outflows: Lake Champfèr (Inn)
- Catchment area: 129 km^{2} (50 sq mi)
- Basin countries: Switzerland
- Max. length: 3.1 km (1.9 mi)
- Max. width: 1.4 km (0.87 mi)
- Surface area: 2.7 km^{2} (1.0 sq mi)
- Average depth: 48 m (157 ft)
- Max. depth: 77 m (253 ft)
- Water volume: 0.14 km^{3} (110,000 acre⋅ft)
- Residence time: c. 250 days
- Surface elevation: 1,790.54 m (5,874.5 ft)
- Settlements: Sils Maria, Silvaplana

Lake Silvaplana (German: Silvaplanersee; Romansh: Lej da Silvaplauna) is a lake in the Upper-Engadine valley of Grisons, Switzerland. It takes its name from the village of Silvaplana. The lake is also connected to the nearby Lej da Champfèr. Together with its larger neighbour, Lake Sils, it is among the largest lakes of the Grisons. Lake Silvaplana is overlooked by several mountains over 3,000 metres, notably Piz Corvatsch, Piz Julier and Piz Surlej. The lake's drainage basin culminates at Piz Corvatsch (3,451 m) and comprises several glaciers, the largest being the Vadret dal Tremoggia.

A campsite is located on the northern end of the lake. The lake is also used heavily for sports, such as kitesurfing and windsurfing in the summertime. In the winter, once the lake freezes, it is used for cross country skiing, walking trails, and kitesurfing on snow, with the famous Engadin Skimarathon crossing the lake annually. The rare occasion of black ice also brings ice skaters to the lake.

In Ecce Homo, Friedrich Nietzsche recounts the moment he first conceived his idea of the Eternal Recurrence while walking through the woods beside Lake Silvaplana in August 1881.

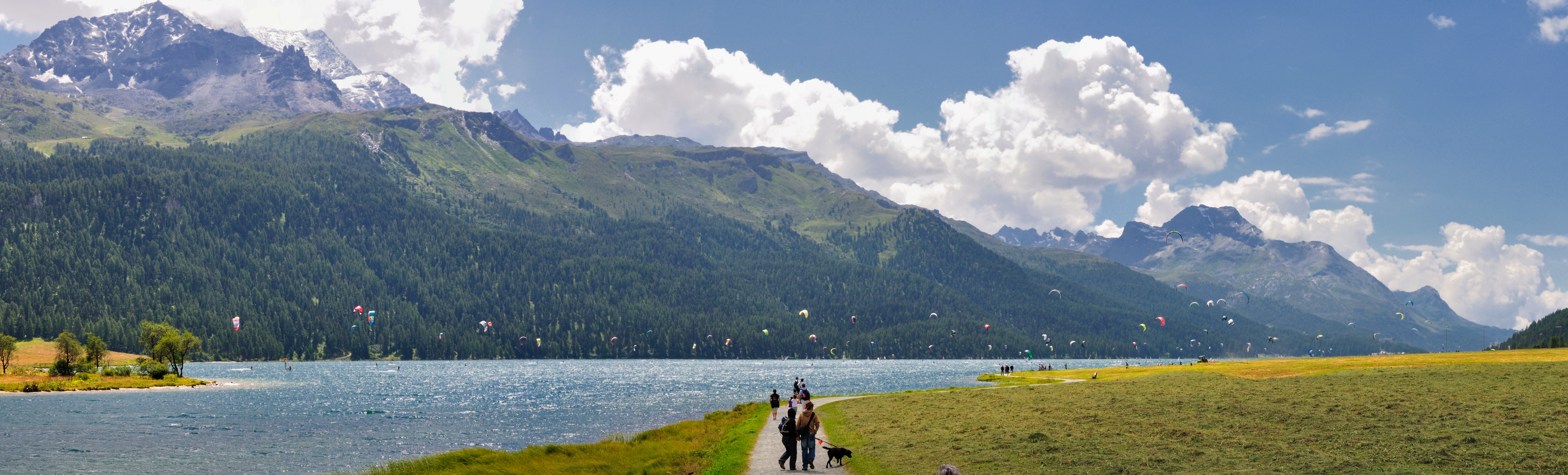
View from Silvaplana towards Piz Corvatsch (left) and Piz da la Margna (right)

== See also ==
- Engadine Line
- List of lakes of Switzerland
- List of mountain lakes of Switzerland
