= Piz da la Margna =

Mountain in Switzerland

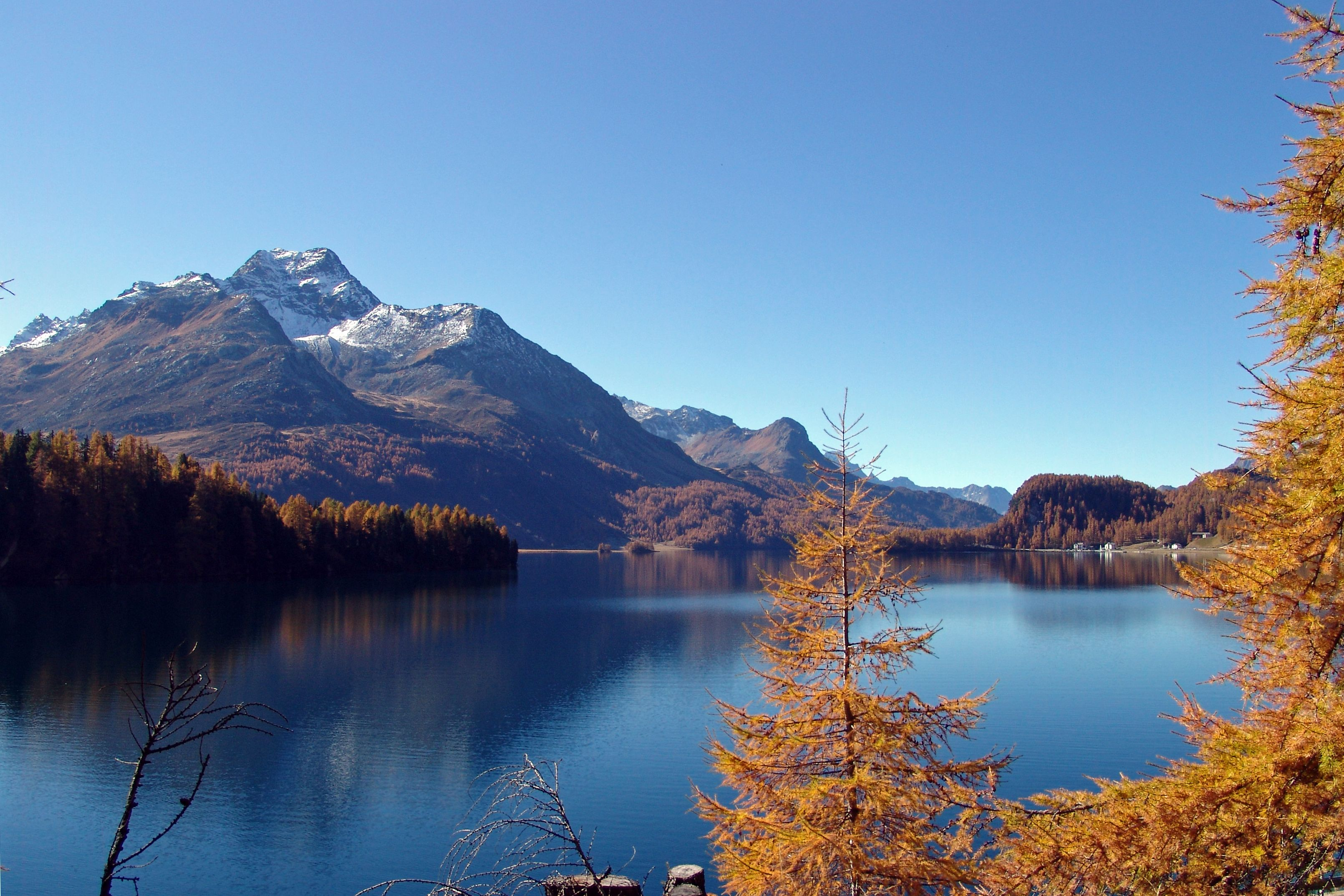
- Piz da la Margna (left) and Lake Sils

Highest point
- Elevation: 3,159 m (10,364 ft)
- Prominence: 273 m (896 ft)
- Parent peak: Piz Bernina
- Coordinates: 46°22′55″N 9°43′48″E

Geography
- Location within Switzerland
- Location: Graubünden, Switzerland
- Parent range: Bernina Range

Climbing
- First ascent: June 1857 by J. Caviezel, Krättli, Robbi and Zaun
- Easiest route: East flank (F)

Piz da la Margna (3,158 m) is a mountain in the Bernina Range of the Alps, overlooking Lake Sils in the Swiss canton of Graubünden. It lies to the south-east of the Maloja Pass at the south-western end of the Engadin valley.

Ascents can be made from Maloja via the north ridge (F); a slightly easier route is via the Val Fedoz and the east flank. The south-east ridge from the Fuorcla da la Margna (AD, IV) was first climbed by Hans Frick, Christian Zippert and Hans Casper on 14 August 1918.

The first recorded ‘tourist’ ascent of the mountain was made by J. Caviezel, Krättli, Robbi and Zaun in June 1857.
