= Samedan Airport =

Samedan Airport Flughafen Engadin
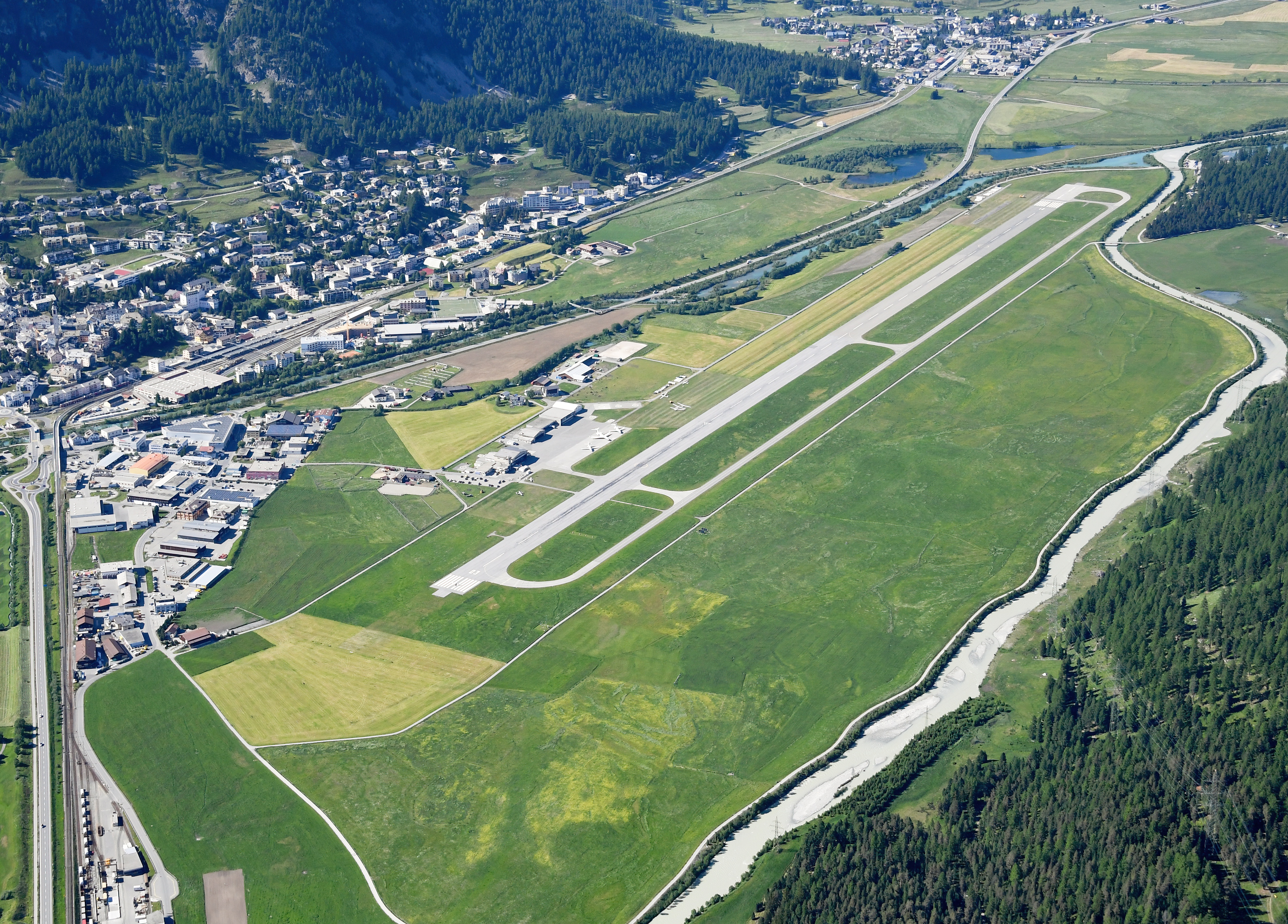
- IATA: SMV; ICAO: LSZS

Summary
- Airport type: Public and military
- Owner: Engadin Airport AG
- Operator: Engadin Airport AG
- Serves: St. Moritz, Switzerland
- Location: Samedan
- Elevation AMSL: 1,707 m (5,600 ft)
- Coordinates: 46°32′02″N 009°53′02″E
- Website: engadin-airport.ch
- Interactive map of Samedan Airport

Runways
| Direction | Length | | Surface |
| Direction | m | ft | Surface |
|---|---|---|---|
| 03/21 | 1,800 | 5,905 | Asphalt |

Statistics (2022)
- Movements: 15,923
- Sources: airport web site Statistic from Engadin Airport AG.

Samedan Airport (Note: German: Flughafen Samedan, French: Aéroport de Samedan, Italian: Aeroporto di Samedan) (IATA: SMV, ICAO: LSZS), also known as Engadin Airport, (Note: German: Flughafen Engadin, French: Aéroport d'Engadin, Italian: Aeroporto d'Engadina, Romansh: Eroport da l'Engiadina) is a regional airport in Samedan in the Engadin valley of Switzerland, 5 km from St. Moritz.

== History ==
At the end of World War II, Swiss authorities identified existing locations that were to be modernized with new regional airports, as second tiers of infrastructure to support the primary urban airports, with Samedan being one of the five.

On 17 August 2025, there was a referendum about the question if the 11 municipalities of the Upper Engadine are contributing 38 million of an 68.5 million Swiss francs investment to modernize the airport. The other 30.5 mio SFR are coming from the federal government and the canton Grisons. Rega is also building a new base at its own expense as part of the expansion. 2,443 Upper Engadine residents (54.36 per cent of participants) voted yes and 2,051 voted no. Voter turnout was 45.64 per cent.

== Facilities ==
The airport has one runway designated 03/21 with an asphalt pavement measuring 1800 x 40 metres (5905 x 130 ft). Because of its location at the bottom of a valley, it is not equipped with an instrument landing system.

== Operations ==
At an elevation of 1,707 metres (5,600 ft), it is the second highest airliner airport in Europe (with Courchevel being the highest). It is also considered one of the most challenging airports in the world because of its difficult topography and winds, and because of the thinness of the air (especially in summer) at its altitude. The airport does not have any scheduled passenger flights (the nearest such airports are Lugano, 185 km/115 mi Milan Malpensa Airport northwest of Milan, 180km/112mi, and Zürich Airport, 220 km/135 mi distance by road). Much of its traffic consists of light to heavy general aviation traffic, including many private-corporate jets and private propeller aircraft.

== Accidents and incidents ==
On 17 March 2025, an Extra EA-400 propeller aircraft heading for Roskilde, Denmark crashed two minutes after takeoff from the airport at the outskirts of the village of La Punt Chamues-ch, killing all three people on board.

== See also ==
- Transport in Switzerland
- List of airports in Switzerland
