= Pierrefeu-du-Var =

- Commune
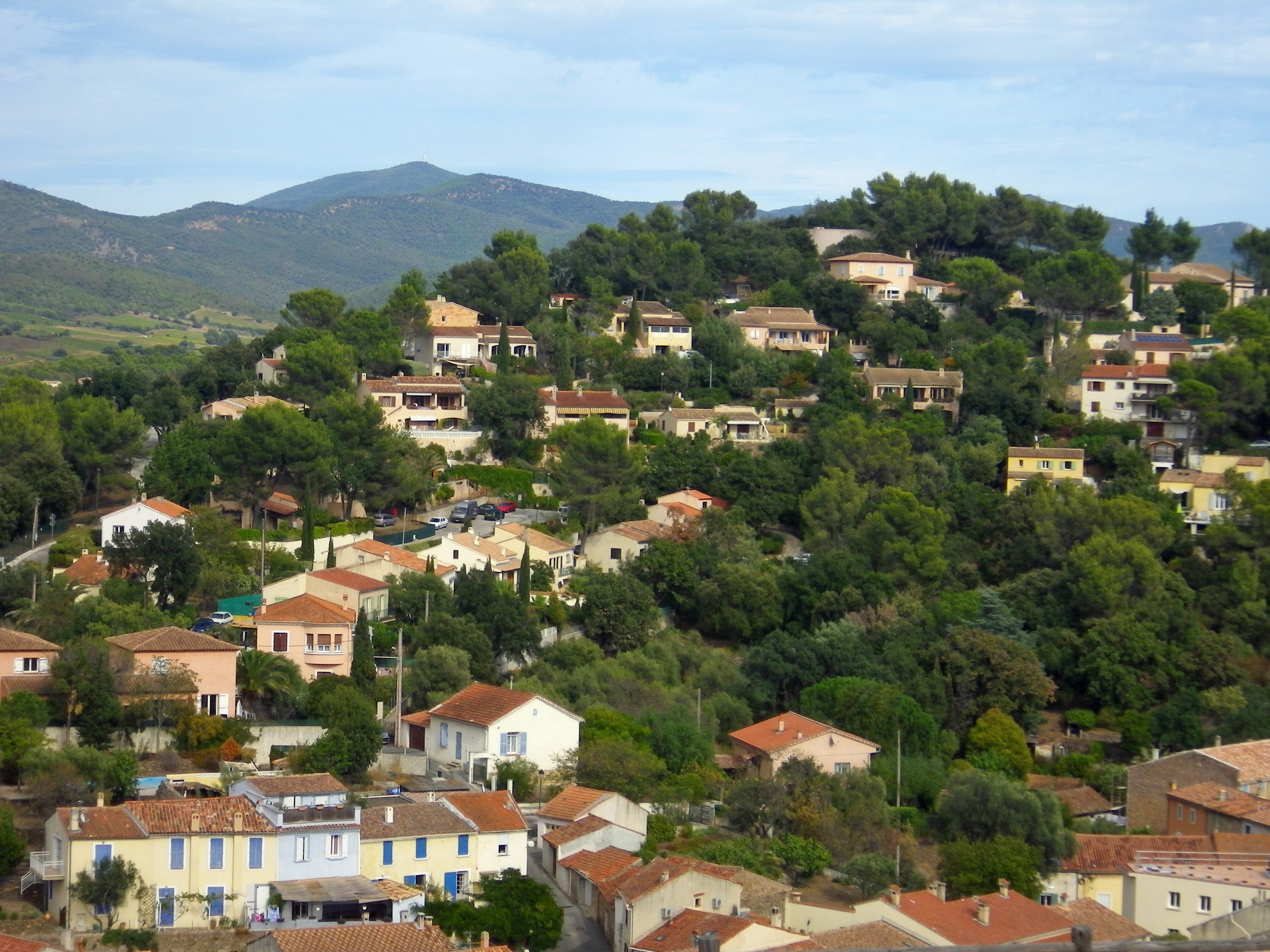
- A view towards the north, of Pierrefeu-du-Var

- Coat of arms
- Location of Pierrefeu-du-Var
- Location within France Location within Provence-Alpes-Côte d'Azur
- Coordinates: 43°13′37″N 6°08′35″E
- Country: France
- Region: Provence-Alpes-Côte d'Azur
- Department: Var
- Arrondissement: Toulon
- Canton: Garéoult

Government
  - Mayor (2020–2026): Patrick Martinelli
- Area^{1}: 58.36 km^{2} (22.53 sq mi)
- Highest elevation: 442 m (1,450 ft)
- Lowest elevation: 45 m (148 ft)
- Population (2023): 6,084
  - Density: 104.2/km^{2} (270.0/sq mi)
- Time zone: UTC+01:00 (CET)
  - Summer (DST): UTC+02:00 (CEST)
- INSEE/Postal code: 83091 /83390
- ^{1} French Land Register data, which excludes lakes, ponds, glaciers > 1 km^{2} (0.386 sq mi or 247 acres) and river estuaries.

Pierrefeu-du-Var (French pronunciation: [pjɛʁfø dy vaʁ]; (Old Provençal: Peire-Fue;Old Provençal pronunciation: [Pɛjʁɛfɛ]) is a commune in the Var department in the Provence-Alpes-Côte d'Azur region in southeastern France.

It has an aerodrome, Cuers-Pierrefeu Aerodrome, shared with nearby Cuers.

== Population ==
Historical population
Year	Pop.	±% p.a.
1968	3,951	—
1975	3,872	−0.29%
1982	3,983	+0.40%
1990	4,040	+0.18%
1999	4,348	+0.82%
2007	5,084	+1.97%
2012	5,867	+2.91%
2017	6,045	+0.60%
2023	6,084	+0.11%
Source: INSEE

== See also ==
- Communes of the Var department
