= Samedan =

- Municipality
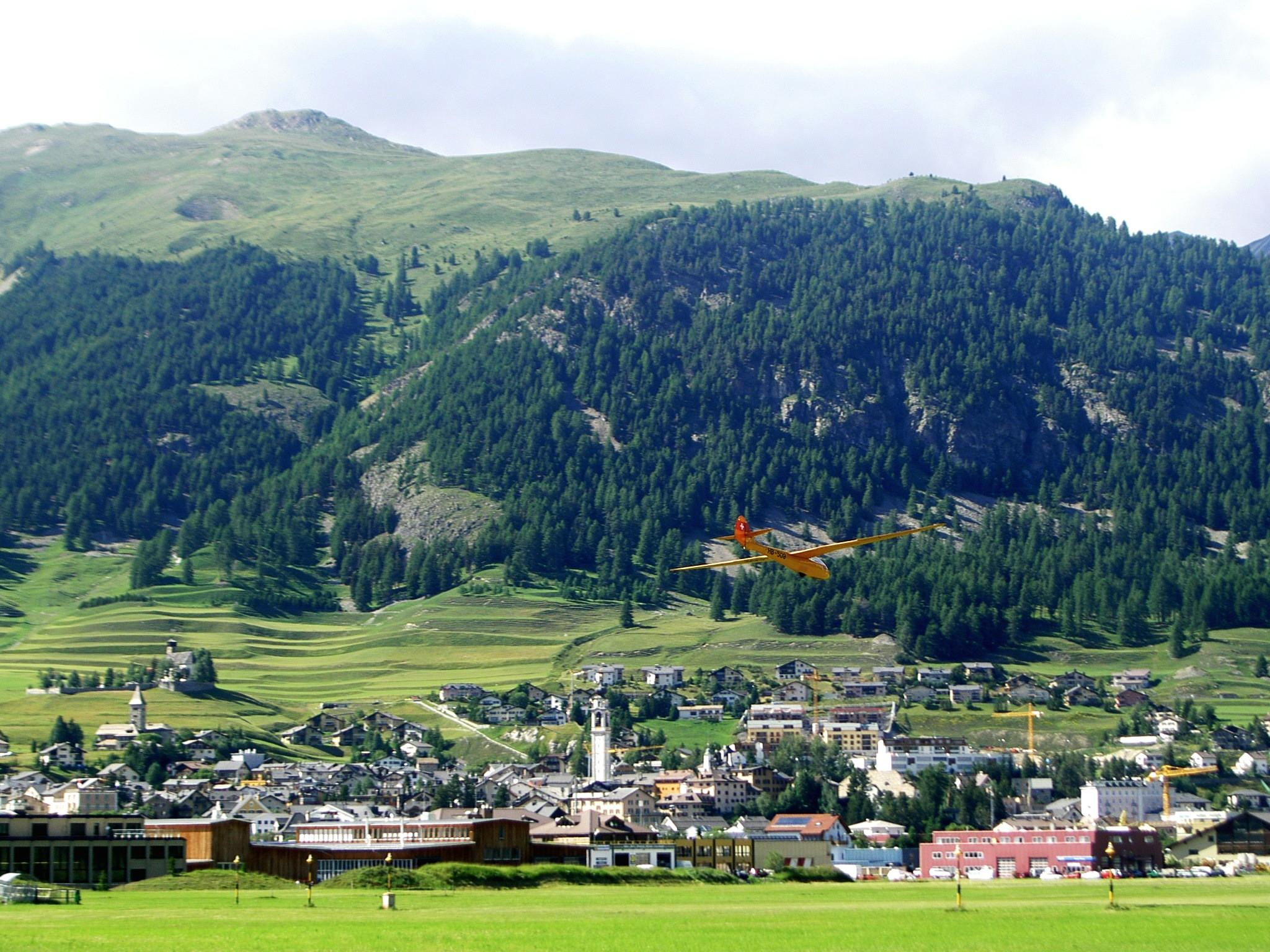

- Flag Coat of arms
- Location of Samedan
- Location within Switzerland Location within Canton of Grisons
- Coordinates: 46°32′N 9°52′E
- Country: Switzerland
- Canton: Grisons
- District: Maloja

Government
  - Mayor: Gemeindepräsident; Jon Fadri Huder (as of 2008)

Area
  - Total: 113.97 km^{2} (44.00 sq mi)
- Elevation: 1,721 m (5,646 ft)

Population (December 2020)
  - Total: 2,923
  - Density: 25.65/km^{2} (66.43/sq mi)
- Time zone: UTC+01:00 (CET)
  - Summer (DST): UTC+02:00 (CEST)
- Postal code: 7503
- SFOS number: 3786
- ISO 3166 code: CH-GR
- Surrounded by: Bergün/Bravuogn, Bever, Celerina/Schlarigna, Lanzada (IT-SO), La Punt Chamues-ch, Pontresina, Sankt-Moritz, Sils im Engadin/Segl, Silvaplana
- Twin towns: Le Mont-sur-Lausanne (Switzerland)
- Website: www.samedan.ch

Samedan (Romansh pronunciation: [sɐˈmeːdən], locally [saˈmedən]) is a town and municipality in the Maloja Region in the Swiss canton of Grisons. It is served by Samedan railway station on the Albula line on the Rhaetian Railway network and by the Samedan Airport.

== History ==
Samedan is first mentioned in 1139 as Samaden. In 1334 it was mentioned as Semeden, in 1367 as Semaden, in 1498 as Sumada and in 1527 as Sameden. Samedan is the location of The Smallest Whiskey Bar on Earth, the establishment holding the Guinness World Records distinction of "Smallest Permanently Licensed Bar in the World."

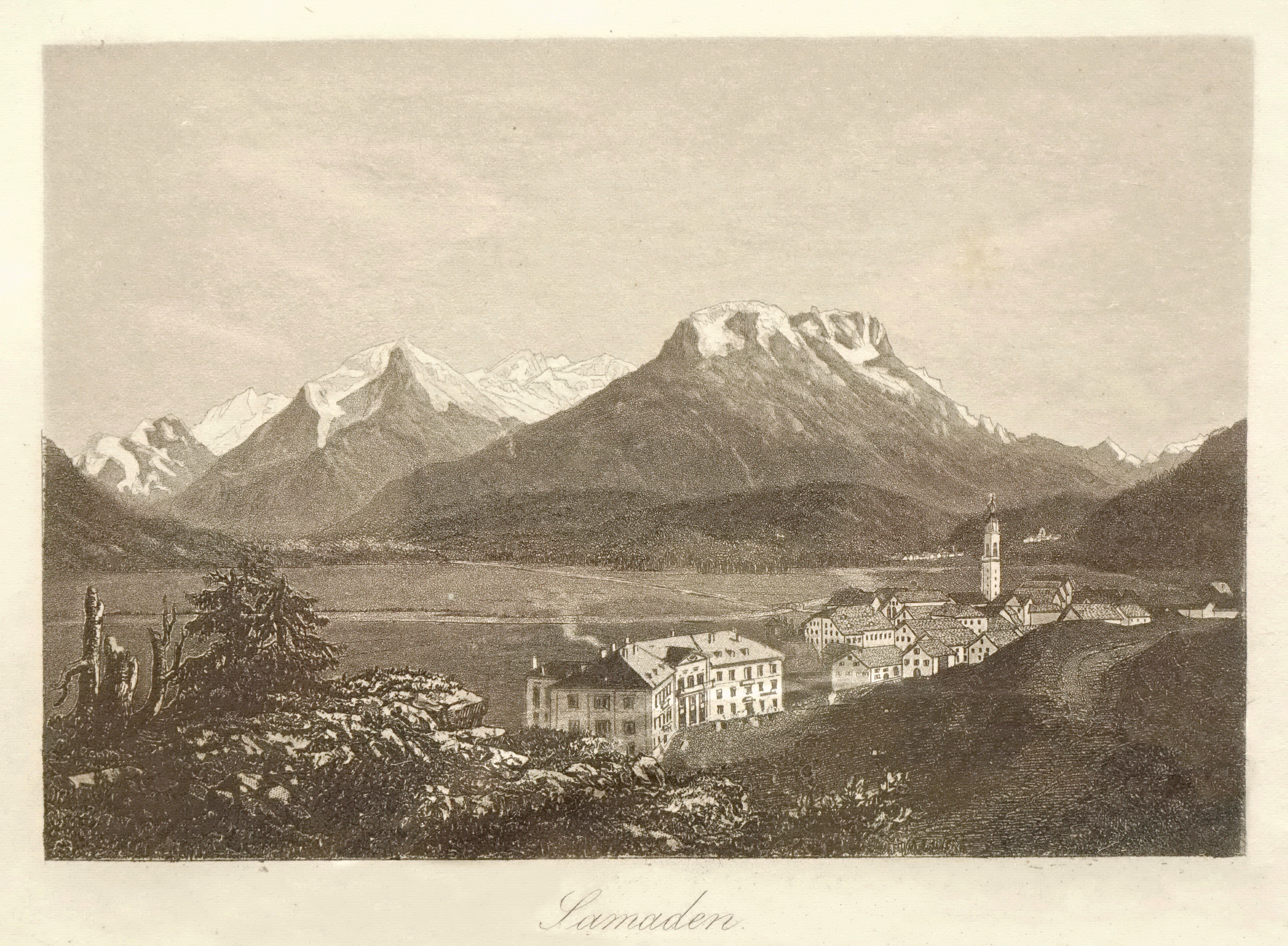
Samedan c. 1870 with the Bernina hotel (opened in 1865), one of the oldest hotels in the Engadin. Etching by Heinrich Müller

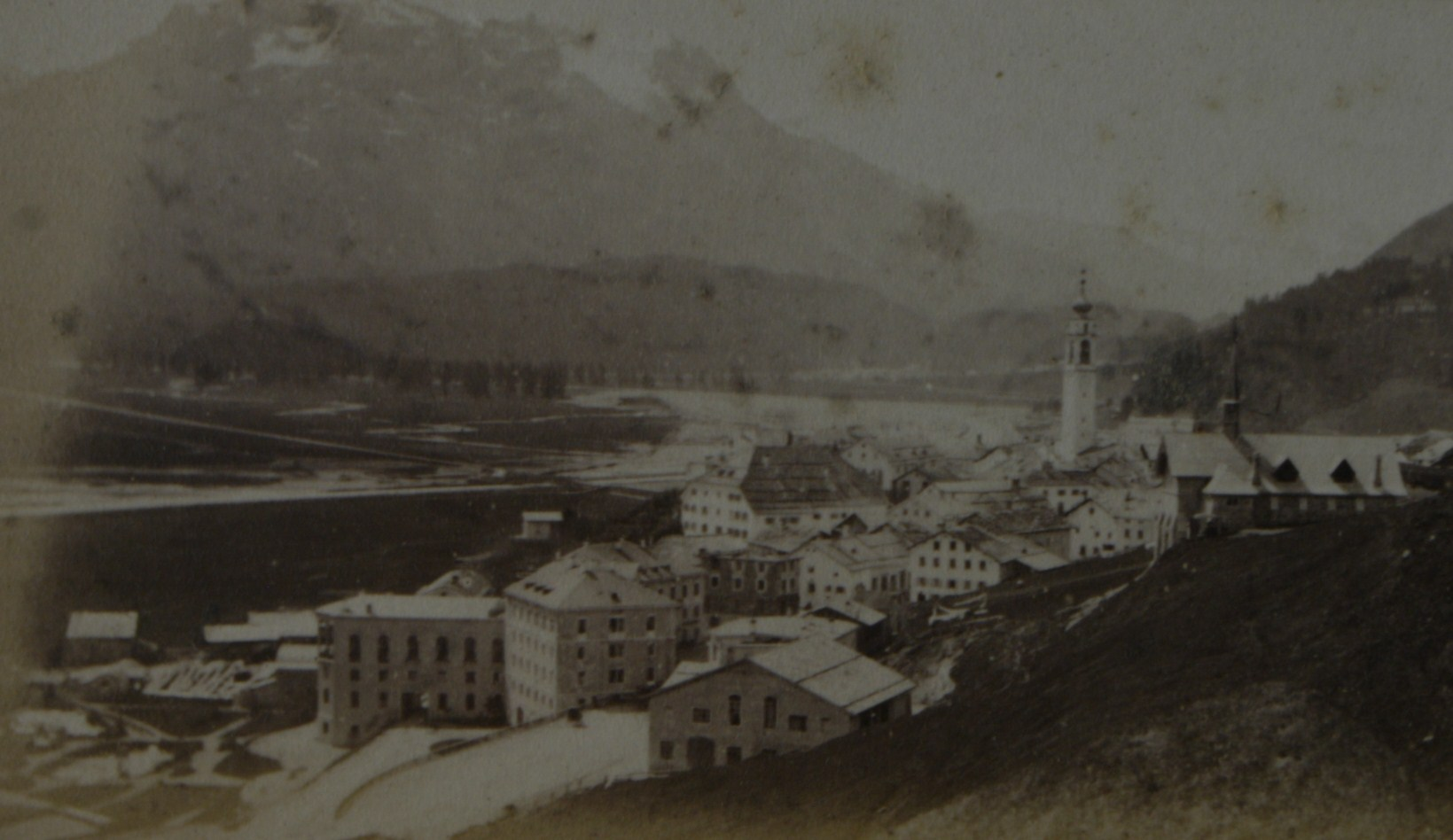
A photograph of Samedan in the circa 1870s

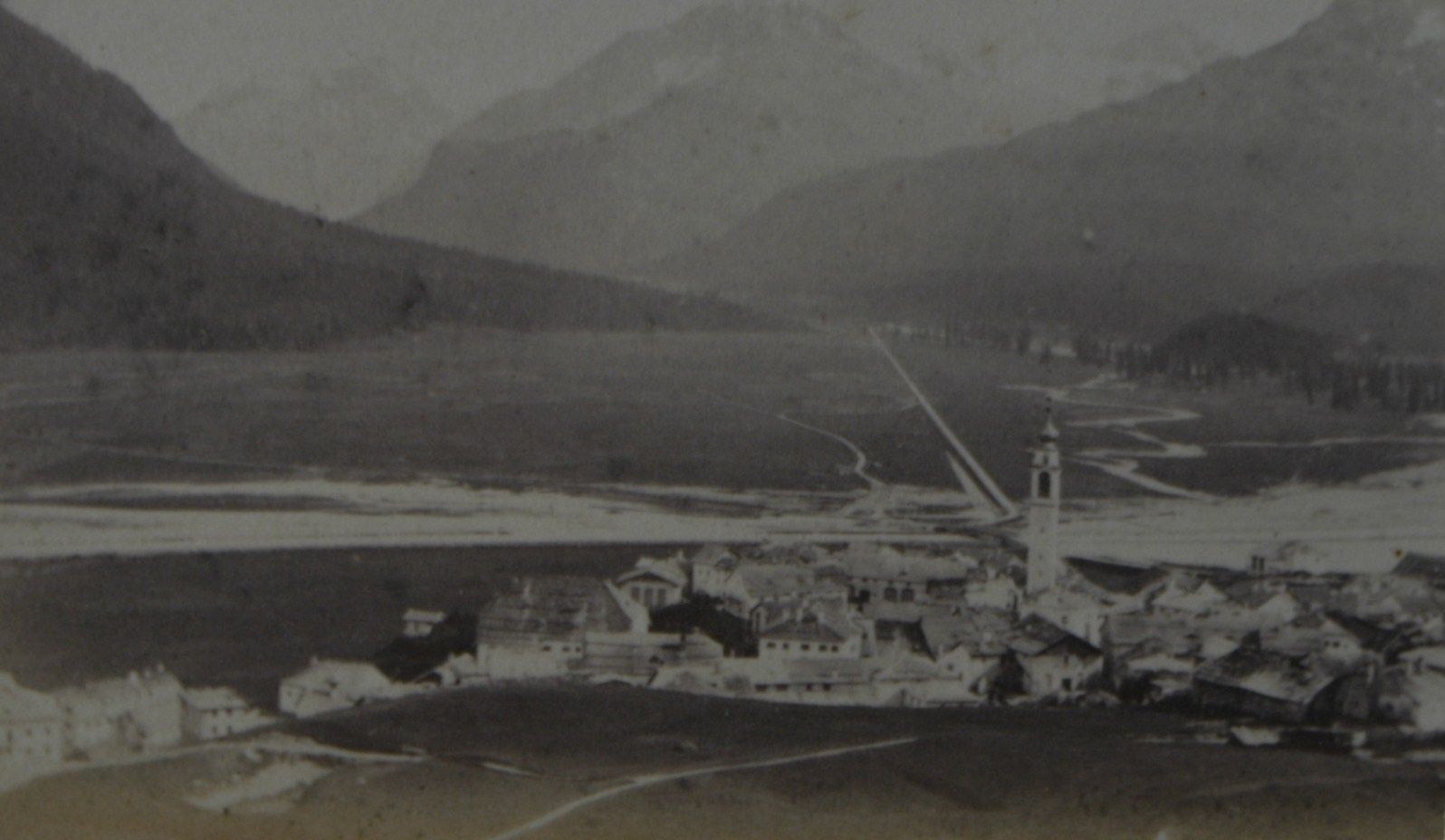
Another photographic view of Samedan in the circa 1870s

Aerial view (1954)

== Geography ==
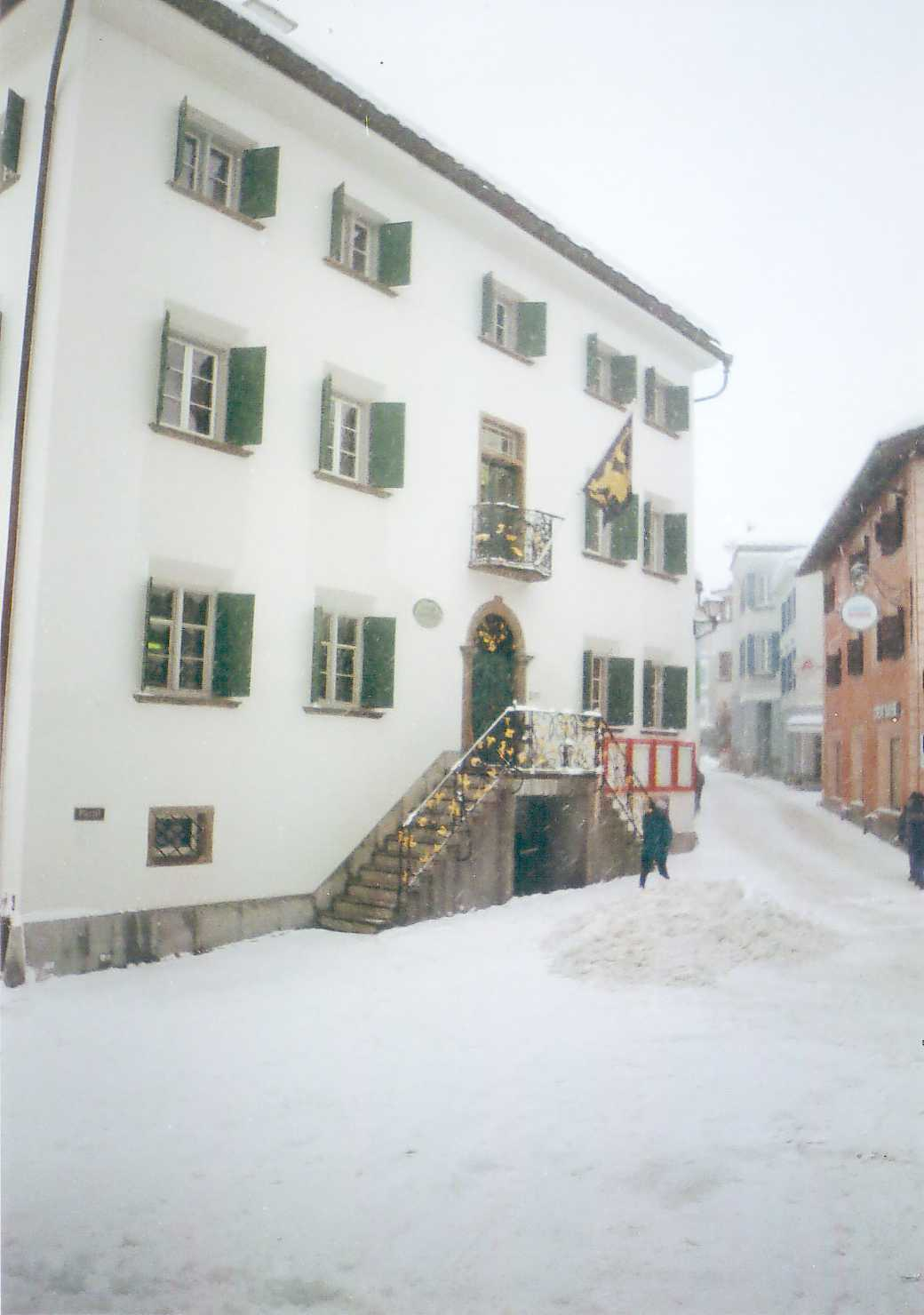
Samedan town hall in winter

Samedan has an area, (as of the 2004/09 survey) of 113.8 km^{2} (43.94 sq mi). Of this area, about 15.5% is used for agricultural purposes, while 9.7% is forested. Of the rest of the land, 1.9% is settled (buildings or roads) and 72.9% is unproductive land. Over the past two decades (1979/85-2004/09) the amount of land that is settled has increased by 34 ha (84 acres) and the agricultural land has decreased by 120 ha (300 acres).

Before 2017, the municipality was located in the Oberengadin sub-district of the Maloja district in the central Oberengadin valley along the Inn river. After 2017 it was part of the Maloja Region. It consists of the village of Samedan and the hamlet of Punt Muragl, the upper section of the Val Bever as well as an exclave that includes nearly the entire Val Roseg, a valley surrounded by the highest mountains of the canton: Piz Bernina, Piz Scerscen and Piz Roseg. Until 1943 Samedan was known as Samaden.

== Demographics ==
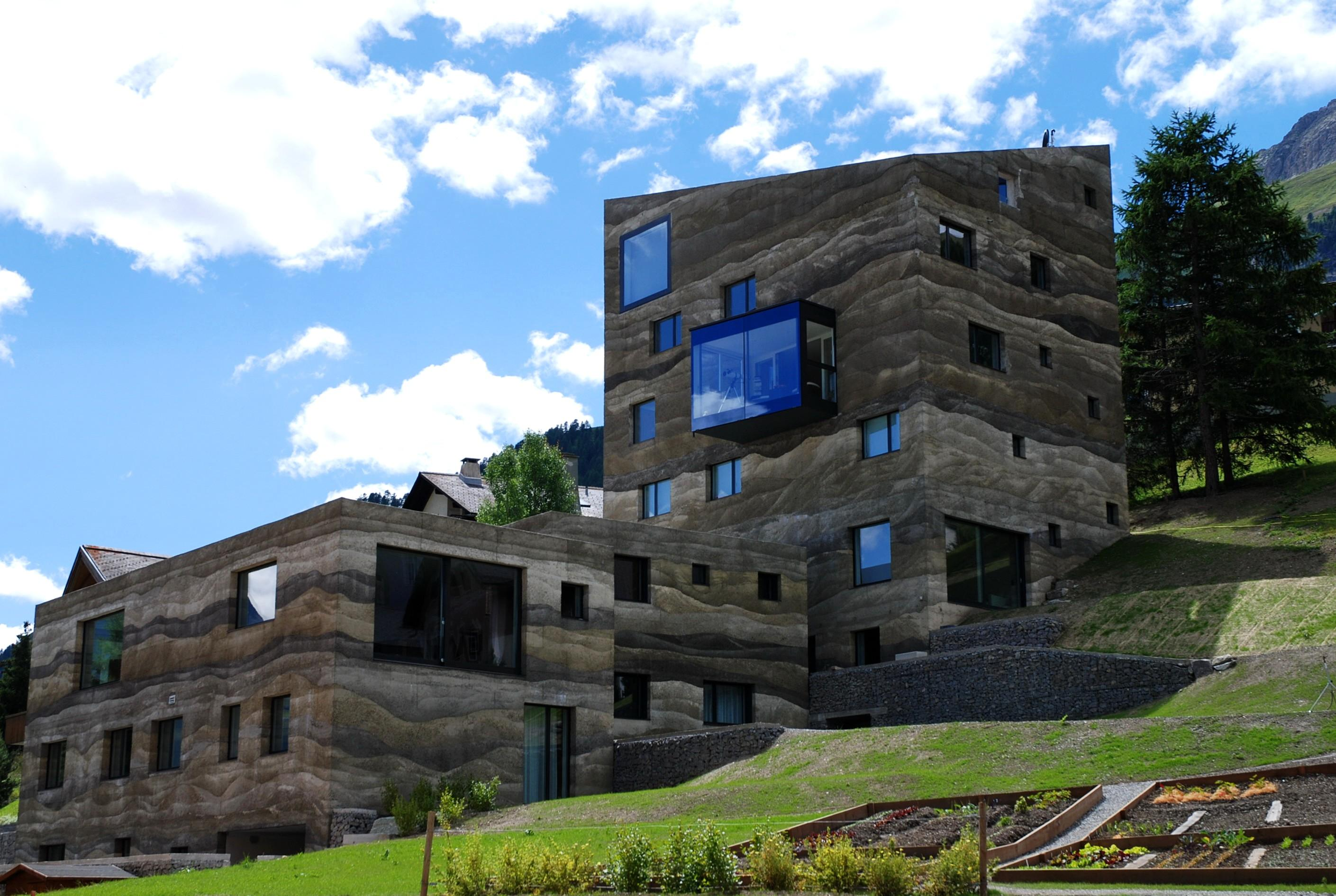
Modern houses in Samedan

Samedan has a population (as of December 2020) of 2,923. As of 2013, 23.6% of the population are resident foreign nationals. Over the last 3 years (2010–2013) the population has changed at a rate of 1.31%. The birth rate in the municipality, in 2013, was 8.3 while the death rate was 7.0 per thousand residents.

As of 2013, children and teenagers (0–19 years old) make up 18.1% of the population, while adults (20–64 years old) are 64.6% and seniors (over 64 years old) make up 17.3%.

In 2013 there were 1,423 private households in Samedan. Of the 489 inhabited buildings in the municipality, in 2000, about 21.9% were single family homes and 47.6% were multiple family buildings. Additionally, about 22.5% of the buildings were built before 1919, while 9.4% were built between 1991 and 2000. In 2012 the rate of construction of new housing units per 1000 residents was 31.86. The vacancy rate for the municipality, in 2014, was 2.14%.

== Historic population ==
The historical population is given in the following chart:

== Languages ==
Most of the population (as of 2000) speaks German (61.5%), with Romansh being second most common (16.7%) and Italian being third (14.9%). Originally, the entire population spoke the Upper-Engadin Romansh dialect of Putèr. Due to increasing trade with the outside world, Romansh usage began to decline in the 19th century. In 1880, only 47% spoke Romansh as a first language, while in 1910, it was 45% and in 1941, it was 42%. The Romansh-speaking percentage dropped until, in 1970, only 31% spoke it as their first language. In the 1980s, Romansh speakers increased slightly, but since then, the proportion has decreased. However, in 2000, there were 42% who understood Romansh even if it was not their first language.

Languages of Samedan
Languages	Census 1970		Census 1980		Census 1990		Census 2000	
Languages	Number	Percent	Number	Percent	Number	Percent	Number	Percent
German	1,096	42.6%	1,140	44.7%	1,567	54.5%	1,886	61.5%
Romansh	791	30.7%	841	32.9%	649	22.6%	511	16.7%
Italian	561	21.8%	451	17.7%	476	16.6%	458	14.9%
TOTAL	2,574	100%	2,553	100%	2,875	100%	3,069	100%

== Politics ==
In the 2015 federal election the most popular party was the SVP with 23.8% of the vote. The next three most popular parties were the FDP (22.5%), the BDP (19.6%) and the SP (16.4%). In the federal election, a total of 821 votes were cast, and the voter turnout was 42.3%.

In the 2007 federal election the most popular party was the SP which received 30.6% of the vote. The next three most popular parties were the SVP (28.7%), the FDP (28.2%) and the CVP (10.4%).

== Education ==
In Samedan about 75.7% of the population (between age 25–64) have completed either non-mandatory upper secondary education or additional higher education (either university or a Fachhochschule).

== Transportation ==
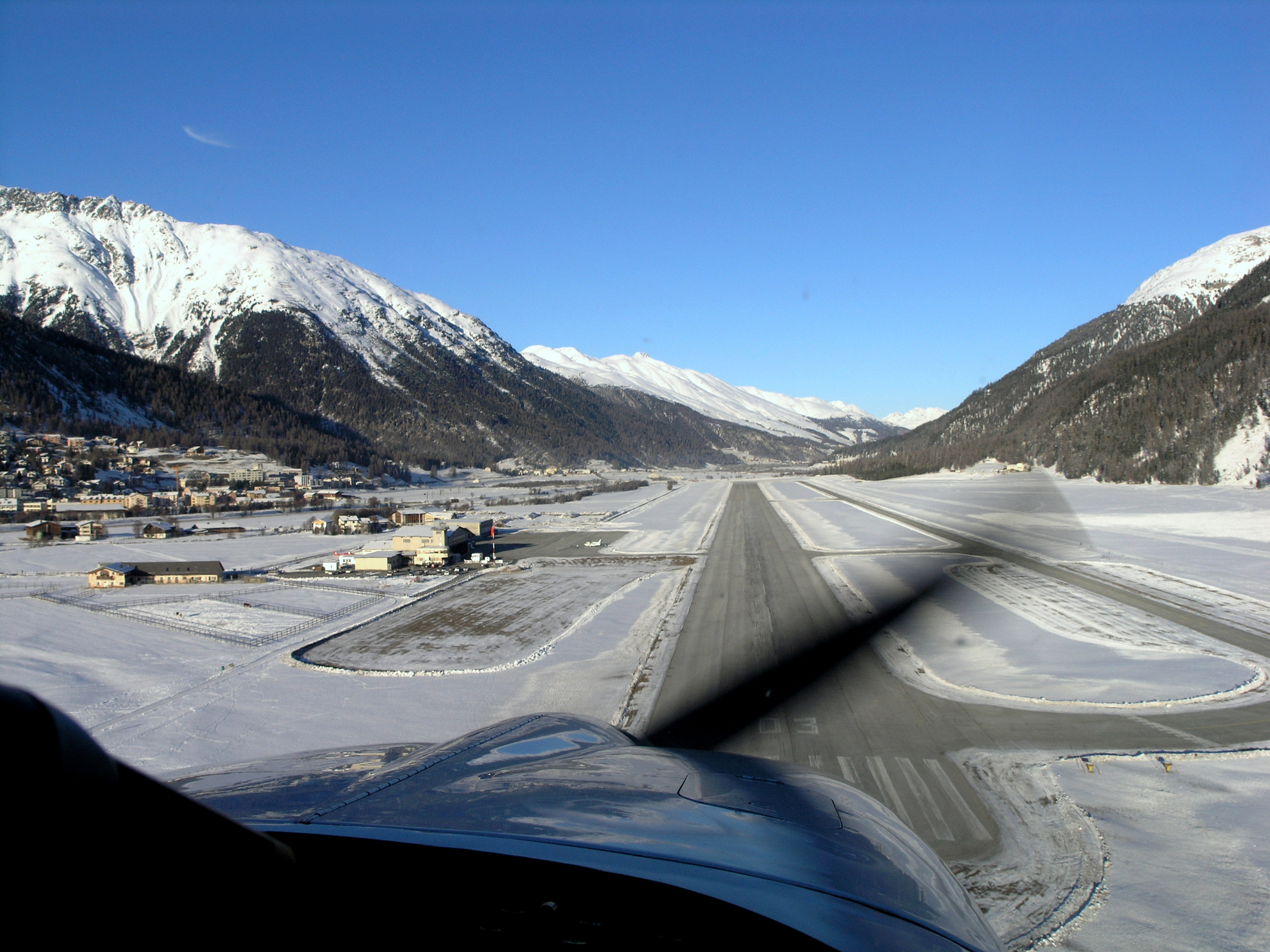
The airport in Samedan

It is the administrative center of the upper Engadin region, and services include a regional hospital (Spital Oberengadin), a major RhB railway station with regular trains towards Pontresina, Chur and St. Moritz, and a regional airport (Engadin Airport). Both the Bernina Express and Glacier Express trains pass Samedan.

== Economy ==
As of 2012, there were a total of 2,891 people employed in the municipality. Of these, a total of 26 people worked in 8 businesses in the primary economic sector. The secondary sector employed 500 workers in 51 separate businesses. Finally, the tertiary sector provided 2,365 jobs in 335 businesses. In 2013 a total of 31.9% of the population received social assistance.

== Heritage sites of national significance ==
The Catholic Church of the Sacred Heart and the Library of Fundaziun de Planta are listed as Swiss heritage sites of national significance.

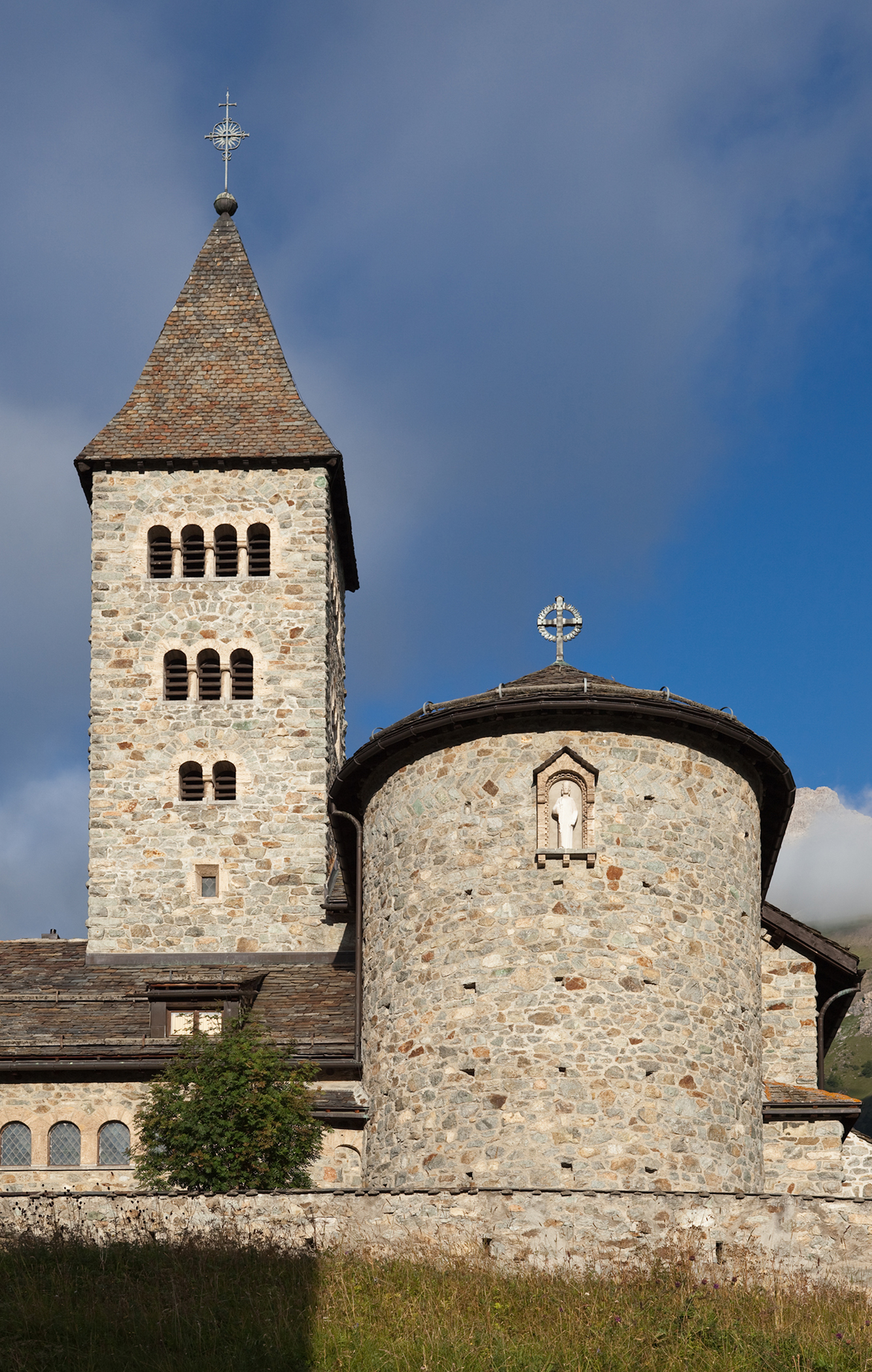
Church of the Sacred Heart

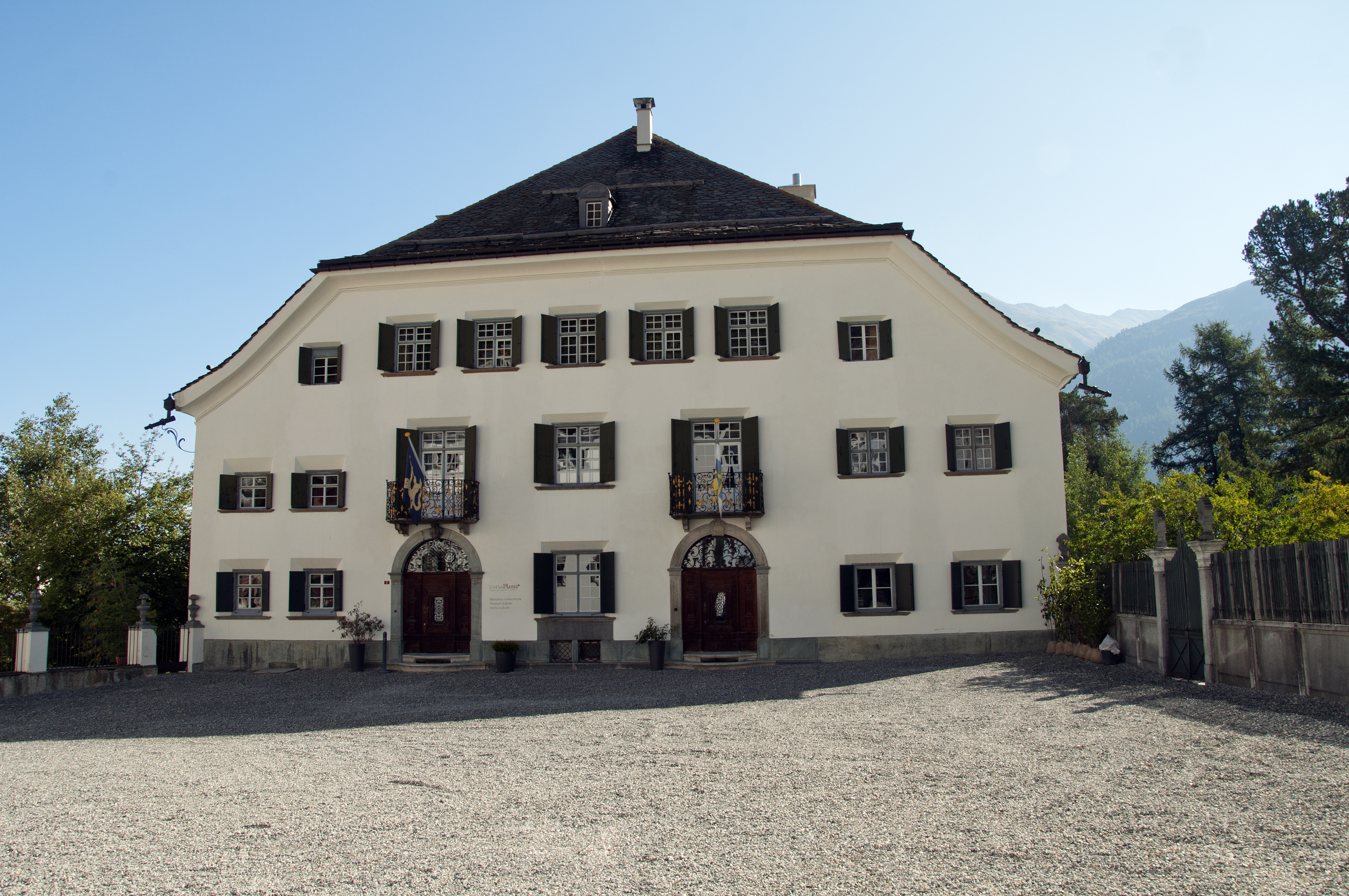
Biblioteca da la Fundaziun de Planta

== Climate ==
Köppen-Geiger climate classification classifies its climate as subarctic (Dfc). Between 1961 and 1990 Samedan had an average of 95.5 days of rain per year and on average received 700 mm (28 in) of precipitation. The wettest month was August during which time Samedan received an average of 99 mm (3.9 in) of precipitation. During this month there was precipitation for an average of 11.5 days. The driest month of the year was February with an average of 25 mm (0.98 in) of precipitation over 5 days.

Climate data for Samedan Airport, elevation 1,709 m (5,607 ft), (1991–2020 normals, extremes 1901–present)
Month	Jan	Feb	Mar	Apr	May	Jun	Jul	Aug	Sep	Oct	Nov	Dec	Year
Record high °C (°F)	12.9 (55.2)	11.7 (53.1)	14.1 (57.4)	21.0 (69.8)	28.0 (82.4)	32.0 (89.6)	30.5 (86.9)	29.2 (84.6)	25.1 (77.2)	21.4 (70.5)	17.0 (62.6)	13.4 (56.1)	32.0 (89.6)
Mean daily maximum °C (°F)	−1.3 (29.7)	0.5 (32.9)	4.0 (39.2)	7.9 (46.2)	12.9 (55.2)	17.0 (62.6)	19.3 (66.7)	18.8 (65.8)	14.6 (58.3)	10.5 (50.9)	4.1 (39.4)	−0.7 (30.7)	9.0 (48.2)
Daily mean °C (°F)	−8.4 (16.9)	−7.1 (19.2)	−2.4 (27.7)	1.9 (35.4)	6.7 (44.1)	10.5 (50.9)	12.3 (54.1)	11.8 (53.2)	7.9 (46.2)	3.6 (38.5)	−2.1 (28.2)	−7.0 (19.4)	2.3 (36.1)
Mean daily minimum °C (°F)	−15.8 (3.6)	−15.6 (3.9)	−9.6 (14.7)	−4.3 (24.3)	0.1 (32.2)	3.2 (37.8)	4.7 (40.5)	4.7 (40.5)	1.3 (34.3)	−2.6 (27.3)	−7.8 (18.0)	−13.4 (7.9)	−4.6 (23.7)
Record low °C (°F)	−36.9 (−34.4)	−35.1 (−31.2)	−30.0 (−22.0)	−21.7 (−7.1)	−18.6 (−1.5)	−9.5 (14.9)	−5.4 (22.3)	−6.7 (19.9)	−11.6 (11.1)	−21.4 (−6.5)	−29.9 (−21.8)	−34.4 (−29.9)	−36.9 (−34.4)
Average precipitation mm (inches)	29.4 (1.16)	19.0 (0.75)	23.7 (0.93)	36.9 (1.45)	67.0 (2.64)	90.9 (3.58)	86.8 (3.42)	100.4 (3.95)	73.2 (2.88)	76.6 (3.02)	69.8 (2.75)	36.6 (1.44)	710.3 (27.96)
Average snowfall cm (inches)	52.4 (20.6)	38.9 (15.3)	32.5 (12.8)	23.5 (9.3)	6.3 (2.5)	0.6 (0.2)	0.3 (0.1)	0.3 (0.1)	1.2 (0.5)	8.1 (3.2)	40.8 (16.1)	49.9 (19.6)	254.8 (100.3)
Average precipitation days (≥ 1.0 mm)	5.2	4.2	4.3	6.0	9.2	11.0	10.6	11.0	8.0	8.1	7.9	6.1	91.6
Average snowy days (≥ 1.0 cm)	9.1	7.4	7.6	5.8	1.5	0.3	0.1	0.1	0.6	2.0	6.8	9.1	50.4
Average relative humidity (%)	78	74	70	69	70	71	72	75	76	77	79	80	74
Mean monthly sunshine hours	120.0	121.3	147.4	150.2	164.4	185.8	199.1	180.9	154.9	138.1	103.2	102.0	1,767.3
Source 1: NOAA
Source 2: MeteoSwiss (snow 1981–2010) KNMI

== Cultural references ==
The Upper Engadine Cultural Archives is housed in the Chesa Planta in Samedan.

James Bond escapes from Blofeld's base at Piz Gloria to Samedan in Ian Fleming's On Her Majesty's Secret Service where he is rescued by his future wife, Tracy.

The nineteenth century campaigner for women's rights and the repeal of the Contagious Diseases Acts, Josephine Butler, holidayed in Samedan in 1881 preferring it to Pontresina. She walked extensively with friends whilst her husband, because of his rheumatism, painted and sketched. He preached at the local Protestant church, which was largely run by another English clergyman Mr Eardley.
