= Solliès-Pont =

- Commune
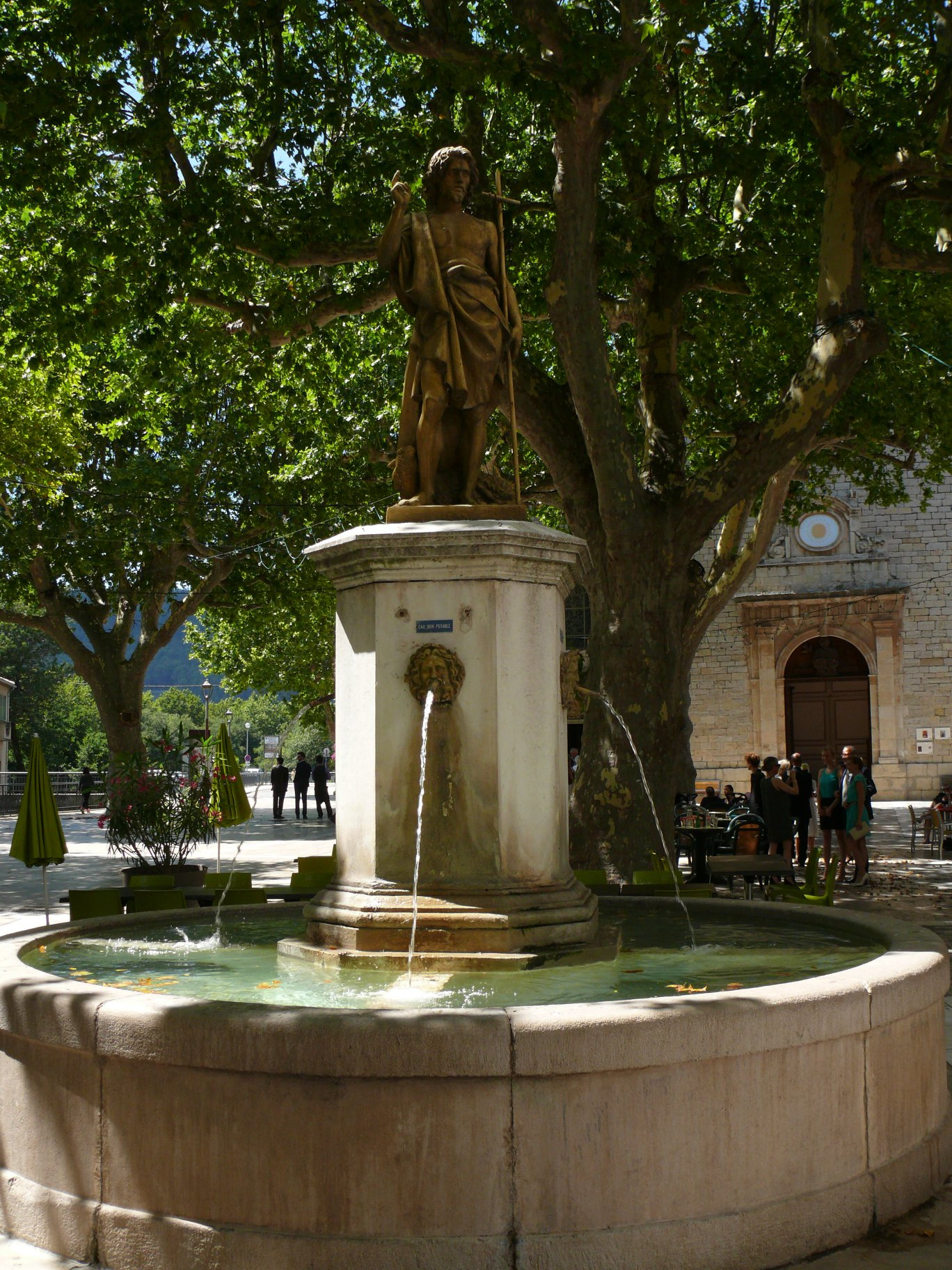
- The village square and the fountain of Saint-Jean-Baptiste

- Coat of arms
- Location of Solliès-Pont
- Location within France Location within Provence-Alpes-Côte d'Azur
- Coordinates: 43°11′28″N 6°02′30″E
- Country: France
- Region: Provence-Alpes-Côte d'Azur
- Department: Var
- Arrondissement: Toulon
- Canton: Solliès-Pont
- Intercommunality: Vallée du Gapeau

Government
  - Mayor (2020–2026): André Garron
- Area^{1}: 17.73 km^{2} (6.85 sq mi)
- Elevation: 72 m (236 ft)
- Highest elevation: 343 m (1,125 ft)
- Lowest elevation: 39 m (128 ft)
- Population (2023): 12,521
  - Density: 706.2/km^{2} (1,829/sq mi)
- Time zone: UTC+01:00 (CET)
  - Summer (DST): UTC+02:00 (CEST)
- INSEE/Postal code: 83130 /83210
- ^{1} French Land Register data, which excludes lakes, ponds, glaciers > 1 km^{2} (0.386 sq mi or 247 acres) and river estuaries.

Solliès-Pont (French pronunciation: [sɔljɛs pɔ̃]; Occitan: Soliers-Pònt) is a commune in the Var department in the Provence-Alpes-Côte d'Azur region in southeastern France.

It was the first location of the 1995 Cuers massacre.

== Population ==
Historical population
Year	Pop.	±% p.a.
1968	4,214	—
1975	4,549	+1.10%
1982	5,492	+2.73%
1990	9,525	+7.13%
1999	10,820	+1.43%
2007	10,792	−0.03%
2012	11,624	+1.50%
2017	11,149	−0.83%
2023	12,521	+1.95%
Source: INSEE

== In popular culture ==
Solliès-Pont is the setting of Vladimir Nabokov's 1923 Russian-language poem “Прованс” ("Provence"). The original poem and its English translation by the author were set to music by composers Ivan Barbotin and James DeMars as part of the song cycle "Sing, Poetry" on the 2011 contemporary classical album Troika.

== See also ==
- Communes of the Var department
