= Cuers massacre =

1995 mass murder

- Cuers massacre (Provence-Alpes-Côte d'Azur) Cuers massacre (France)
- Location: 43.2378°N 6.0730°E; Solliès-Pont and Cuers, Var, France
- Date: 23–24 September 1995 c. 7:30 – c. 08:00
- Weapons: Anschütz .22-caliber hunting rifle; Hammer; Baseball bat
- Deaths: 16 (including the perpetrator)
- Injuries: 4
- Perpetrator: Éric Borel
- Motive: Unknown

On 24 September 1995, a mass shooting took place in Cuers, Var, France. After murdering his parents and brother in Solliès-Pont the day prior, 16-year-old Éric Borel fatally shot twelve people and injured four others in a neighbouring village before killing himself to evade arrest.

The shooting in Cuers was the deadliest mass shooting in France since Abd el Maleck killed fifteen and injured nine people in Dieppe, Normandy. Both incidents were surpassed by the November 2015 Paris attacks, in which 130 people were killed.

== Attacks ==
=== Familicide ===
The series of attacks started on 23 September 1995, at about 18:00 CET, when Borel killed his stepfather, Yves Bichet, in the kitchen by shooting him four times with an Anschütz .22-caliber rifle. Police assumed that they had a quarrel beforehand, when Borel tried to run away from home. Next, Borel shot and killed his half-brother, 11-year-old Jean-Yves Bichet, who was watching television. He also mutilated both of their bodies by bludgeoning their heads with a hammer. After wiping up the blood trails, Borel waited for his mother to come home. As soon as Borel's mother, Marie-Jeanne Parenti, arrived at home from church at about 20:30, he immediately killed her with a single shot to the head. In contrast to her husband and stepson, no blunt force was used on Parenti, although some reports have suggested that he beat her as well with either the hammer or a baseball bat.

After killing his mother, Borel again cleaned any traces of blood before covering all three bodies with sheets and closing all shutters and the steel gate to the house. Still armed with the rifle, Borel left Solliès-Pont carrying ammunition in his pockets and a bag with food, money, a raincoat, a map of Limoges, and a pistol loaded with rubber bullets. He initially travelled by car, but eventually he crashed it into a wall; he continued his path by foot.

The bodies of the Borel's murdered family were found at approximately 01:00 by Yves Bichet's son Jean-Luc, a student living in Antibes who only occasionally visited his father on weekends. After calling police, Jean-Luc was first considered a suspect in the murders when giving contradictory information. The absence of Borel remained undetected until about three hours later.

=== Cuers shooting ===
Borel arrived in Cuers at around 7:30 a.m., first heading for the home of his friend Allan Guillemette. When Allan's mother opened the door, Borel asked her to wake Allan so they could talk. Allan and Borel had a lengthy conversation in the garden, which is presumed to have been an attempt by Borel to convince Allan to run away with him to Limoges, where Borel's biological father lived. Allan apparently declined Borel's offer and walked back inside the house, with Borel retrieving his rifle from his bag and shooting Allan in the back, mortally wounding him.

Borel subsequently walked through the streets of Cuers, shooting at random passersby. Near the village entrance, Borel shot Ginette Vialette through an open window, mortally wounding her, as well as Denise Otto, whom he killed as she was bringing the trash out. He also hit Otto's husband, Jean, in the shoulder. Subsequently, Borel injured an elderly woman who was walking in the streets with her husband and shot and wounded two brothers who were crossing his path. The shots he fired at Rodolphe Incorvala, once again through an open window, were eventually lethal; he later died in a hospital. Borel crossed the street to shoot and kill shopkeeper Mario Pagani, who was out buying a newspaper, with shots in the abdomen and head, as well as Mohammed Maarad in front of the Café du Commerce. Marius Boudon and André Touret were killed while they were drawing money from an ATM, and Andrée Coletta while she was taking her poodle for a walk. The last person killed at the scene was Pascal Mostachi, who was shot at Place Peyssoneau. Some passersby initially mistook the gunshots for firecrackers and mistook the armed Borel for a pigeon hunter. As it was hunting season, Borel did not initially attract attention by carrying the rifle.

By 08:00, police arrived at the scene. Borel initially fled 91 metres (300 ft) through nearby vinyards, but was ultimately surrounded at Collège de la Ferrage, where he fatally shot himself in the head. Witnesses stated he had been poised and calm all the while, taking great care at aiming and shooting, hitting most of his victims in the head and returning when he did not hit properly the first time. In total, Borel had fired about forty shots.

On 23 October 1995, Jeanne Laugiero, 68, died in hospital from injuries sustained in the shooting. On 2 March 1996, 68-year-old Pierre Marigliano also died from his wounds, bringing the total death toll to fifteen.

=== Victims ===
- Yves Bichet, Éric Borel's stepfather
- Marie-Jeanne Parenti, Éric Borel's mother
- Jean-Yves Bichet, 11, Éric Borel's half-brother
- Allan Guillemette, 17, a friend of Éric Borel
- Marius Boudon, 59
- Andrée Coletta, 65
- Rodolphe Incorvala, 59
- Mohammed Maarad, 41
- Pascal Mostachi, 15
- Denise Otto, 77
- Mario Pagani, 81
- André Touret, 62
- Ginette Vialette, 48
- Jeanne Laugiero, 68
- Pierre Marigliano, 68

Among the wounded were Jean Otto and Jean Boursereau.

== Perpetrator ==
Class photo of Borel

Éric Borel (French: [bɔʁɛl], born 11 December 1978) was the son of Marie-Jeanne Parenti and Jacques Borel, who were both working in the military at the time of his birth. However, their liaison was rather short, and after they separated, Borel was sent to Jacques' parents in Limoges, where he stayed until he was five. When his mother, who had visited Borel only occasionally up to that time, began to live with Yves Bichet, she again took care of her son and brought him to their home in Solliès-Pont.

Borel's mother was an authoritarian and a devoutly religious member of the Secours catholique. She mistreated and beat her son, who she believed to be a "child of sin". Borel never developed a close relationship with his stepfather, with whom he was said to have frequent rows and who reportedly also beat him on occasions. However, Franck and Jean-Luc Bichet, Yves Bichet's sons, stated that their father had always been nice to Borel, even building him a shack for his chickens and other animals he took home.

At age eight, Borel broke his arm while outside, deciding to run away instead of returning home. He was found shortly after, shivering in pain from his injury. By his teens, Borel was known as a quiet and taciturn boy who kept to himself and developed an increasing admiration for the military. He told lies about the heroic deeds of his father during the Indochina War and adored his stepbrother Franck Bichet, who served in the army. Borel had an interest in firearms and used to shoot sparrows with an air gun.

Borel attended the lycée professionnel Georges-Cisson in Toulon, where he studied electromechanics and did well academically. He was said to be a disciplined and quiet student. However, in his last year at school, there was a radical change in Borel's behavior. He skipped classes without explanation and became unaffable. He also regularly said that he could not bear it anymore at home, that he had had enough of doing housework and being called names and often stated his wish to join the military like his father and grandfather. Apparently, the week prior to the shooting, Borel also told one of his classmates that he would kill himself, but not before killing two or three people. Borel's only known friend at school was 17-year-old Allan Guillemette, one of the later victims, who was known as an outgoing and popular classmate.

== Investigation ==
According to Agence France-Presse, Nazi paraphernalia was found in Borel's bedroom during a search of the family home, consisting of several pictures of Adolf Hitler, neo-Nazi books and pamphlets, a "slightly revised" Nazi flag, and "scribblings" containing far-right content. On the walls, besides movie and rock band posters, there were also a hand-drawn swastika and a SS rune. Other items included literature on World War II and video cassettes containing the movies The Silence of the Lambs and The Terminator as well as a documentary about the Waco siege. By 29 September, lead investigator Marcel Kapfer stated that there was no indication that Borel harbored far-right political views and that he instead only had a historical interest in war, noting that both his biological father and older brother served in the French Armed Forces.

Besides the initial theory of a neo-Nazi motive, there was misinformation about Borel's background to hint at non-existent events from his personal life. In a widely disseminated television interview, a girl in Cuers stated that Borel had told her about his relationship with his half-sister Caroline, who was supposed to be his pregnant girlfriend. Another rumour claimed that Borel's father had recently died of cancer. However, Borel had no sister and his father was still alive.

== Aftermath ==
On 26 September, a solidarity fund was set up for the victims. On 29 September, a public funeral service was held for ten of the victims in Cuers. The Prefect of Var, Jean-Pierre Richer, and the Bishop of Fréjus, Joseph Madec, were in attendance, with Madec holding the commemorative church service. Cuers mayor Guy Guigou read a eulogy written by the local middle school for two of its killed students, Pascal Mostachi and Allan Guillemette, with family and friends of the latter forming the tail end of the funeral procession with a placard depiciting a dolphin, the symbol of Guillemette's rock band, Black Dolphins.
