= Upper Engadine Cultural Archives =

- Kulturarchiv Oberengadin
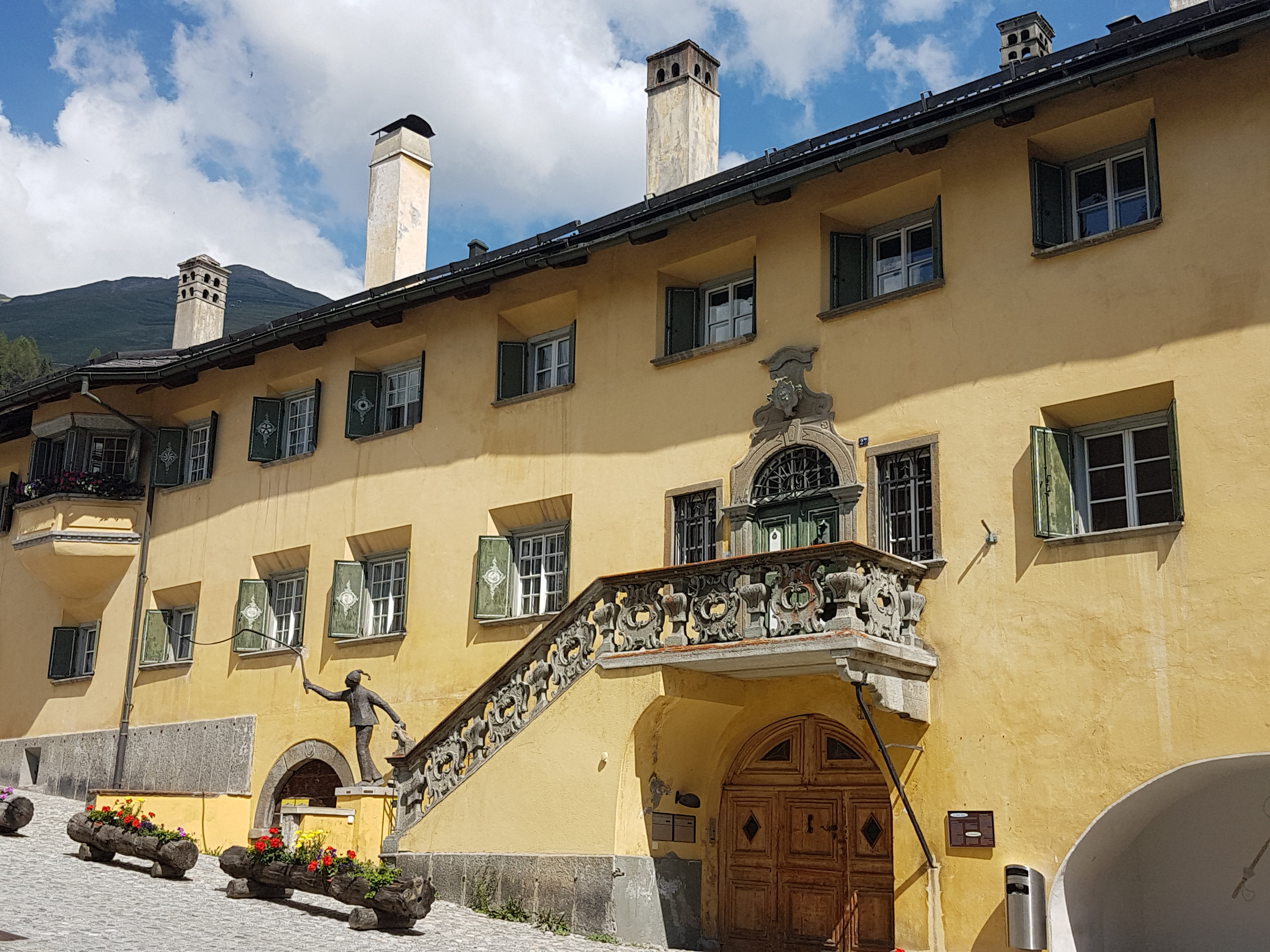
- Chesa Planta Suot, Zuoz
- 46°36′08″N 9°57′34″E
- Location: Zuoz, Switzerland
- Established: 1988

Other information
- Director: Kurt Gritsch
- Employees: 5
- Website: www.kulturarchiv.ch

The Upper Engadine Cultural Archives is collecting of historical records and documents from Upper Engadine (Switzerland) and the neighbouring region. The Archives are housed in the Chesa Planta Suot in Zuoz. The building and its library are a Swiss heritage sites of national significance.

== Activities ==
The goal of the Archives is to collect and conduct research on the cultural heritage of the Upper Engadine and the surrounding regions. The organization makes its materials accessible to the public and addresses the arts, architecture, language, music, nature study, development of hotels, tourism, traffic and sport in the Engadine.

Since it was established in 1988, the Archives received or purchased more than 500 inheritances and gifts, consisting of posthumous productions, documentations and documents on art, architecture, language, music, natural history etc. Some of the most important available records are the family inheritance of the physicians Berry from St. Moritz, a collection of photographs by Gustav Sommer of Samedan, which includes over 50,000 negatives about the Engadine, 3,000 letters of the families Puonz, Curtin, Fonio from Sils – confectioners and ale brewers in Berlin, 420 Engadine photographs by Elizabeth Main (Elizabeth Hawkins-Whitshed), the inheritance of the architect Max Alioth of St. Moritz, drawings and sketches of the ornamental painter Kaspar Donatsch of Celerina, as well as the inheritance of Elvezia Michel, the artist from Borgonovo, Bregaglia.

Dora Lardelli was the founder and director of the archives from 1988 to 2023. Many volunteers support the archives.

In 2024, the archive moved from Samedan to its new location in the Chesa Planta in Zuoz.

== Gallery ==
Examples from the picture collection:

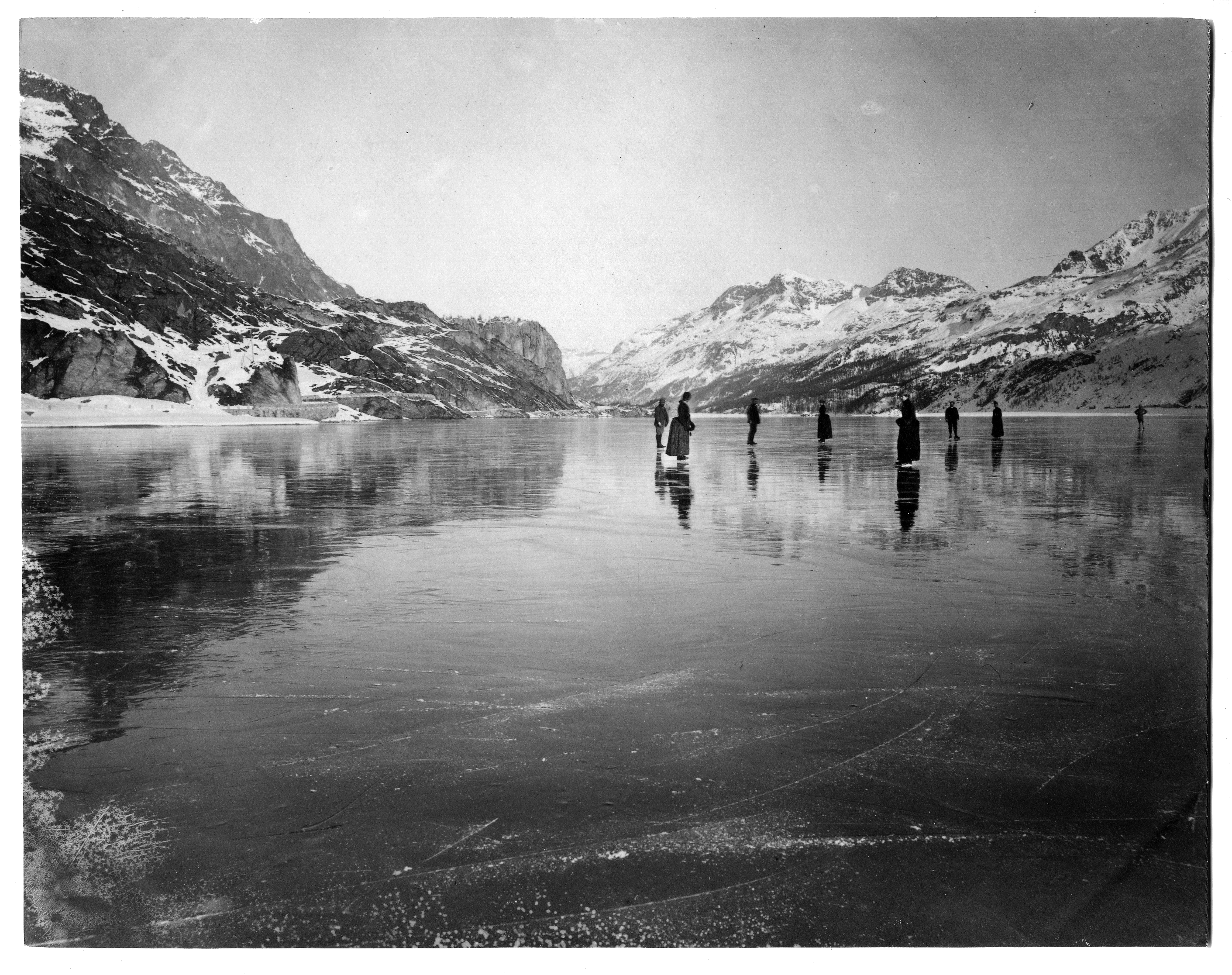
Skating on the lake of Sils. Photographed by Elizabeth Main

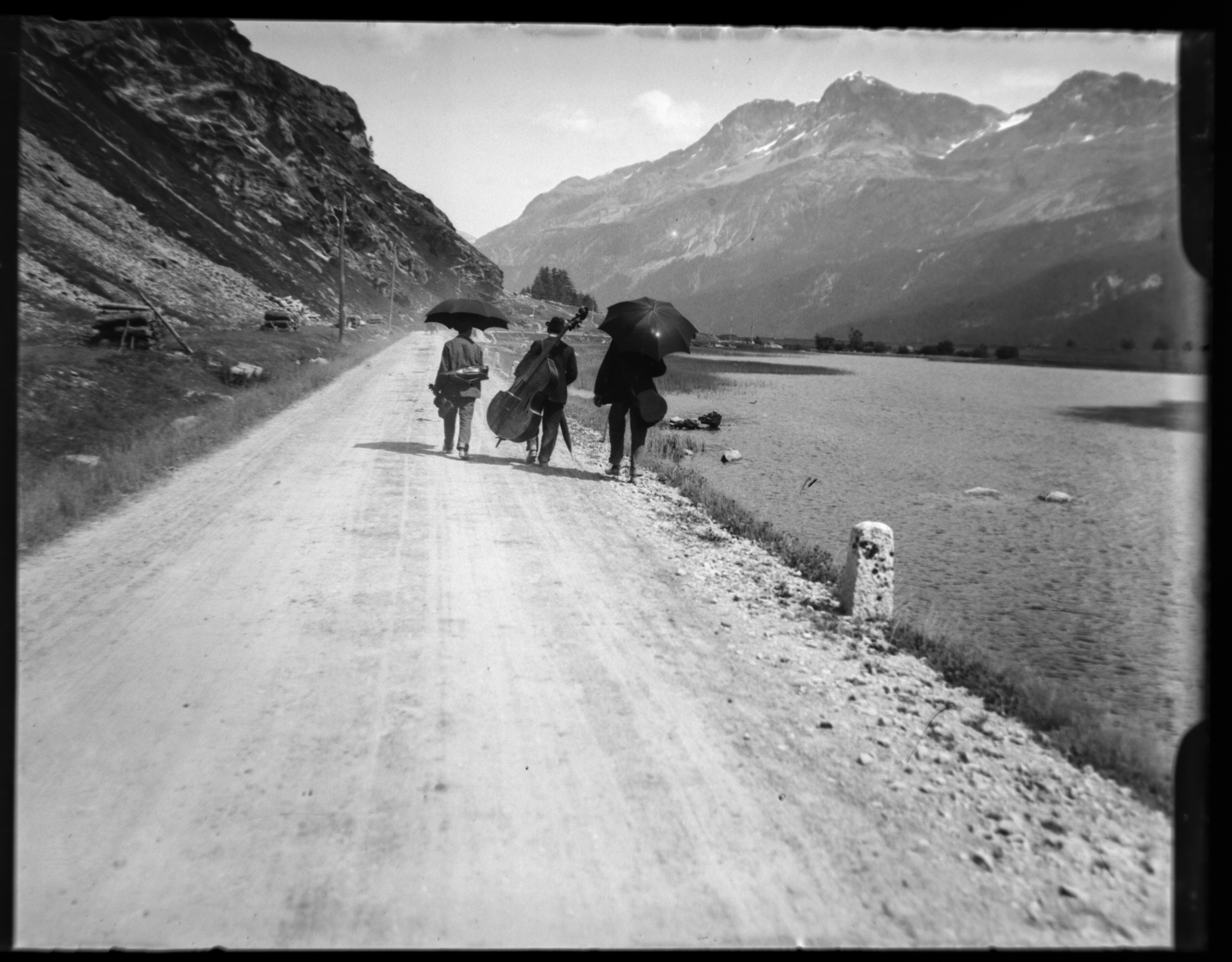
The musicians Fränzli near Sils, ca. 1900

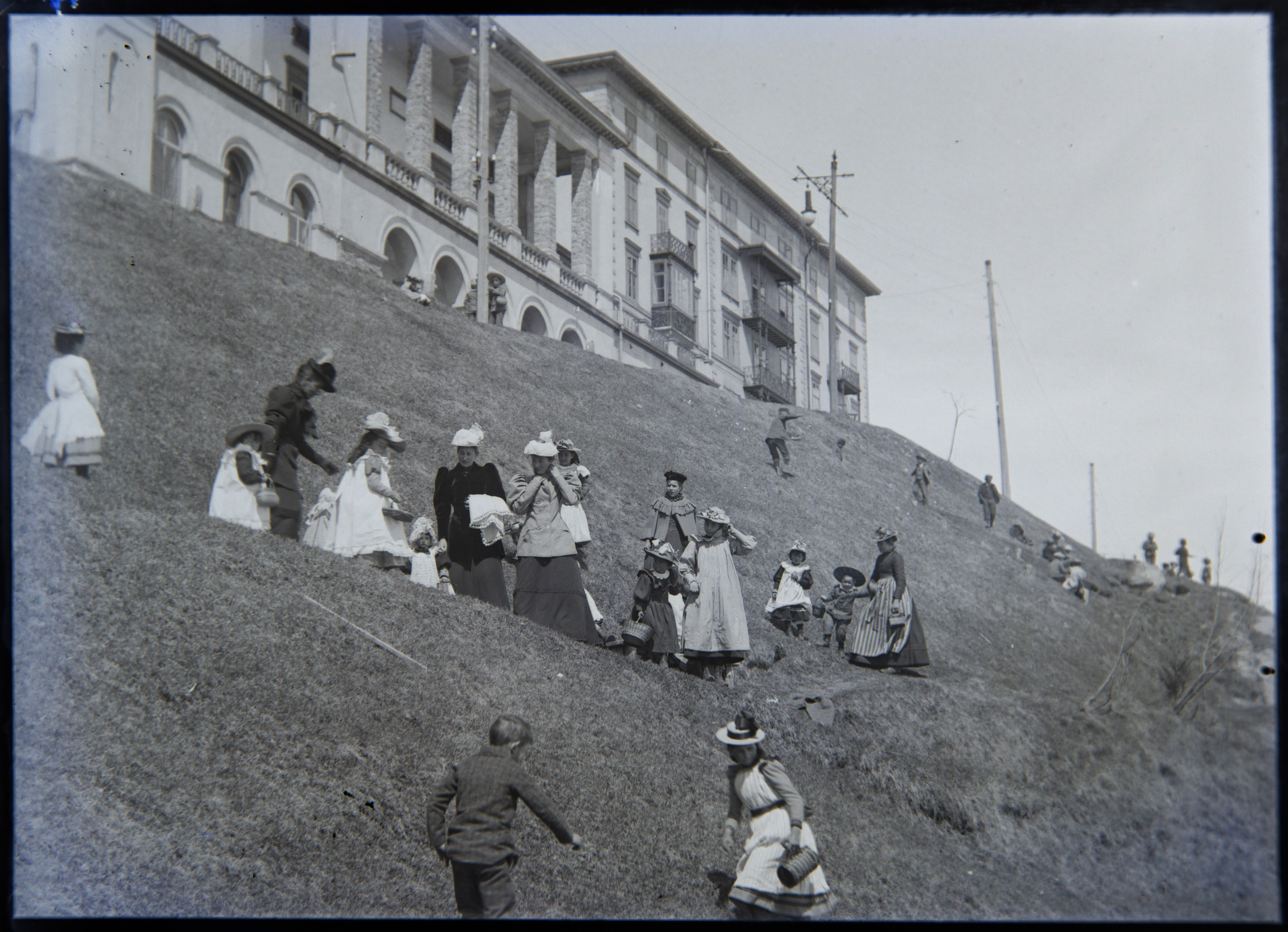
Kulm-Wiese St. Moritz, ca. 1900

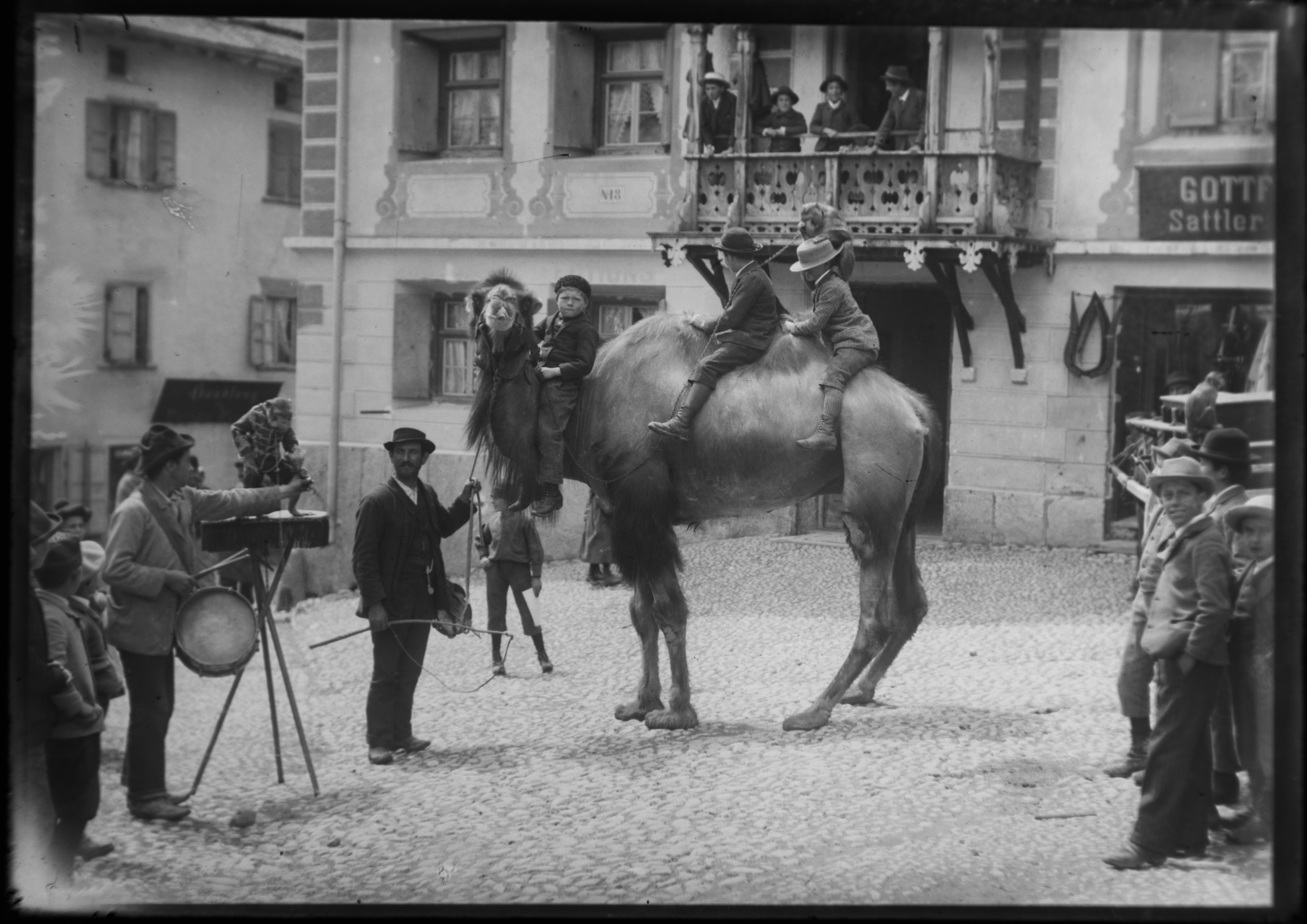
Camel in the middle of St. Moritz, ca. 1890

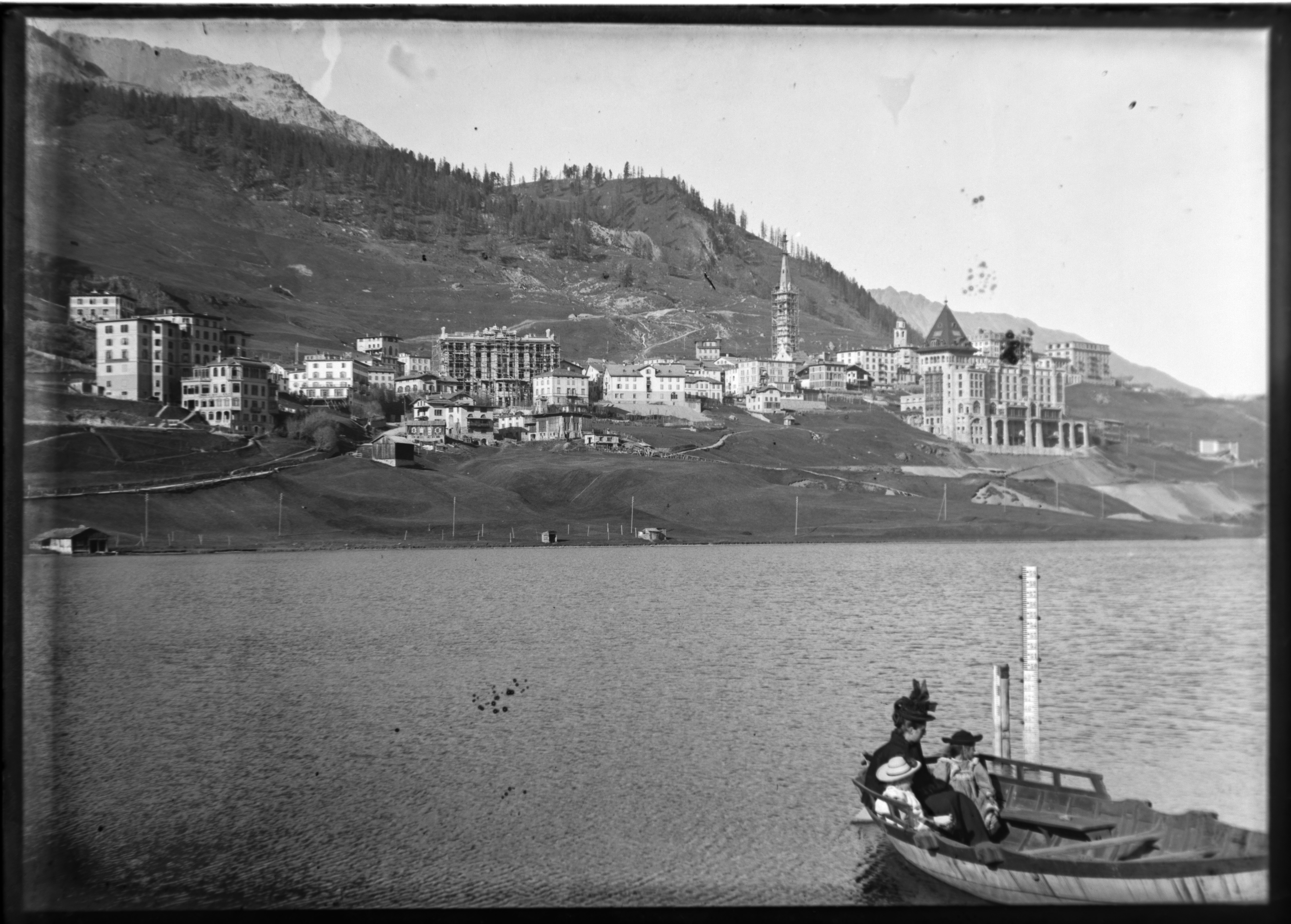
The lake of St. Moritz, ca. 1890

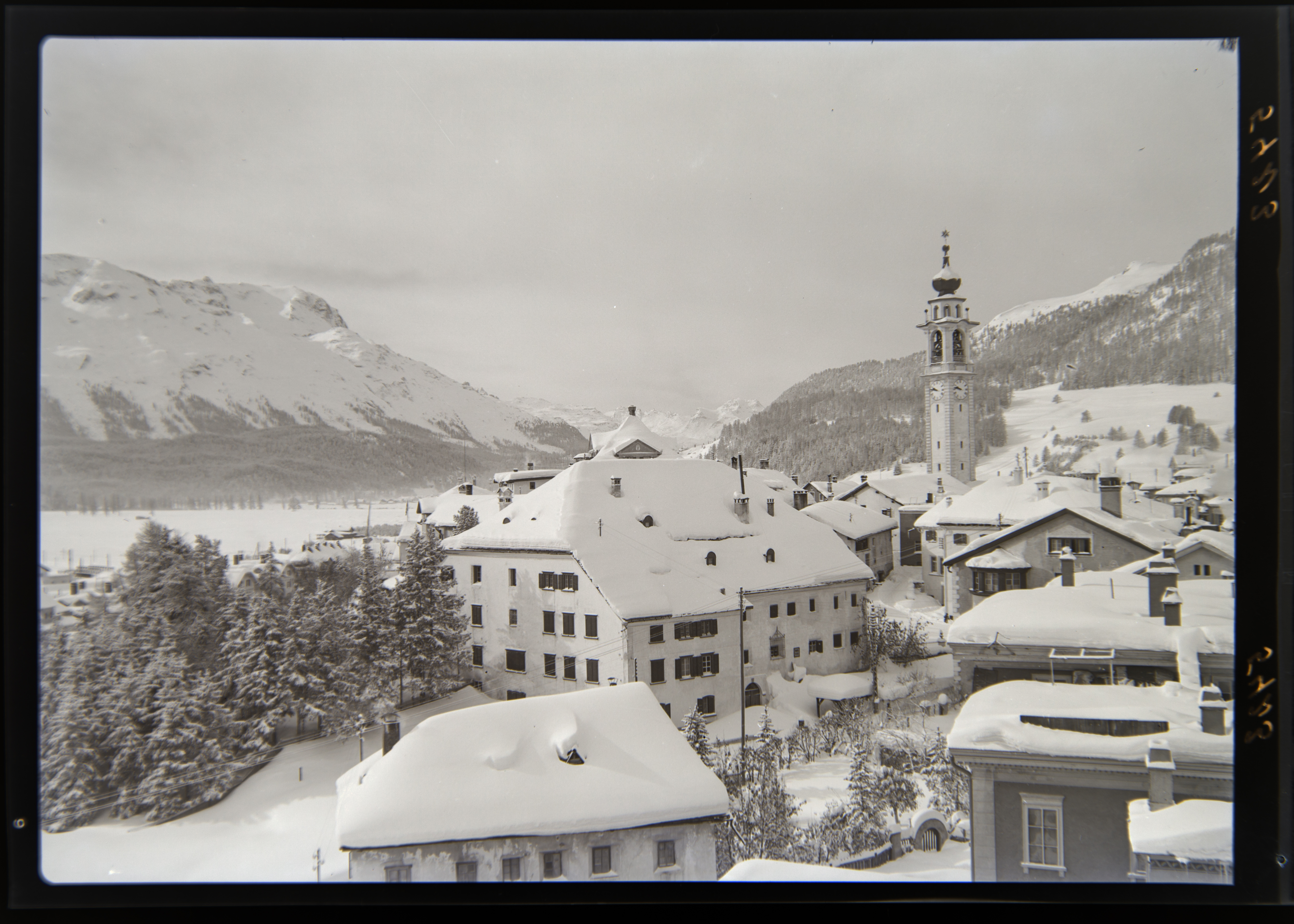
Samedan ca. 1930, with the Chesa Planta

== Bibliography ==
=== Publications about the Archives ===
- Dora Lardelli: Das Kulturarchiv Oberengadin – eine Pionierinstitution, in: Bündner Jahrbuch, Chur 2016
- Karl Wüst: Kulturarchiv Oberengadin in Samedan GR. „Bei Anfragen sage ich nie nein“, in: Da, wo etwas los ist. 15 Kulturorte in der Schweiz, Limmat Verlag, Zürich 2016
- Das Kulturarchiv Oberengadin feiert sein 25-Jahr-Jubiläum, in: Südostschweiz, 22. Juli 2013
- Gion Gaudenz und andere: 10 Jahre Kulturarchiv Oberengadin 1989–1999. Samedan 1999

=== Publications edited by the Archives ===
- Das Engadin auf Glasplatten. Gustav Sommer 1882–1956. Hrsg. vom Kulturarchiv Oberengadin. Montabella Verlag, St. Moritz 2015
- Dora Lardelli: The Magic Carpet. Kunstreise zu den Oberengadiner Hotels, 1850–1914. Hrsg. vom Kulturarchiv Oberengadin. Eine Publikation des Instituts für Kulturforschung Graubünden ikg, Chur. Verlag Skira, Mailand und Genf, 2010. Italienische und deutsche Ausgabe.
- List of publications
