= Courchevel Altiport =

Airport in Courchevel, France

Courchevel Altiport Altiport de Courchevel
- IATA: CVF; ICAO: LFLJ

Summary
- Airport type: Public
- Serves: Courchevel
- Location: Courchevel
- Opened: 1962; 64 years ago
- Elevation AMSL: 2,008 m (6,588 ft)
- Coordinates: 45°23′51″N 06°38′04″E

Map
- Location in Savoie CVF/LFLJ (France)

Runways
Direction	Length		Surface
Direction	m	ft	Surface
04/22	537	1,762	Asphalt

Courchevel Altiport (French: Altiport de Courchevel) (IATA: CVF, ICAO: LFLJ) is an altiport serving Courchevel, a ski resort in the French Alps. The airfield has a very short runway of only 537 metres (1,762 ft) with a gradient of 18.6%. There is no go-around procedure for landings at Courchevel due to the surrounding mountainous terrain. The airfield primarily sees use by smaller fixed-wing aircraft such as the Cessna 208 Caravan or Pilatus PC-12, as well as helicopters. The runway has no instrument approach procedure or lighting aids, making landing in fog or low clouds unsafe and almost impossible.

The airport is considered dangerous, as it features a difficult approach, an upward-sloping runway and ski runs in the adjacent area. The History Channel program Most Extreme Airports ranks it as the seventh most extreme airport in the world.

== History ==
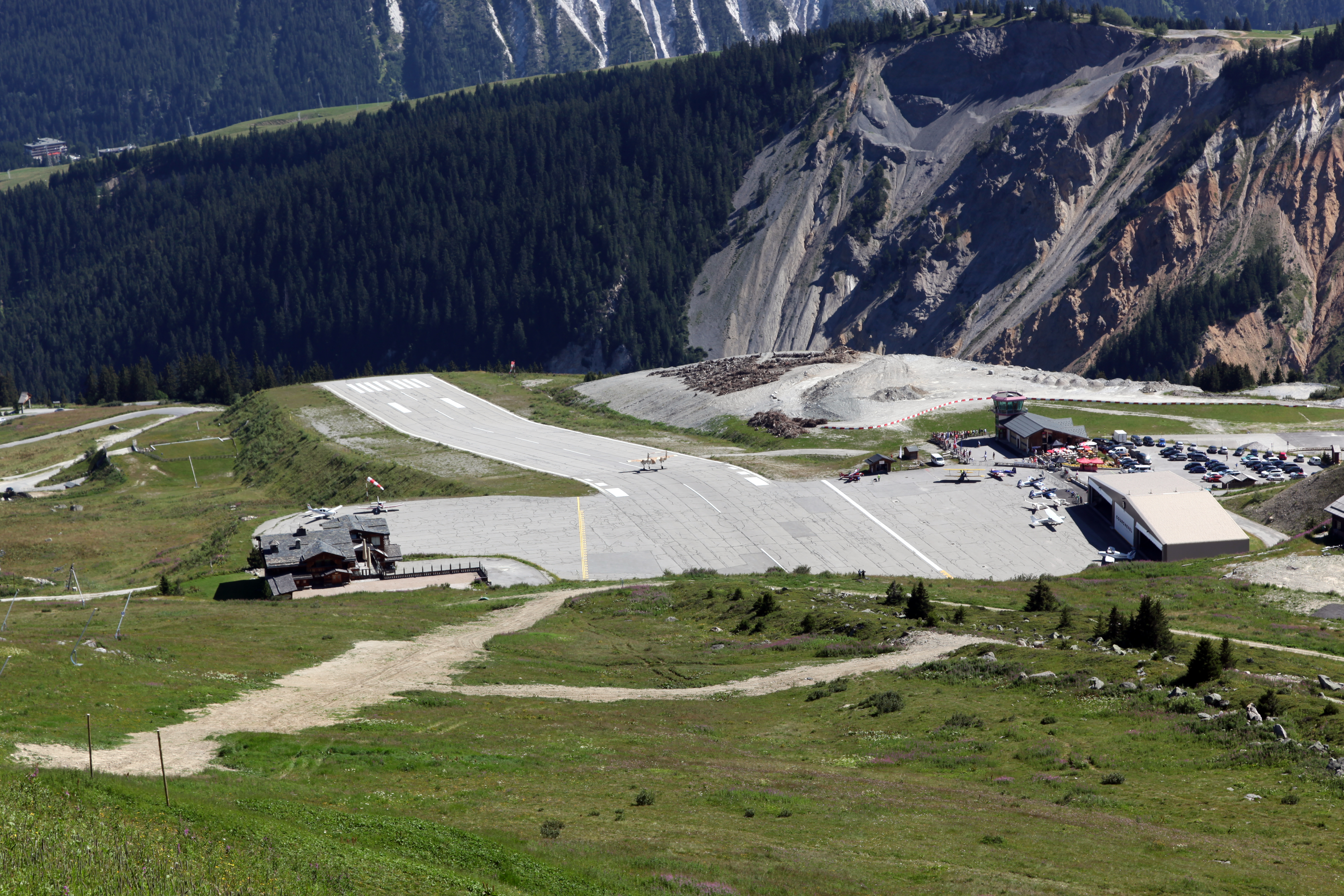
Courchevel Altiport

Courchevel Altiport was developed by Michel Ziegler in the early 1960s. Courchevel Altiport opened in 1961 and was the first mountain airport of its type. Michel, along with his wife Martine, owned a restaurant next to the runway. This facility still exists today as a restaurant and accommodation for skiers in the region.

Airport closed during the 2025-2026 airfield renovation.

In the early 1970s, Air Alpes operated scheduled flights between Paris Orly and Courchevel utilizing de Havilland Canada DHC-6 Twin Otter STOL-capable turboprop aircraft during the ski season. In case of bad weather, the aircraft landed in Chambery and the passengers were bused to Courchevel. Air Alpes had an office and desk in the Les Pilatus restaurant, which was later absorbed into the dining facility. In the 1980s, Tyrolean Airways served Courchevel with Dash-7 STOL-capable turboprop aircraft capable of carrying 54 passengers. More recently, other de Havilland Canada DHC-6 Twin Otters and DHC-7 Dash 7 turboprops have served the airport. Since 2014, Alpine Airlines is currently the only company worldwide to offer commercial flights to Courchevel Altiport.

== Facilities ==
As of 2024, the facilities at the altiport for aircraft include a 10 space hangar, a single fire truck, a tractor for aircraft towing and a refuelling station. Customers and pilots can make use of two small chalets by the runway.

== Incidents and accidents ==
- On 3 January 2003 a Cessna 172 that departed the altiport was forced to make an emergency landing in a field, after the aircraft was forced to divert to Albertville due to reduced throttle noted on takeoff from the Altiport. The original destination for the aircraft was Cuers.
- On 14 April 2016 a Piper PA-34 N1010FM stalled during landing flare, leading to a hard landing which ruptured the left main landing gear. The aircraft left the runway. There were no fatalities.
- On 1 July 2016 a Eurocopter EC120 Colibri F-GVTA lost control on final approach at 10m. The helicopter struck the ground and landed on its right side, causing a total loss of the aircraft.
- On 25 February 2017, a EAPC Pilatus PC-12 OO-PCI crashed on landing, following the pilot flying carrying out the final 5% lower than the guide slope.
- On 8 February 2019, Bluewings Piper PA-46 F-GUYZ crashed into a wall of snow after the pilot throttled back too late on landing. There were two minor injuries recorded.
- On 13 July 2019, a Cessna P210 N732RS crashed due to landing before the runway threshold.
- On 6 August 2021, a Piper PA-46 F-HYGA crashed after striking an embankment above the runway threshold which tore the aircraft's undercarriage. The aircraft continued along the runway for a further 100 meters, before coming to a halt and catching fire. There was one fatality.
- On 16 June 2022, a privately owned and operated Diamond DA42 F-HIMY crashed into an embankment.
- On 17 February 2024, a EAPC Pilatus PC-12 OO-PCN crashed on landing, with the aircraft overrunning onto a snow covered embankment and a wing being torn off. There were two crew members onboard, and no fatalities.

== Tour de France ==
The altiport has been used as the finish line of Tour de France stages on numerous occasions, given its steep gradient and location close to the ski resort of Courchevel.

Year	Stage	Start	Finish	Stage length
1997	14	Le Bourg-d'Oisans	Courchevel	148.0 km (92.0 mi)
2000	15	Briançon	Courchevel	173.5 km (107.8 mi)
2005	10	Grenoble	Courchevel	177.0 km (110.0 mi)
2023	17	Saint-Gervais-les-Bains	Courchevel	166 km (103 mi)

== In popular culture ==
The altiport served as a filming location for the 1997 James Bond film Tomorrow Never Dies, where it stood in for a terrorist arms bazaar located in a remote, snow-bound region of the Russian Far East. In the film's pre credits opening sequence, James Bond (Pierce Brosnan) infiltrates the base and narrowly escapes by commandeering a Aero L-39 Albatros fighter jet, utilizing the altiport's famously steep, upward sloping runway to achieve takeoff just as the facility is destroyed.
