= Cuers-Pierrefeu Aerodrome =

Airport in Provence-Alpes-Côte d'Azur, France

Cuers-Pierrefeu Aerodrome Aérodrome de Cuers-Pierrefeu
- IATA: none; ICAO: LFTF

Summary
- Airport type: Public / Military
- Serves: Cuers and Pierrefeu-du-Var
- Elevation AMSL: 269 ft (82 m)
- Coordinates: 43°14′51″N 6°7′38″E

Maps
- Provence-Alpes-Côte d'Azur in France

- Location in Provence-Alpes-Côte d'Azur region

Runways
Direction	Length		Surface
Direction	m	ft	Surface
11/29	1,925	6,316	Asphalt
- Source: AIP France

Cuers-Pierrefeu Aerodrome (French: Aérodrome de Cuers-Pierrefeu) (ICAO: LFTF) is a aerodrome in the Var department of the region of Provence-Alpes-Côte d'Azur, France.

It is home of the Aéroclub du Var.
