= Cuers =

- Commune
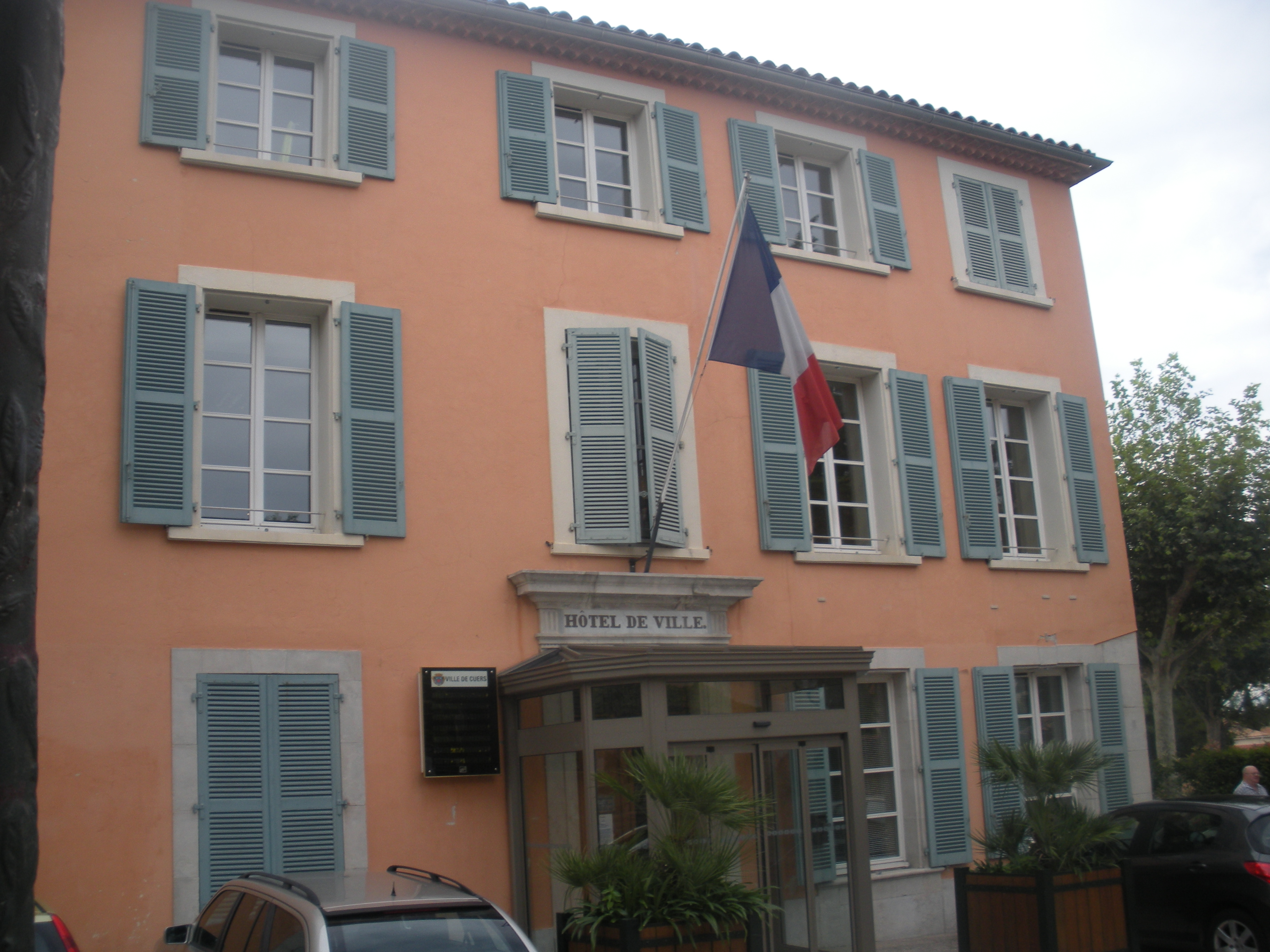
- The town hall of Cuers

- Coat of arms
- Location of Cuers
- Location within France Location within Provence-Alpes-Côte d'Azur
- Coordinates: 43°14′18″N 6°04′18″E
- Country: France
- Region: Provence-Alpes-Côte d'Azur
- Department: Var
- Arrondissement: Toulon
- Canton: Solliès-Pont

Government
  - Mayor (2020–2026): Bernard Mouttet
- Area^{1}: 50.53 km^{2} (19.51 sq mi)
- Elevation: 131 m (430 ft)
- Highest elevation: 700 m (2,300 ft)
- Lowest elevation: 71 m (233 ft)
- Population (2023): 13,271
  - Density: 262.6/km^{2} (680.2/sq mi)
- Time zone: UTC+01:00 (CET)
  - Summer (DST): UTC+02:00 (CEST)
- INSEE/Postal code: 83049 /83390
- ^{1} French Land Register data, which excludes lakes, ponds, glaciers > 1 km^{2} (0.386 sq mi or 247 acres) and river estuaries.

Cuers (French pronunciation: [kɥɛʁs]) is a commune in the Var department in the Provence-Alpes-Côte d'Azur region in southeastern France.

It has an aerodrome, Cuers-Pierrefeu Aerodrome, shared with nearby Pierrefeu.

It was one of the locations of the 1995 Cuers massacre.

== Geography ==
=== Climate ===
Cuers has a hot-summer Mediterranean climate (Köppen climate classification Csa). The average annual temperature in Cuers is 15.5 °C (59.9 °F). The average annual rainfall is 778.9 mm (30.67 in) with November as the wettest month. The temperatures are highest on average in July, at around 24.4 °C (75.9 °F), and lowest in January, at around 7.9 °C (46.2 °F). The highest temperature ever recorded in Cuers was 41.3 °C (106.3 °F) on 5 August 2017; the coldest temperature ever recorded was −9.3 °C (15.3 °F) on 2 March 2005.

Climate data for Cuers (1991−2020 normals, extremes 1998−present)
Month	Jan	Feb	Mar	Apr	May	Jun	Jul	Aug	Sep	Oct	Nov	Dec	Year
Record high °C (°F)	23.3 (73.9)	25.1 (77.2)	28.4 (83.1)	27.9 (82.2)	35.1 (95.2)	39.0 (102.2)	39.8 (103.6)	41.3 (106.3)	35.9 (96.6)	31.1 (88.0)	25.6 (78.1)	23.1 (73.6)	41.3 (106.3)
Mean daily maximum °C (°F)	13.7 (56.7)	14.5 (58.1)	17.5 (63.5)	20.5 (68.9)	24.5 (76.1)	29.3 (84.7)	32.4 (90.3)	32.3 (90.1)	27.6 (81.7)	22.8 (73.0)	17.4 (63.3)	14.3 (57.7)	22.2 (72.0)
Daily mean °C (°F)	7.9 (46.2)	8.3 (46.9)	10.9 (51.6)	13.8 (56.8)	17.7 (63.9)	21.7 (71.1)	24.4 (75.9)	24.2 (75.6)	20.4 (68.7)	16.5 (61.7)	11.7 (53.1)	8.6 (47.5)	15.5 (59.9)
Mean daily minimum °C (°F)	2.0 (35.6)	2.1 (35.8)	4.3 (39.7)	7.1 (44.8)	10.8 (51.4)	14.1 (57.4)	16.4 (61.5)	16.1 (61.0)	13.1 (55.6)	10.2 (50.4)	6.1 (43.0)	2.9 (37.2)	8.8 (47.8)
Record low °C (°F)	−9.1 (15.6)	−9.3 (15.3)	−9.3 (15.3)	−4.4 (24.1)	1.3 (34.3)	5.5 (41.9)	7.9 (46.2)	7.2 (45.0)	3.1 (37.6)	−1.4 (29.5)	−8.8 (16.2)	−9.1 (15.6)	−9.3 (15.3)
Average precipitation mm (inches)	73.4 (2.89)	54.8 (2.16)	57.4 (2.26)	57.1 (2.25)	56.7 (2.23)	33.5 (1.32)	15.6 (0.61)	19.3 (0.76)	76.6 (3.02)	105.5 (4.15)	141.4 (5.57)	87.6 (3.45)	778.9 (30.67)
Average precipitation days (≥ 1.0 mm)	5.7	5.3	5.2	6.1	5.0	2.8	1.6	2.1	4.5	6.3	8.8	6.3	59.6
Source: Météo-France

== Population ==
Historical population
Year	Pop.	±% p.a.
1968	5,107	—
1975	5,453	+0.94%
1982	6,571	+2.70%
1990	7,027	+0.84%
1999	8,174	+1.69%
2007	9,737	+2.21%
2012	10,452	+1.43%
2017	11,425	+1.80%
2023	13,271	+2.53%
Source: INSEE

== See also ==
- Communes of the Var department
