= Comunità montana di Valle Camonica =

Coordinates: 45.9586°N 10.3056°E

- union of comuni
- Interactive map of Comunità montana di Valle Camonica
- Country: Italy
- Region: Lombardy
- Province: Brescia
- Comuni: Angolo Terme; Artogne; Berzo Demo; Berzo Inferiore; Bienno; Borno; Braone; Breno; Capo di Ponte; Cedegolo; Cerveno; Ceto; Cevo; Cimbergo; Cividate Camuno; Corteno Golgi; Darfo Boario Terme; Edolo; Esine; Gianico; Incudine; Losine; Lozio; Malegno; Malonno; Monno; Niardo; Ono San Pietro; Ossimo; Paisco Loveno; Paspardo; Pian Camuno; Piancogno; Ponte di Legno; Prestine; Saviore dell'Adamello; Sellero; Sonico; Temù; Vezza d'Oglio; Vione
- Seat: 3 Piazza Tassara, 25043 Breno (BS)

The Comunità montana di Valle Camonica is an administrative union of 41 comuni of the Valle Camonica, in the province of Brescia in north-east Lombardy, Italy. It is responsible for the administration of the Parco dell'Adamello nature reserve, which includes the Adamello mountain.
