= Oglio =

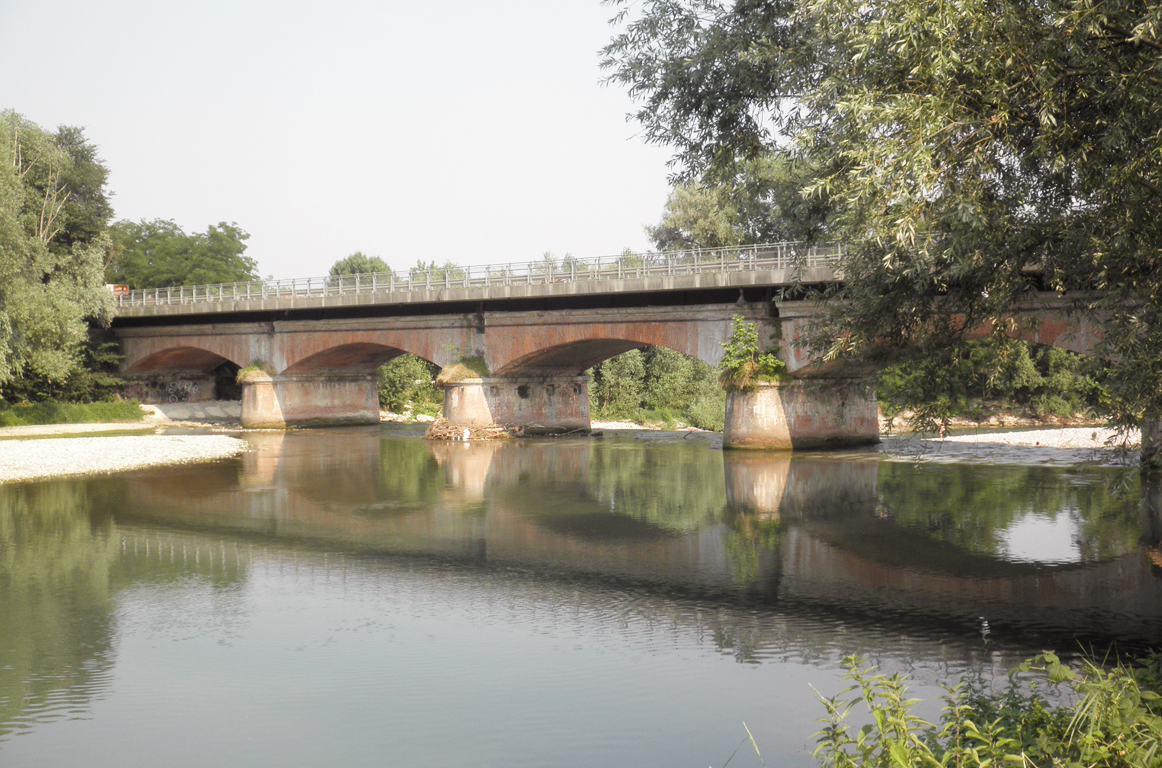
- The river between Soncino and Orzinuovi

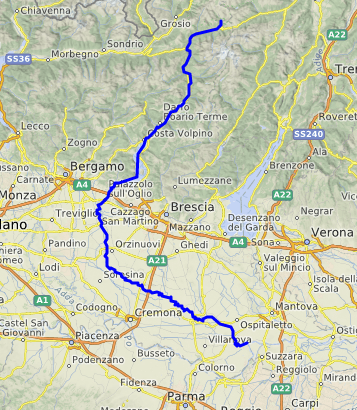
- Course of the river Oglio
- Native name: Òi / Ùi (Lombard)

Location
- country: Italy
- region: Lombardy
- provinces: Brescia, Bergamo, Cremona, Mantua

Physical characteristics
- Source: Valle delle Messi, as Frigidolfo branch
  - location: near Punta Valmalza, Sobretta-Gavia Group, Ortler Alps, Lombardy
  - coordinates: 46°20′31.5″N 10°27′03.5″E
  - elevation: 3,035 m (9,957 ft)
- 2nd source: Lake Ercavallo, Valle di Viso, as Arcanello branch
  - location: at the slopes of Cima di Caione, Ortler Alps, Lombardy
  - coordinates: 46°20′21.1″N 10°31′35.5″E
  - elevation: 2,621 m (8,599 ft)
- 3rd source: Lake Pisgana, as Narcanello branch
  - location: Narcanello Valley, near Vedretta di Pisgana, Presena glacier, Adamello-Presanella Alps, Lombardy
  - coordinates: 46°12′22″N 10°31′49″E
  - elevation: 2,500 m (8,200 ft)
- 4th source: Ogliolo branch
  - location: Corteno Valley, on the provincial border between Corteno Golgi, province of Brescia and Aprica, province of Sondrio, Lombardy, near Zappello dell'Asino
  - coordinates: 46°08′52″N 10°09′54.2″E
  - elevation: 1,172 m (3,845 ft)
- Source confluence: confluence of Frigidolfo and Narcanello branches
  - location: Ponte di Legno, province of Brescia, Lombardy
  - coordinates: 46°15′32.7″N 10°30′28.7″E
  - elevation: 1,253 m (4,111 ft)
- Mouth: Po
  - location: at the municipal border between Marcaria and Viadana, province of Mantua, Lombardy
  - coordinates: 45°02′40″N 10°39′37″E
- Length: 280 km (170 mi)
- Basin size: 6,649 km^{2} (2,567 mi^{2})
- Discharge
  - average: 137 m^{3}/s (4,800 cu ft/s)

Basin features
- Progression: Po→ Adriatic Sea

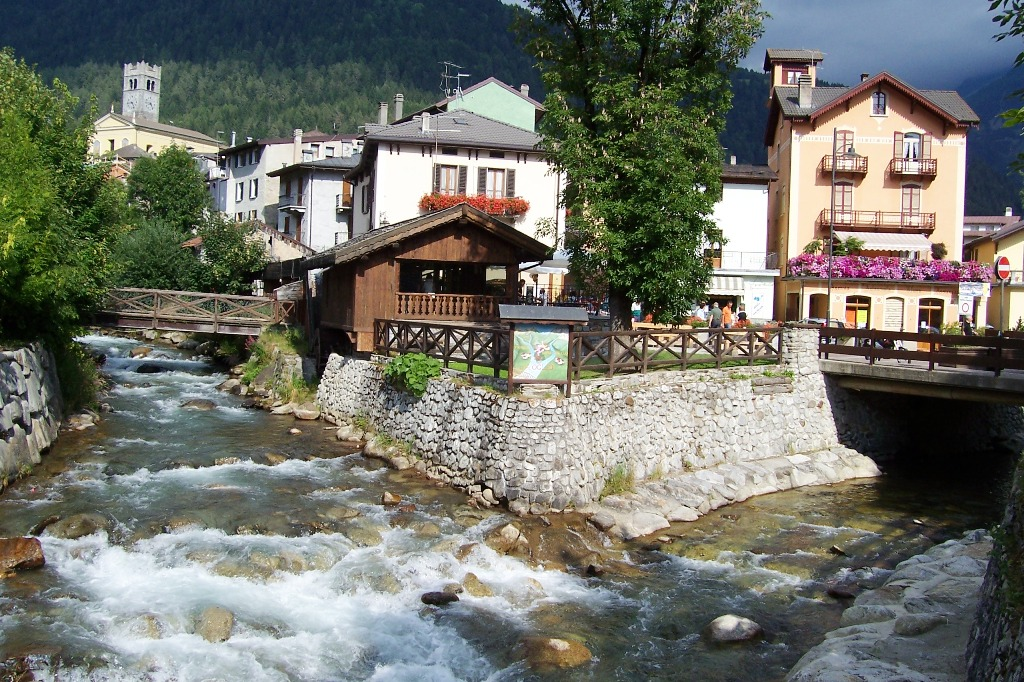
View of the confluence of the Frigidolfo branch (left) and the Narcanello branch (right), Ponte di Legno

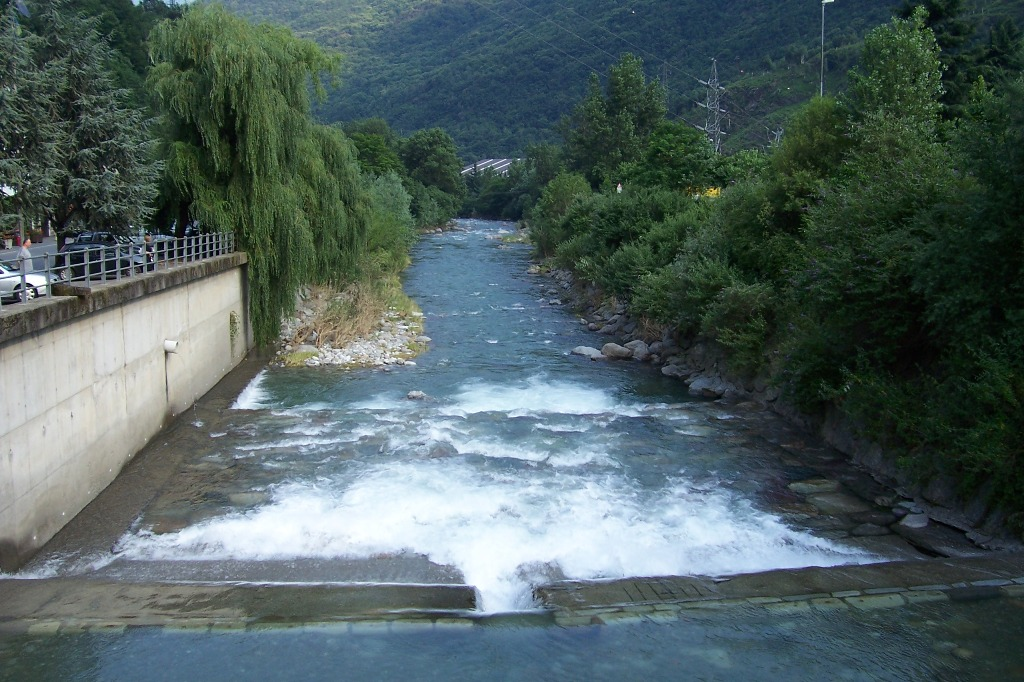
River Oglio at Berzo Demo, Val Camonica

The Oglio (Italian: [ˈɔʎʎo]; Latin: Ollius or Olius; Lombard: Òi, Cremonese: Ùi) is a left-bank tributary of the river Po in Lombardy, Italy. It is 280 kilometres (170 mi) long. In the hierarchy of the Po's tributaries, with its 280 kilometres (170 mi) of length, it occupies the 2nd place by length (after the river Adda), while it is the 4th per basin surface (after Tanaro, Adda and Ticino), and the 3rd per average discharge at the mouth (after Ticino and Adda).

== Overview ==
The Oglio is formed from the confluence of two mountain streams, the Narcanello branch from the Presena Glacier, in the Adamello group and the Frigidolfo branch, in the Corno dei Tre Signori, part of the Stelvio National Park. The two streams that merge near Pezzo di Ponte di Legno have an average discharge of 1.5 m^{3}/s (53 cu ft/s). The Frigidolfo branch, before merging with the Narcanello branch, receives the Arcanello branch, which have an average discharge of 0.5 m^{3}/s (18 cu ft/s), which receives a minor branch originating from Lake Ercavallo. The Ogliolo stream, with an average discharge of 2.5 m^{3}/s (88 cu ft/s) and a length of 20 kilometres (12 mi) (similar to the length of the main branch between the Frigidolfo-Narcanello merge at Ponte Di Legno and the Oglio-Ogliolo merge at Edolo) is sometimes considered a de facto fourth branch of the Oglio river.

It flows in a southwest direction, through Valcamonica and enters into the Lake Iseo at Costa Volpino. It leaves Lake Iseo at Sarnico and, after traveling a zone of moraine deposits, it joins the Po river at Torredoglio, not far from Cesole and Scorzarolo, in the province of Mantua. Its drainage basin, which corresponds to the region of Valle Camonica, covers 6,649 square kilometres (2,567 mi^{2}). It is part of the larger Po-Adige basin.

== Course of the river's main branch ==
=== Camonica Valley section ===
The river in the Camonica Valley flows almost exclusively in the province of Brescia, entering in the province of Bergamo only at 45°51′38.2″N 10°08′56″E, on the border between Artogne, Brescia and Rogno, Bergamo.

The following is a list (incomplete) of the tributaries in the Camonica Valley:

- Frigidolfo and Narcanello branches, also known as Oglio Frigidolfo and Oglio Narcanello, respectively, in Ponte di Legno at 46°15′32.7″N 10°30′28.7″E merge forming the main branch
- Valpaghera, at Vezza d'Oglio 46°14′10″N 10°23′59″E
- Valgrande, at Vezza d'Oglio 46°14′07″N 10°23′48″E
- Ogliolo branch, at Edolo 46°10′18.2″N 10°20′03″E
- Rabbia, at Sonico 46°09′01″N 10°20′44″E
- Remulo, at the border between Sonico and Malonno 46°07′43″N 10°19′56″E
- Allione, at the border between Malonno and Berzo Demo 46°05′24″N 10°18′58″E
- Poia river, at Cedegolo 46°04′37″N 10°20′54″E
- Re, at Sellero 46°03′31″N 10°21′05″E
- Re, at Capo di Ponte 46°02′10″N 10°20′43″E
- Clegna, at Capo di Ponte 46°01′35.5″N 10°20′38.6″E
- Figna, at municipal border between Nadro, Ceto and Ono San Pietro 46°00′45″N 10°20′37″E
- Blé stream, at municipal border between Cerveno and Ceto 46°00′32″N 10°20′34″E
- Palobbia creek, at municipal border between Ceto and Braone, near the quadruple municipal border with Losine and Cerveno 45°59′35.5″N 10°20′04.6″E
- Poia creek, at Losine 45°58′58.3″N 10°19′15.4″E
- Re, at Losine, near the municipal border between with Niardo 45°58′35″N 10°19′02″E
- Lanico stream, at the municipal border between Malegno and Cividate Camuno 45°57′05.5″N 10°16′42″E
- Trobiolo, at Cividate Camuno, near the municipal border with Cogno, Piancogno 45°56′03″N 10°14′49.5″E
- Grigna stream, Esine near the municipal border with Piancogno 45°55′14.3″N 10°13′54.7″E
- Resio, at Esine 45°54′25″N 10°13′22″E
- Davine river, at Darfo Boario Terme 45°53′16″N 10°11′04″E

- Budrio stream, at Erbanno, Darfo Boario Terme 45°53′56.1″N 10°12′00.5″E

- Dezzo river, at Darfo Boario Terme 45°53′16″N 10°11′04″E

- Gleno, at the triple municipal border between Vilminore di Scalve, Colere and Azzone

- Re stream, at Darfo Boario Terme 45°52′29.9″N 10°09′52″E
- Orso creek, at Rogno 45°50′57″N 10°08′06″E
- Supine creek, at Costa Volpino 45°49′40″N 10°06′16″E

=== Lake Iseo section ===
At Costa Volpino, the Oglio river enters the Iseo lake with a mixed delta-estuary mouth.

The tributaries of the Iseo lake
| Bergamo side: | Brescia side: |
|---|---|
| the Oglio main branch at 45°48′37″N 10°05′47″E; Borlezza stream, at Castro 45°48′06.55″N 10°03′45.49″E; Rino di Vigolo creek, at Tavernola Bergamasca 45°42′40.64″N 10°02′54.06″E; Rino creek, at Predore 45°40′45.66″N 10°01′01.27″E | Bagnadore creek, at Marone 45°44′25.98″N 10°05′24.36″E; Calchere creek, at Sulzano 45°41′30.77″N 10°06′03.28″E; Cortelo creek, at Iseo 45°39′49.28″N 10°03′00.43″E; Opolo creek, at Clusane, Iseo 45°39′55.03″N 10°00′04.42″E |

=== Po Valley section ===
The Oglio main branch leaves the lake at the provincial border between Sarnico, Bergamo and Paratico, Brescia 45°39′56.5″N 09°57′24″E and begins to follow (approximately) this provincial border. At the triple provincial border between Torre Pallavicina (Bergamo), Roccafranca (Brescia) and Soncino (Cremona) 45°25′40.5″N 09°53′07.5″E the Oglio begins to follow (approximately) the provincial border between the Brescia-Cremona provincial border.

The major tributaries in the Po valley are the following:

- Cherio river, at the provincial border between Palosco, Bergamo and Pontoglio, Brescia 45°34′44.5″N 09°50′30.53″E
- Mella river, at the provincial border and triple municipal border between Seniga (Brescia), Ostiano (Brescia), and Gabbioneta-Binanuova (Cremona) 45°13′30″N 10°13′10″E
- Chiese river, at the triple provincial border between Canneto sull'Oglio (Brescia), Acquanegra sul Chiese (Mantua) and Calvatone (Cremona) 45°08′28.01″N 10°25′17.45″E

At this triple provincial border the Oglio river begins following the Mantua-Cremona provincial border, which leaves at the triple municipal border between Acquanegra sul Chiese (Mantua), Calvatone (Cremona) and Bozzolo (Mantua) 45°07′57″N 10°29′32″E where the river enters entirely in the Mantua province.

At the municipal border between Marcaria and Viadana 45°02′40″N 10°39′37″E, the Oglio river enters the Po river.
