= Cerveno =

Cerveno Hervé
- Comune
- Comune di Cerveno
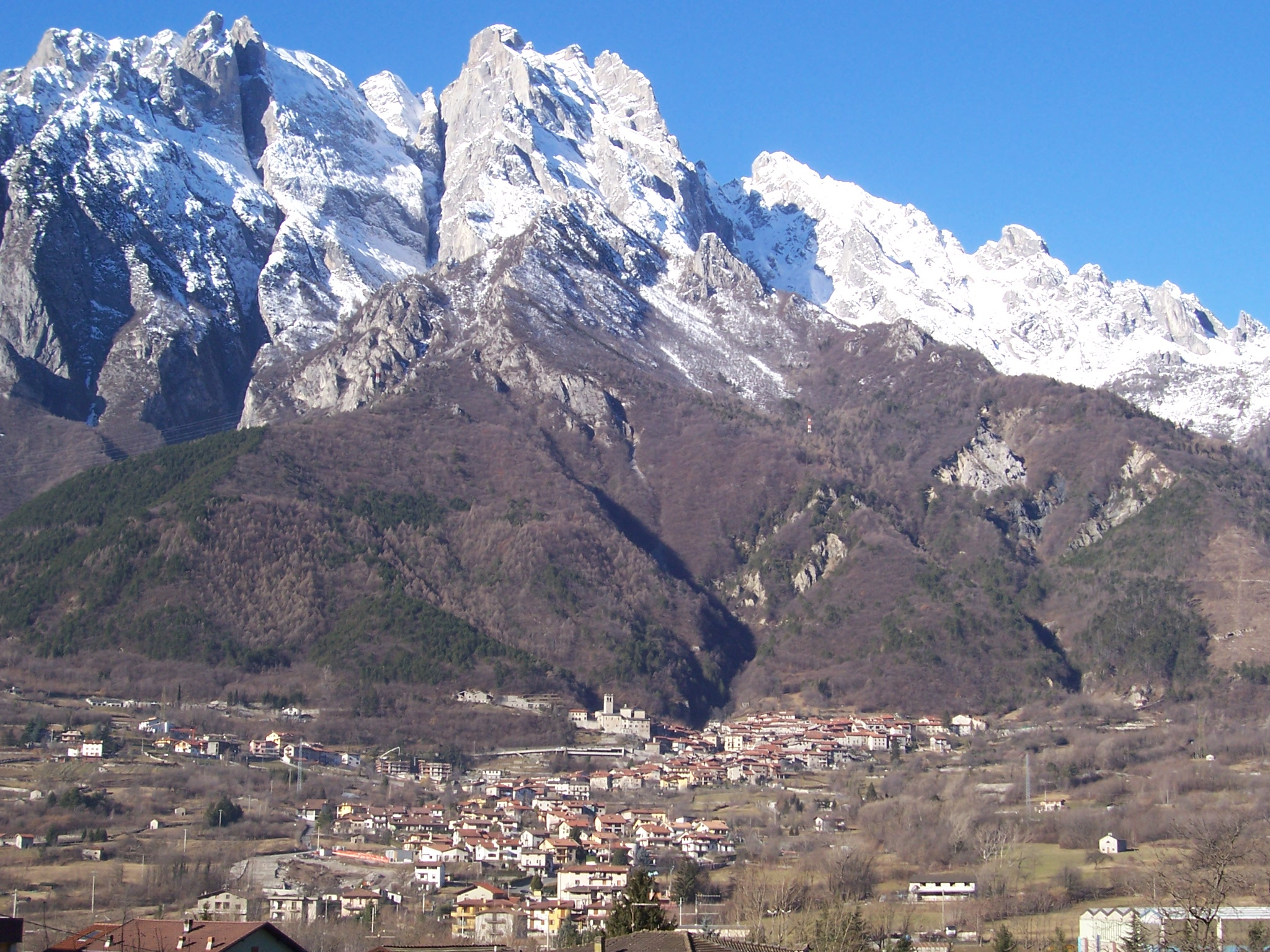

- Location within Italy Location within Lombardy
- Coordinates: 46°0′12″N 10°19′36″E
- Country: Italy
- Region: Lombardy
- Province: Brescia (BS)

Government
  - Mayor: Giancarlo Maculotti

Area
  - Total: 21.68 km^{2} (8.37 sq mi)
- Elevation: 500 m (1,600 ft)

Population (30 June 2017)
  - Total: 668
  - Density: 30.8/km^{2} (79.8/sq mi)
- Demonym: Cervenesi
- Time zone: UTC+1 (CET)
  - Summer (DST): UTC+2 (CEST)
- Postal code: 25040
- Dialing code: 0364
- Patron saint: Martin of Tours
- Saint day: 11 November
- Website: Official website

Cerveno (Camunian: Hervé) is a comune of 683 inhabitants in Val Camonica, province of Brescia, Lombardy, northern Italy.

The village of Cerveno is bounded by other communes of Braone, Ceto, Losine, Lozio, Malegno, Ono San Pietro, Paisco Loveno, Schilpario.

== History ==
At the 1397 peace of Breno, the representative of the community Cerveno chose the side of the Ghibellines.

== Main sights ==
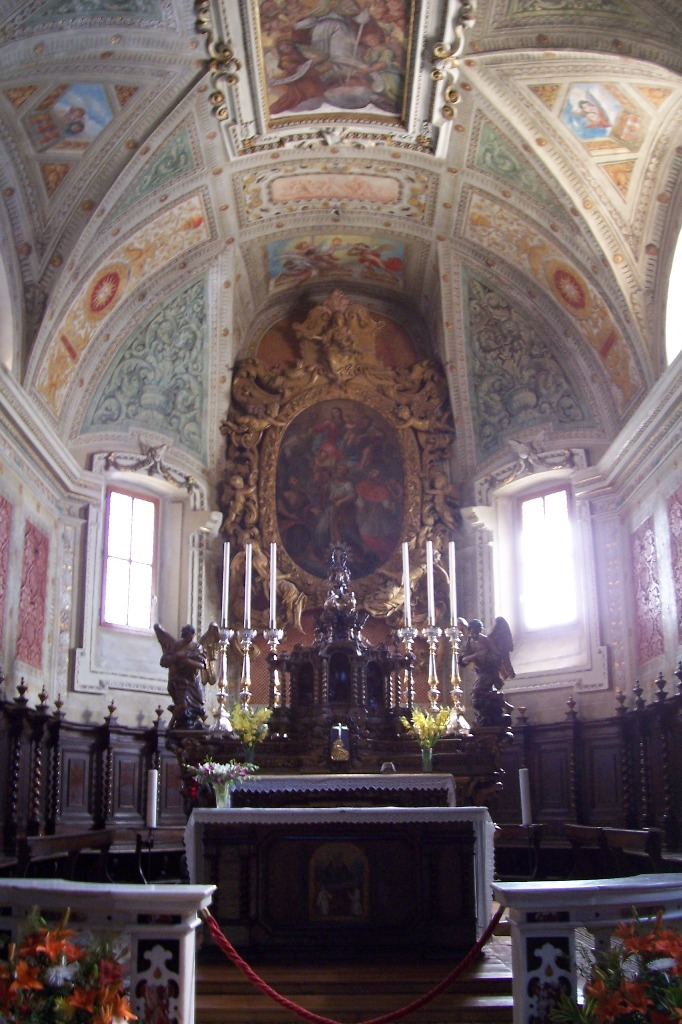
Parish of St Martin

The churches of Cerveno are:

- Parish of San Martino, 13th century, was remodeled in the 17th century. The altarpiece is of Beniamino Simoni.
- Sanctuary della Via Crucis, similar to the Sacri Monti of Piedmont and Lombardy. The chapels stand beside the parish church and oratory of San Martino. The sanctuary contains an 18th-century Via Crucis, carved of wood and stucco, and painted. the fourteen stations contain 198 life-sized statues. In 1752, Don Andrea Boldini, a parishioner commissioned the work from the local sculptor Beniamino Simoni of Fresine. However, due to continual fights with the parishioners and inhabitants, Simoni was dismissed, and the work was reassigned to Donato and Grazioso Fantoni, who completed stations 8, 9, and 10. Every ten years, the townspeople re-enact the scenes of the Passion of Christ.

== Culture ==
The scütüm are in camunian dialect nicknames, sometimes personal, elsewhere showing the characteristic features of a community. The one which characterize the people of Cerveno is Giüdé, Capèle, Brusa crus.
