= Berzo Demo =

Berzo Demo Bèrs e Dém
- Comune
- Comune di Berzo Demo
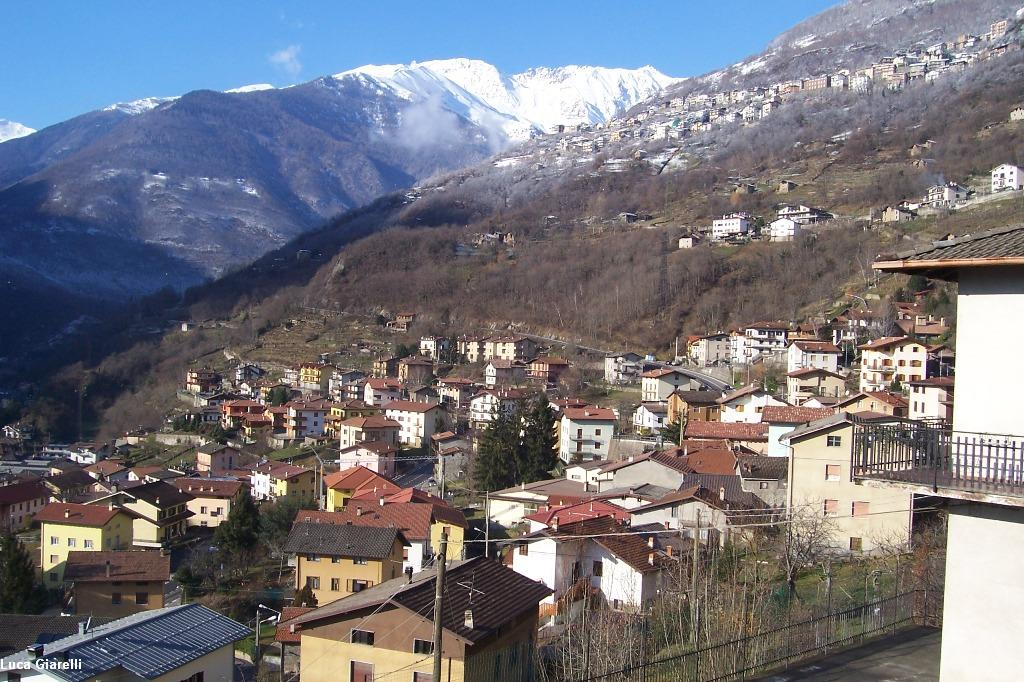
- Berzo and Demo's panorama

- Coat of arms

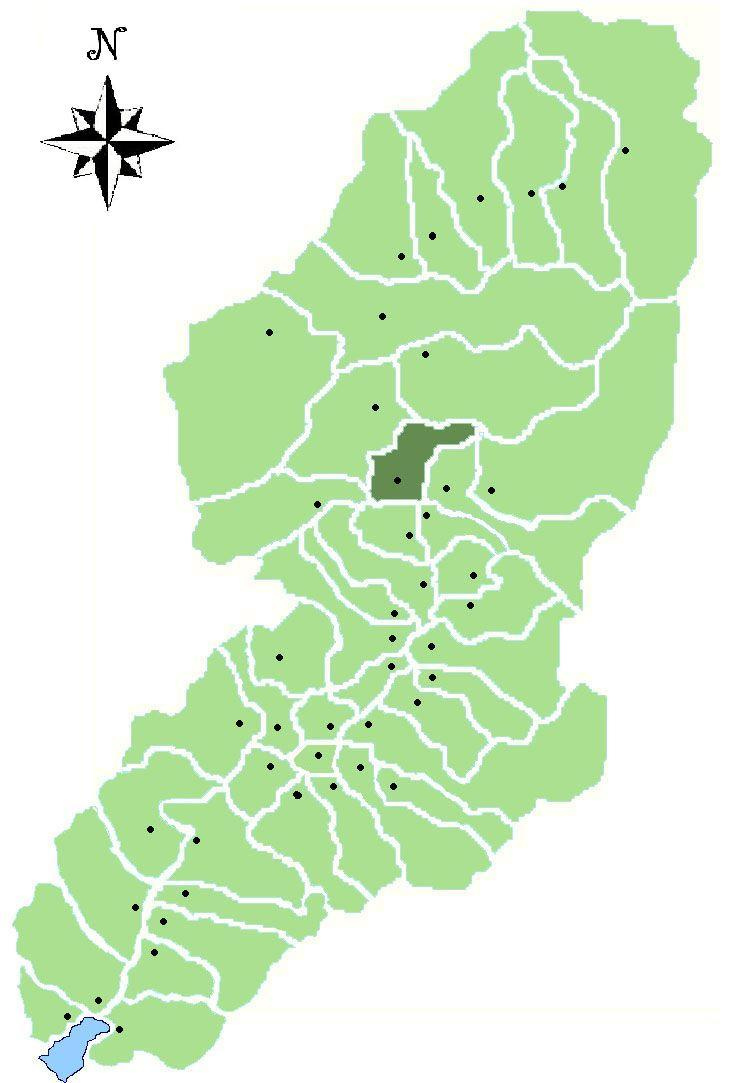

- Location within Italy Location within Lombardy
- Coordinates: 46°05′38″N 10°20′4″E
- Country: Italy
- Region: Lombardy
- Province: Brescia (BS)
- Frazioni: Berzo, Demo, Monte

Government
  - Mayor: Anna Frizzante (commissar)

Area
  - Total: 15.46 km^{2} (5.97 sq mi)

Population (30 November 2021)
  - Total: 1,527
  - Density: 98.77/km^{2} (255.8/sq mi)
- Demonym(s): Berzesi and Demesi
- Time zone: UTC+1 (CET)
  - Summer (DST): UTC+2 (CEST)
- Postal code: 25040
- Dialing code: 0364
- Patron saint: St. Eusebius of Vercelli (Berzo), St. Lawrence (Demo)
- Saint day: 2 August, 10 August
- Website: Official website

Berzo Demo (Camunian: Bèrs Dém) is an Italian comune in Val Camonica, province of Brescia, in Lombardy, northern Italy.

== Geography ==
The town of Berzo Demo is nestled on the southern slopes of the Pian della Regina. It is formed by three villages: the more downstream is Demo, the central one is Berzo and on top is Monte. It is bounded by other communes of Cedegolo, Cevo, Malonno, Paisco Loveno, Sellero, Sonico.

== History ==
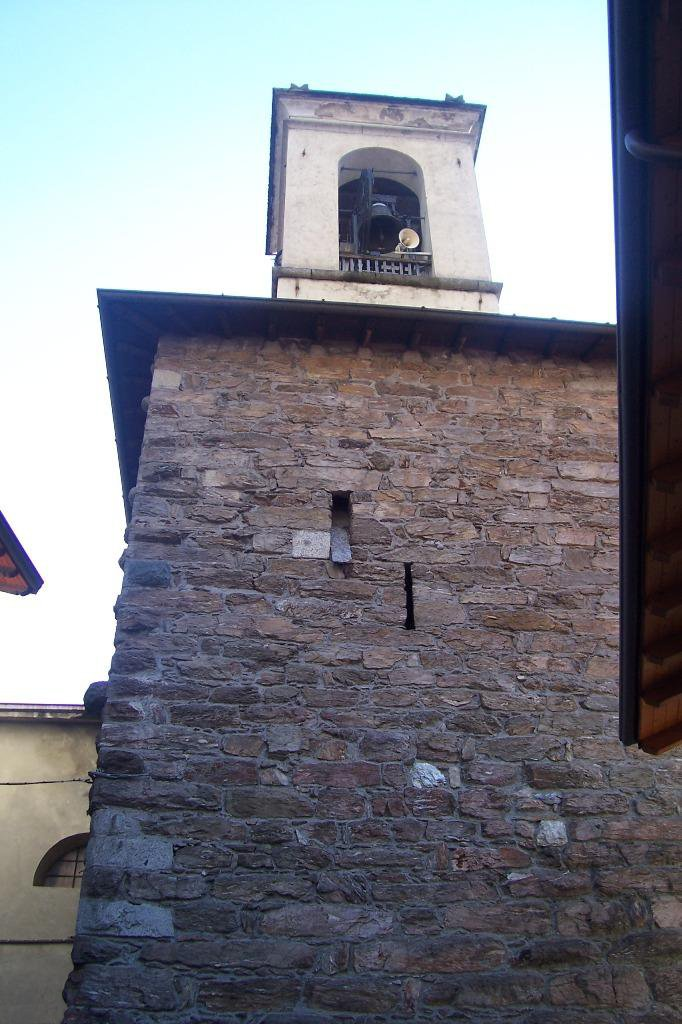
Tower-bell in Demo.

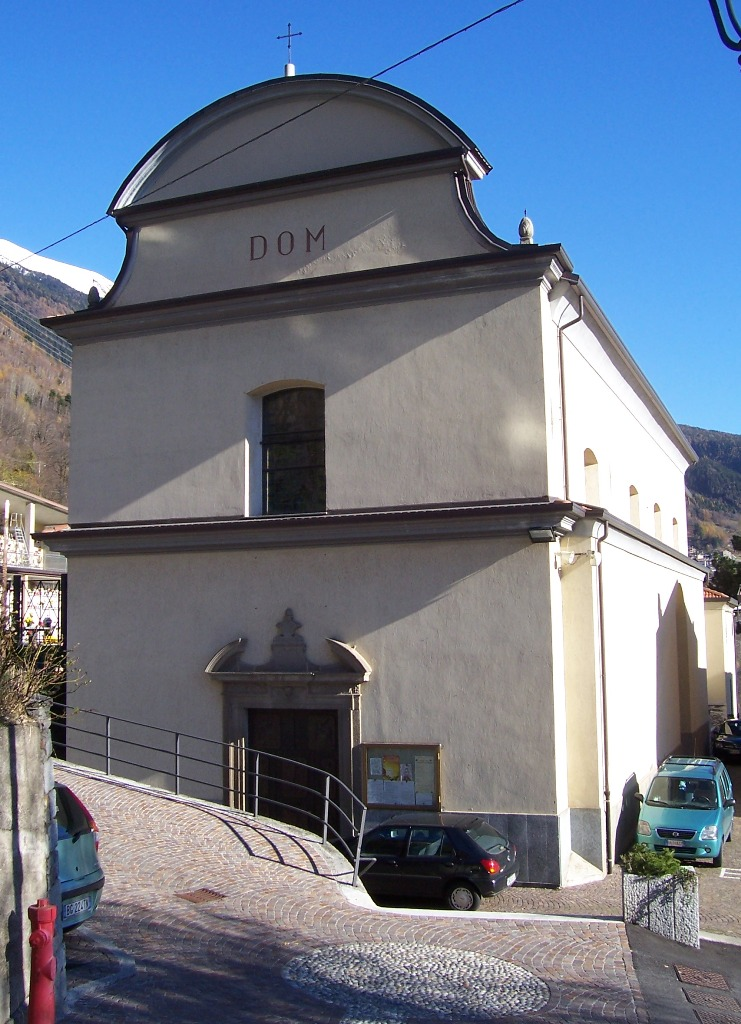
St Eusebio in Berzo.

Monday 6 April 1299, the consuls of the vicinia of Berzo and Demo go to Cemmo where is Cazoino Capriolo, Chamberlain of the Bishop of Brescia Berardo Maggi. Here swear according to the usual formula loyalty to the bishop, and pay the tithe due.

On 15 May 1365 the Bishop of Brescia Enrico Sessa invests iure feuds for a tenth of the rights in the territories of Breno, Vione, Vezza, Sonico, Malonno, Berzo Demo, Astrio, Ossimo and Losine Giovanni and Gerardo sons of Pasino Federici of Mu.

The peace of Breno of 31 December 1397, the representatives of the community of Demo, Albertino di Martino di Demo and the notary Giovannino Boldrini of Saviore, stands on the Ghibelline bank of Oglio.

On 17 September 1423 the Bishop of Brescia Francesco Marerio invests iure feuds for a 10th of the rights in the territories of Monno, Cevo, Andrist, Grumello, Saviore, Cemmo, Ono, Sonico, Astri, Malegno, Cortenedolo, Vione, Incudine and Berzo Demo at Bertolino della Torre of Cemmo.

In 1760 Berzo Demo and Monte had 790 inhabitants.

Between 1927 and 1948 (Royal Decree 28 September 1927) Berzo Demo was joint to Cedegolo.

== Main sights ==
The churches of Berzo Demo are:

- Berzo
  - Parish Church of St. Eusebius, fifteenth century in origin, extended in the seventeenth. The ancon of the high altar was made by Pietro Ramus.
- Demo
  - Parish of San Lorenzo; the portal bears the date 1757
  - Church of St. Augustine, near the bell tower, now deconsecrated. Within a tombstone dated 1640.
  - Church of San Zeno, on a small hill at the foot of the commune, is of the sixteenth century. It has a triangular tower-bell.
  - Church dedicated to Saint Valentine (or "of the Dead"): Until a few years ago it was covered with votive offerings (ex voto), especially anatomical ones (legs, feet, hands).
- The bell tower of 1865 stands on the ruins of a medieval tower-house

== Culture ==
The scütüm are in camunian dialect nicknames, sometimes personal, elsewhere showing the characteristic features of a community. The one which characterize the people of

- Berzo is Bersàgoi
- Demo is Gòs
- Monte is Gàcc

On 28 June, the eve of feast of Saints Peter and Paul, the villagers put an egg white in a bottle which they leave in the open air until the next morning; albumin coagulated in filaments then evokes the masts and sails of a boat, it is the boat of Saint Peter.

== Sources ==
- Baccanelli, Boldini; Moreschi, Ruggeri (2003). Bercio - storia religiosa e civile del comune di Berzo Demo (in Italian). Breno: Tipografia camuna.
