= Monte Elto =

Mountain in Italy

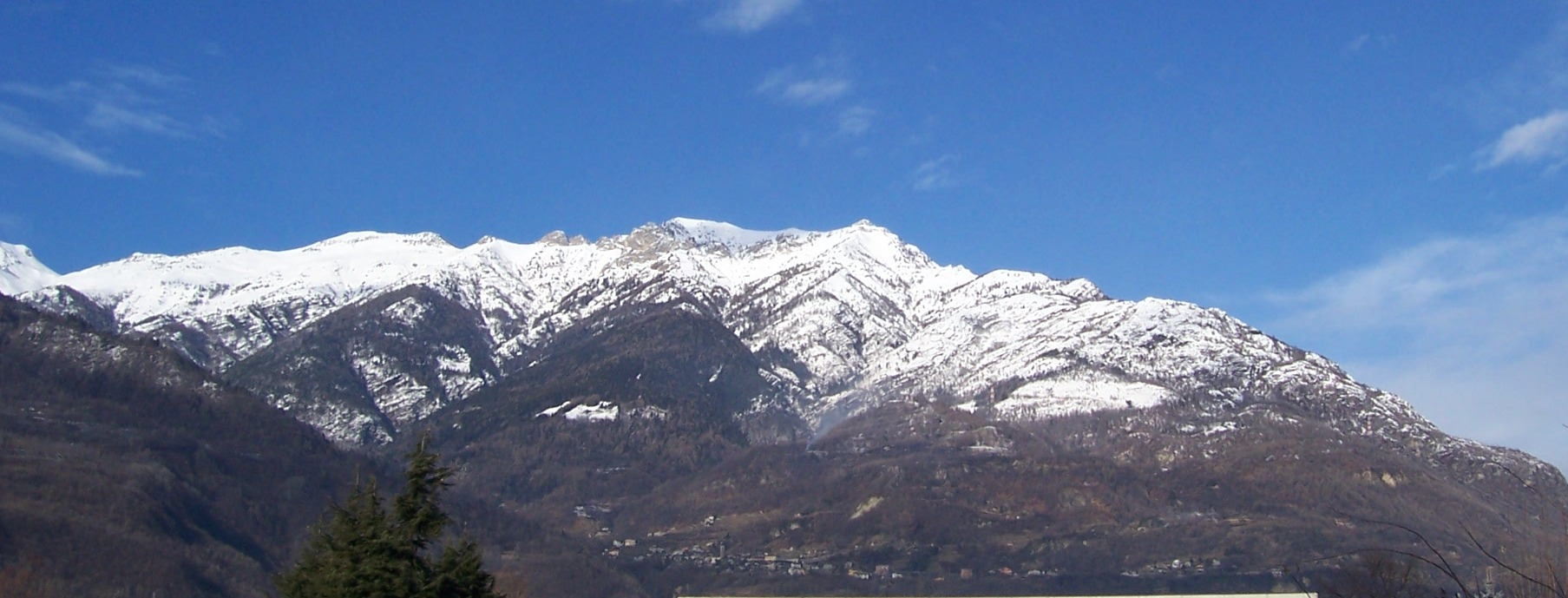

Highest point
- Elevation: 2,145 m (7,037 ft)
- Coordinates: 46°03′21.41″N 10°17′55.49″E

Geography
- Location within Italy
- Location: Lombardy, Italy
- Parent range: Bergamo Alps

Monte Elto is a mountain in Lombardy, Italy. It is located within the Bergamo Alps.

== Toponym ==
According to some interpretations, the name Elto derives from the Venetian term Elt which means high.

== Geography ==
Mount Elto is located on the western side of Val Camonica, north of the Concarena and in front of mount Adamello. Its territory belongs to the municipalities of Sellero and Capo di Ponte.

The southern side is lapped by the Clegna stream, the northern one by the Allione stream. The Re di Sellero stream flows on the eastern side. All these waterways are tributaries of the Oglio.

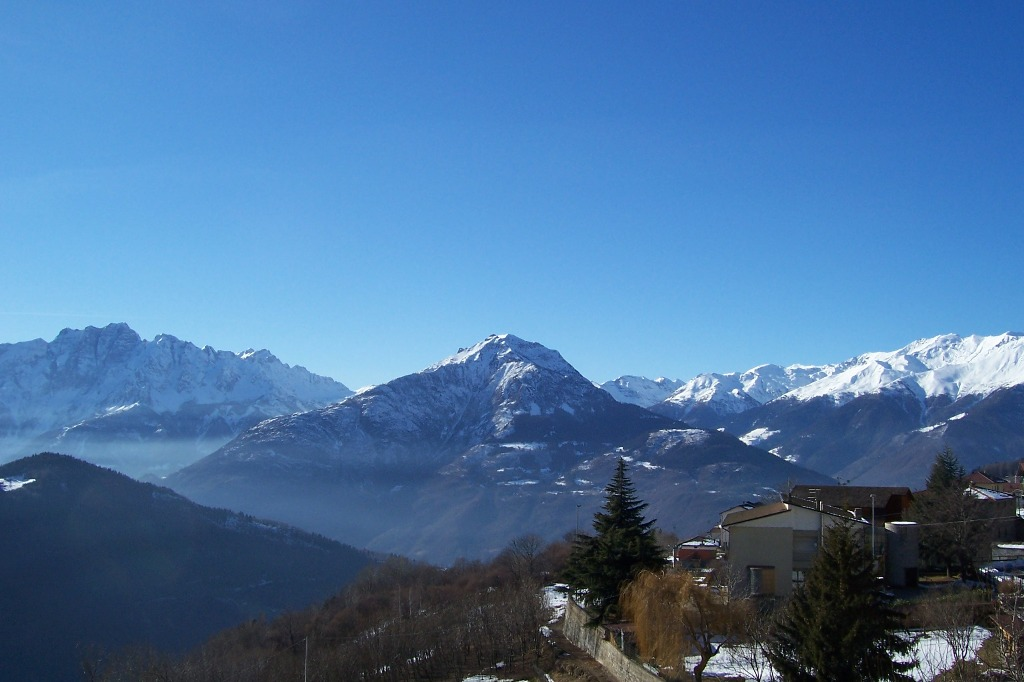
Monte Elto seen from Cevo (winter)

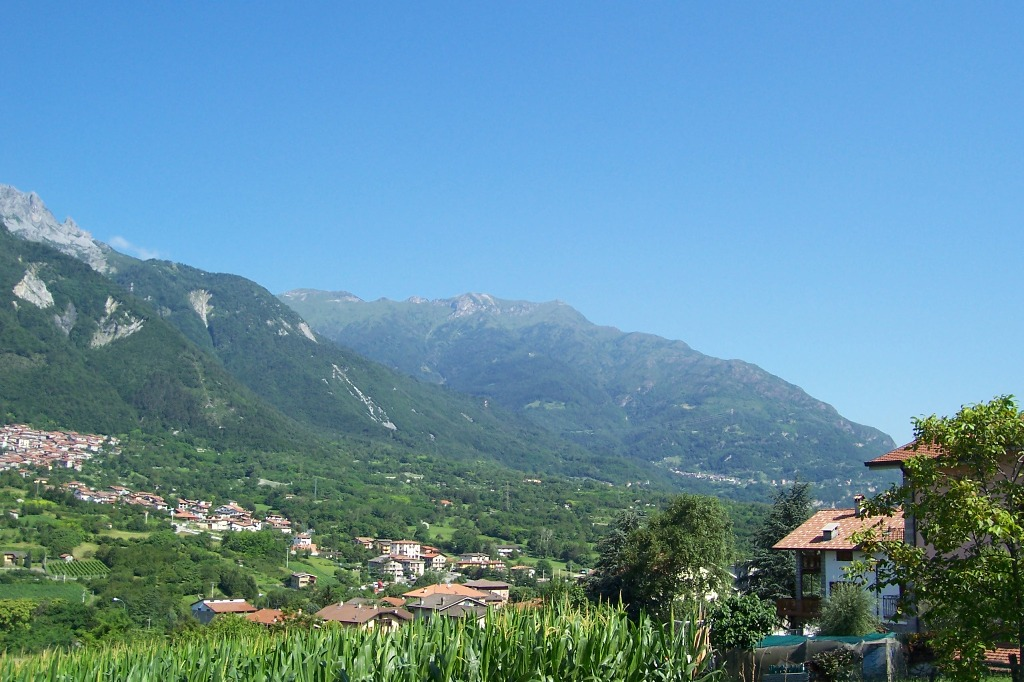
Monte Elto seen from Braone (summer)

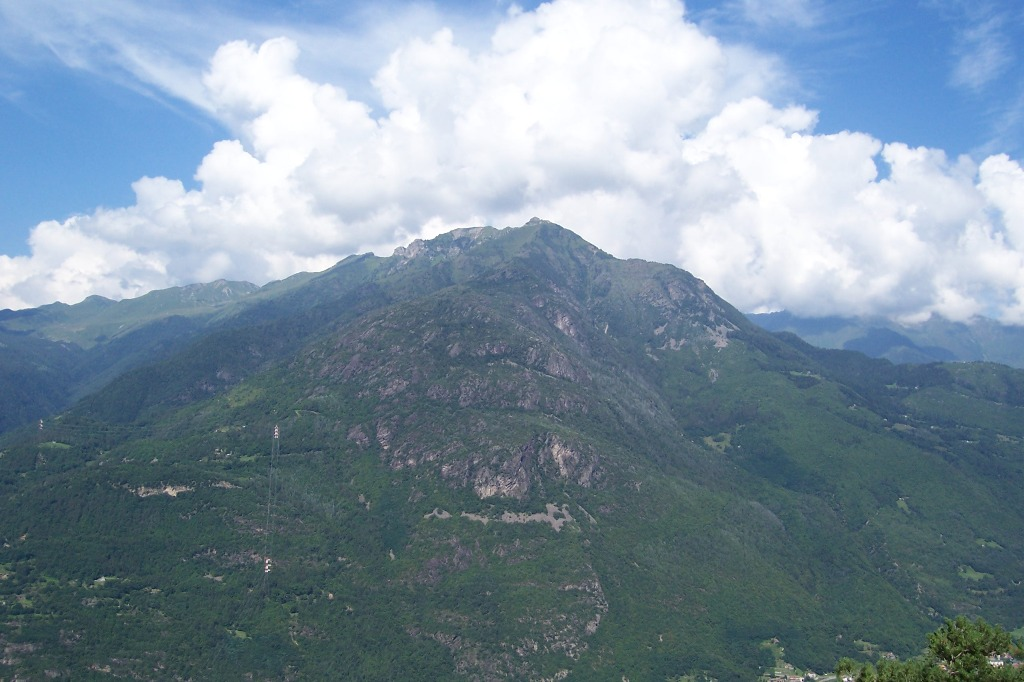
Monte Elto seen from Paspardo (summer)
