= Frigidolfo =

Coordinates: 46°15′33″N 10°30′29″E

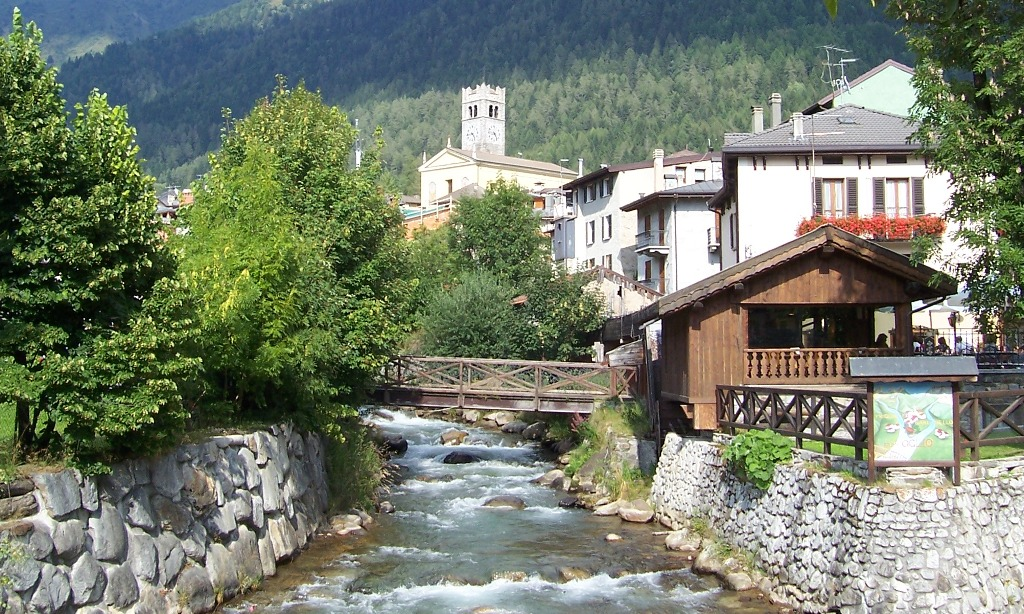

Location
- Country: Italy

Physical characteristics
- Source: Valle delle Messi
  - elevation: 3035 m a.s.l
- Length: 7 km (4.3 mi)

Basin features
- Tributaries
  - left: Arcanello near Pezzo, commune of Ponte di Legno

The Frigidolfo (also called Oglio Frigidolfo) is a stream of Val Camonica, in the province of Brescia, about 7 km long.

It rises in the Valle delle Messi, near the Gavia Pass on the slopes of the Corno dei Tre Signori (3360 m a.s.l.).

Along its path it receives water from the Arcanello.

Its confluence with the Narcanello in Ponte di Legno (1300 m a.s.l.) gives rise to the Oglio River.
