= Elto =

Elto or ELTO may refer to:

== People ==
- Max Elto, Swedish vocal duo

== Places ==
- Monte Elto, Italy

== Other ==
- ELTO, American engine manufacturer
