= Malonno =

Malonno Malòn
- Comune
- Comune di Malonno
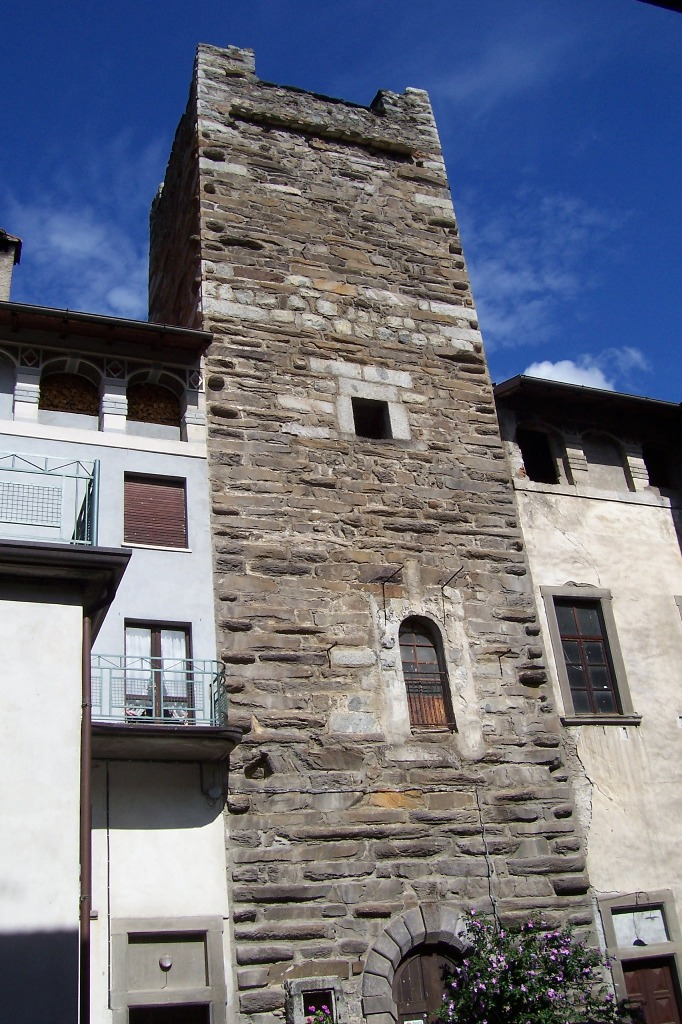
- A tower house in Malonno.

- Coat of arms

- Location within Italy Location within Lombardy
- Coordinates: 46°07′N 10°19′E
- Country: Italy
- Region: Lombardy
- Province: Brescia (BS)
- Frazioni: Landò, Lava, Loritto, Moscio, Nazio, Odecla, Zazza

Government
  - Mayor: Giovanni Ghirardi

Area
  - Total: 31.46 km^{2} (12.15 sq mi)
- Elevation: 596 m (1,955 ft)

Population (30 November 2021)
  - Total: 3,025
  - Density: 96.15/km^{2} (249.0/sq mi)
- Time zone: UTC+1 (CET)
  - Summer (DST): UTC+2 (CEST)
- Postal code: 25040
- Dialing code: 0364
- Patron saint: Santi Faustino e Giovita
- Saint day: 15 febbraio
- Website: Official website

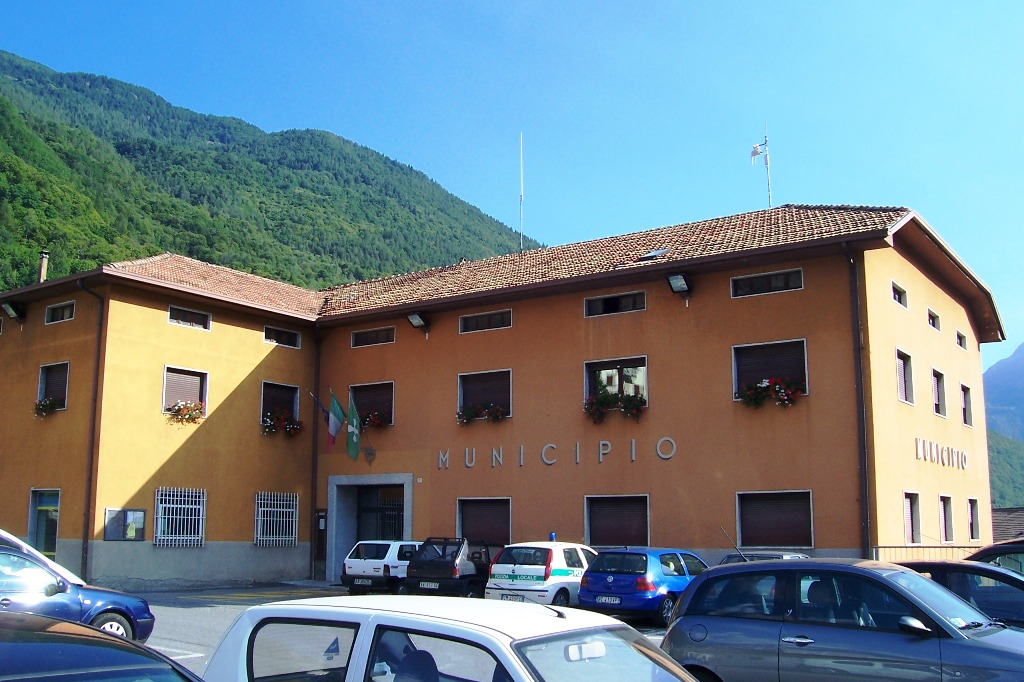
The Town Hall.

Malonno (Camunian: Malòn) is a town and comune in the province of Brescia, in Lombardy, northern Italy. Neighbouring communes are Berzo Demo, Paisco Loveno and Sonico. It is located on the right bank of the river Oglio, in the Val Camonica.
