= Sellero =

Sellero Hèlar
- Comune
- Comune di Sellero
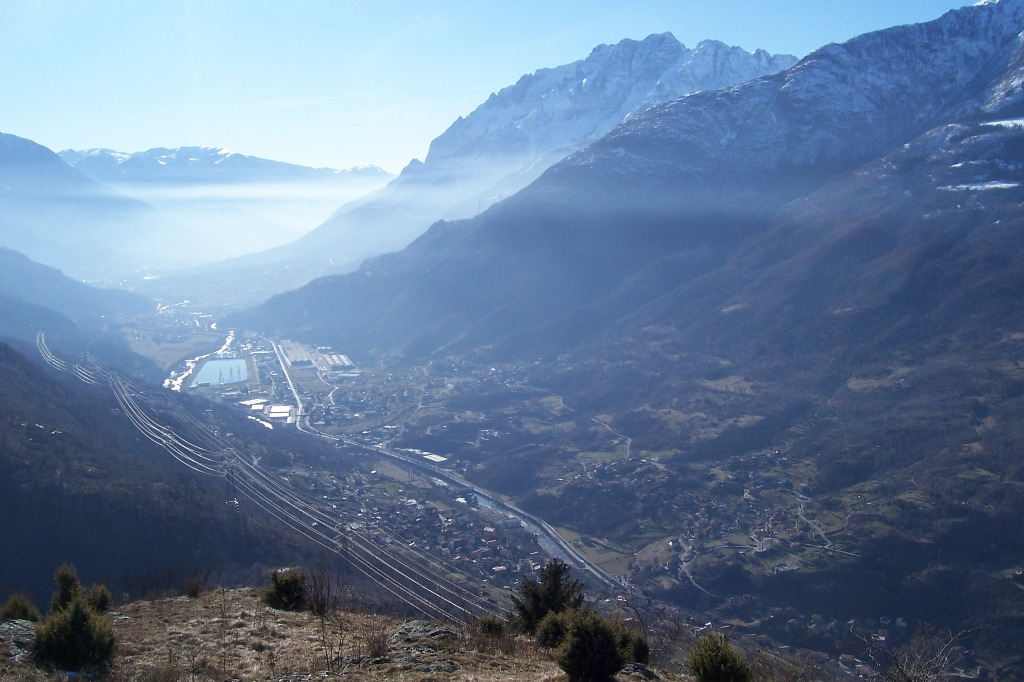
- Sellero's panorama

- Location within Italy Location within Lombardy
- Coordinates: 46°3′21″N 10°20′52″E
- Country: Italy
- Region: Lombardy
- Province: Brescia (BS)
- Frazioni: Novelle

Government
  - Mayor: Mattia Peluchetti

Area
  - Total: 13.9 km^{2} (5.4 sq mi)
- Elevation: 376 m (1,234 ft)

Population (2011)
  - Total: 1,501
  - Density: 108/km^{2} (280/sq mi)
- Demonym: Selleresi
- Time zone: UTC+1 (CET)
  - Summer (DST): UTC+2 (CEST)
- Postal code: 25050
- Dialing code: 0364
- Patron saint: Santa Maria Assunta and San Desiderio
- Saint day: August 15 and May 15
- Website: Official website

Sellero (Camunian: Hèler; locally Hèlar) is a comune of 1,503 people in the province of Brescia (far 83 km from Brescia) in the middle Val Camonica.

In its territory there are thousands of rock engravings, including the "Rosa camuna" in Carpene (which is the symbol of Lombardy region). In the comune's territory there are also examples of energy excellence, such as the San Fiorano's underground hydroelectric power (in Scianica) and a biomass tele-heating power.

The comune consists of the settlements of Sellero (the most important of the comune) and the frazione of Novelle. Another settlement is Scianica, situated in the valley floor and developed in the 1970s and 1980s.

== Geography ==
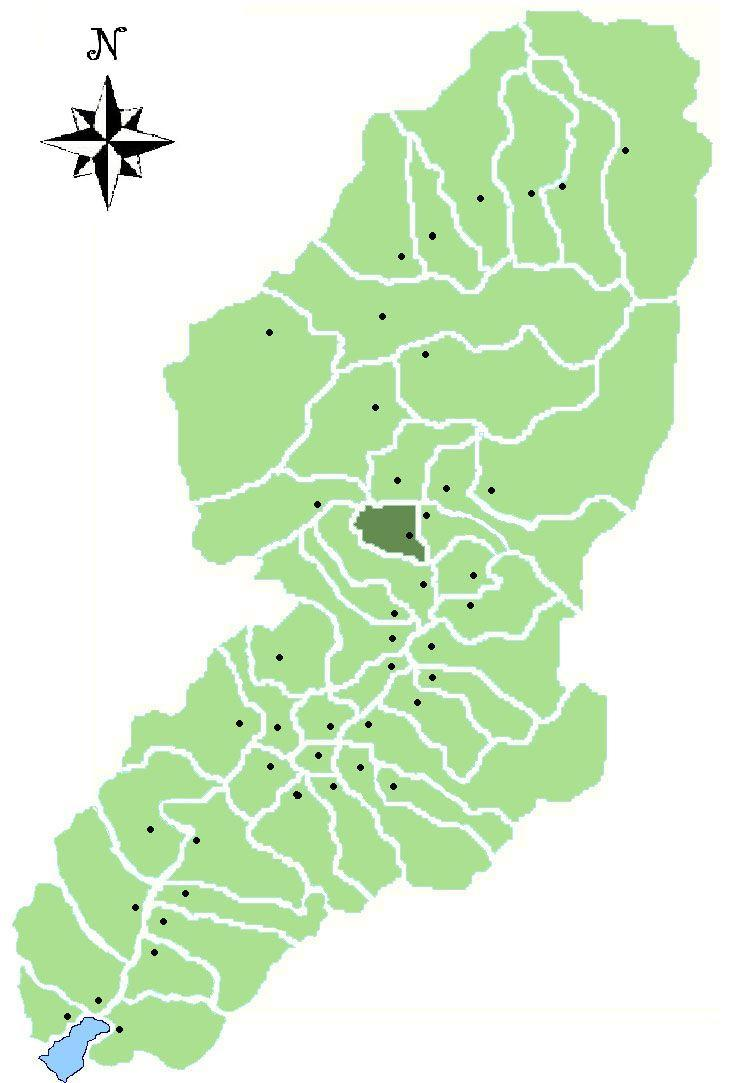
Location of Sellero in Val Camonica

The commune is situated in the middle Val Camonica, on the right bank of the river Oglio. Neighbouring communes are Berzo Demo, Capo di Ponte, Cedegolo and Paisco Loveno. The highest point is Monte Elto, which is 2,145 metres high.

== History ==
There are traces of Camunnic settlements around Sellero, dating back to the Bronze Age. During the Roman era, the area was sparsely populated. It was repopulated during the Middle Ages. Recently, from 1927 to 1948 the commune joined with Cedegolo, a neighbouring commune.

== Population trends, 1861–2001 ==
| Year | Population |
|---|---|
| 1861 | 795 |
| 1871 | 833 |
| 1881 | 907 |
| 1901 | 902 |
| 1911 | 1,054 |
| 1921 | 1,125 |
| 1931 | 1,202 |
| 1936 | 1,206 |
| 1951 | 1,481 |
| 1961 | 1,548 |
| 1971 | 1,559 |
| 1981 | 1,561 |
| 1991 | 1,508 |
| 2001 | 1,475 |
| 2011 | 1,501 |

Source: ISTAT

== Interesting places ==
Sellero with its church and townhall

The two churches of the town, the parish church (Saint Mary) and the ancient church (Saint Desiderio) present some interesting artistic works.

The parish church, finished in 1785, presents an interesting altar in Sicily's and Verona's marble and a portal in Vezza d'Oglio's marble. Also the ancient church, erected by Frankish, can be visited and presents some Pietro di Cemmo's frescos.

Near the frazione of Novelle there are the Carona's mines, which can be visited with equipment for speleology.

== Economy ==
Sellero, from 1950 to 1980, was an important industrial town in Valle Camonica, thank to the Scianica's little plain.

The first activity started in 1907 when the Curletti company began the utilization of Carona's mine for the sulphur's mining, and finished in 1951.

With the mines' utilization some people founded the SEFE (Società Esercizio Forni Elettrici, in English Society for the management of electric furnaces) which built three furnaces for the calcium carbide's production.

Now the first activity is an iron factory, Riva Acciaio (Riva Iron).
