= Corno dei Tre Signori =

Mountain in Italy

Coordinates: 46°21′N 10°31′E

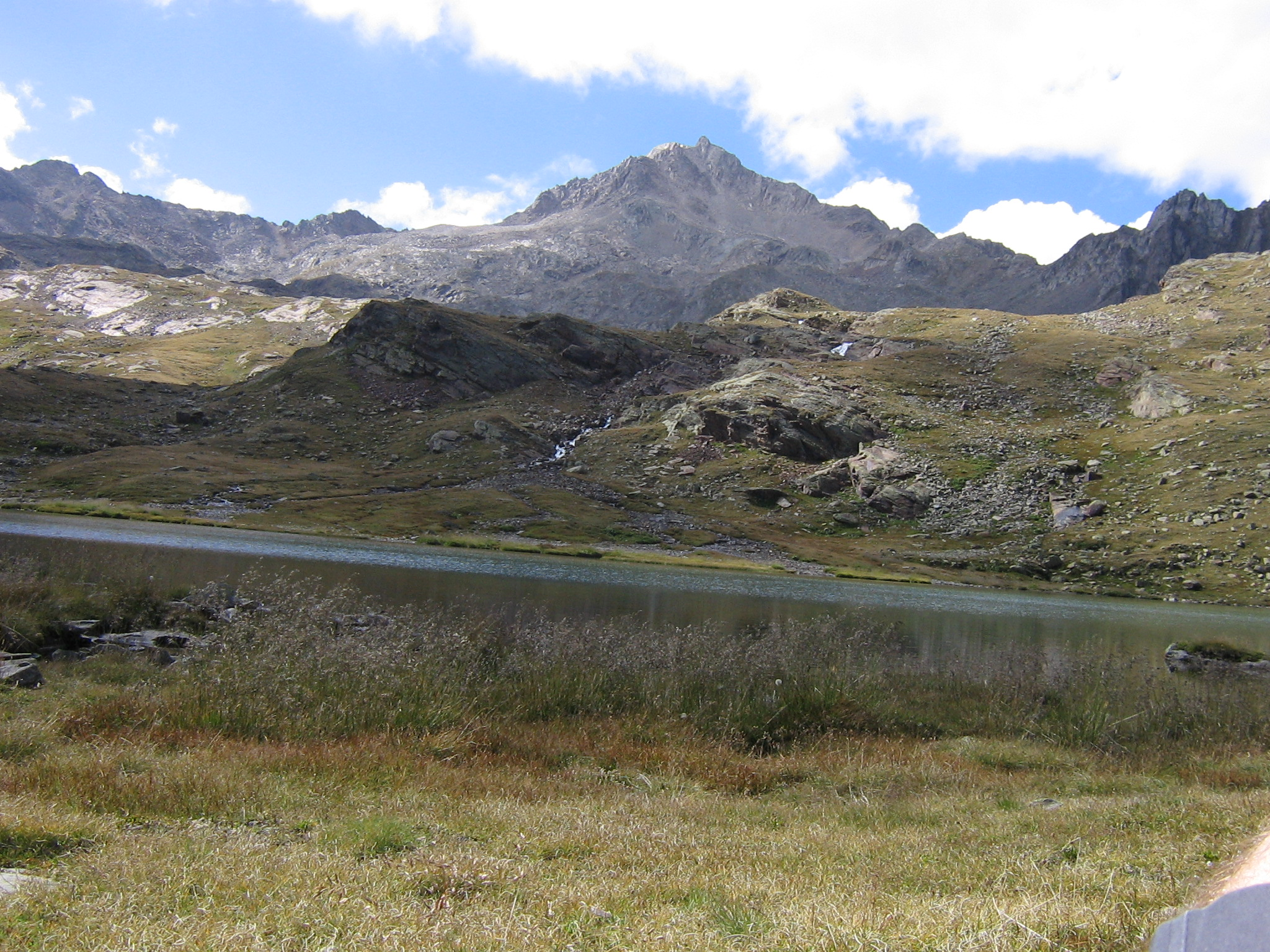

Highest point
- Elevation: 3,360 m (11,020 ft)
- Prominence: 366 m (1,201 ft)
- Listing: Alpine mountains above 3000 m

Geography
- Location: Lombardy, Italy
- Parent range: Ortler Alps

Corno dei Tre Signori is a mountain in Lombardy, Italy. The Oglio and Noce rivers originate there.
