= Ponte di Legno =

Ponte di Legno Put de Lègn
- Comune
- Comune di Ponte di Legno
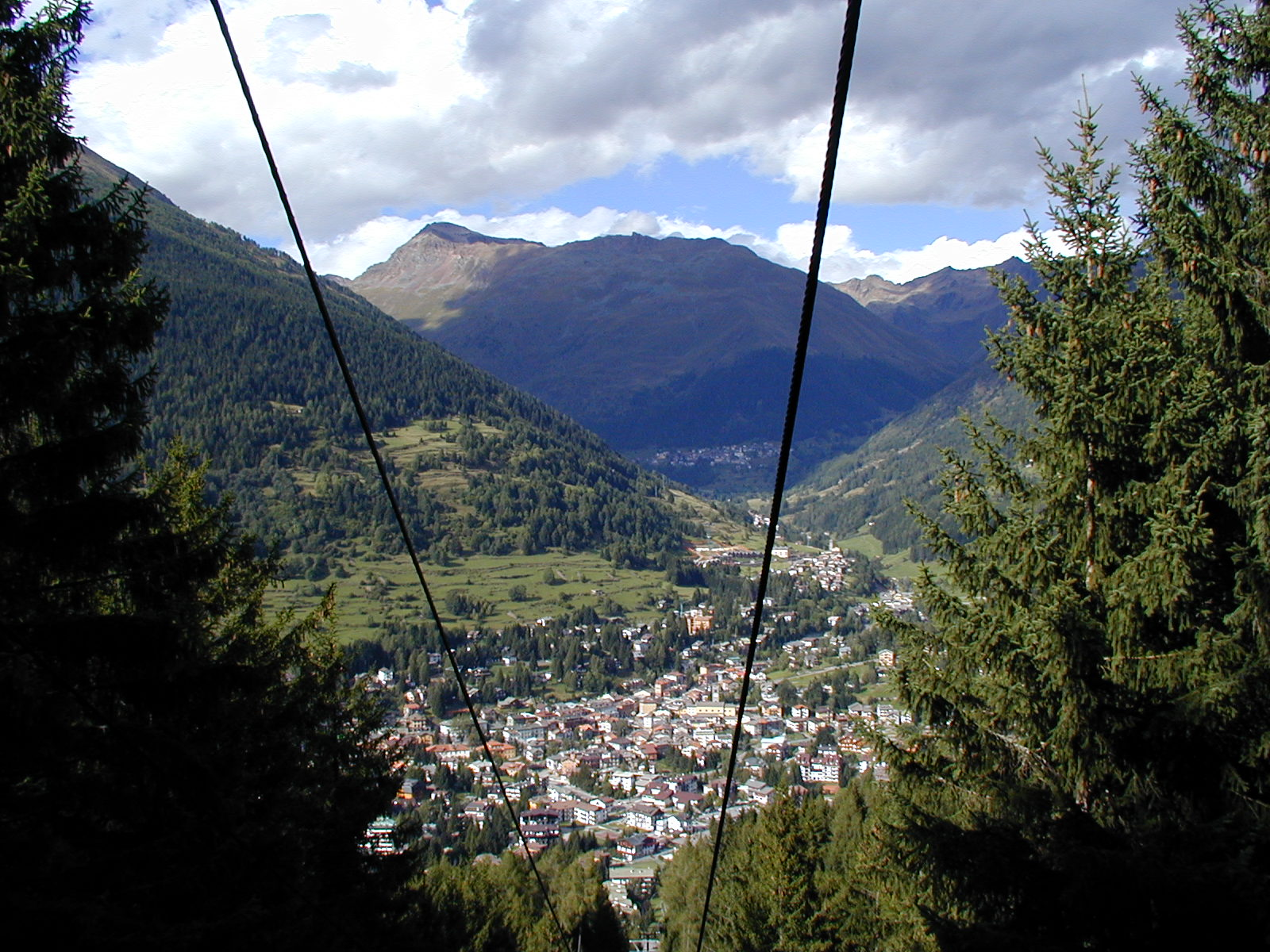

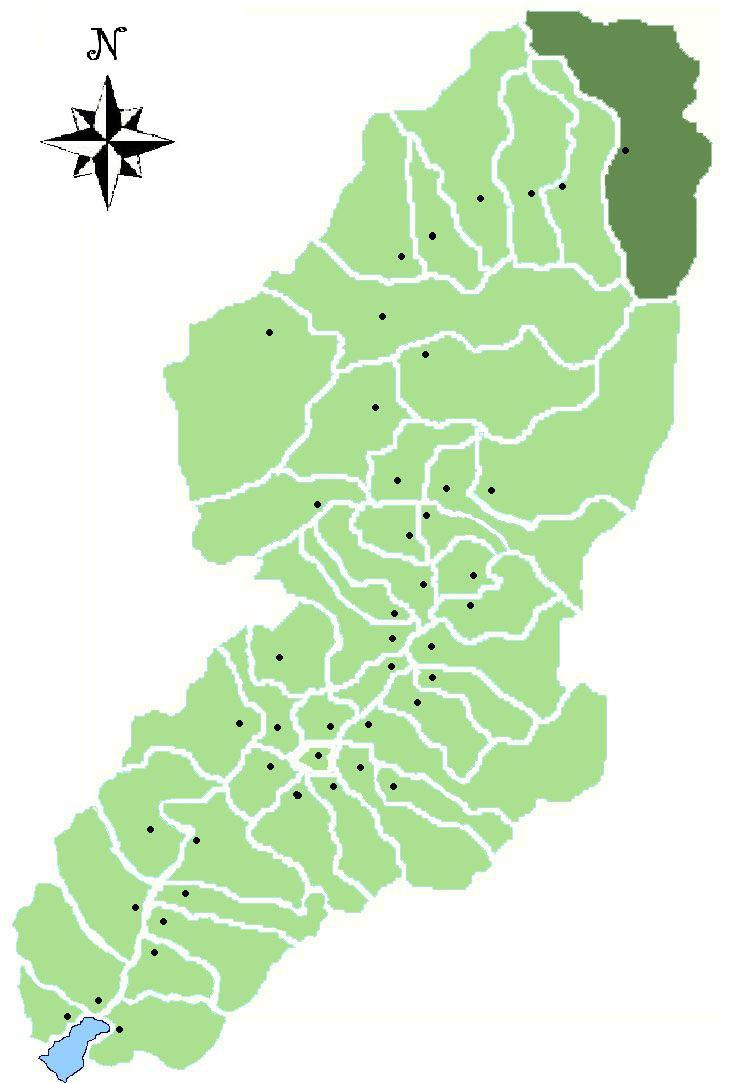

- Location within Italy Location within Lombardy
- Coordinates: 46°15′34″N 10°30′34″E
- Country: Italy
- Region: Lombardy
- Province: Province of Brescia (BS)
- Frazioni: Poia, Zoanno, Precasaglio, Passo del Tonale, S.Apollonia, Pezzo

Government
  - Mayor: Ivan Faustinelli (PD)

Area
  - Total: 100.1 km^{2} (38.6 sq mi)
- Elevation: 1,258 m (4,127 ft)

Population (31-12-2015)
  - Total: 1,729
  - Density: 17.27/km^{2} (44.74/sq mi)
- Demonym: Dalignesi
- Time zone: UTC+1 (CET)
  - Summer (DST): UTC+2 (CEST)
- Postal code: 25056
- Dialing code: 0364
- Patron saint: SS. Trinità
- Saint day: 5 June
- Website: Official website

Ponte di Legno (Camunian: Put de Lègn) is an Italian comune of 1,729 inhabitants in Val Camonica, province of Brescia, in Lombardy.

== Geography ==
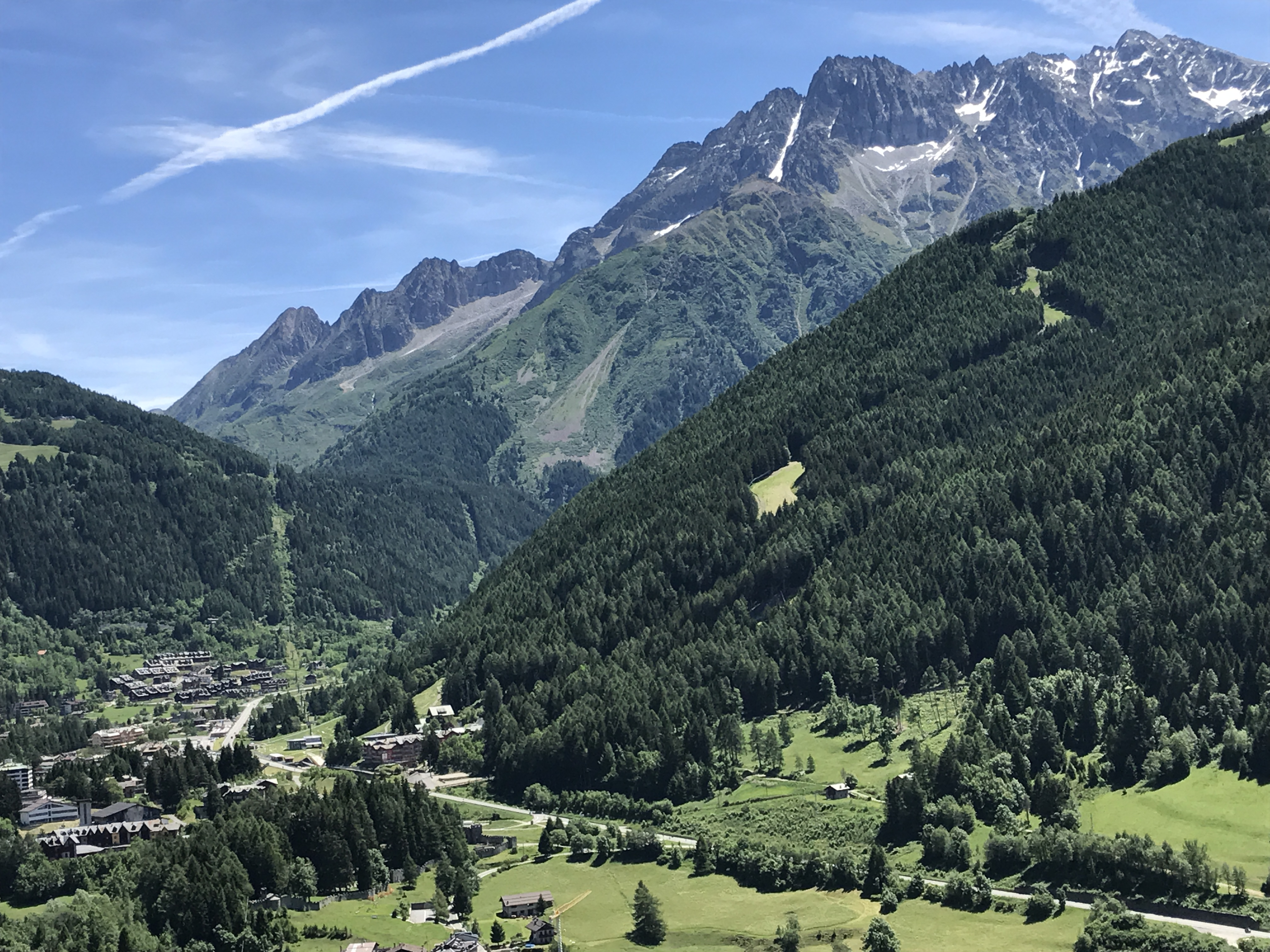
Ponte di Legno in spring

Situated at the confluence of the two source rivers (Frigidolfo and Narcanello) of the Oglio, Ponte di Legno is the uppermost comune of Valle Camonica.

== History ==
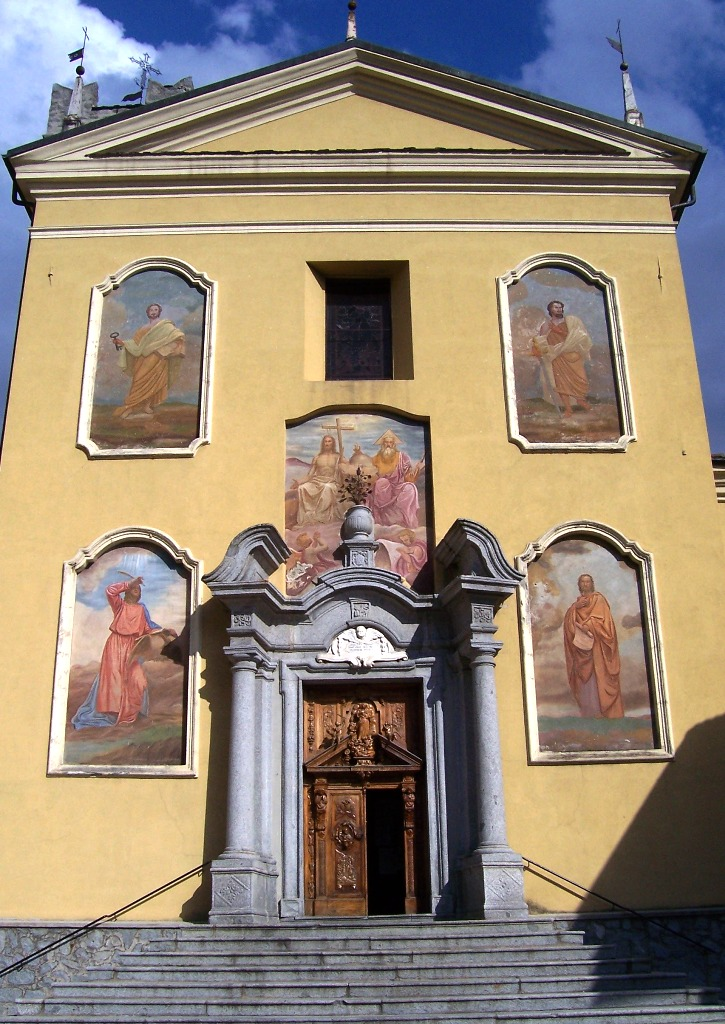
Parish church of the Holy Trinity

The territory of the municipality of Ponte di Legno was part of the ancient Dalaunia (Dalegno), which included also the comune of Temù.

On September 27, 1917 the village was bombarded by Austrian cannons and razed to the ground in a short time.

== Monuments and places of interest ==
=== Religious architectures ===
The churches of Ponte di Legno are:

- Parish of the Holy Trinity, dated 1685, though the wooden door is from 1929. Inside there are works from the workshop of Ramus.
- Church St. Appollonio in Plampezzo. It is an ancient church dating from the twelfth century, with frescoes of the thirteenth century of the hand of the painter Johannes from Volpino.

== Society ==
=== Traditions and folklore ===
The scütüm are in camunian dialect nicknames, sometimes personal, elsewhere showing the characteristic features of a community. The ones which characterize the people of the comune are:

- Poia: Bòrse
- Zoanno: Gòs
- Pezzo: Benui
- Precasaglio: Berlif

== Twin towns ==
Ponte di Legno is twinned with:

- Recco, Italy
