= Lozio =

Lozio Lóh
- Comune
- Comune di Lozio
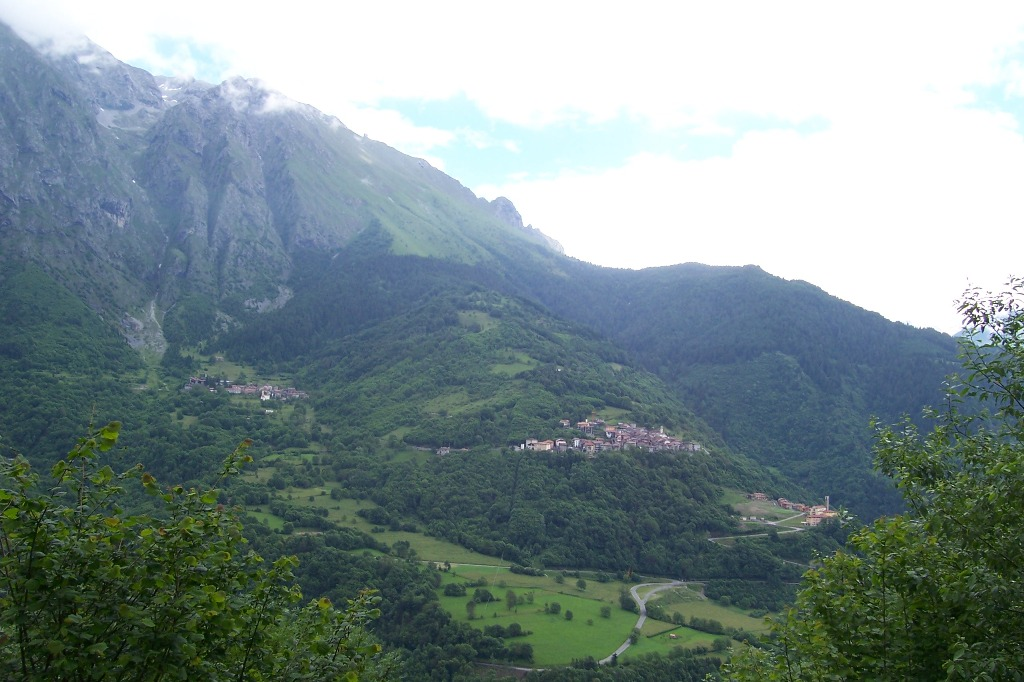
- Lozio

- Location within Italy Location within Lombardy
- Coordinates: 45°59′11″N 10°15′43″E
- Country: Italy
- Region: Lombardy
- Province: Brescia (BS)
- Frazioni: Laveno, Sucinva, Sommaprada e Villa

Area
  - Total: 23 km^{2} (8.9 sq mi)
- Elevation: 975 m (3,199 ft)

Population (2011)
  - Total: 429
  - Density: 19/km^{2} (48/sq mi)
- Time zone: UTC+1 (CET)
  - Summer (DST): UTC+2 (CEST)
- Postal code: 25040
- Dialing code: 0364
- Patron saint: San Nazaro e Celso (Laveno), Santi Pietro e Paolo (Villa)
- Saint day: 29 giugno
- Website: Official website

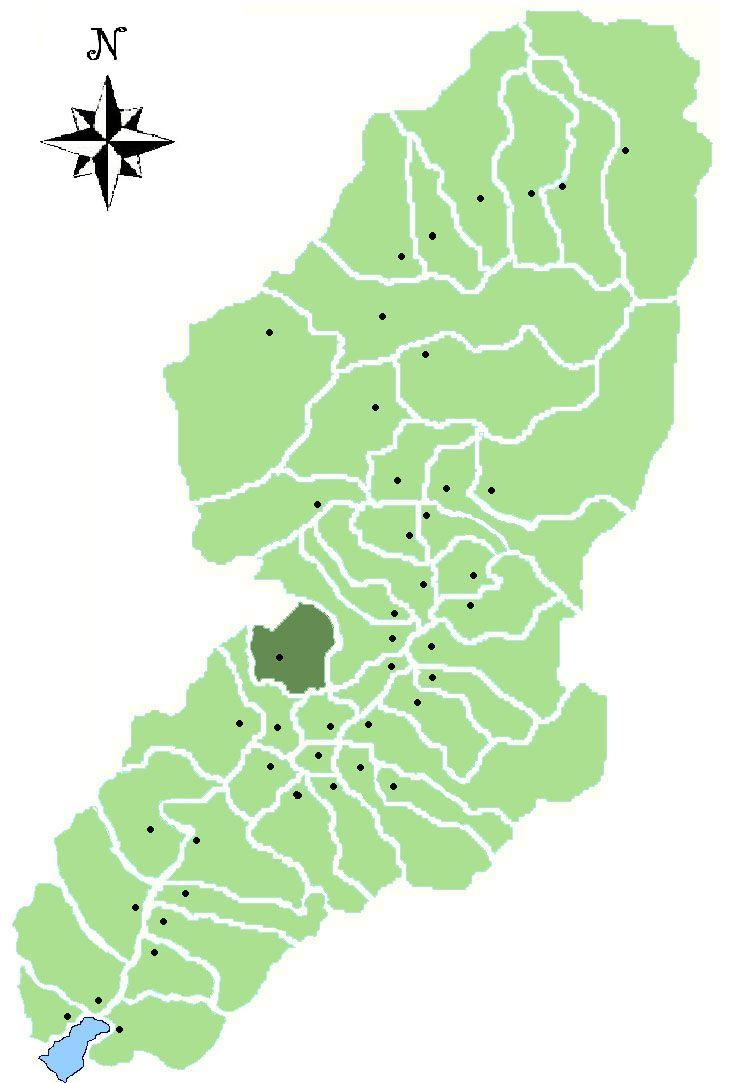
Location of Lozio in Val Camonica

Lozio (Camunian: Lóh) is a town and comune in the province of Brescia, in Lombardy. Neighbouring communes are Cerveno, Malegno, Ossimo and Schilpario (BG).

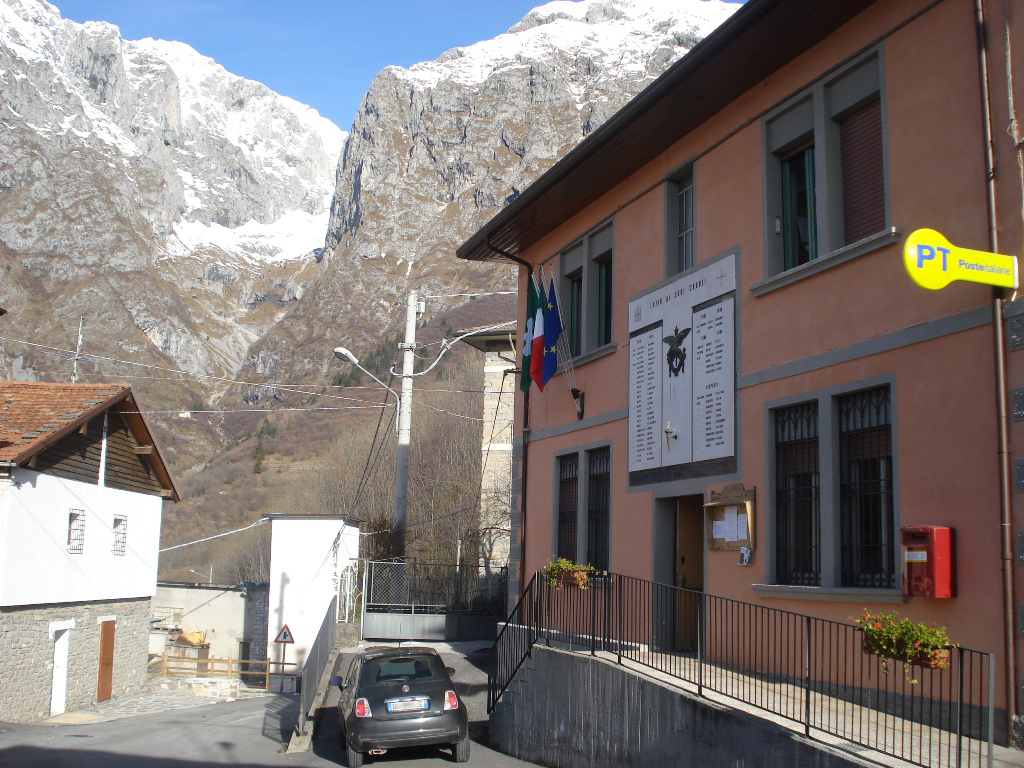
the Town Hall
