= Ono San Pietro =

Ono San Pietro Dò
- Comune
- Comune di Ono San Pietro
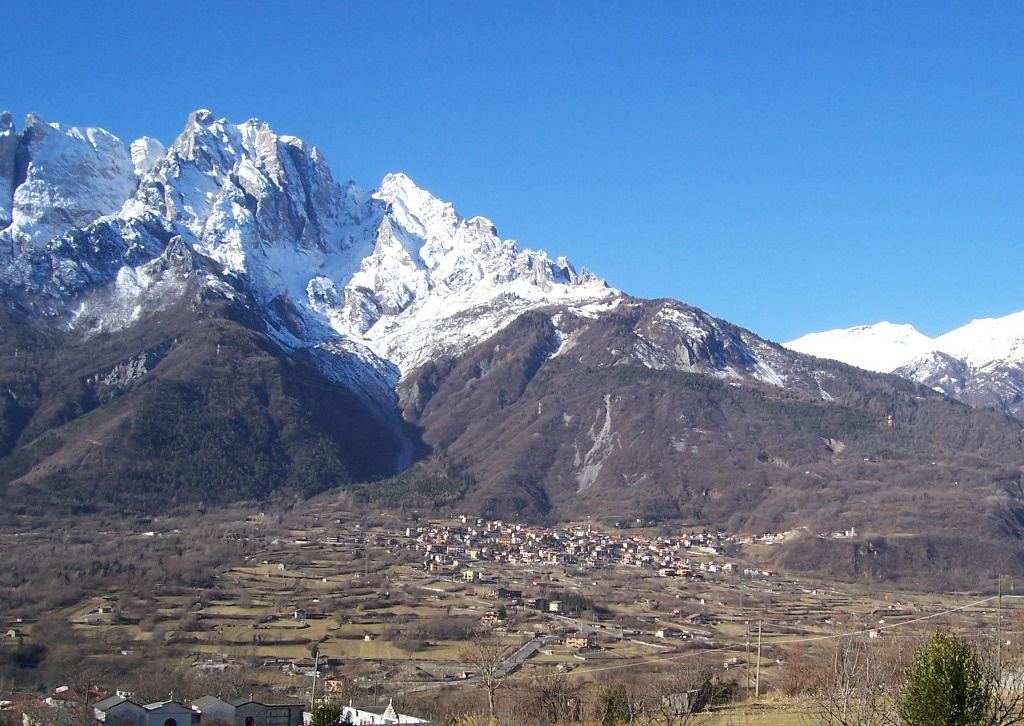
- Panorama of Ono San Pietro

- Location within Italy Location within Lombardy
- Coordinates: 46°01′04″N 10°19′45″E
- Country: Italy
- Region: Lombardy
- Province: Province of Brescia (BS)

Area
  - Total: 13.94 km^{2} (5.38 sq mi)
- Elevation: 516 m (1,693 ft)

Population (2011)
  - Total: 998
  - Density: 71.6/km^{2} (185/sq mi)
- Demonym: Onesi
- Time zone: UTC+1 (CET)
  - Summer (DST): UTC+2 (CEST)
- Postal code: 25050
- Dialing code: 0364
- Patron saint: Sant'Alessandro
- Website: Official website

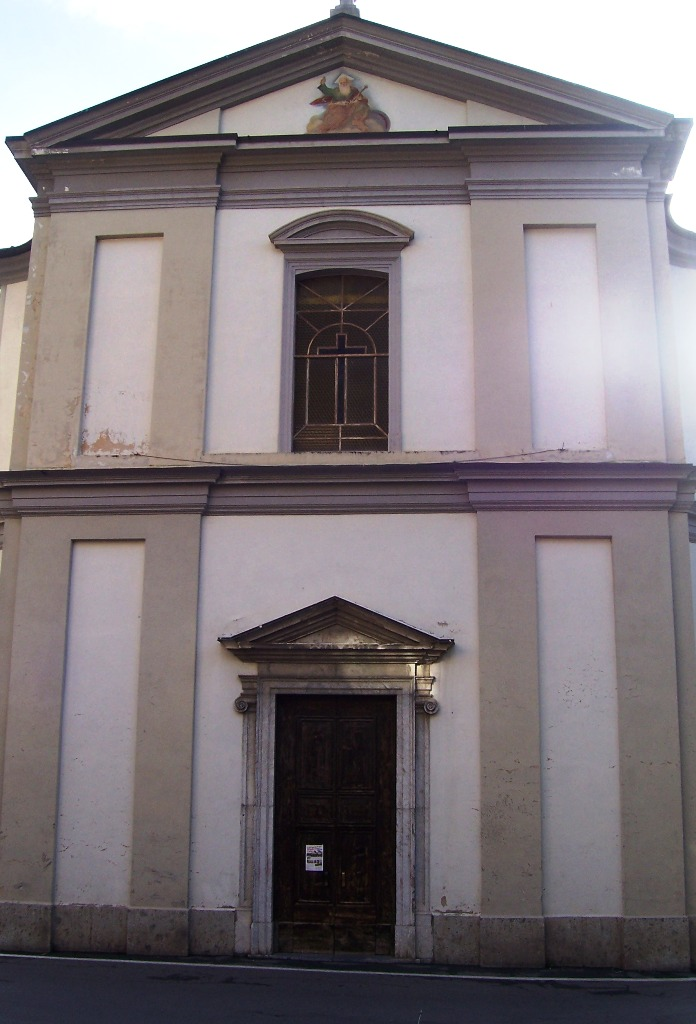
Parish Church

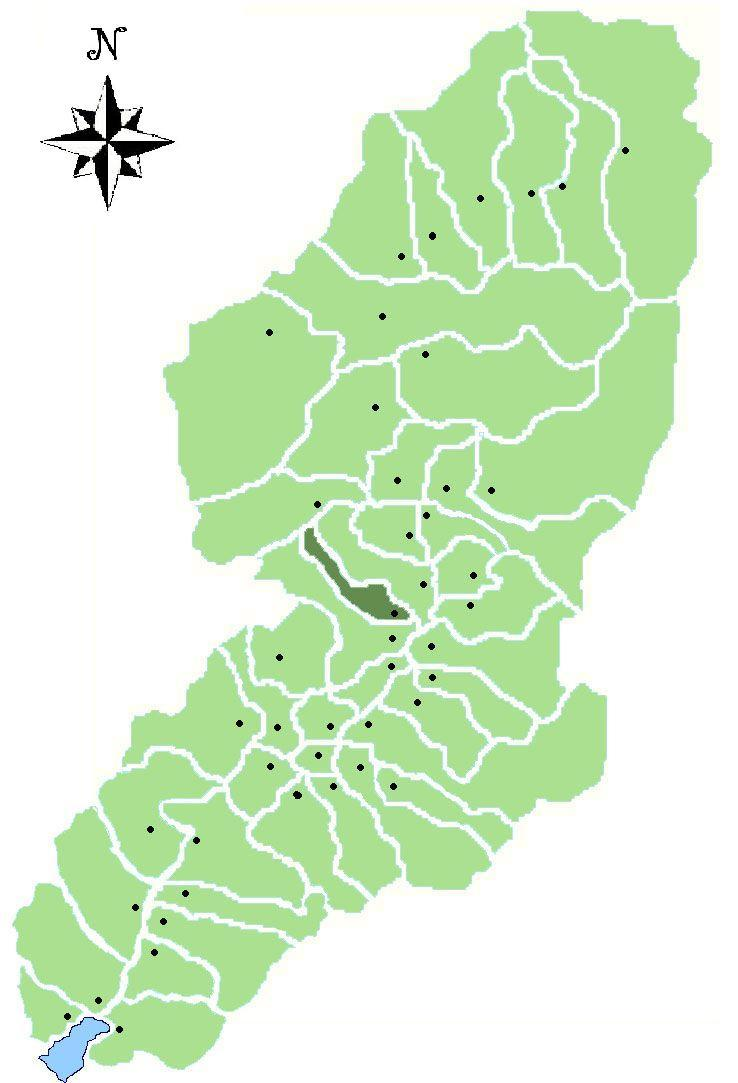
Location of Ono San Pietro in Val Camonica

Ono San Pietro (Camunian: Dò) is a town and comune in the province of Brescia, in Lombardy. It is located in the Camonica valley, above the right bank of the river Oglio, and at the foot of Mt. Concarena. Neighbouring communes are Capo di Ponte, Cerveno, Ceto and Paisco Loveno.
