= Piancogno =

Piancogno Piàcógn
- Comune
- Comune di Piancogno
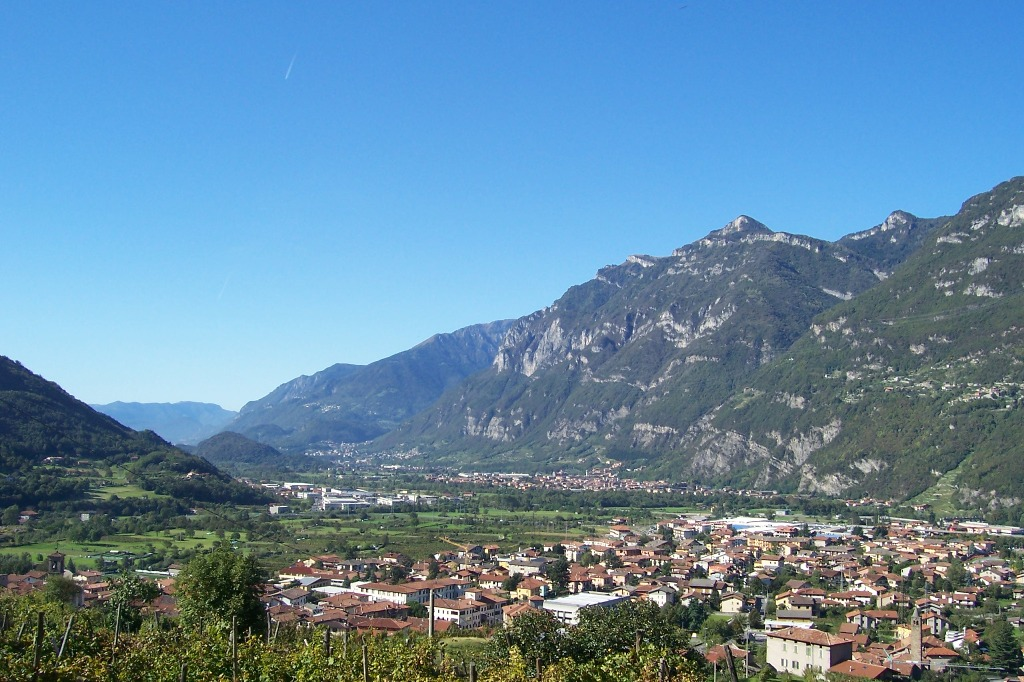
- Piancogno

- Location within Italy Location within Lombardy
- Coordinates: 45°55′14″N 10°13′34″E
- Country: Italy
- Region: Lombardy
- Province: Province of Brescia (BS)
- Frazioni: Piamborno, Cogno, Annunciata

Area
  - Total: 13 km^{2} (5.0 sq mi)

Population (2011)
  - Total: 4,708
  - Density: 360/km^{2} (940/sq mi)
- Demonym: Piancognesi
- Time zone: UTC+1 (CET)
  - Summer (DST): UTC+2 (CEST)
- Postal code: 25052
- Dialing code: 0364
- Website: Official website

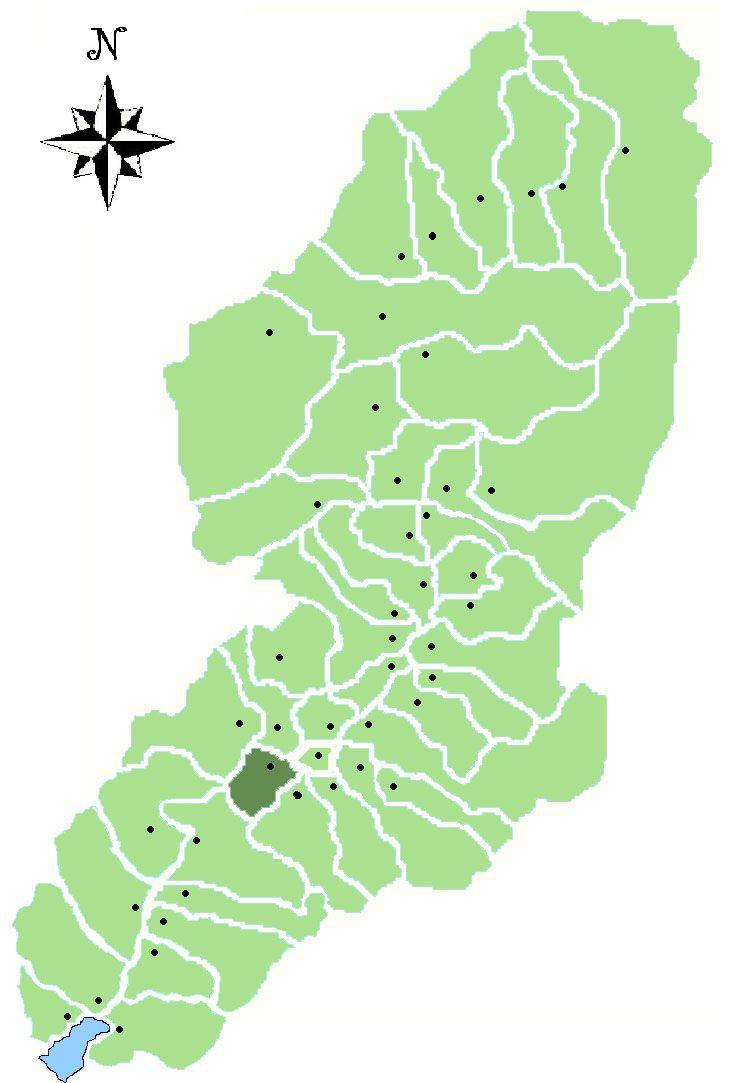
Location of Piancogno in Val Camonica

Piancogno (Camunian: Piàcógn) is a commune in the Italian province of Brescia, in Lombardy.

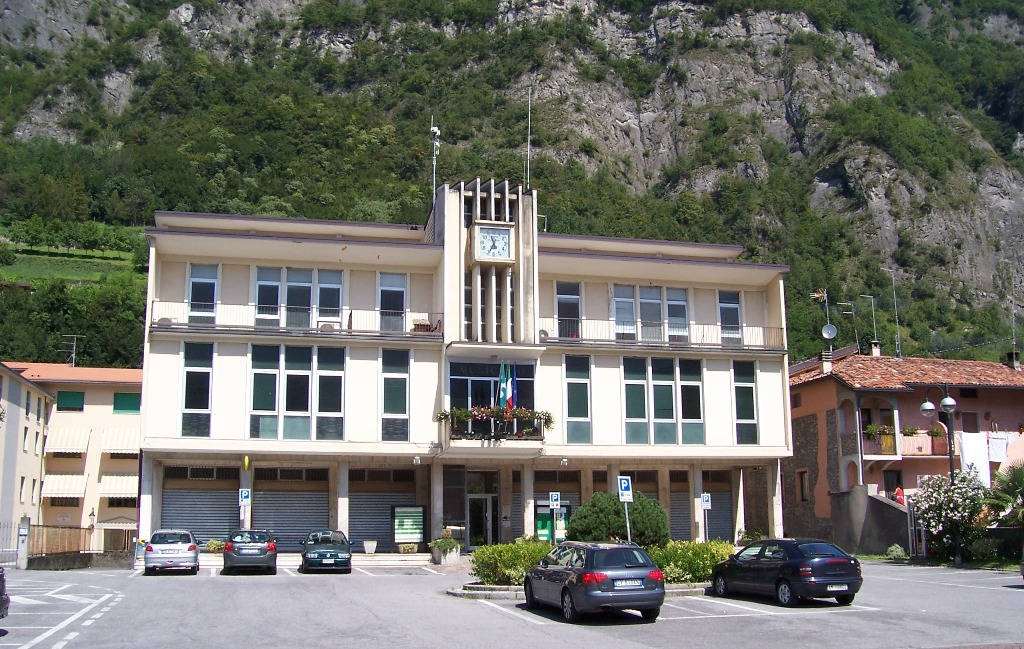
the Town Hall
