= Malegno =

Malegno Malégn
- Comune
- Comune di Malegno
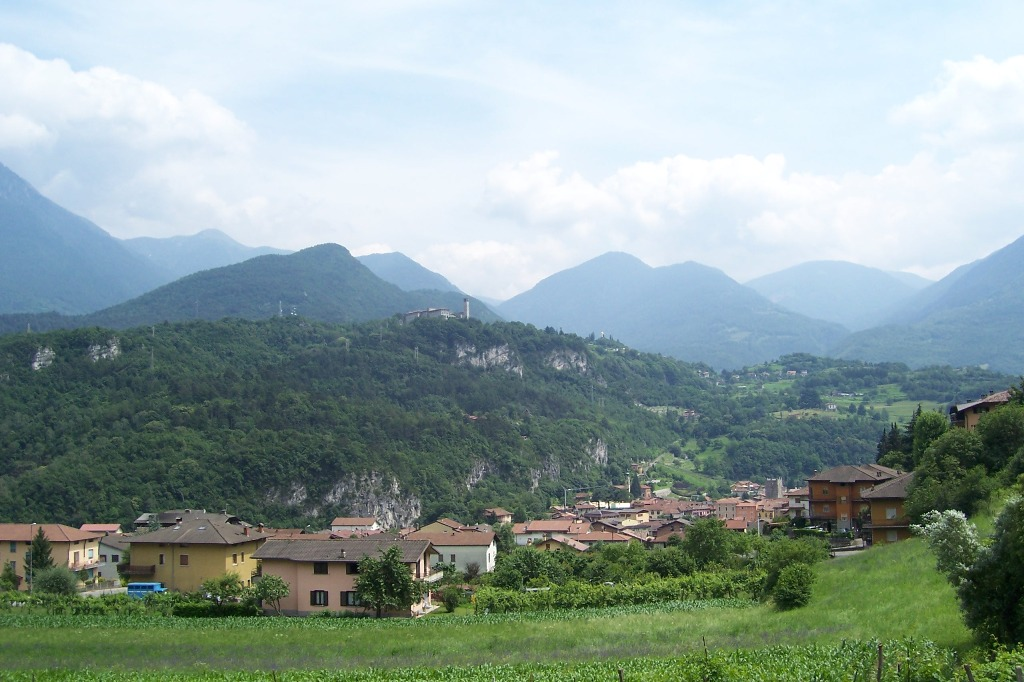

- Coat of arms

- Location within Italy Location within Lombardy
- Coordinates: 45°57′6″N 10°16′30″E
- Country: Italy
- Region: Lombardy
- Province: Brescia (BS)

Government
  - Mayor: Paolo Erba

Area
  - Total: 6.89 km^{2} (2.66 sq mi)
- Elevation: 364 m (1,194 ft)

Population (30 November 2016)
  - Total: 2,017
  - Density: 293/km^{2} (758/sq mi)
- Demonym: Malegnesi
- Time zone: UTC+1 (CET)
  - Summer (DST): UTC+2 (CEST)
- Postal code: 25053
- Dialing code: 0364
- Website: Official website

Malegno (Camunian: Malégn) is a comune in Val Camonica, province of Brescia, Lombardy, northern Italy. Malegno lies on the right bank of the river Oglio, and is crossed by the river Lanico.

== History ==
Traces of ancient human activities are represented by two statues-stele, founded in the "Bagnolo" area, west of Malegno.

In 1758 the waters of Lanico flooded the area.

By decree of 1928 the town of Malegno was united with that of Cividate Camuno, forming a single commune until 1947.

== Main sights ==
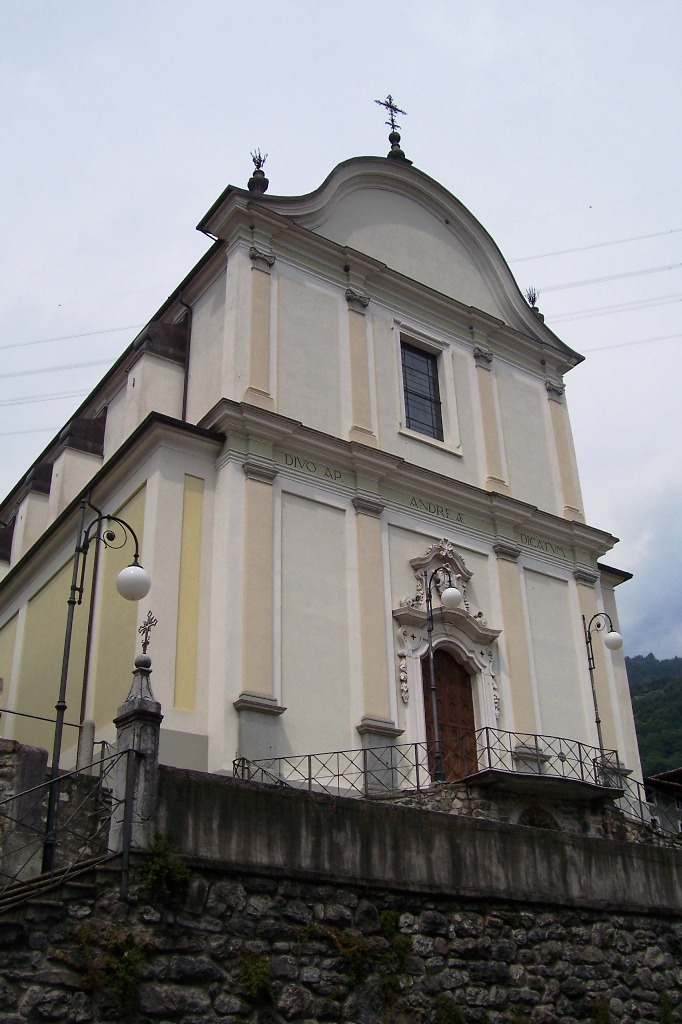
Parish Church of St. Andrew (new church).

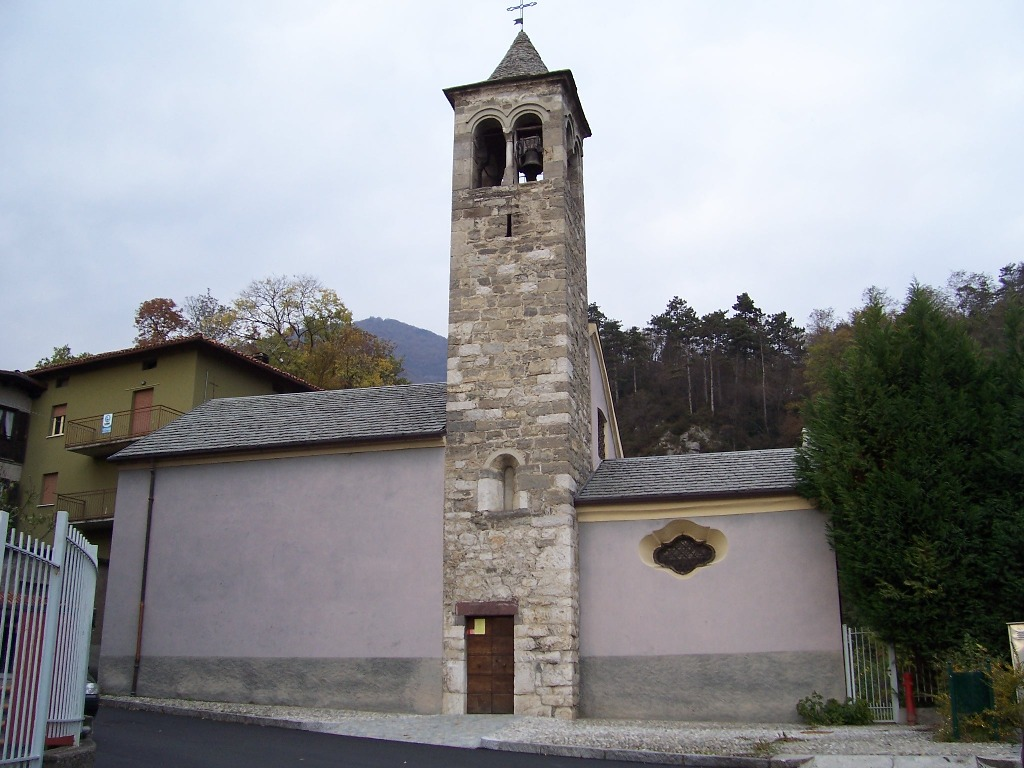
Church of Santa Maria al Ponte

- Parish Church of St. Andrew, built between 1706 and 1709.
- former parish of St. Andrew, modified in the 15th, 16th, and 17th century.
- Church of Santa Maria at the Bridge, near the Hospital Vallecamonica. It dates from the 14th century.

== Culture ==
The scütüm are, in Camunian dialect, nicknames, sometimes personal, elsewhere showing the characteristic features of a community. The one which characterize the people of Malegno is Crape de Legn, Malignù, Getù.
