= Losine =

Losine Lúden
- Comune
- Comune di Losine
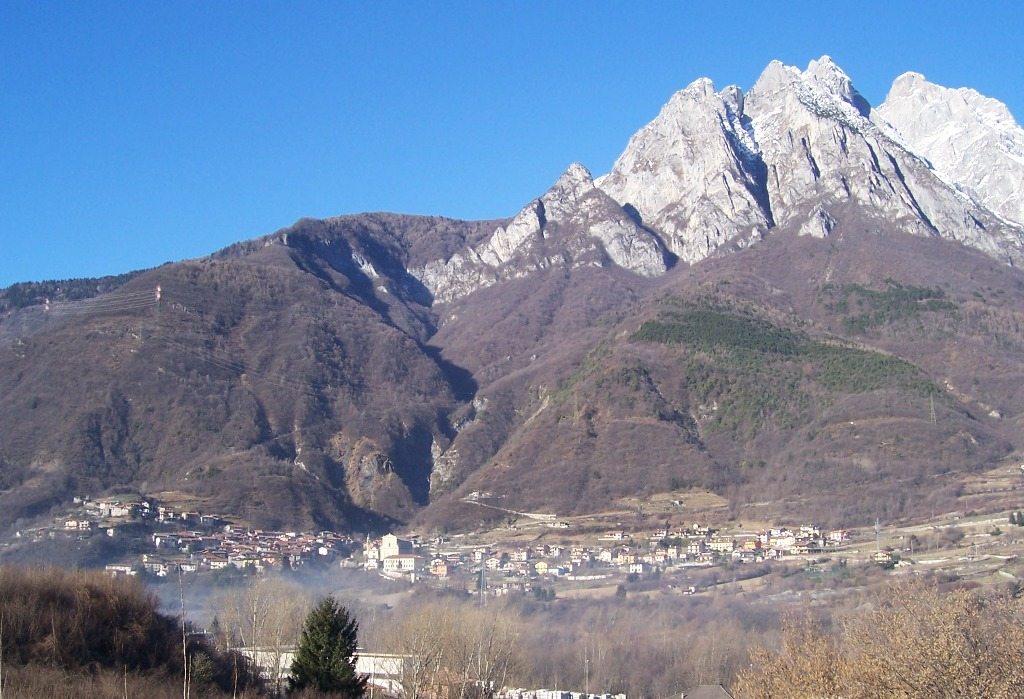
- Losine's panorama

- Location within Italy Location within Lombardy
- Coordinates: 45°59′3″N 10°19′1″E
- Country: Italy
- Region: Lombardy
- Province: Brescia (BS)

Area
  - Total: 6 km^{2} (2.3 sq mi)
- Elevation: 368 m (1,207 ft)

Population (2011)
  - Total: 598
  - Density: 100/km^{2} (260/sq mi)
- Time zone: UTC+1 (CET)
  - Summer (DST): UTC+2 (CEST)
- Postal code: 25040
- Dialing code: 0364
- Patron saint: San Maurizio martire
- Saint day: 22 settembre
- Website: Official website

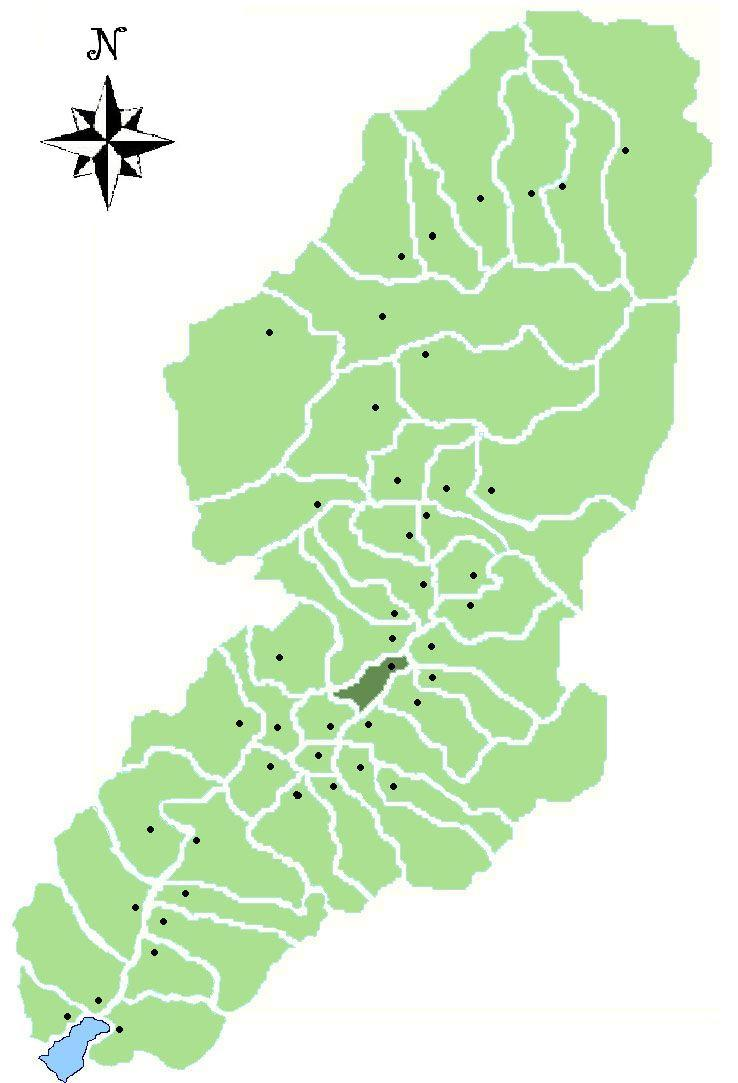
Location of Losine in Val Camonica

Losine (Camunian: Lúden) is a village and comune in the province of Brescia, in Lombardy. Neighbouring communes are Braone, Breno, Cerveno, Malegno and Niardo.

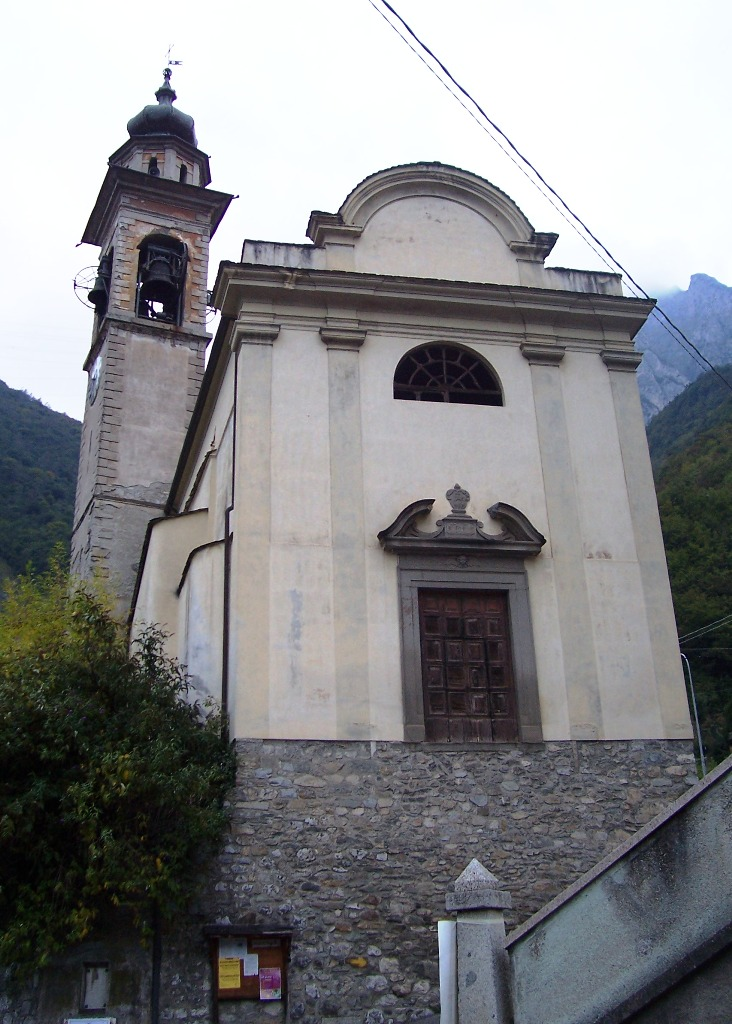
Parish church
