= Sonico, Lombardy =

Sonico Sónec (Lombard)
- Comune
- Comune di Sonico
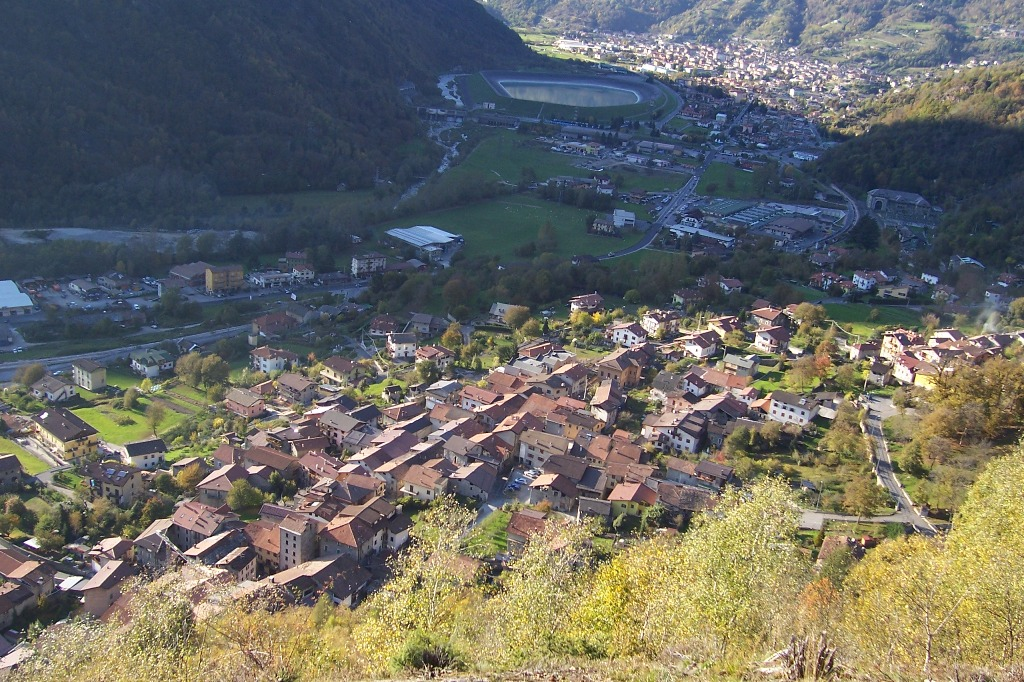
- Sonico

- Location within Italy Location within Lombardy
- Coordinates: 46°9′59″N 10°21′14″E
- Country: Italy
- Region: Lombardy
- Province: Brescia (BS)
- Frazioni: Garda, Rino

Area
  - Total: 60 km^{2} (23 sq mi)
- Elevation: 650 m (2,130 ft)

Population (2011)
  - Total: 1,287
  - Density: 21/km^{2} (56/sq mi)
- Time zone: UTC+1 (CET)
  - Summer (DST): UTC+2 (CEST)
- Postal code: 25050
- Dialing code: 0364
- Patron saint: San Lorenzo
- Saint day: 10 August
- Website: Official website

Sonico (Camunian: Sónec) is a comune in the province of Brescia, in Lombardy. It is situated on the left bank of the river Oglio, in Val Camonica. It is bounded by the communes of Berzo Demo, Cevo, Edolo, Malonno and Saviore dell'Adamello.

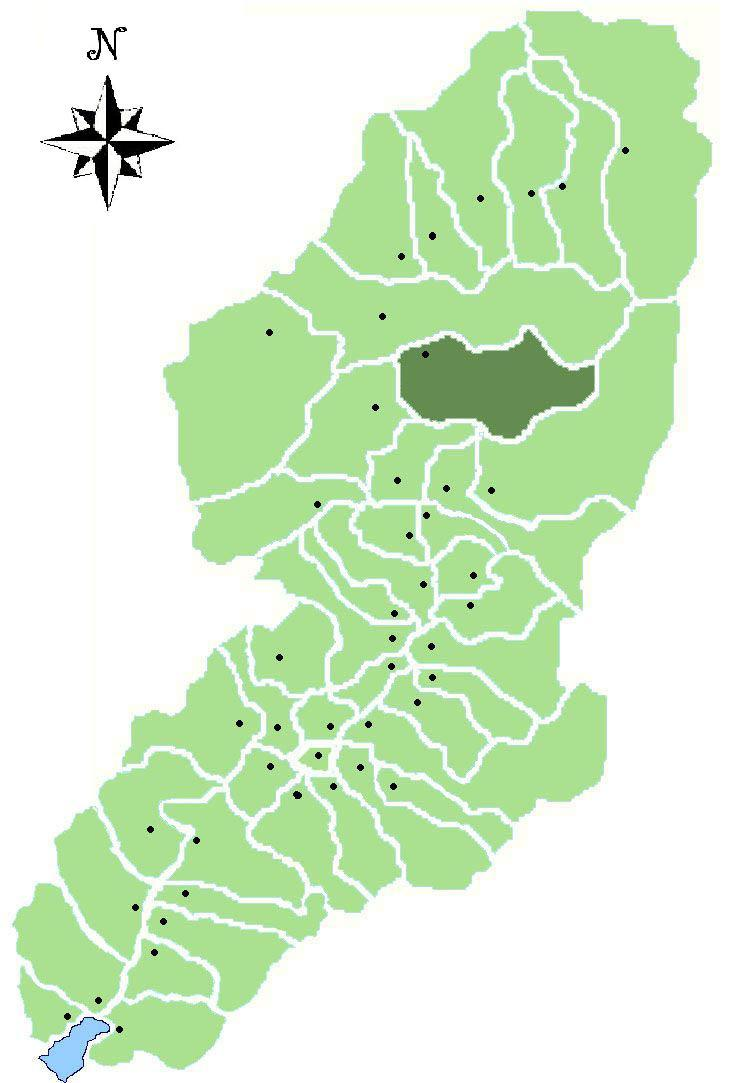
Location of Sonico in Val Camonica

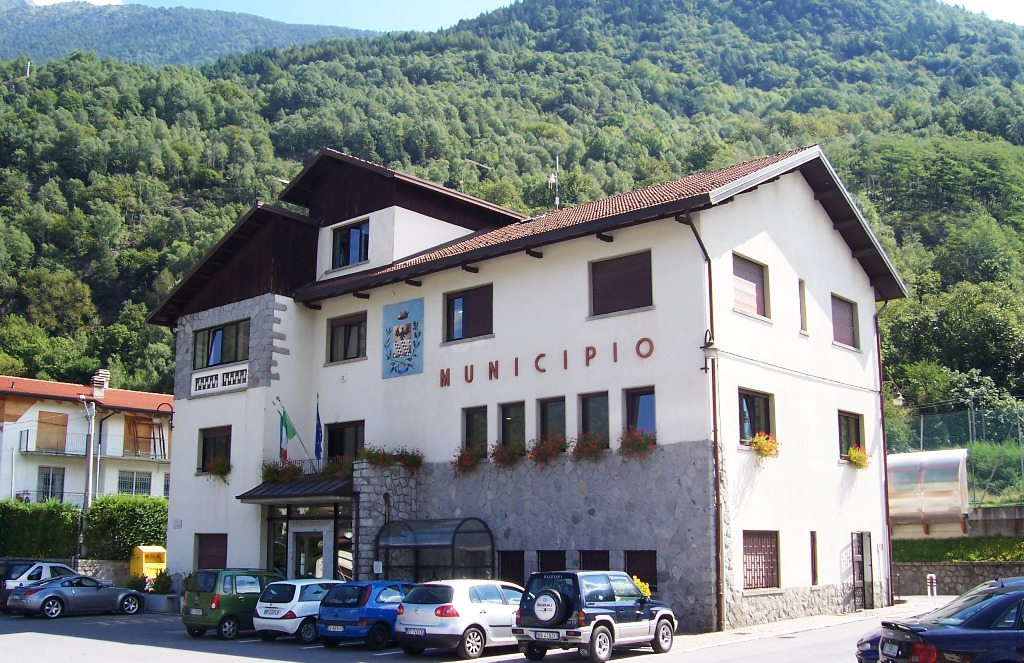
the Town Hall
