= Cedegolo =

Cedegolo Sedégol
- Comune
- Comune di Cedegolo
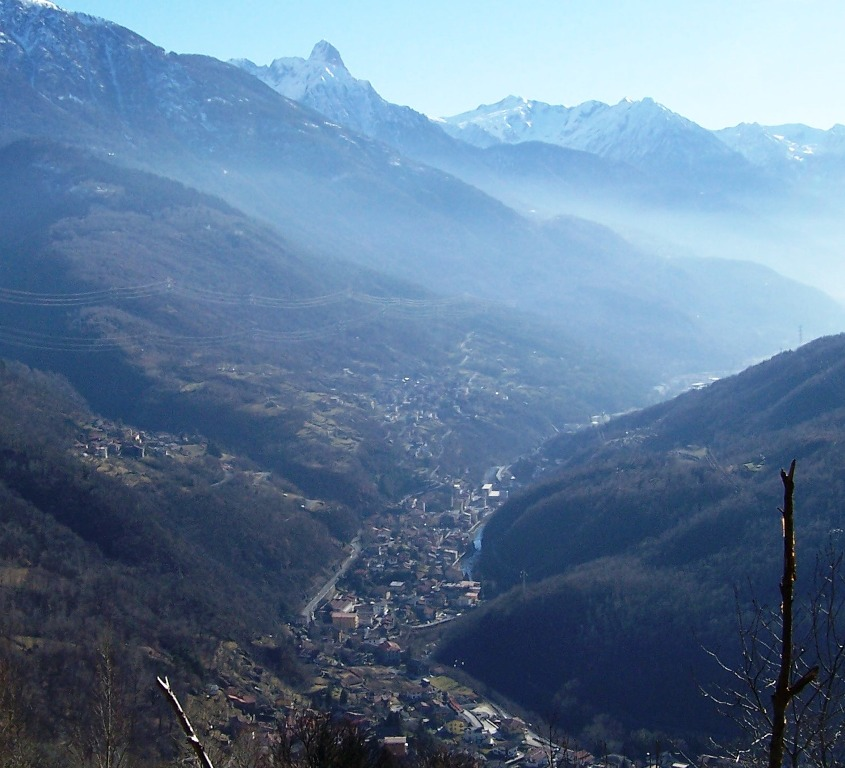

- Coat of arms

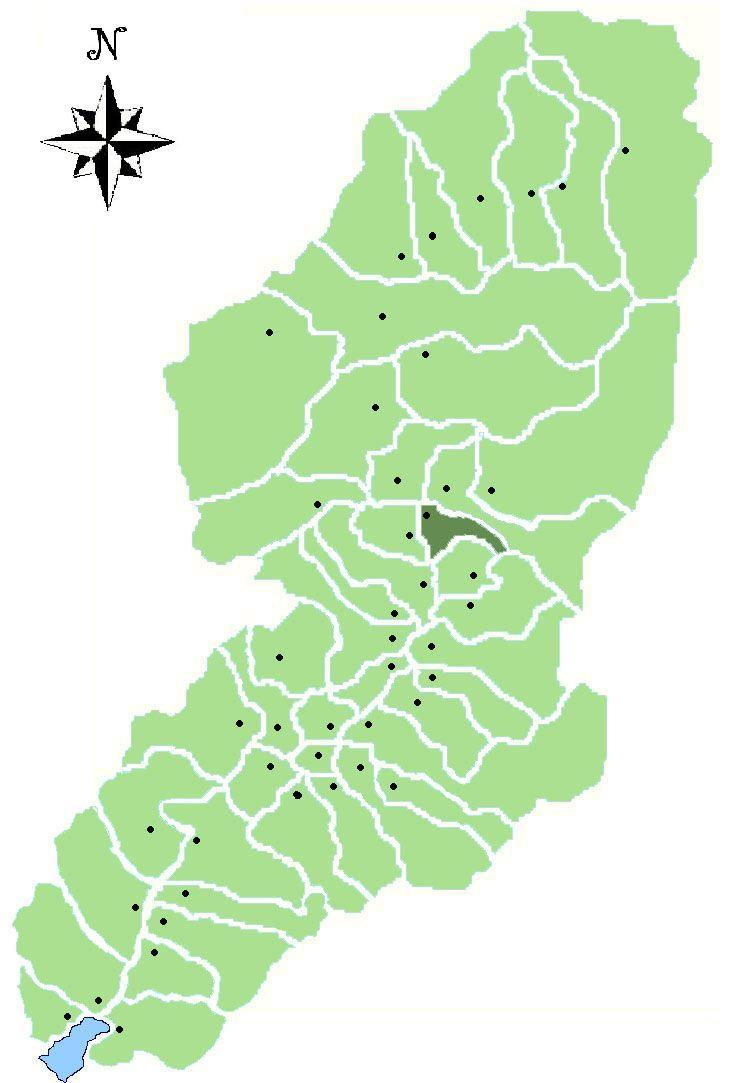

- Location within Italy Location within Lombardy
- Coordinates: 46°04′39″N 10°21′2″E
- Country: Italy
- Region: Lombardy
- Province: Brescia (BS)
- Frazioni: Grevo

Government
  - Mayor: Aurelia Milesi

Area
  - Total: 11.08 km^{2} (4.28 sq mi)

Population (30 June 2017)
  - Total: 1,196
  - Density: 107.9/km^{2} (279.6/sq mi)
- Demonym: Cedegolesi
- Time zone: UTC+1 (CET)
  - Summer (DST): UTC+2 (CEST)
- Postal code: 25051
- Dialing code: 0364
- Patron saint: St. Jerome
- Saint day: September 30
- Website: Official website

Cedegolo (Camunian: Sedégol) is an Italian comune of 1,258 inhabitants in Val Camonica, province of Brescia, in Lombardy, northern Italy.

== Geography ==
The village of Cedegolo is located in a narrow gorge formed by Oglio river, on its eastern side. It is crossed by two streams: the Val Gravagna, further north, and the Poia, to the south.

== History ==
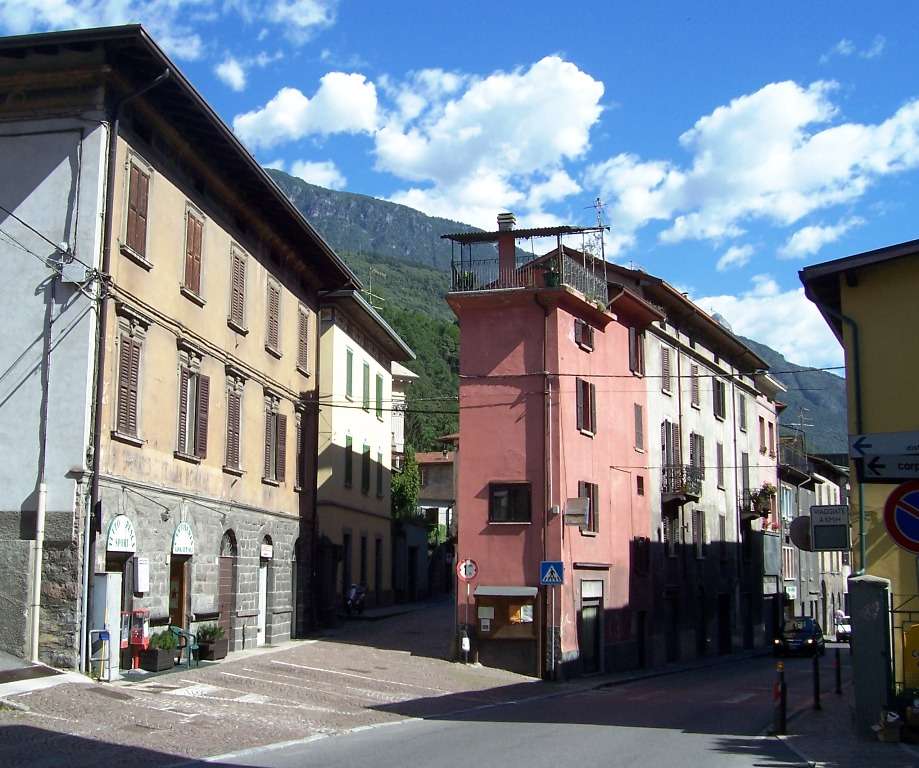
Center town of Cedegolo

The comune of Cedegolo was created in 1797, at the fall of the Republic of Venice, but became a hamlet of Grevo in 1798. The bridge over the river Poglia (Pôya in eastern Lombard), in the center of the village, was completed in 1592.

From Cedegolo in July 1866 the fourth regiment of volunteers in Italy and the Second Battalion of bersaglieri moved to enter Austrian Trentino, through the Lake Arno.

== Main sights ==
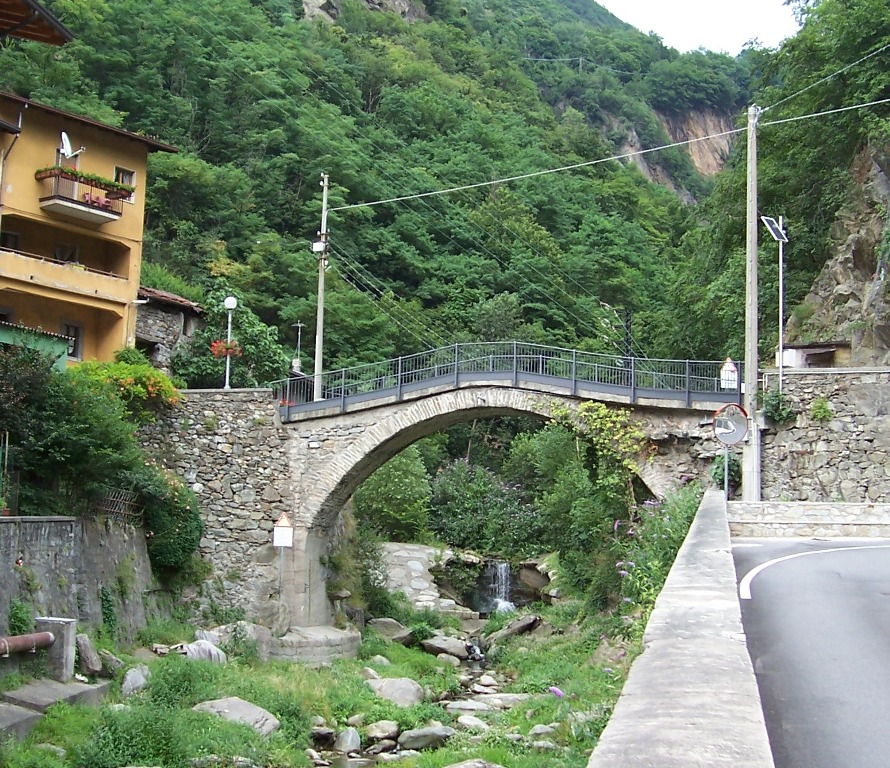
Bridge on stream Poia

- Parish of Saint Jerome, from the early 17th century. The altar is by Pietro Ramus.

== Culture ==
The skötöm are in camunian dialect nicknames, sometimes personal, elsewhere showing the characteristic features of a community. The one which characterize the people of Cedegolo is Lìca-tóncc.

Cedegolo is one of the few toponyms which in Eastern Lombard requires the determinative article: el Sedegòl.

At least until the second half of the twentieth century the young men of Cedegolo followed the tradition of "tunà" (literally: to shoot) or "fa saltà le tòle" ("to make boxes jump") on the St. Jerome calendar day. It was a pretty dangerous activity involving controlled explosions of acetylene gas, prepared by mixing water with calcium carbide in a hole in the ground covered by a suitable container.
