= Braone =

Braone Braù
- Comune
- Comune di Braone
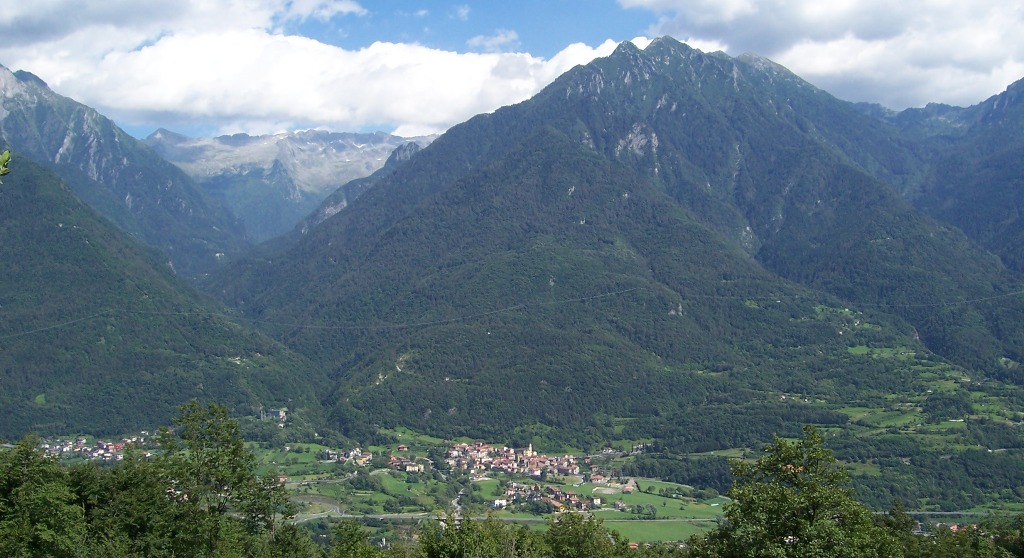
- View of Braone

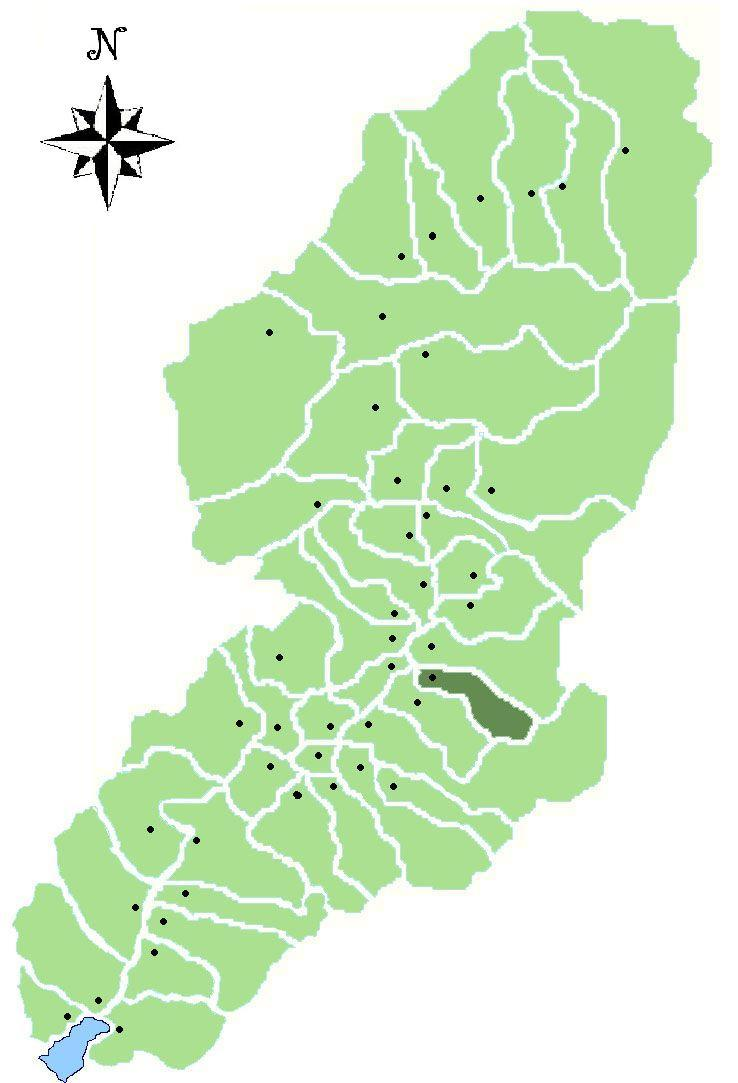

- Location within Italy Location within Lombardy
- Coordinates: 45°59′30″N 10°20′36″E
- Country: Italy
- Region: Lombardy
- Province: Brescia (BS)

Government
  - Mayor: Gabriele Prandini

Area
  - Total: 13.36 km^{2} (5.16 sq mi)
- Elevation: 394 m (1,293 ft)

Population (30 April 2017)
  - Total: 689
  - Density: 51.6/km^{2} (134/sq mi)
- Demonym: Braonesi
- Time zone: UTC+1 (CET)
  - Summer (DST): UTC+2 (CEST)
- Postal code: 25040
- Dialing code: 0364
- Patron saint: Purification of the Blessed Virgin Mary (Candlemas)
- Saint day: 2 February
- Website: Official website

Braone (Camunian: Bragù or Braù) is an Italian comune of 672 inhabitants in Val Camonica, province of Brescia, in Lombardy.

It is bounded by other communes of Breno, Cerveno, Ceto, Losine, Niardo.

== History ==
In 1956 coins were discovered in Braone, the latest of which date back to Anastasius I (circa 518 CE).

== Main sights ==
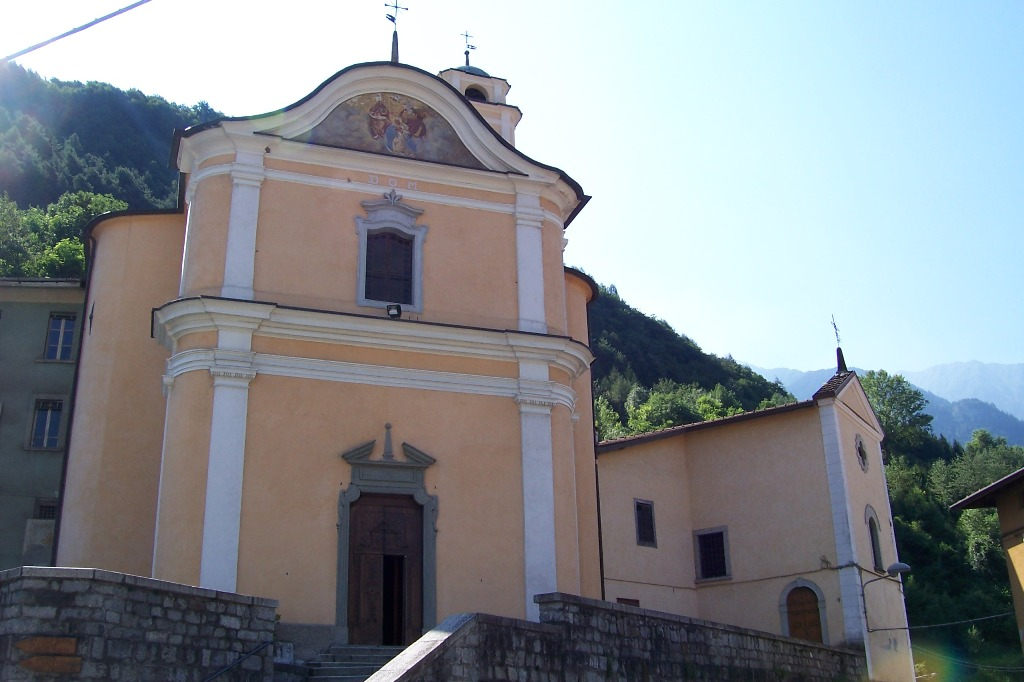
Parish church

- Parish Church of the Purification of the Virgin Mary, reported already in 1439, has a stone portal Sarnico of the eighteenth century. The altarpiece is by Fiammenghino.
