= Italian front (World War I) =

Italian theatre of World War I

- Part of the European theatre of World War I
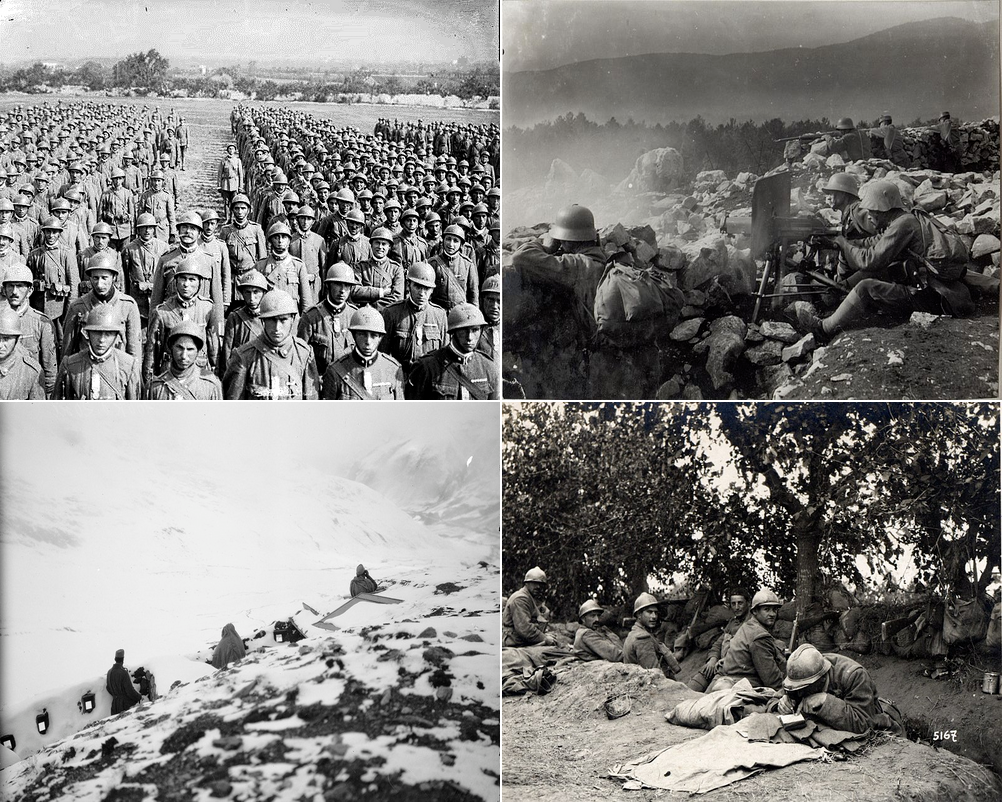
- Clockwise from top left: Italian soldiers listening to their general's speech; Austro-Hungarian trench on the Isonzo; Italian trench on the Piave; Austro-Hungarian trench in the Alps
Date	24 May 1915 – 4 November 1918 (3 years, 5 months and 2 weeks)
Location	Eastern Alps and Venetian Plain
Result	Allied victory; Armistice of Villa Giusti; Dissolution of Austria-Hungary; Treaty of Saint-Germain-en-Laye; Treaty of Trianon
Territorial changes	Italy annexes Trento, Trieste, South Tyrol and Istria

Belligerents
Allied Powers: (Kingdom of Italy) Italy; United Kingdom; France; United States	Central Powers: Austria-Hungary; Germany

Commanders and leaders
(Kingdom of Italy) Luigi Cadorna; (Kingdom of Italy) Armando Diaz; (United Kingdom of Great Britain and Ireland) Rudolph Lambart; (French Third Republic) Jean César Graziani	(Austria-Hungary) Svetozar Boroevic; (Austria-Hungary) Conrad von Hötzendorf; (Austria-Hungary) Arz von Straußenburg; (Austria-Hungary) Aloysius Stepinac; (German Empire) Otto von Below

Strength
Italy; 1915: up to 58 divisions; Total mobilized: 5,615,000; United Kingdom; 1917: 3 divisions; France; 1918: 2 divisions; Czechoslovak Legion; 1918: 5 regiments; Romanian Legion; 1918: 3 regiments; United States; 1918: 1,200 in one regiment	Austria-Hungary; 1915: up to 61 divisions; German Empire; 1917: 5 divisions

Casualties and losses
(Kingdom of Italy) 1,954,875: 357,595 dead (excluding prisoners and missing); 946,640 wounded; 81,430 missing (Note: Presumed dead by 1921); 569,210 captured (Note: c. 300,000 alone during Caporetto 24 October – 19 November 1917. Note that Italian losses listed are for the entire war, including other fronts and in rear areas. From 90,000 to over 100,000 Italian prisoners of war died in captivity.); (United Kingdom of Great Britain and Ireland) 6,700: 1,057 killed; 4,971 wounded; 670 missing/captured; (French Third Republic) 2,872: 480 killed; (700 died indirectly); 2,302 wounded; Unknown captured	(Austria-Hungary) 1,400,000–2,300,000: (Note: Exact figures missing in von Horstenau's work for the year 1916 are provided for August in Wilfried Thanner, Analyse des Stellungskrieges am Isonzo von 1915–1917, p. 301 link text and for the time period 15 May – 31 July 1916, from k.u.k. official reports, in Gianni Pieropan, 1916. Le montagne scottano, Tamari editori, Bologna, 1968, p. 214.); 155,350–364,000 killed (Note: 150,812 soldiers and 4,538 officers documented killed in action at the front.); 560,863–1,086,000 wounded; 175,041 missing (Note: How many of the 175,041 missing were presumed dead by 1921 is not determined. Overall 341,601 Austro-Hungarian soldiers and officers were missing and presumed dead by 1921, an unknown share of that falls onto the Italian Front. Bodart estimates that, overall, half of Austro-Hungarian missing during the war likely died.); 477,024–653,000 captured (Note: C. 380,000 alone during Vittorio Veneto 24 October – 4 November 1918); (German Empire) Unknown

The Italian front (Italian: Fronte italiano; German: Südwestfront) was one of the main theatres of war of World War I. It involved a series of military engagements along the border between the Kingdom of Italy and Austria-Hungary from 1915 to 1918. The Kingdom of Italy entered the war on the Entente side, although they had previously been allied with Germany and Austria-Hungary in the Triple Alliance. They claimed that this alliance was void due to the treaty being defensive and the Germans attacking first. When they joined the war, they were aiming to annex the Italian-speaking provinces of Trento and Trieste (the main objectives of Italian irredentism) and also German-speaking South Tyrol and the largely Slavic regions (where Italian minorities lived) of Istria and northern Dalmatia from their previous ally Austria-Hungary. Those territories were secretly promised to the Italians in the 1915 Treaty of London by Britain, France and Russia. The front soon bogged down into trench warfare, similar to that on the Western Front. Fighting also occurred at high altitudes and with extremely cold winters. The war along the front displaced much of the local population, and several thousand civilians died from malnutrition and illness in Italian and Austro-Hungarian refugee camps.

Military operations came to an end in 1918 with Italian victory and the capture of Trento and Trieste by the Royal Italian Army. Austria-Hungary disintegrated due to military defeats and internal turmoil caused by pacifists and separatists. All military operations on the front came to an end with the entry into force of the armistice of Villa Giusti on 4 November 1918. The treaties of 1919 and 1920 allowed Italy to annex Trento, Trieste, South Tyrol and Istria, while northern Dalmatia was assigned to Yugoslavia, with the exception of the province of Zara. The annexation of Trento and Trieste is seen as the culmination of the Italian unification and, for this reason, the Italian intervention in World War I is also considered the Fourth Italian War of Independence, in a historiographical perspective that identifies in the latter the conclusion of the unification of Italy, whose military actions began during the revolutions of 1848 with the First Italian War of Independence.

== History ==
=== Pre-war period ===
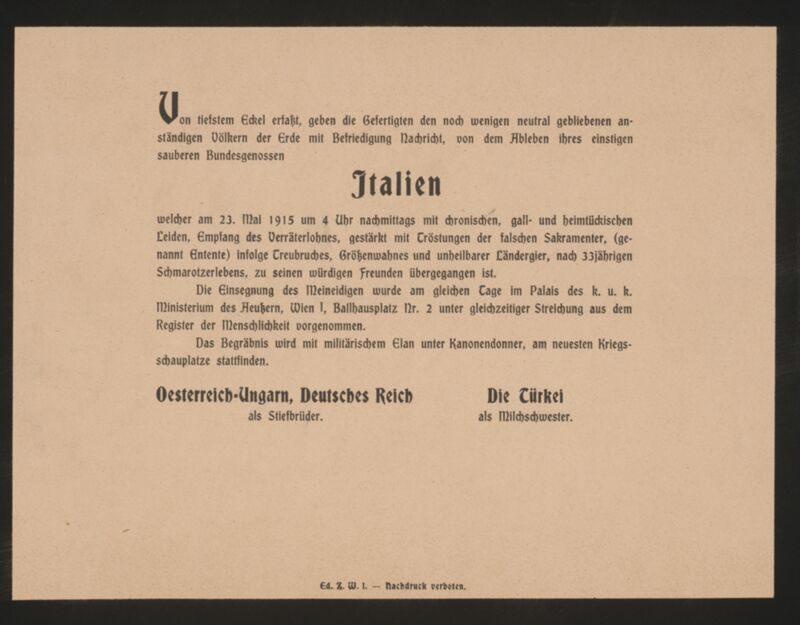
Anti-Italian leaflet distributed by the Austro-Hungarian government, mocking Italy's entry in the war by describing it as the day "Italy died".

- 1908: Bosnian Crisis: Italy expected compensations in the areas of "Italia Irredenta" ruled by Austria-Hungary in exchange for its recognition of the annexation of Bosnia-Herzegovina, as was agreed upon in the Triple Alliance treaties with Austria-Hungary. However, this did not happen and this became one of the reasons for Italy to break its alliance with Austria-Hungary in 1915. The mutual compensation clause was Article 7 of the 1909 and 1912 versions of the same treaty:

However, if, in the course of events, the maintenance of the status quo in the regions of the Balkans or of the Ottoman coasts and islands in the Adriatic and in the Aegean Sea should become impossible, and if, whether in consequence of the action of a third Power or otherwise, Austria-Hungary or Italy should find themselves under the necessity of modifying it by a temporary or permanent occupation on their part, this occupation shall take place only after a previous agreement between the two Powers, based upon the principle of reciprocal compensation for every advantage, territorial or other, which each of them might obtain beyond the present status quo, and giving satisfaction to the interests and well-founded claims of the two Parties.

- 1911: Italo-Turkish War: The war is regarded as a major escalation stage on the way to World War I. The weakening of the Ottoman Empire alienated Italy from its previous partners in the Triple Alliance. Germany viewed the Ottomans as an ally and Austria-Hungary's position was further complicated by the subsequent Balkan Wars, which Bulgaria, Greece, Serbia and Montenegro ignited by the prospect of an Italian victory.
- 1914: 28 June, the Assassination of Archduke Franz Ferdinand in Sarajevo by the Serbian nationalist Gavrilo Princip. The Archduke was heir to the throne and the main proponent of Trialism. Such reforms would have transformed the dual monarchy Austria-Hungary into a tripartite state Austria-Hungary-Croatia, which competed with Serbia's interest in founding a South Slavic kingdom under Serbian leadership.
- 1914: 1 July, Alberto Pollio, the Chief of Staff of the Royal Italian Army since 1908, dies unexpectedly and is replaced by Luigi Cadorna. According to Alfred von Kleist, German military attaché in Rome, in a dispatch from April 1914, Pollio was considered utmost stable, loyal and fully committed to the Triple Alliance and its military prospects.
- 1914: July Crisis: The Austro-Hungarian foreign minister, Berchtold, deliberately fails to inform the (official) allies, Italy and Romania, of the intended action against Serbia, breaching Article 7 of the Triple Alliance, since he foresaw that consent would only be given in exchange for compensation.
- 1914: 2 August, Antonio Salandra declares Italy's neutrality, in conjunction with Article 3 of the Triple Alliance.
- 1914: 5 November, Sidney Sonnino is appointed Minister of Foreign Affairs and makes it a priority to pressure Austria-Hungary on Article 7 of the Triple Alliance in terms of compensation.
- 1915: 9 January, Urged by the German and Austro-Hungarian ambassadors in Rome, Bernhard von Bülow and Karl von Macchio, Berchtold proposes to the Emperor Franz Joseph I to cede the Trentino to Italy as compensation. However, the Emperor and the Hungarian Prime Minister István Tisza reject the proposal and at the instigation of Tisza, Berchtold is removed as Foreign Minister and replaced by the Hungarian Stephan Burián several days later. A German proposal of giving Sosnowiec and its coalfields to Austria-Hungary in turn of compensation for the Trentino was likewise rejected in February 1915.
- 1915: 3 March, Salandra and Sonnino, with the backing of king Victor Emmanuel III, submit an offer to the Triple Entente for intervention in the war. The Siege of Przemyśl on March 22 marks a major setback for Austria-Hungary on the Eastern Front.
- 1915: 26 April, The Treaty of London is signed by the United Kingdom, France, and Russia on the one part, and Italy on the other, in order to entice the latter to enter World War I on the side of the Triple Entente within a month. The Entente also hoped that Romania and Bulgaria would be encouraged to join them after Italy did the same. The Treaty was agreed to be kept a secret according to Article 16, and remained so until December 1917 when Bolshevik leader Vladimir Lenin exposed to the public all treaties of Tsar Nicholas II and the Entente, including the secret treaty of London.
- 1915 - 4 May, In the midst of the Gorlice breakthrough, Salandra officially renounces the Triple Alliance in a note to Germany and Austria-Hungary. But on May 13, threatened without a majority in Parliament, Salandra resigns from office and orders Cadorna to stop mobilization.
- 1915: 16 May, Salandra is reinstated as Giovanni Giolitti failed to form a new government amid rising tensions in the public and threats from the king. When Parliament resumed on May 20 Salandra secured overwhelming majorities (367 to 54 and 407 to 74) on a Bill conferring extraordinary powers upon the Government in the event of war. General mobilization was ordered on May 22.
- 1915: 23 May, Italy declares war on Austria-Hungary.

=== The front ===
==== Topography ====
The Italian Front stretched from the Stelvio Pass (at the border triangle between Italy, Austria-Hungary and Switzerland) along the Tyrolean, Carinthian, and Littoral borders to the Isonzo. Its total length was around 600 kilometers, of which 450 kilometers ran in high alpine terrain. This information relates to measurements as the crow flies. Taking into account the natural terrain, the many saddles, peaks and ridges with the resulting differences in height, the effective length was several thousand kilometers.

The front touched very different geographical areas: in the first three sections - from the Stelvio Pass to the Julian Alps in the area of Tarvisio, it ran through mountainous territory, where the average ridge heights reached 2,700 to 3,200 meters. The higher mountainous regions have a highly rugged relief with little vegetation; elevations over 2,500 meters are also covered by glaciers. The barren landscape and lack of sufficient arable land led to little development of these high elevations; settlement was largely limited to the lower-lying zones. From the Julian Alps to the Adriatic Sea, the mountains are gradually decreasing in height and only rarely reach 1,000 meters as in the area around Gorizia. This area is also sparsely populated and characterized by a harsh climate with cold winters and very hot and dry summers. A craggy karst landscape spreads out around the Isonzo valley, which adjoins the Italian foothills of the Alps in the southwest.

The topographical characteristics of the front area had a concrete impact on the conduct of the war. The rocky ground, for example, made it difficult to dig trenches and in addition, the karst rock in the Isonzo Valley turned out to be an additional danger for the soldiers. If grenades exploded on the porous surface, fragments of the exploding rock acted as additional shrapnel.

==== Mobilization ====
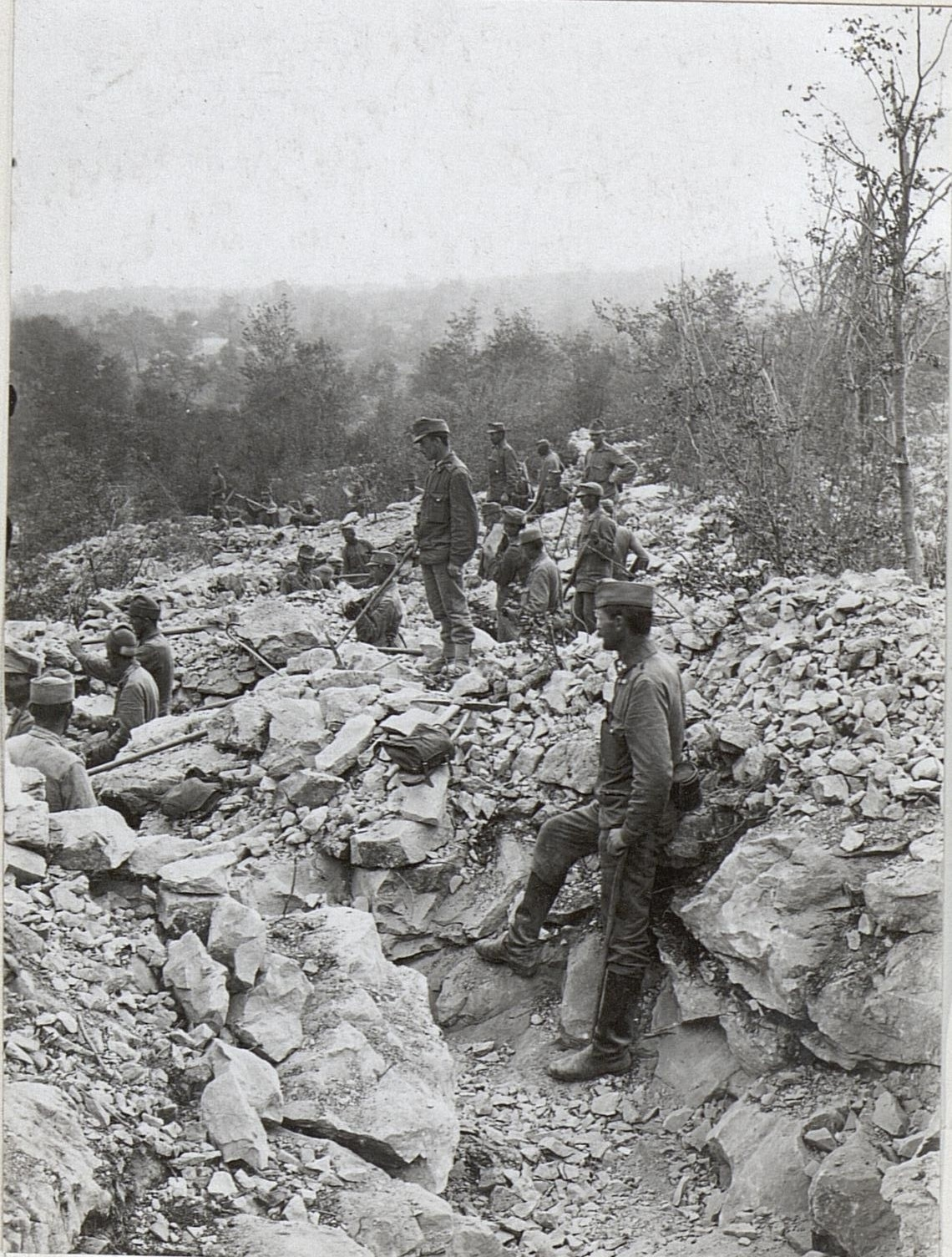
The digging of trenches on the Isonzo front by Austro-Hungarian soldiers

Archduke Eugen, who was already in command of the Balkan forces, was promoted to Generaloberst on May 22, 1915 and was given supreme command of the new southwest front. Together with his chief of staff Alfred Krauß the 5th Army was reorganized and placed under the command of General d. Inf. Svetozar Boroević who on May 27 had arrived from the Eastern Front. The K. u. k. Landesverteidigungskommando in Tyrol (LVK) was handed to GdK Viktor Dankl to protect the Tyrolean borders. It included the German Alpenkorps which was suitable for operations in the high mountains, the first divisions arrived on May 26; a short time later, the Alpenkorps was already taking part in combat operations against Italian units, although the German Empire was not officially at war with Italy until August 28, 1916. The "Armeegruppe Rohr" stood under the command of Franz Rohr von Denta and was to secure the Carinthian front. The transfer of the 5th Army and additional troops from the east went smoothly; within a few weeks, Archduke Eugen had around 225,000 soldiers under his command. In June the 48. Division (FML Theodor Gabriel) and finally, in July, the four Kaiserjäger regiments and three k.k. Landesschützen regiments from Galicia were added. A major advantage of the Austro-Hungarian defense was its entrenchment on higher ground.

Italy ordered general mobilization on May 22, 1915 and by the end of June four armies had marched into the north-east border area. In the deployment plan of the Italian general staff (Commando Supremo) under the direction of FM Luigi Cadorna, three main points were set:

- The 1st Army was to encircle the Tyrolean front from the west and south.
- The 4th Army was to set up position in the Cadore and Carnia
- The 2nd and 3rd Armies on the other hand, were opposed to the 5th k.u.k. Army, in the Julian Alps and on the Isonzo.

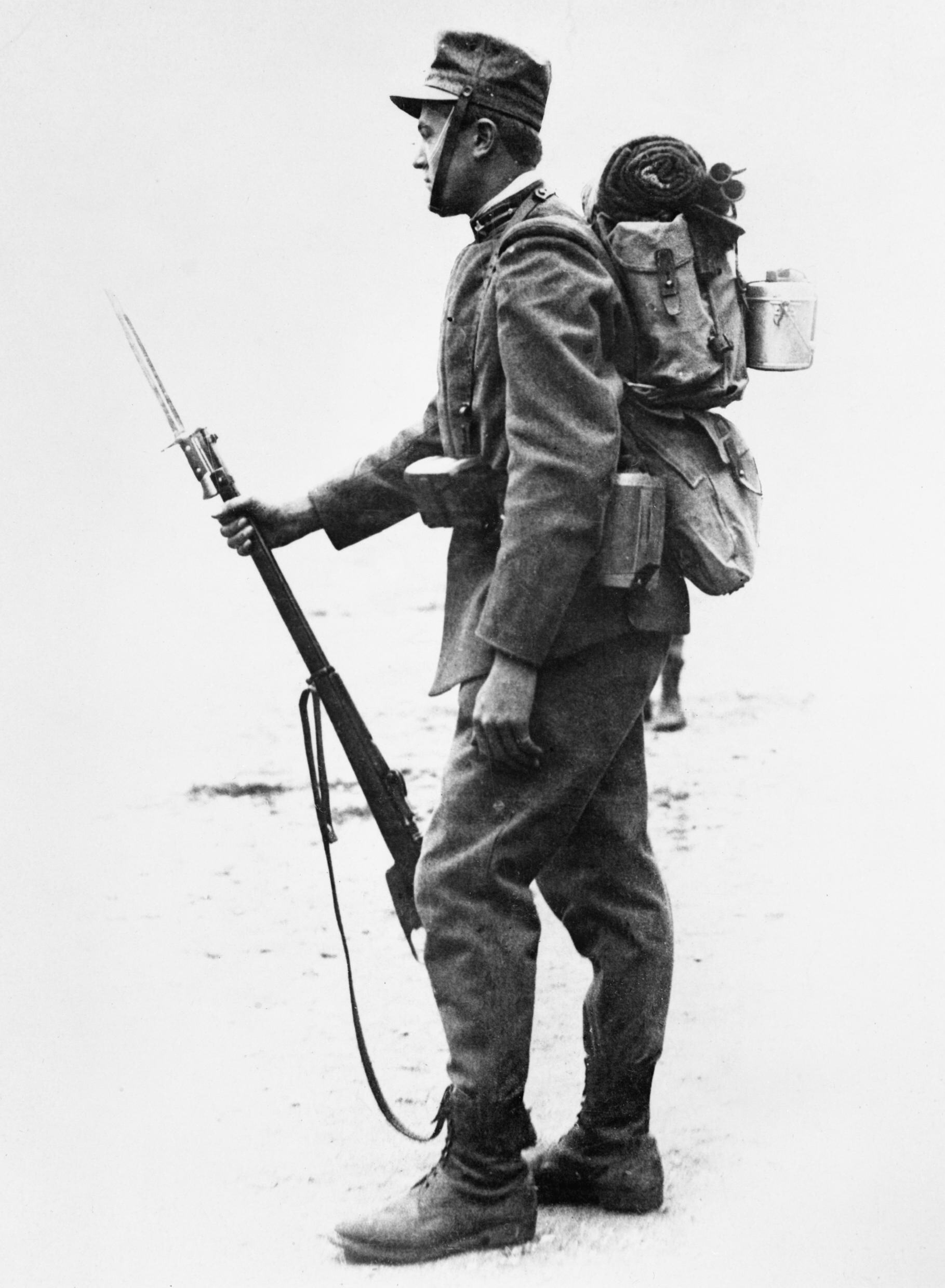
Italian infantry soldier in full marching order; standard Italian Mod. 1909 uniform (used by line Infantery, Bersaglieri, Alpini and Carabinieri), infanterist cap (berretto) and standard Carcano M91 rifle.

Although the Italian armed forces were numerically superior, things initially remained surprisingly quiet on the southwestern front. No attempt was made to break through on the Tyrolean front, and there was no major offensive on the Isonzo either. Due to the hesitant implementation of Cadorna's attack plans, the chance to score the decisive blow right at the beginning was lost. FML Cletus Pichler, the chief of staff of the LVK Tirol, wrote:

A general attack on the most important penetration points, such as the Stilfser Joch, Etschtal, Valsugana, Rollepass [sic], [and] Kreuzbergpass [...] could have led to significant enemy successes in view of the extremely weak defense forces in May.

That the opportunity for a quick breakthrough was not used was partly due to the slow mobilization of the Italian army. Due to the poorly developed transport network, the provision of troops and war material could only be completed in mid-June, i.e. a month later than estimated by the military leadership. The Italian army also suffered from many shortcomings on the structural level. Artillery pieces and munitions were not the only area where shortages were acute. In August 1914 the Italian army had at its disposal only 750,000 rifles of the standard Carcano 1891 model and no hand grenades available at all. This inadequate supply of equipment especially limited the scope and efficiency of training throughout 1914 and 1915. Munitions were also urgently needed: in July 1914 only ca. 700 rounds were available per rifle, despite Cadorna's demand that 2,000 rounds each be found in preparation for war, by May 1915 the army had only succeeded in procuring 900 rounds per rifle. Meanwhile, Emilio De Bono records that "throughout 1915 hand-grenades remained unheard of in the trenches".

Italy's first machine guns were prototypes, as the Perino Model 1908, or Maxim guns acquired in 1913 from the British manufacturer Vickers. In line with the 1911 plan for creating 602 machine gun sections. By August 1914 only 150 of these had been created, meaning there was only one machine gun section per regiment, as opposed to one per battalion, as envisaged in the plans. By May 1915 the Fiat-Revelli Mod. 1914 became the standard machine gun of the Italian army and a total of 309 sections had been created, with 618 guns in total; though this was an improvement it was still only half the planned number, leaving many battalions to do without. In contrast a standard k.u.k regiment had four machine gun sections, MG 07/12 "Schwarzlose", one for each battalion, whilst a standard British regiment had by February 1915 four machine gun sections per battalion.

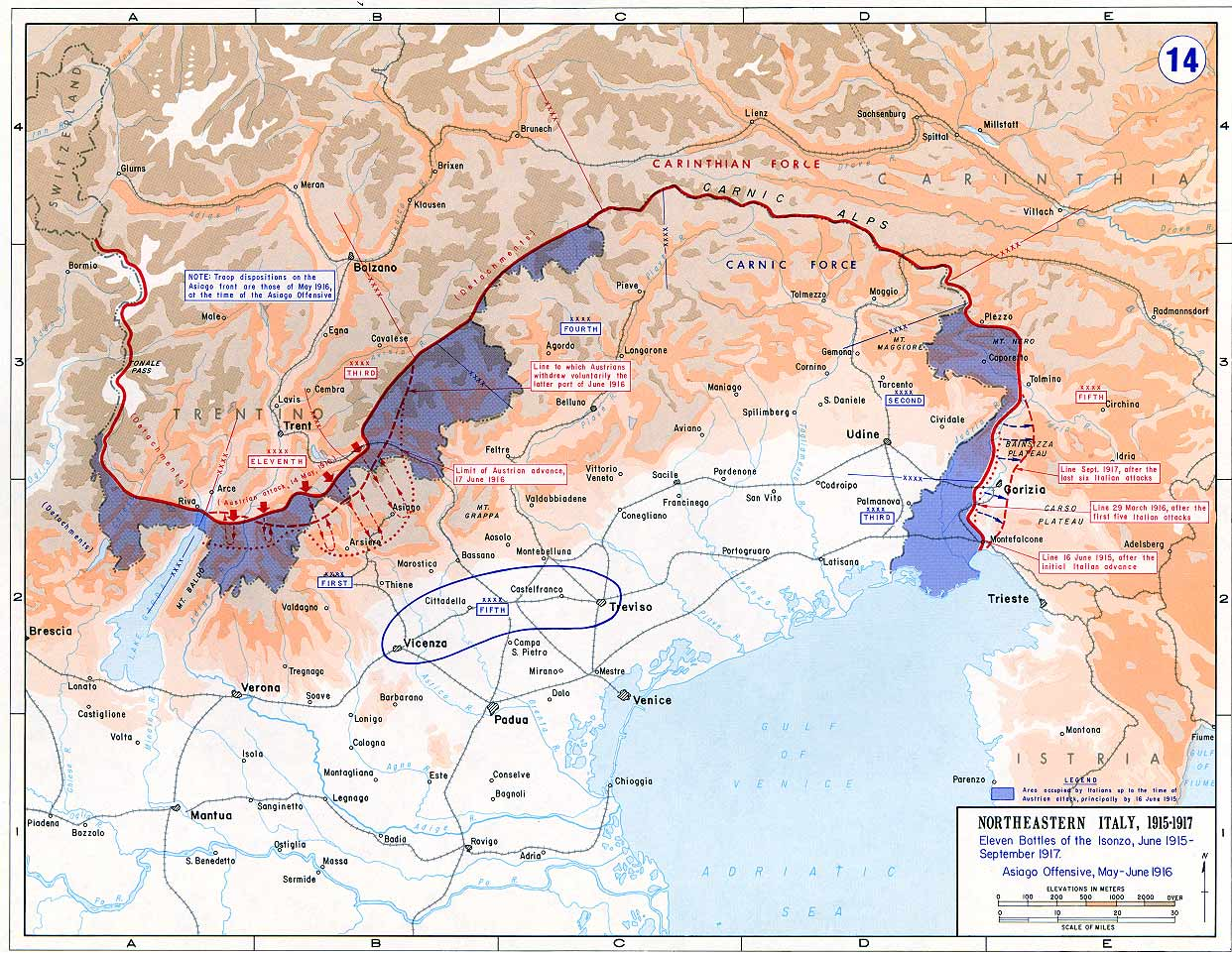
The Italian Front in 1915–1917: eleven Battles of the Isonzo and Asiago offensive. In blue, initial Italian conquests

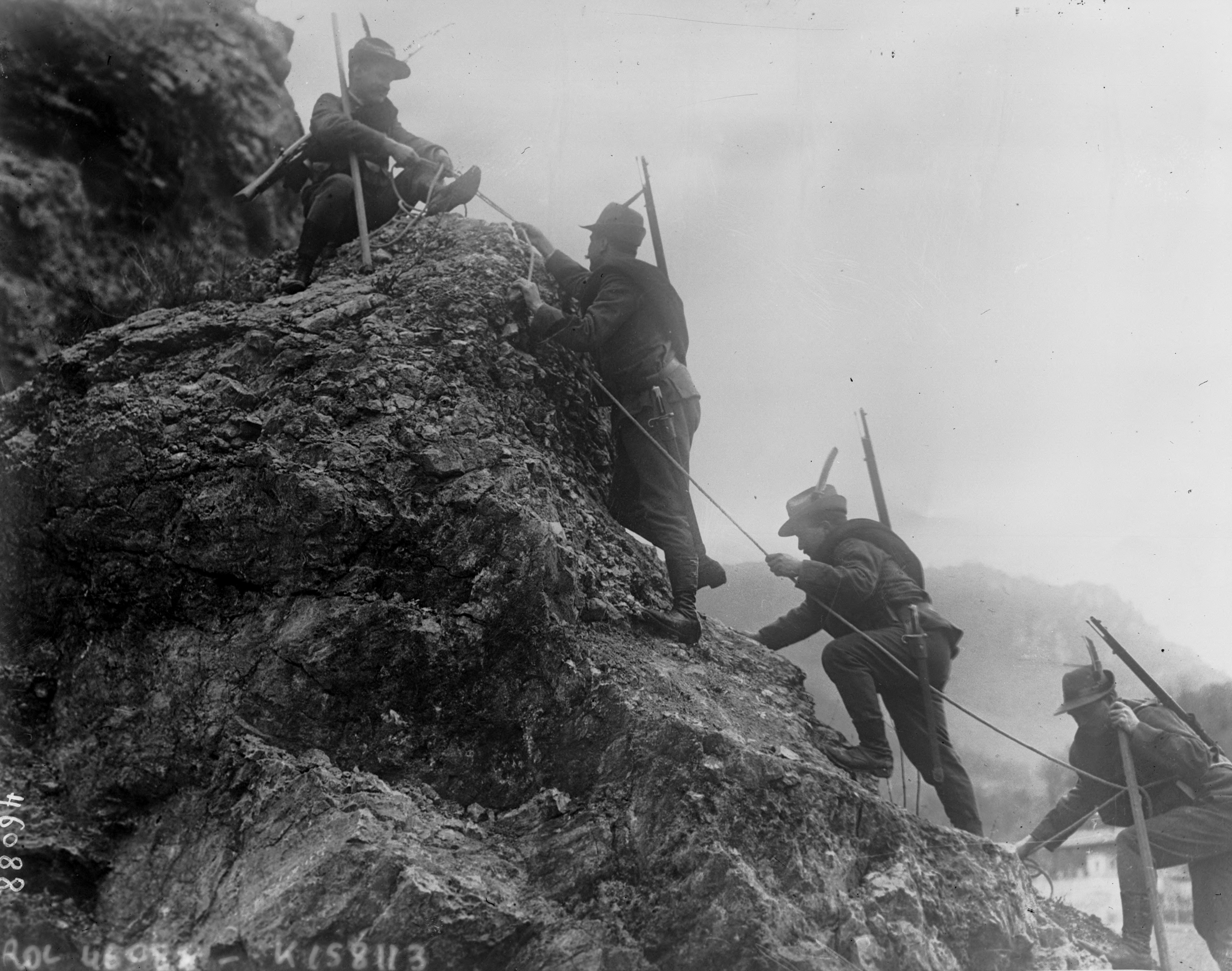
Italian Alpini troops; 1915

During the Italo-Turkish War in Libya (1911–1912), the Italian military suffered equipment and munition shortages not yet repaired before Italian entry into the Great War. At the opening of the campaign, Austro-Hungarian troops occupied and fortified high ground of the Julian Alps and Karst Plateau, but the Italians initially outnumbered their opponents three-to-one.

==== Battles of Isonzo in 1915 ====
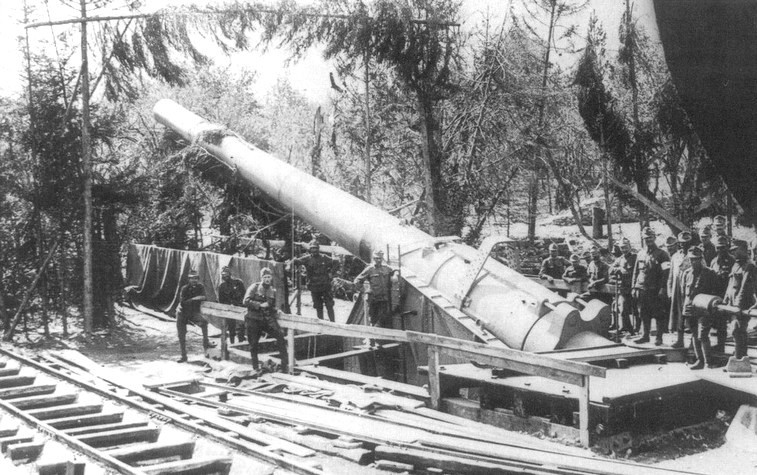
Austro-Hungarian 350 mm (14 in) L/45 M. 16 naval gun

An Italian offensive aimed to cross the Soča (Isonzo) river, take the fortress town of Gorizia, and then enter the Karst Plateau. This offensive opened the first Battles of the Isonzo.

At the beginning of the First Battle of the Isonzo on 23 June 1915, Italian forces outnumbered the Austrians three-to-one but failed to penetrate the strong Austro-Hungarian defensive lines in the highlands of northwestern Gorizia and Gradisca. Because the Austrian forces occupied higher ground, Italians conducted difficult offensives while climbing. The Italian forces therefore failed to drive much beyond the river, and the battle ended on 7 July 1915.

Despite a professional officer corps, severely under-equipped Italian units lacked morale. Also many troops deeply disliked the newly appointed Italian commander, general Luigi Cadorna. Moreover, preexisting equipment and munition shortages slowed progress and frustrated all expectations for a "Napoleonic style" breakout. Like most contemporaneous militaries, the Italian army primarily used horses for transport but struggled and sometimes failed to supply the troops sufficiently in the tough terrain.

Two weeks later on 18 July 1915, the Italians attempted another frontal assault against the Austro-Hungarian trench lines with more artillery in the Second Battle of the Isonzo. In the northern section of the front, the Italians managed to overrun Mount Batognica over Kobarid (Caporetto), which would have an important strategic value in future battles. This bloody offensive concluded in stalemate when both sides ran out of ammunition.

The Italians recuperated, rearmed with 1200 heavy guns, and then on 18 October 1915 launched the Third Battle of the Isonzo, another attack. Forces of Austria-Hungary repulsed this Italian offensive, which concluded on 4 November without resulting gains.

The Italians again launched another offensive on 10 November, the Fourth Battle of the Isonzo. Both sides suffered more casualties, but the Italians conquered important entrenchments, and the battle ended on 2 December for exhaustion of armaments, but occasional skirmishing persisted.

After the winter lull, the Italians launched the Fifth Battle of the Isonzo on 9 March 1916, and captured the strategic Mount Sabatino. But Austria-Hungary repulsed all other attacks, and the battle concluded on 16 March in poor weather for trench warfare.

==== The Asiago offensive ====
Following Italy's stalemate, the Austro-Hungarian forces began planning a counteroffensive (Battle of Asiago) in Trentino and directed over the plateau of Altopiano di Asiago, with the aim to break through to the Po River plain and thus cutting off the 2nd, 3rd, and 4th Italian Armies in the North East of the country. The offensive began on 15 May 1916 with 15 divisions, and resulted in initial gains, but then the Italians counterattacked and pushed the Austro-Hungarians back to the Tyrol.

==== Later battles for the Isonzo ====
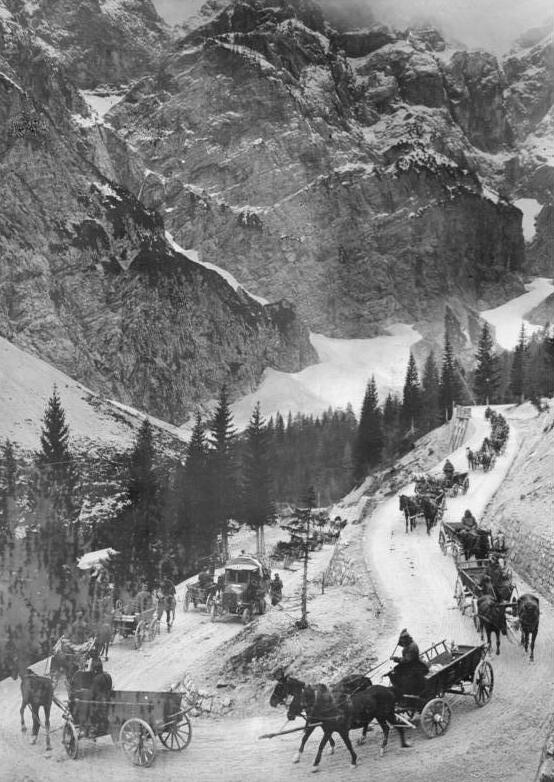
The Austro-Hungarian supply line over the Vršič pass, October 1917

Later in 1916, four more battles along the Isonzo river erupted. The Sixth Battle of the Isonzo, launched by the Italians in August, resulted in a success greater than the previous attacks. The offensive gained nothing of strategic value but did take Gorizia, which boosted Italian spirits. The Seventh, Eighth, and Ninth battles of the Isonzo (14 September – 4 November) managed to accomplish little except to wear down the already exhausted armies of both nations.

The frequency of offensives for which the Italian soldiers partook between May 1915 and August 1917, one every three months, was higher than demanded by the armies on the Western Front. Italian discipline was also harsher, with punishments for infractions of duty of a severity not known in the German, French, and British armies.

Shellfire in the rocky terrain caused 70% more casualties per rounds expended than on the soft ground in Belgium and France. By the autumn of 1917 the Italian army had suffered most of the deaths it was to incur during the war, yet the end of the war seemed to still be an eternity away. This was not the same line of thought for the Austro-Hungarians. On 25 August, the Emperor Charles wrote to the Kaiser the following: "The experience we have acquired in the eleventh battle has led me to believe that we should fare far worse in the twelfth. My commanders and brave troops have decided that such an unfortunate situation might be anticipated by an offensive. We have not the necessary means as regards troops."

=== Tunnel warfare in the mountains ===
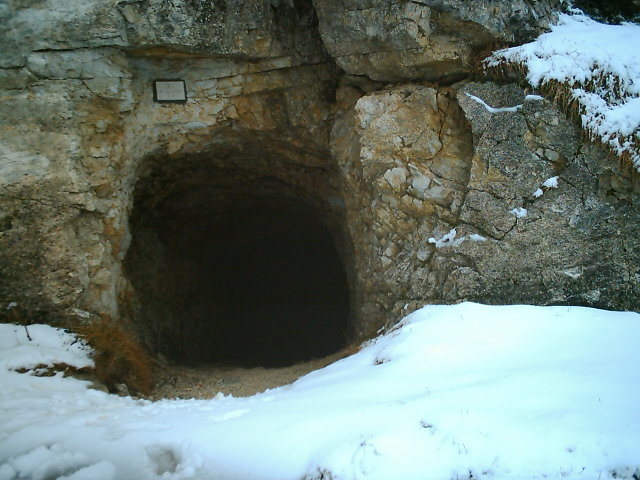
A mine gallery in the ice at Pasubio

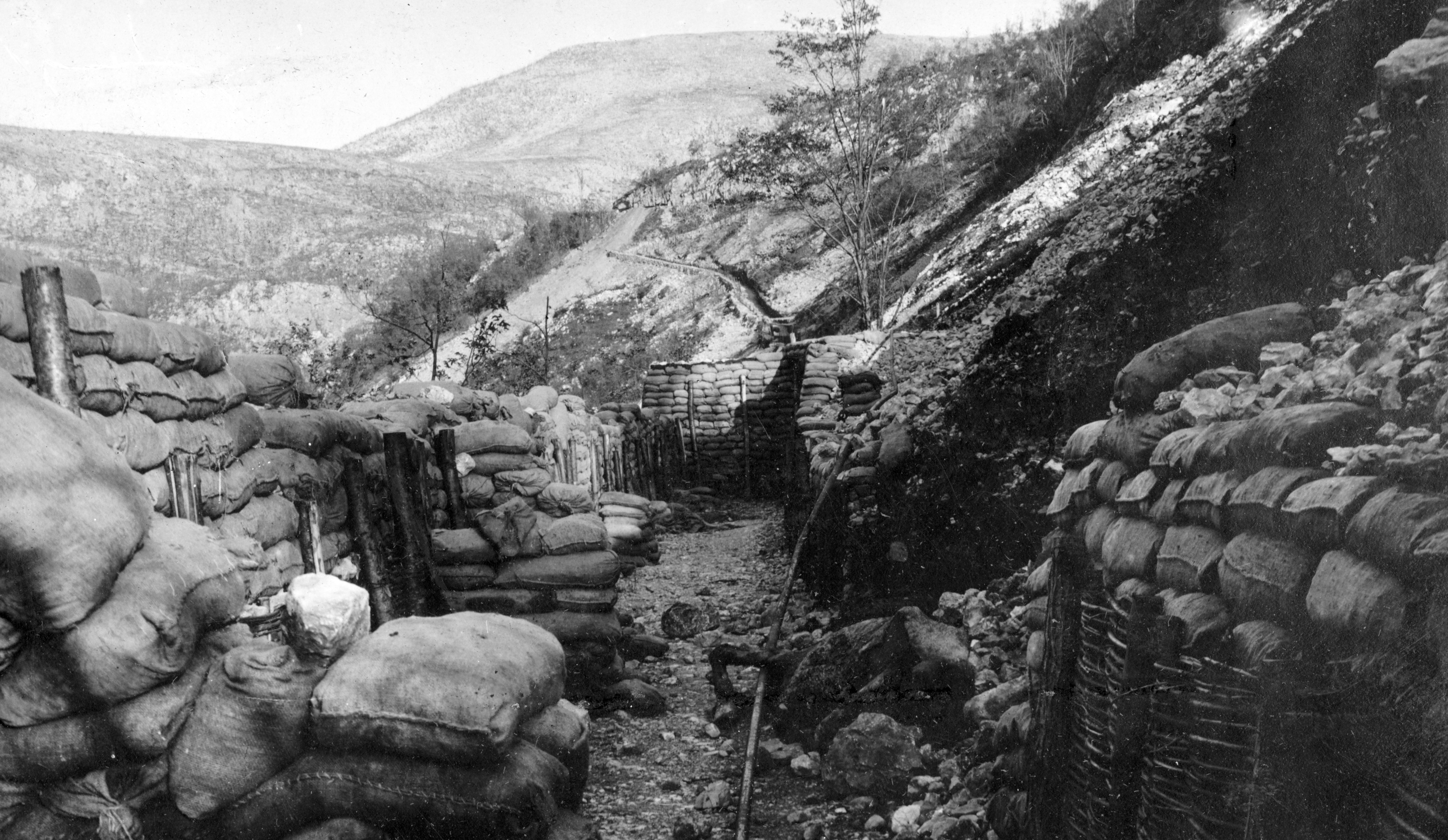
Trenches at the mount Škabrijel in 1917

From 1915, the high peaks of the Dolomites range were an area of fierce mountain warfare. In order to protect their soldiers from enemy fire and the hostile alpine environment, both Austro-Hungarian and Italian military engineers constructed fighting tunnels which offered a degree of cover and allowed better logistics support. Working at high altitudes in the hard carbonate rock of the Dolomites, often in exposed areas near mountain peaks and even in glacial ice, required extreme skill of both Austro-Hungarian and Italian miners.

Beginning on the 13th, later referred to as White Friday, December 1916 would see 10,000 soldiers on both sides killed by avalanches in the Dolomites. Numerous avalanches were caused by the Italians and Austro-Hungarians purposefully firing artillery shells on the mountainside, while others were naturally caused.

In addition to building underground shelters and covered supply routes for their soldiers like the Italian Strada delle 52 Gallerie, both sides also attempted to break the stalemate of trench warfare by tunneling under no man's land and placing explosive charges beneath the enemy's positions. Between 1 January 1916 and 13 March 1918, Austro-Hungarian and Italian units fired a total of 34 mines in this theatre of the war. Focal points of the underground fighting were Pasubio with 10 mines, Lagazuoi with 5, Col di Lana/Monte Sief also with 5, and Marmolada with 4 mines. The explosive charges ranged from 110 to 50,000 kilograms (240–110,230 pounds) of blasting gelatin. In April 1916, the Italians detonated explosives under the peaks of Col Di Lana, killing numerous Austro-Hungarians.

=== 1917: Germany arrives on the front ===
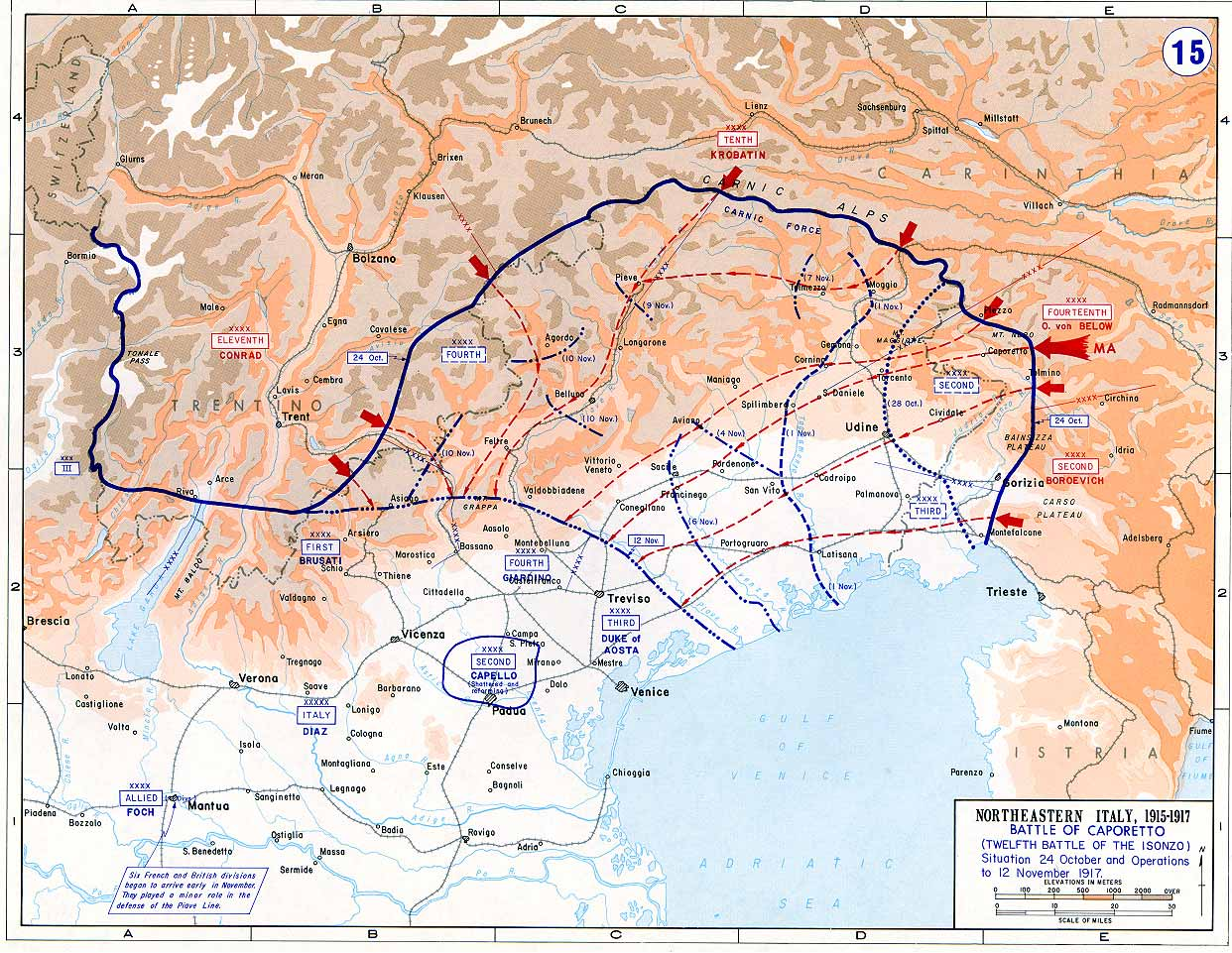
The Battle of Caporetto

The Italians directed a two-pronged attack against the Austrian lines north and east of Gorizia. The Austrians checked the advance east, but Italian forces under Luigi Capello managed to break the Austrian lines and capture the Banjšice Plateau. Characteristic of nearly every other theater of the war, the Italians found themselves on the verge of victory but could not secure it because their supply lines could not keep up with the front-line troops and they were forced to withdraw. However, the Italians despite suffering heavy casualties had almost exhausted and defeated the Austro-Hungarian army on the front, forcing them to call in German help for the much anticipated Caporetto Offensive.

The Austro-Hungarians received desperately needed reinforcements after the Eleventh Battle of the Isonzo from German Army soldiers rushed in after the Russian offensive ordered by Kerensky of July 1917 failed. Also arrived German troops from Romanian front after the Battle of Mărășești. The Germans introduced infiltration tactics to the Austro-Hungarian front and helped work on a new offensive. Meanwhile, mutinies and plummeting morale crippled the Italian Army from within. The soldiers lived in poor conditions and engaged in attack after attack that often yielded minimal or no military gain.

On 24 October 1917 the Austro-Hungarians and Germans launched the Battle of Caporetto (Italian name for Kobarid or Karfreit in German). Chlorine-arsenic agent and diphosgene gas shells were fired as part of a huge artillery barrage, followed by infantry using infiltration tactics, bypassing enemy strong points and attacking on the Italian rear. At the end of the first day, the Italians had retreated 19 kilometres (12 miles) to the Tagliamento River.

When the Austro-Hungarian offensive routed the Italians, the new Italian chief of staff, Armando Diaz ordered to stop their retreat and defend the fortified defenses around the Monte Grappa summit between the Roncone and the Tomatico mountains; although numerically inferior (51,000 against 120,000) the Italian Army managed to halt the Austro-Hungarian and German armies in the First Battle of Monte Grappa.

=== 1918: The war ends ===
==== Second Battle of the Piave River (June 1918) ====
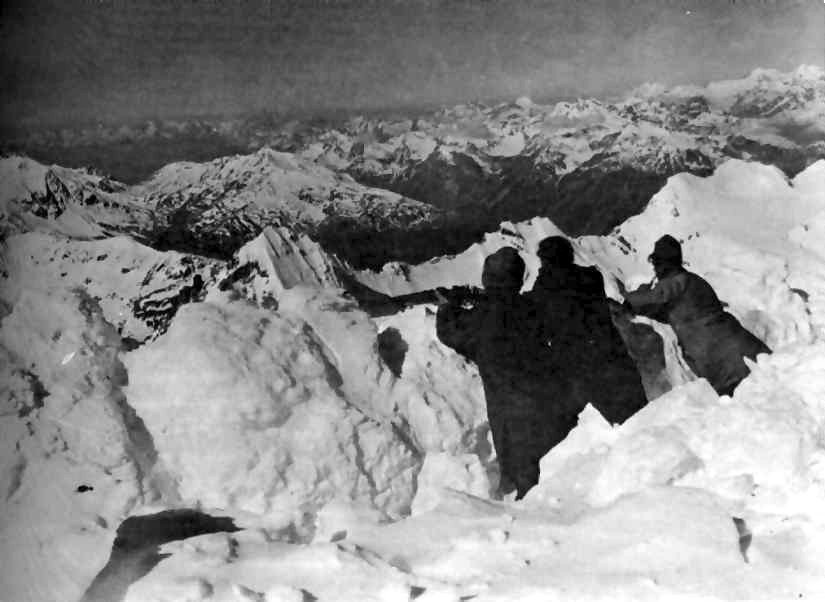
Austro-Hungarian trench in Ortler Alps, 1917

Advancing deep and fast, the Austro-Hungarians outran their supply lines, which forced them to stop and regroup. The Italians, pushed back to defensive lines near Venice on the Piave River, had suffered 600,000 casualties to this point in the war. Because of these losses, the Italian Government called to arms the so-called 99 Boys (Ragazzi del '99); the new class of conscripts born in 1899 who were turning 18 in 1917. In November 1917, British and French troops started to bolster the front line, from the 5 and 6 divisions respectively provided. (Note: The French units were (i) 12th Army Corps (France) (ii) 10th Army (France) and (iii) 31st Army Corps (France) comprising (1) 23rd Division, 24th Division, (2) 46th Division, 47th Division and (3) 64th Division, 65th Division respectively.) Far more decisive to the war effort than their troops was the Allies economic assistance by providing strategic materials (steel, coal and crops – provided by the British but imported from Argentina – etc.), which Italy always lacked sorely. In the spring of 1918, Germany pulled out its troops for use in its upcoming Spring Offensive on the Western Front. As a result of the Spring Offensive, Britain and France also pulled half of their divisions back to the Western Front.

The Austro-Hungarians now began debating how to finish the war in Italy. The Austro-Hungarian generals disagreed on how to administer the final offensive. Archduke Joseph August of Austria decided for a two-pronged offensive, where it would prove impossible for the two forces to communicate in the mountains.

The Second Battle of the Piave River began with a diversionary attack near the Tonale Pass named Lawine, which the Italians repulsed after two days of fighting. Austrian deserters betrayed the objectives of the upcoming offensive, which allowed the Italians to move two armies directly in the path of the Austrian prongs. The other prong, led by general Svetozar Boroević von Bojna initially experienced success until aircraft bombed their supply lines and Italian reinforcements arrived.

==== The decisive Battle of Vittorio Veneto (October–November 1918) ====
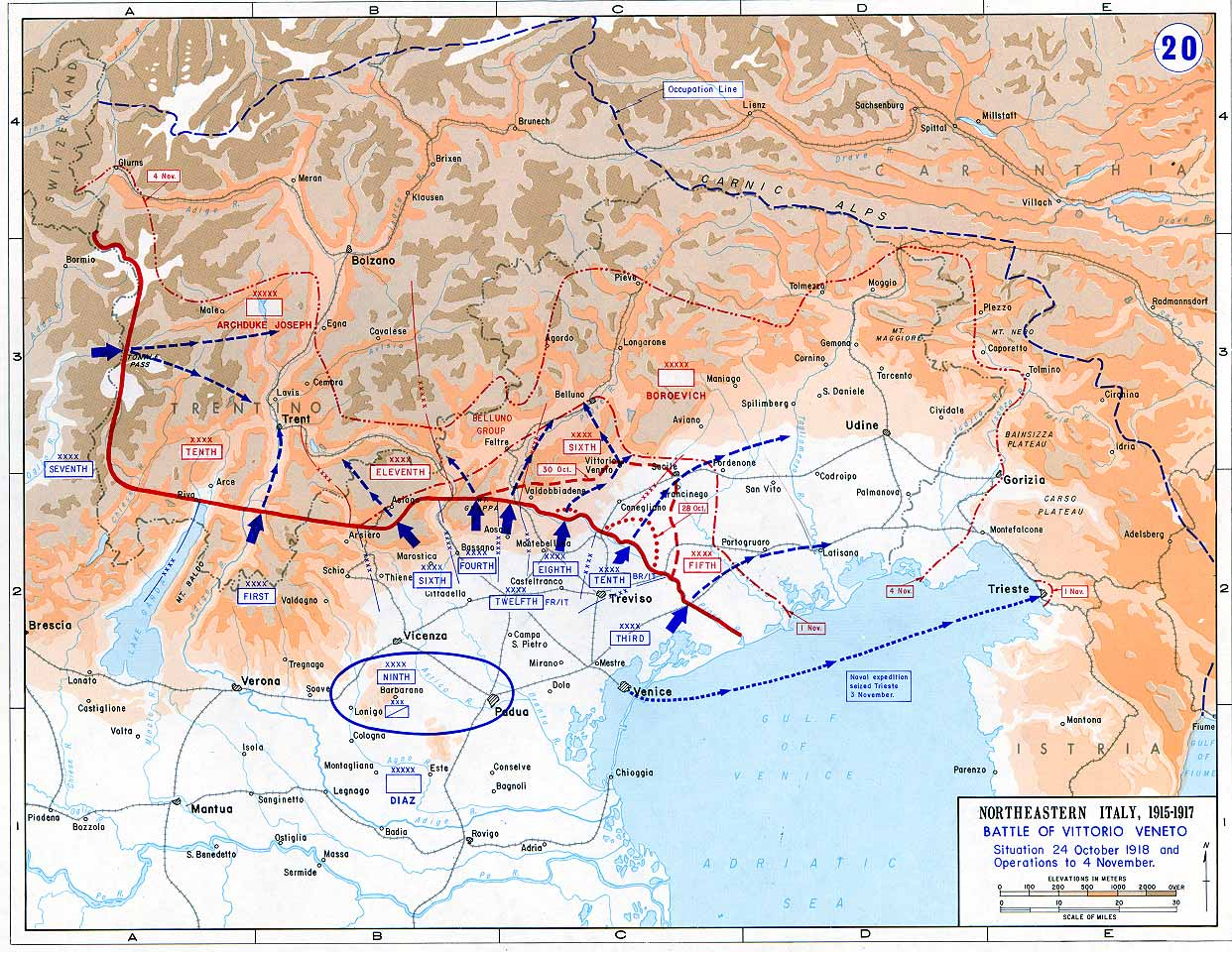
The Italian front in 1918 and the Battle of Vittorio Veneto

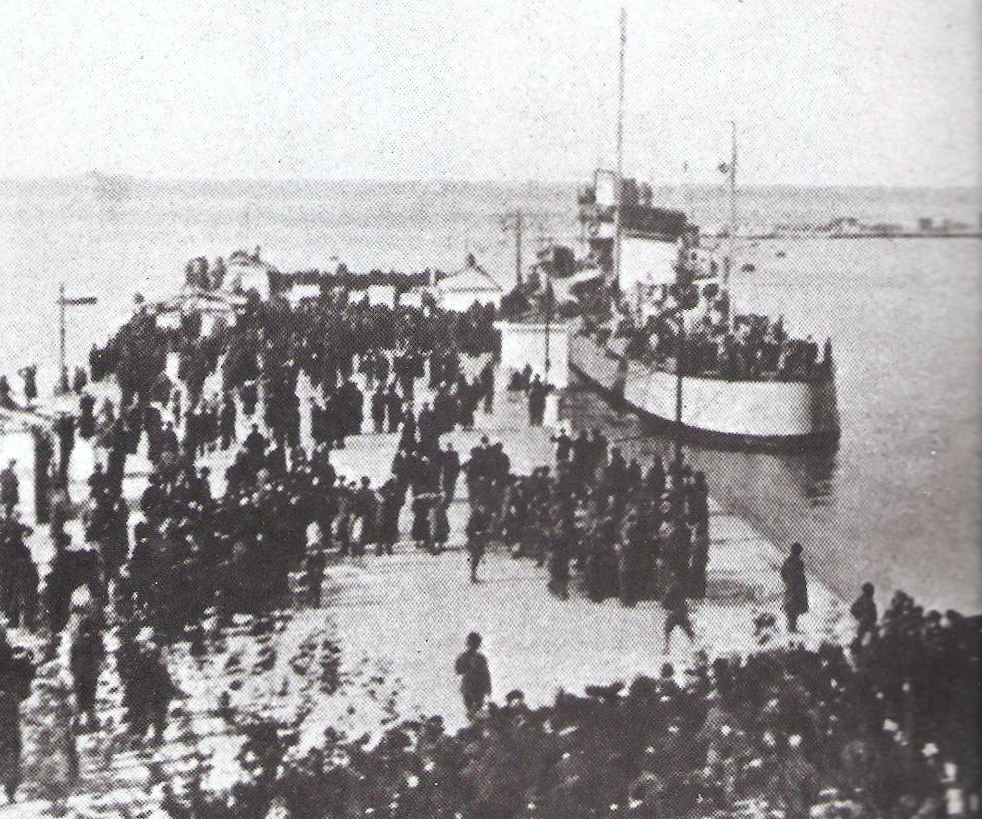
Italian troops landing in Trieste, 3 November 1918, after the victorious Battle of Vittorio Veneto. The Italian victory in this battle marked the end of the war on the Italian Front, secured the dissolution of the Austro-Hungarian Empire and contributed to the end of World War I just one week later.

To the disappointment of Italy's allies, no counter-offensive followed the Battle of Piave. The Italian Army had suffered huge losses in the battle, and considered an offensive dangerous. General Armando Diaz waited for more reinforcements to arrive from the Western Front. By the end of October 1918, Austro-Hungary was in a dire situation. Czechoslovakia, Croatia, and Slovenia proclaimed their independence and parts of their troops started deserting, disobeying orders and retreating. Many Czechoslovak troops, in fact, started working for the Allied Cause, and in September 1918, five Czechoslovak Regiments were formed in the Italian Army.

By October 1918, Italy finally had enough soldiers to mount an offensive. The attack targeted Vittorio Veneto, across the Piave. The Italian Army broke through a gap near Sacile and poured in reinforcements that crushed the Austro-Hungarian defensive line. On 31 October, the Italian Army launched a full scale attack and the whole front began to collapse. On 3 November, 300,000 Austro-Hungarian soldiers surrendered, at the same day the Italians entered Trento and Trieste, greeted by the population.

On 3 November, the military leaders of the already disintegrated Austria-Hungary sent a flag of truce to the Italian commander to ask again for an armistice and terms of peace. The terms were arranged by telegraph with the Allied authorities in Paris, communicated to the Austro-Hungarian commander, and were accepted. The Armistice with Austria was signed in the Villa Giusti, near Padua, on 3 November, and took effect at three o'clock in the afternoon of 4 November. Austria and Hungary signed separate armistices following the overthrow of the Habsburg monarchy and the collapse of the Austro-Hungarian Empire.

=== Casualties ===
Italian military deaths numbered 834 senior officers and generals, 16,872 junior officers, 16,302 non-commissioned officers, and 497,103 enlisted men, for a total of over 531,000 dead (including those who died as POWs or who were declared dead after going missing). Of these, 257,418 men came from Northern Italy, 117,480 from Central Italy, and 156,251 from Southern Italy. While the confirmed death numbers of Italian soldiers on the front in 1915 were 66,090 killed, in 1916 this figure was 118,880 killed, in 1917 it was 152,790 killed, and in 1918 it stood at 40,250 killed soldiers. Another breakdown of fatalities gives 237,353 killed in action, 106,000 died of disease (59,000 in the operating army and 47,000 in the territorial army), 81,430 missing later declared dead, 12,036 accidental deaths, and some 90,000 deaths of prisoners of war in Austro-Hungarian captivity (mostly from disease). An additional 946,640 men were wounded. Excess Italian civilian deaths due to privations and military action are estimated at about 600,000, most of them related to the Spanish flu epidemic.

Austro-Hungarian KIAs (this category does not include soldiers who perished in the rear or as POWs) amounted to 4,538 officers and 150,812 soldiers, for a total of 155,350 dead. The losses were increasing over time; there were 31,135 killed in 1915, 38,519 in 1916, 42,309 in 1917 and 43,387 in 1918. While in 1915 killed-in-action fatalities on the Italian front constituted 18% of all Austro-Hungarian KIAs, in 1916 this figure was 41%, in 1917 it was 64%, and in 1918 it stood at 84%. Overall and excluding those who perished as prisoners, 1.2 million Austro-Hungarian soldiers died and 3.62 million were wounded during World War I. About one-third of these losses were incurred on the Italian Front, for a total of about 400,000 dead and 1,200,000 wounded.

=== Occupation of Dalmatia, Istria, Trentino and Tyrol ===
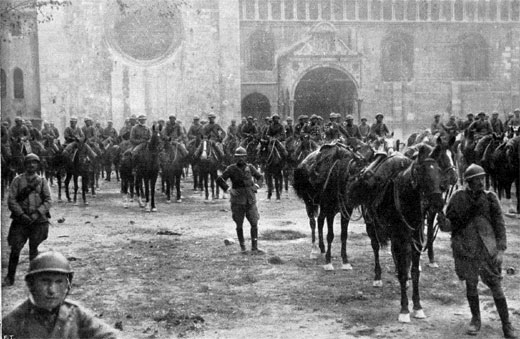
Italian cavalry in Trento on 3 November 1918, after the victorious Battle of Vittorio Veneto

Italian soldiers entered Trento while Bersaglieri landed from the sea in Trieste. The following day the Istrian cities of Rovigno and Parenzo, the Dalmatian islands of Lissa and Lagosta, and the cities of Zara and Fiume were occupied: the latter was not included in the territories originally promised secretly by the Allies to Italy in case of victory, but the Italians decided to intervene in reply to a local National Council, formed after the flight of the Hungarians, and which had announced the union to the Kingdom of Italy. The Regia Marina occupied Pola, Sebenico and Zara, which became the capital of the Governorate of Dalmatia.The Governorate of Dalmatia had the provisional aim of ferrying the territory towards full integration into the Kingdom of Italy, progressively importing national legislation in place of the previous one. The Governorate of Dalmatia was evacuated following the Italo-Yugoslav agreements which resulted in the Treaty of Rapallo (1920). Italy occupied also Innsbruck and all Tyrol by the III Corps of the First Army with 20–22,000 soldiers.

=== Aftermath ===
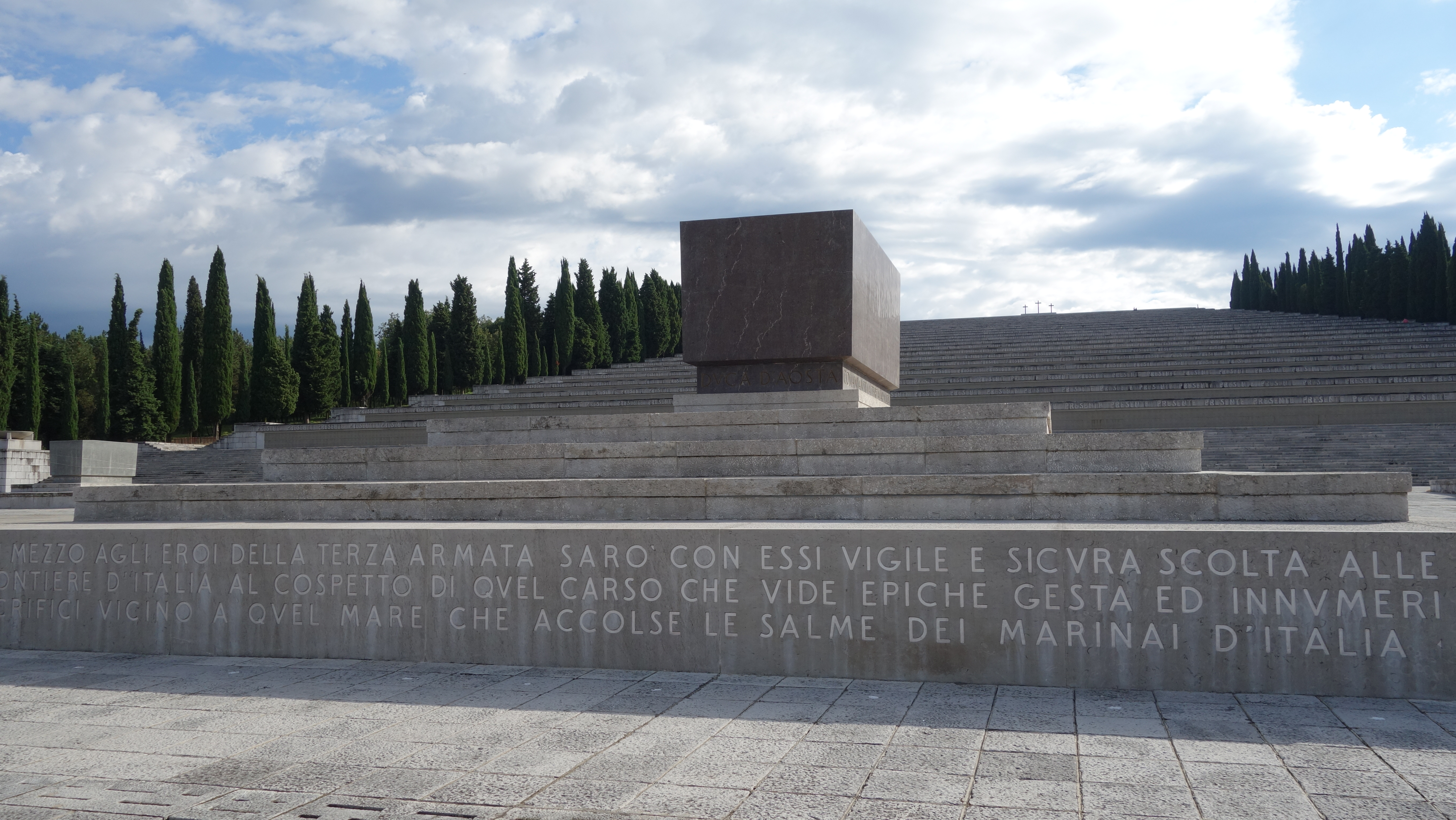
The Redipuglia War Memorial of Redipuglia, with the tomb of Prince Emanuele Filiberto, Duke of Aosta in the foreground, nicknamed the Undefeated Duke for having reported numerous victories in the First World War without ever being defeated on the battlefield

As the war came to an end, Italian Prime Minister Vittorio Emanuele Orlando met with British Prime Minister David Lloyd George, President of Council of France Georges Clemenceau and United States President Woodrow Wilson in Versailles to discuss how the borders of Europe should be redefined to help avoid a future European war. The talks provided little territorial gain to Italy as Wilson promised freedom to all European nationalities to form their nation-states. As a result, the Treaty of Versailles did not assign Dalmatia and Albania to Italy as had been promised. Furthermore, the British and French decided to divide the German overseas colonies into their mandates, with Italy receiving none. Italy also gained no territory from the breakup of the Ottoman Empire. Despite this, Orlando agreed to sign the Treaty of Versailles, which caused uproar against his government. The Treaty of Saint-Germain-en-Laye (1919) and the Treaty of Rapallo (1920) allowed the annexation of Trentino Alto-Adige, Julian March, Istria, Kvarner as well as the Dalmatian city of Zara.

Furious over the peace settlement, the Italian nationalist poet Gabriele D'Annunzio led disaffected war veterans and nationalists to form the Free State of Fiume in September 1919. His popularity among nationalists led him to be called Il Duce ("The Leader"), and he used black-shirted paramilitary in his assault on Fiume. The leadership title of Duce and the blackshirt paramilitary uniform would later be adopted by the fascist movement of Benito Mussolini. The demand for the Italian annexation of Fiume spread to all sides of the political spectrum.

The subsequent Treaty of Rome (1924) led to the annexation of the city of Fiume to Italy. Italy's lack of territorial gain led to the outcome being denounced as a mutilated victory. The rhetoric of mutilated victory was adopted by Mussolini and led to the rise of Italian fascism, becoming a key point in the propaganda of Fascist Italy. Historians regard mutilated victory as a "political myth", used by fascists to fuel Italian imperialism and obscure the successes of liberal Italy in the aftermath of World War I. Italy also gained a permanent seat in the League of Nations's executive council.

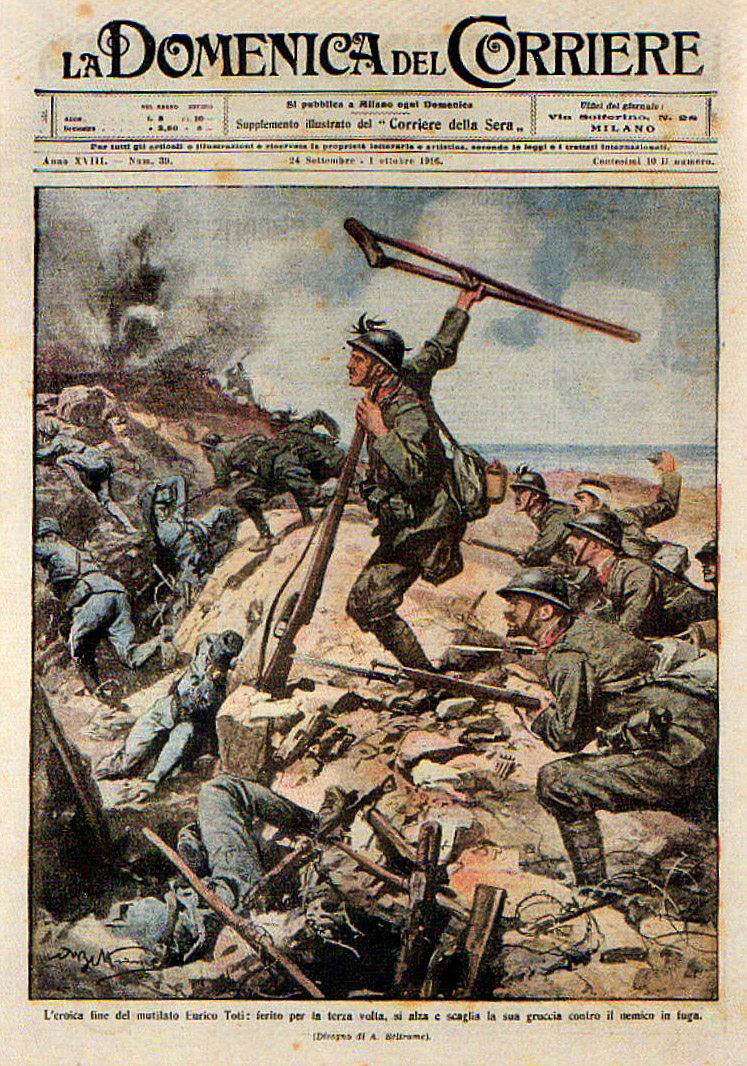
Enrico Toti, Italian patriot and hero of World War I. From Italian weekly La Domenica del Corriere, 24 September 1916.

Italian propaganda poster in 1917

== Order of Battle as of 24 May 1915 ==
The armies below are listed based on their deployments along the front from the Stelvio Pass in the West to the Adriatic Sea in the East:

- High Command — Lieutenant General Luigi Cadorna
  - VIII Army Corps
  - X Army Corps
  - XIII Army Corps
  - XIV Army Corps
  - Carnia Zone Command — held the front in the Carnic Alps between the 4th Army and 2nd Army
  - 1st Army, HQ in Verona — deployed from the Stelvio Pass to Rolle Pass
    - III Army Corps
    - V Army Corps
  - 4th Army, HQ in Vittorio Veneto — deployed from Rolle Pass to the Carnic Alps
    - III Army Corps
    - I Army Corps
    - IX Army Corps
  - 2nd Army, HQ in Cividale del Friuli — deployed along the upper Isonzo river from Bovec to Prepotto
    - II Army Corps
    - IV Army Corps
    - XII Army Corps
  - 3rd Army, HQ in Cervignano del Friuli — deployed along the lower Isonzo river from Prepotto to the Adriatic Sea
    - VI Army Corps
    - VII Army Corps
    - XI Army Corps

== See also ==
- Austro-Hungarian fortifications on the Italian border
- Museum of the White War in Adamello - located in Temù, in the Upper Val Camonica.

== Sources ==
- Cassar, George H. (1998). The Forgotten Front: The British Campaign in Italy, 1917–1918. London: Continuum International Publishing Group. ISBN 1-85285-166-X.
- Clodfelter, M. (2017). Warfare and Armed Conflicts: A Statistical Encyclopedia of Casualty and Other Figures, 1492-2015 (4th ed.). Jefferson, North Carolina: McFarland. ISBN 978-0786474707.
- Edmonds, J. E.; Davies, Sir Henry Rodolph (1949). Military Operations: Italy 1915–1919. History of the Great War based on Official Documents by Direction of the Committee of Imperial Defence. Maps in rear cover folder. London: HMSO. OCLC 4839237 – via Archive Foundation.
- Erlikman, Vadim (2004). Poteri narodonaseleniia v XX veke : spravochnik. Moscow: Русская панорама. ISBN 5-93165-107-1.
- Etschmann, Wolfgang: "Die Südfront 1915–1918". In: Klaus Eisterer, Rolf Steininger (eds.): Tirol und der Erste Weltkrieg. (= Innsbrucker Forschungen zur Zeitgeschichte, Band 12), Vienna/Innsbruck 1995, pp. 27–60
- Glaise von Horstenau, Edmund (1932). Österreich-Ungarns letzter Krieg 1914–1918. Vienna: Verl. der Militärwiss. Mitteilungen.
- Keegan, John (1998). The First World War. London: Random House (UK). ISBN 0-09-1801788.
- Keegan, John (2001). The First World War: An Illustrated History. London: Hutchinson. ISBN 0-09-179392-0.
- Mortara, G (1925). La Salute pubblica in Italia durante e dopo la Guerra. New Haven: Yale University Press.
- Nicolle, David (2003). The Italian Army of World War I. Osprey Publishing. ISBN 1-84176-398-5.
- Page, Thomas Nelson (1920). Italy and the World War. New York, Charles Scribner's Sons, Full Text Available Online.
- Pompé, Daniel; et al., eds. (1924). Les armées françaises dans la Grande guerre. Tome X. 1er Volume. Ordres de bataille des grandes unités - Groupes D'Armées, Armées, Corps d'Armées. Ministère De la Guerre, Etat-Major de l'Armée - Service Historique (in French) (1st ed.). Paris: Imprimerie Nationale.
- Thompson, Mark (2008). The White War: Life and Death on the Italian Front, 1915–1919. London: Faber and Faber. ISBN 978-0-465-01329-6.
