= Ms. Scrooge =

1997 television film directed by John Korty

- Based on: A Christmas Carol by Charles Dickens
- Written by: John McGreevey
- Directed by: John Korty
- Starring: Cicely Tyson; Katherine Helmond; Michael Beach
- Music by: David Shire
- Countries of origin: United States; Canada
- Original language: English

Production
- Producer: Julian Marks
- Cinematography: Elemér Ragályi
- Editor: Louise A. Innes
- Running time: 87 minutes
- Production company: Wilshire Court Productions

Original release
- Network: USA Network
- Release: December 10, 1997

Ms. Scrooge is a 1997 American made-for-television Christmas fantasy drama film starring Cicely Tyson and Katherine Helmond and is an adaptation of Charles Dickens's 1843 novella A Christmas Carol. The film changes the roles of Ebenezer Scrooge and Jacob Marley into female counterparts. The film is also notable for mentioning that Tiny Tim is dying of a "slow-growing congenital tumor", instead of an unnamed condition. The film's setting is changed from London to Providence, Rhode Island. It originally aired on USA Network on December 10, 1997.

== Plot ==
It is December in Providence, Rhode Island. Elderly miser Ebenita Scrooge has spent years climbing to the top while shutting everyone out of her life, especially around Christmas. She owns a savings-and-loan firm, and is ruthless when it comes to business: she underpays her employees and refuses to give them health coverage or any other benefits, gives a patron, (who's in the process of raising bail for her son), a meager value for an antique lamp and coldly evicts a whole family from one of her properties for falling behind in the rent. Ebenita holds a distant relationship with Luke, the reverend at the local church, and the son of her late younger brother Perry, despite him being Ebenita's only immediate relative.

Returning home on Christmas Eve, Ebenita encounters the ghost of Maude Marley, her late mentor and former partner, who was also the founder and original owner of Ebenita's firm. Maude explains that she has been condemned to wander the Earthly plain, while bound with chains forged by her greed in life, as punishment for the shrewd selfishness and greed which drove her in life, and for leading Ebenita onto the same path. For the sake of both of their souls, Ebenita must learn from Maude's and her own mistakes, and change her own ways for the better. Ebenita will be visited by three ghosts who will show her where she has gone wrong in life and the necessary changes she must make in order to avoid Maude's eternal suffering. After Maude leaves, a spooked Ebenita locks herself in the vault at her own firm, in order to keep the ghosts out, but this does not work.

The Ghost of Christmas Past appears at midnight and takes Ebenita back to her childhood in the Deep South. Ebenita was a bright girl, particularly gifted at math. She and Perry grew up in the happy household of their father, Army veteran George, and his wife Clara. George, along with two Army buddies, aspired to open a grocery store, despite white opposition and a lack of opportunities for African-Americans. Trouble ensued when both of George's partners backed out of the arrangement; one moved up north for better job opportunities and more of them, while the other started his own laundromat. Determined to keep the building where he planned to open his store, George used the family savings and a few loans to pay the rent in advance. He also cut costs as best he could, while seeking new partners. One night, the building was firebombed and George was killed after rushing in to extinguish it. Devastated and broke, the Scrooges were forced to sell their family home in order to pay off their debts. 15 years later, shortly after their mother's death, Ebenita sought employment in Providence while Perry, following in their father's footsteps, married his high-school girlfriend and joined the Army. While Perry was shipped off to Vietnam, Ebenita angled for an internship at Maude's savings-and-loan firm. Maude was impressed and hired her. Ebenita also found love with Steven, a young lawyer who was also from the Deep South. Maude promoted her to head bookkeeper and raises her salary. Ebenita and Steven planned to marry, but their engagement fell apart when Steven planned on returning to the South; wanting to aid the plight of the black community, but Ebenita was too fearful of living broke and "at the bottom" again. Not long after she and Steven went their separate ways, Perry died in Vietnam, leaving behind his wife and son Luke.

Waking up, Ebenita returns home. There, shortly after 1:00 a.m., she encounters the Ghost of Christmas Present, who takes her to learn more about the people in her life. She finds that her head clerk, Bob Cratchit, and his family are happy in spite of their poverty; they are grateful to Ebenita, despite her miserliness. However, the family has much to worry about: Bob's son Tim suffers from a slow-growing, congenital tumor that will eventually kill him. The family can't afford the treatment he needs to survive, which is why Bob asked Ebenita about medical health plans. When Ebenita wonders why they haven't gone to public agencies for help, the Ghost reveals that they have many times, only to be rejected because of Bob's salary from her, which is too high to qualify for welfare, and yet too low to cover the necessary surgery for Tim. The Ghost shows Ebenita that kindness can come from anyone, anywhere, at any time: the family she evicted is being put up in the gymnasium at their children's school for the Christmas vacation. Finally, the Ghost takes Ebenita to Luke's church; she finds him giving a sermon about the difference between heaven and hell, using a variation on the allegory of the long spoons.

After waking up again, Ebenita attempts to prepare for bed. As she is doing so, at 2.00 a.m., she encounters the silent Ghost of Christmas Future, who shows her what will become of herself and everyone around her should she not change her ways. Ebenita sees that, without treatment, Tim has become critically ill, and she has fired Bob for going AWOL to care for his son. When Luke learns of this, he confronts Ebenita at her firm; when he can't convince his aunt to do the right thing - which will save both Tim's life and her own soul - he berates Ebenita for her selfish and miserly ways, still to no avail. In the heat of their argument, she suffers a heart attack without warning. When Luke struggles to calm her down, she angrily demands that he leave. After he does, Annie, another clerk, offers to put the day's receipts away in the vault for Ebenita, but is harshly refused by her. Unfortunately, her heart is unable to take the strain when she tries to do it herself and she collapses while in the vault. Annie hears this but, too fearful for her job to even check on Ebenita, departs. Following her death, Ebenita's firm is permanently shut down. Since she has left no will, her entire fortune is seized by the government - for probate, back taxes, and legal fees. Her funeral is sparsely attended (by Luke, his wife, and Bob), short, and uneventful. Tim dies from his ailment, surrounded by family, and with Luke holding his hand. Resolving to change her ways and thus avert this terrible future, Ebenita begs the Ghost for an opportunity to set everything right.

Waking up in her own room on Christmas Day, a loving and joyous Ebenita determines to make the most of her second chance. She surprises Bob's family with a turkey dinner, and handsomely pays the delivery boy. Ebenita returns the antique lamp she bought to its owner, free of charge, and herself bails the owner's son out of jail. She offers to sponsor the local homeless shelter. Visiting the Cratchit residence, she gives Bob a well-deserved raise and promotes him to vice-president of her firm. She gifts him, and her entire savings-and-loan staff, with excellent medical health plans, and presents Tim with a puppy and the other children with mechanical toys that Ebenita previously used as coin banks. Finally, Ebenita attends Luke's church for Christmas service, and also to meet his daughter, much to the family's delight.

== Cast ==
- Cicely Tyson as Ebenita Scrooge
- Katherine Helmond as Maude Marley
- Michael Beach as Reverend Luke Scrooge
- John Bourgeois as Bob Cratchit
- William Greenblatt as Tim Cratchit
- Michael J. Reynolds as the Ghost of Christmas Past
- Shaun Austin-Olsen as the Ghost of Christmas Present
- Julian Richings as the Ghost of Christmas Future

== Reception ==
According to Yelyzaveta Tretiakova of Screen Rant, Ms. Scrooge was "by far" the worst adaptation of A Christmas Carol when taking audience rankings from IMDB. Tretiakova stated that "Though the movie attempted to approach the story in a new and never-before-seen way, it failed at being original or at least somewhat good." She concluded by saying the amount of alterations made could have been the reason for its poor performance. Although the movie as a whole may have received negative feedback, Ryan Heffernan from Collider praised Cicely Tyson's portrayal of Scrooge as "touching and delicate".

== See also ==
- List of Christmas films
- List of A Christmas Carol adaptations
