= Ugnė =

Female given name

- Gender: female

Origin
- Origin: Lithuanian
- Meaning: "fire"
- Region of origin: Lithuania

Ugnė is a female given name currently popular in Lithuania, where it was the third most popular name given to baby girls in 2010. It means "fire" in Lithuanian.

== Person named Ugnė ==
- Ugnė Karvelis (1935–2002), Lithuanian writer, a translator and a member of the UNESCO Executive Board
- Ugnė Mažutaitytė (born 1997), Lithuanian swimmer
