= Kęstutis Krasauskas =

Lithuanian artist and sculptor

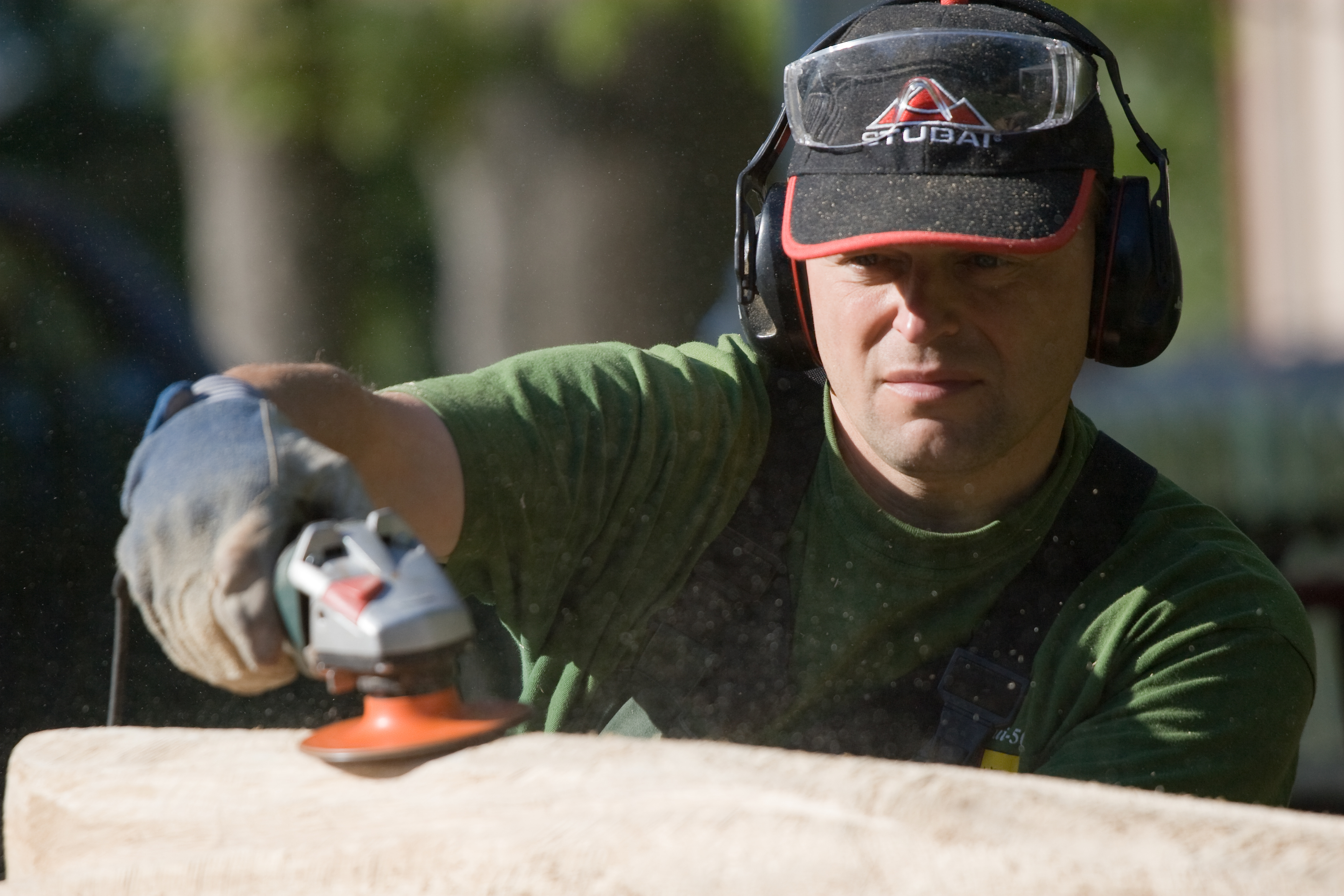
Sculptor Kęstutis Krasauskas

Kęstutis Krasauskas (born September 14, 1968, Panevežys, Lithuania) is a Lithuanian artist and sculptor.

== Biography ==
In 1987, Krasauskas graduated from Kaunas applied arts technical school named after S.Žukas, specialising in decorative wood processing. After graduation, from 1988 to 1992 he worked at the Rumšiškės Open-air Ethnographic Museum.

From 1992 to 1996, Krasauskas studied sculpture at the Vilnius Academy of Arts and obtained a bachelor's degree in sculpture. His tutors were Mindaugas Šnipas, Gediminas Karalius and Konstantinas Bogdanas.

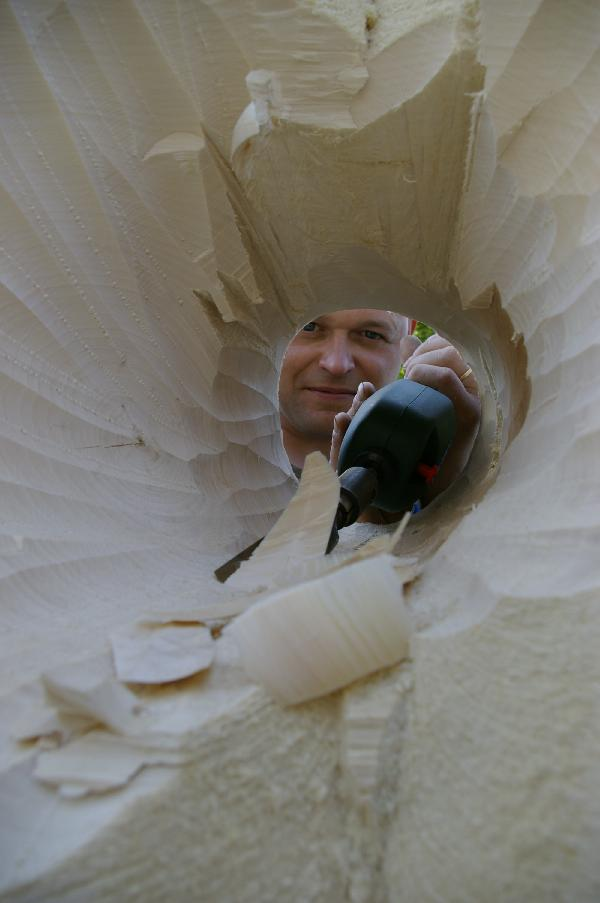

In 2002, Krasauskas graduated from Vilnius Academy of Arts with a master's degree.

He has participated in exhibitions and plein-airs since 1987.

His sculptures have been exhibited in Lithuania (in Vilnius, Kaunas, Panevėžys, Šiauliai, Pasvalys, Joniškis, Rokiškis, Biržai, Ukmergė, Palanga and Anykščiai), as well as in Denmark, Germany and Italy. He has also exhibited in the Seimas Parliament Houses of Lithuania.

He has participated in republican plein-airs in Rokiškis, Vilnius, Kupiškis, Anykščiai, Raseiniai, Kulautuva, Kėdainiai, Joniškis, Pakruojis, Varėna, Ramygala and Pasvalys.

He also took part in international woodwork sculpture exhibitions in:

- Plein-airs in Kupiškis, Lithuania 2006,
- St. Annaparochie in the Netherlands 2005,
- Wilkendorf in Germany 2008,
- Temù in Italy 2008, 2009, 2010, 2011,
- Rokiškis in Lithuania 2009,
- Joniškis in Lithuania 2011, 2012.
- Grimming-symposium, Irdning in Austria 2012.

Since 2003 Krasauskas he has been a member of the Pasvalys woodwork sculptures club "Šilo genys". Since 2004 he has been a member of the club "Rats" ("Around").

He has been the author and idea presenter of the tournament "a sculpture during 5 hours" which started in Pasvalys, Lithuania since 2003.

In 2024, by decree of the President of the Republic of Lithuania, he was awarded the Medal of the Order "For Merits to Lithuania".

Krasauskas work in his own studio, Sereikoniai village, Pumpėnai, Pasvalys region, Lithuania.

== Group exhibitions ==
- 2012 “Aukštaitijos dailė 2012. Perpetuum mobile”, in Panevėžys art gallery. Lithuania.
- 2012 Pasvalys art club "Rats"(Around) exhibitions in Pasvalys country museum. Lithuania.
- 2011 internacional wood sculptors exhibition in The Red synagogue, Joniškis. Lithuania.
- 2011 Pasvalys artists exhibition in Vilnius City Hall, Vilnius. Lithuania.
- 2008 “Talismanas”, in Panevėžys art gallery. Lithuania.
- 2008 group "Rats"(Around) exhibition in Anykščiai civil registry office. Lithuania.
- 2007 Pasvalys artists’ club’Rats’club exhibition in Lithuania Parliament Palace. Lithuania.
- 2007 group”Rats”(Around) exhibition in Palanga art gallery, J. Sliupas’ house. Lithuania.
- 2007 Wood sculptures exhibition in Kupiškis country museum. Lithuania.
- 2007 group “Rats”(Around) in Šiauliai art gallery. Lithuania.
- 2006 group “Rats”(Around) exhibition in Ukmergė culture centre. Lithuania.
- 2005 “Aukštaitijos dailė”, in Panevežys art gallery. Lithuania.
- 2005 Pasvalys artists’ club "Rats"(Around) club exhibition in “Galerija XX”, Panevėžys. Lithuania.
- 2004 group "Rats"(Around) exhibition in Biržai country museum. Lithuania.
- 2004 2005 2006 2007 2008 Pasvalys art club "Rats"(Around) exhibitions in Pasvalys country museum. Lithuania.
- 2001 2002 2003 republican competitive wooden sculptures exhibitions for L. Šepka’s remembrance. Lithuania.
- 1999 Mangers exhibition in Rokiskis country museum. Lithuania.
- 1996 Art academy students’ works exhibition Vilnius. Lithuania.
- 1995 Art academy students’ works exhibition Vilnius. Lithuania.
- 1992 in Gunds art gallery. Denmark.
- 1987. Young painters’ exhibition Kaunas. Lithuania.

== Symposiums, pleinairs ==
- 2017 Wood sculpture symposium "The Lithuanian Anthem", Garliava, Kaunas region, Lithuania.
- 2017 6th International symposium SØNDERBORG, Denmark.
- 2016 International symposium "LIGNUM SUMMER ART", Edolo(BS), Italy.
- 2016 5th International symposium SØNDERBORG, Denmark.
- 2015 4th International symposium SØNDERBORG, Denmark.
- 2015 International wood sculptures symposium "Etiuds of music", Antsla, Estonia.
- 2013, 2014, 2016, 2017 wood sculptures symposiums “Gamta-gėrio versmė”, Joniškis, Lithuania.
- 2013 10th International wood sculptures symposium-competition “ARTE IN STRADA”, Temù(BS), Italy.
- 2012 the fifteenth International wood and stone sculpture symposium "Grimming-Symposion 2012", Irdning, Austria.
- 2011, 2012 wood sculpture symposium "Legends of Varėna", Varėna city park, Varėna, Lithuania.
- 2011 plain-air “The angels”, Anykščiai, Lithuania.
- 2011 wood sculpture symposium in Deglėnai, Pasvalys region, Lithuania.
- 2011, 2012 Internacional wood sculpture symposiums "Gamta – gėrio versmė", Joniškis, Lithuania.
- 2011 mini plain-air "In Memoriam Jonas Tvardauskas", Horses museum, Niūronys, Anykščiai region, Lithuania.
- 2010, 2011 internacional wooden sculpture symposium-competition "Arte in strada", Temù(BS), Italy.
- 2010 wood sculpture symposium in Bistrampolis, Panevėžys region, Lithuania.
- 2009 international wood carving symposium in Rokiškis, Lithuania.
- 2009 the seventh internacional wooden sculpture symposium "Arte in strada", Temù(BS), Italy.
- 2008 the sixth internacional wooden sculpture symposium "Arte in strada", Temù(BS), Italy.
- 2008, 2009, 2010 wood sculpture symposiums "Gamta – gėrio versmė", Joniškis, Lithuania.
- 2008 the third international wood sculpture plain-air "Mittendrin- Zwishenraum und zwischenzeit", Wilkendorf in Germany.
- 2006 plain-air "Saulės mūšis- tai Pamūšis", Pamūšis, Pakruojis region, Lithuania.
- 2006 the third wooden sculpture plain-air, Kulautuva, Kaunas region, Lithuania.
- 2006 wood sculpture symposium in Jukainiai, Raseiniai region, Lithuania.
- 2006 wood sculpture symposium Horses museum, Niūronys, Anykščiai region, Lithuania.
- 2005 international wood sculpture symposium "Bild’t 500" St. Annaparochie in the Netherlands.
- 2005 wood sculpture symposium "Amatai" in Kėdainiai, Lithuania.
- 2005 wood sculpture Plain-air "Puoškim Joniškėlį", Joniškėlis, Pasvalio region, Lithuania.
- 2004 wood sculpture Plain-air in Vingis park, Vilnius, Lithuania.
- 2004, 2006 wood sculptures symposiums "Žmogus ir vanduo" in Kupiškis, Lithuania.
- 2003, 2004, 2005, 2006, 2007, 2008, 2010, 2011, 2012 wood sculptures symposiums "Šilo genys", Pasvalys, Lithuania.
- 2002, 2003, 2004, 2007, 2008, 2009 wood sculptures symposiums "Improvizacijos L. Šepkos gyvenimo ir kūrybos temomis", Rokiškis, Lithuania.
- 1992, 1993 wood sculpture symposiums in Ančiškiai forestry office, Kėdainiai region, Lithuania.
- 1987 wooden sculptures plain-air in Lampėdžiai, Kaunas, Lithuania.

== Rewards ==
- 2010 I Prize- International wooden sculpture symposium "Arte in strada", Temù(BS), Italy.
- 2003 special visitors‘ prize at wood carvers‘ competition of Lionginas Šepka, Rokiškis, Lithuania.
- 2016 III Prize International sculpture symposium "CAMPIONATO MONDIALE DI SCULTURA IN VELOCITA'", Edolo (BS), Italy.
