= Rumšiškės =

- Town
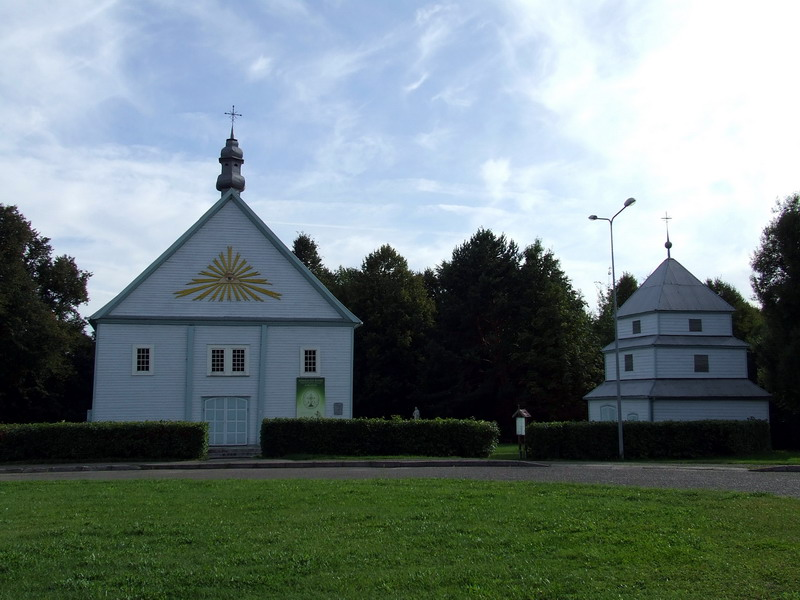
- St. Michael Archangel Church, Rumšiškės

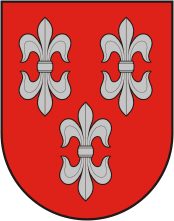
- Coat of arms

- Location of Rumšiškės
- Coordinates: 54°51′50″N 24°13′0″E
- Country: Lithuania
- Ethnographic region: Dzūkija
- County: Kaunas County
- Municipality: Kaišiadorys district municipality
- Eldership: Rumšiškės eldership
- Capital of: Rumšiškės eldership
- First mentioned: 1382

Population (2011)
  - Total: 1,651
- Time zone: UTC+2 (EET)
  - Summer (DST): UTC+3 (EEST)

Rumšiškės is a Lithuanian town (population 1,700), situated 20 km (12 mi) east of Kaunas on the northern bank of Kaunas Reservoir. Southern part of the town (including the birthplace of Lithuanian poet Jonas Aistis) is now under the waters of the artificial lake. The 18th century St. Michael Archangel church of Rumšiškės (rebuilt in the 19th century) was saved and moved to its present place in 1958, when the reservoir was created.

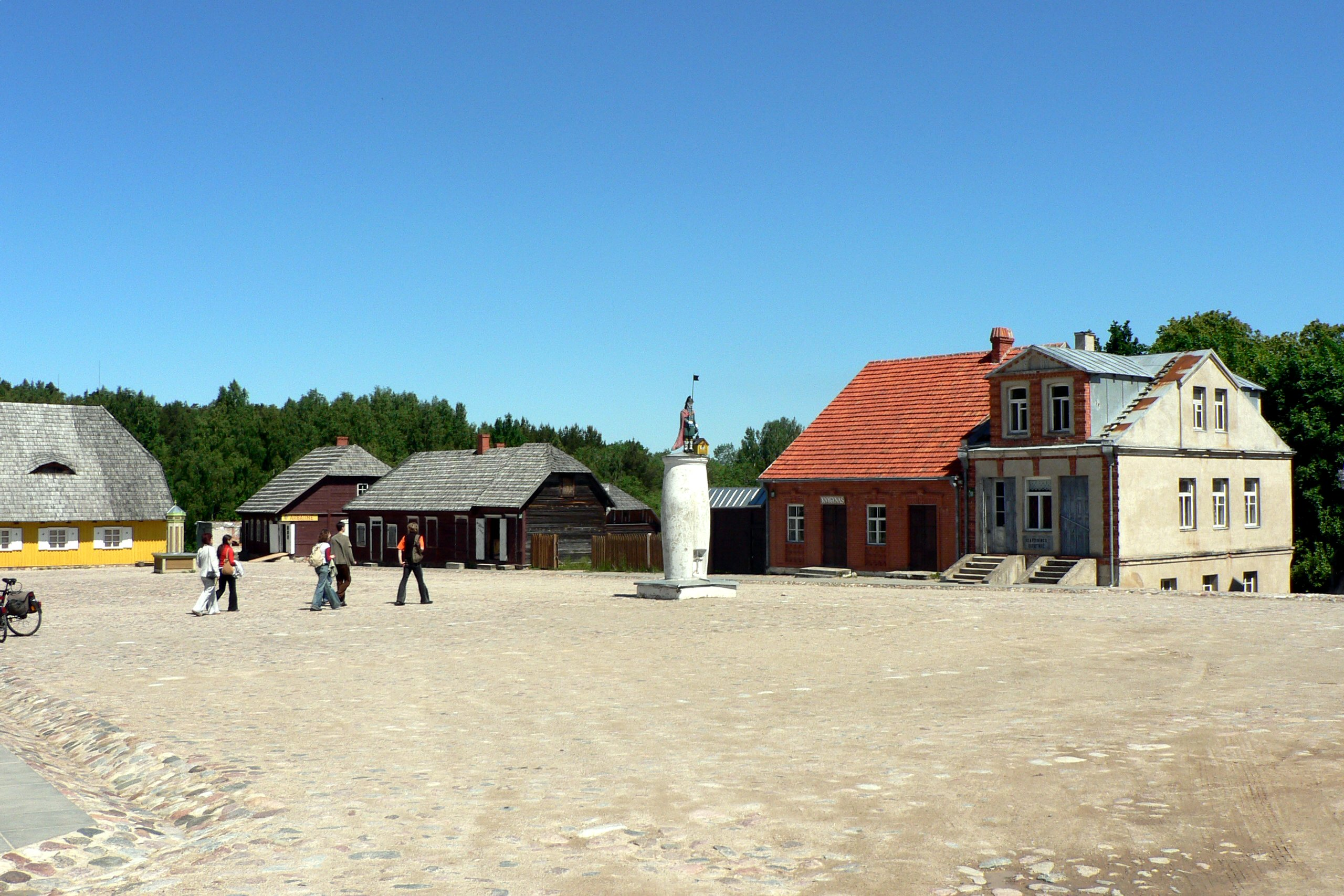
Town square in the museum

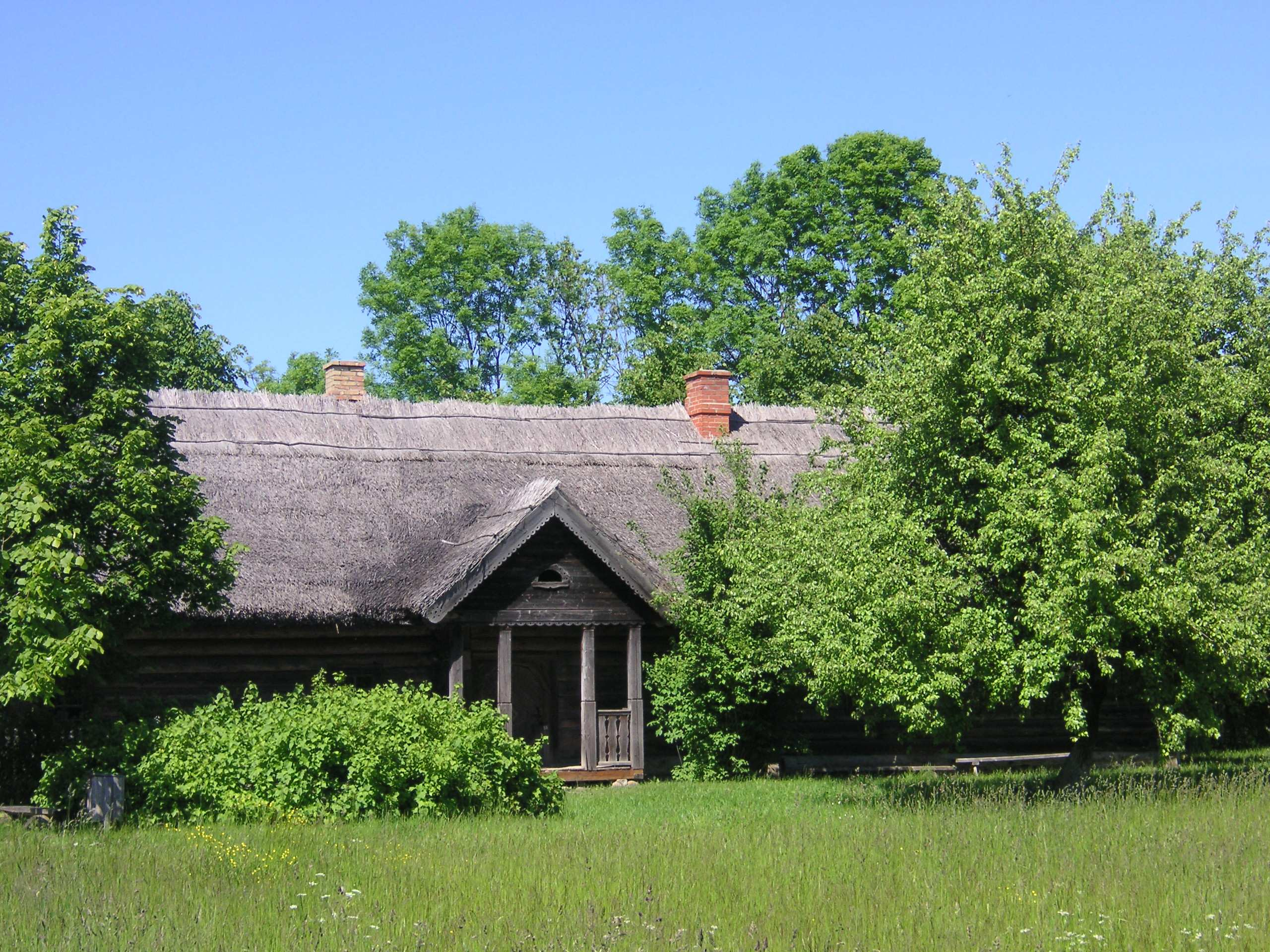
One of the wooden houses in the museum

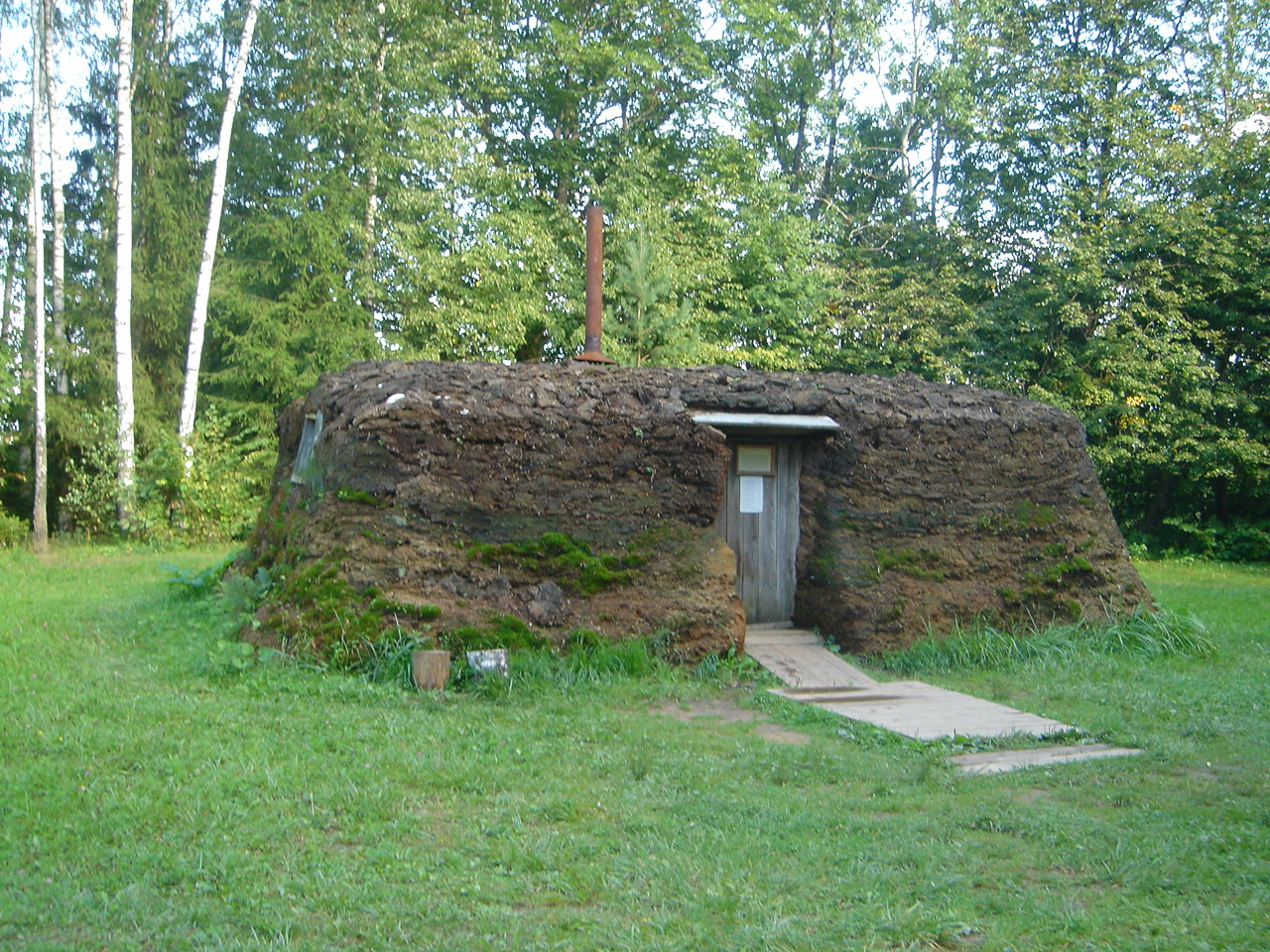
Recent addition to the exposition – a dwelling that was used by Lithuanian deportees to Siberia

== History ==
Rumšiškės was first mentioned in year 1382 as Rumsinker in the Lithuanian route report (Wegeberichte), prepared by the Teutonic Knights. At that time Rumšiškės were a center of land or an estate of a local ruler. In 1385 Teutonic knights by returning from siege of Vilnius were attacked by Lithuanians who prevented their crossing of the river Nemunas. In 1387 in the letter of Jogaila to Skirgaila, Rumšiškės was mentioned as village. At first the plan of Rumšiškės was linear, but in the first half of 15th century the plan of Rumšiškės was becoming a radial one.

In 1940–1941, a Soviet concentration camp was created in a nearby village of Pravieniškės. After 1941 the camp was used by the Nazis. All members of the Jewish community were murdered by the Nazis and local collaborationists near Rumšiškės during World War II. One of the most well-known Jews of this locale is Rabbi Haim, known best for the Jewish adaptation of allegory of the long spoons.

Kaunas Lagoon now lies in the place of the old Rumšiškės. The old town was flooded as a result of the construction of Kaunas hydroelectric power station, while the main objects – St. Michael the Archangel Church, its bell tower and the chapel that stands in the current Rumšiškės town cemetery – were moved.

== Open-air ethnographic museum ==
Today, Rumšiškės is best known for its excellent open-air ethnographic museum (established in 1966 and opened in 1974), one of the largest in Europe.

The open-air museum is a unique and one of the largest open-air ethnographic museums in Europe. It has the biggest quantity of exhibits (90820 exhibits). The open-air museum in Rumšiškės displays the heritage of Lithuanian rural life in a vast collection of authentic resurrected buildings where the Lithuanian people lived and worked. The total area of 175 ha (432 acre) contains 140 buildings from the 18th–19th century with the restored original interiors and surroundings. This museum was established to help to preserve and research the former ways of living.

The buildings of this museum are exposed as farmsteads and all of them together represent the main ethnographic regions of Lithuania: Aukštaitija, Samogitia, Dzūkija and Suvalkija. Each has the homes, barns, granaries, stables, mills characteristic to the area. They all have restored unique interiors with ancient Lithuanian used household furniture, utensils, and home decorations. Some buildings are equipped with workshops, presenting the ancient Lithuanian handicraft works, showing how the tools were made and antique farming implements were used.

The museum has a sector dedicated for exile and resistance. In this section there is a yurt covered with turf, an animal deportation wagon, a partisan bunker camouflaged at the stream slope and well-equipped.

The territory of the museum is a very popular place where ethnographic festivals are celebrated and folk song and dance concerts are held. This museum is very easy to reach since it is located 18 km (11 mi) to the east of Kaunas near the Kaunas-Vilnius highway. Rumšiškės belongs to the Kaunas Reservoir Regional Park.

The museum was featured in the reality show The Amazing Race 12 in 2007. The location was used for scenes in film Invincible (2001 theatrical film) by Werner Herzog.

== Užgavėnės ==
Užgavėnės (literal meaning - the time before Lent) - a festival to drive the winter out. It is the oldest festival of its kind known in all of Europe. Lithuanians celebrate the annual festival in Open-Air Museum in Rumšiškės. Festival takes place during the seventh week before Easter. Užgavėnės begins on the night before Ash Wednesday, when an effigy of winter, named More, is burnt. It celebrates the end of winter and the beginning of spring. Another popular festival tradition is a staged theatrical fight between Lašininis (porky) personifying winter and Kanapinis (hempen man) personifying spring. Kanapinis always wins. Devils, witches, goats, the grim reaper, gypsies, and other joyful and frightening characters appear in costume during the celebrations. The traditional dish of the holiday is pancakes with a variety of toppings. Round pancakes symbolize the returning sun.

== Notable people ==
- Rabbi Haim of Romshishok, to which is attributed the Jewish version of the allegory of the long spoons.
- The poet Antanas Baranauskas attended school in Rumšiškės.
- The artist Kęstutis Krasauskas has worked at the open air museum.
