= Ugnė Karvelis =

Ugnė Karvelis (13 June 1935 – 4 March 2002, in Paris, France) was a writer, a translator and a member of the UNESCO Executive Board from 1997 to 2002.

== Biography ==
Karvelis was born in Noreikiškės, Kaunas district on 13 June 1935, to Lithuanian politician Petras Karvelis (1925-1929 Foreign Minister of Lithuania) and Veronika Bakštytė, a cultural activist. Following the 1940 incorporation of Lithuanie into the Soviet Union, the Karvelis family emigrated to Germany in 1944.

In 1940, Karvelis enrolled in Sacre Coeur, a private school in Berlin. She continued her studies at Kaunas Aušra Gymnasium (1943-1944) and Tübingen French school (1945-1950). Karvelis studied at the Sorbonne (1951-1952) and then in the international relations department at Institut d’Etudes Politiques de Paris from 1952 to 1956. Karvelis furthered her studies overseas at Columbia University in New York in the history and economics departments from 1957 to 1958.

In 1955. Karvelis began working for Express magazine in the international relations department. From 1959 to 1983, she worked as a publisher and editor for Editions Gallimard, beginning as an international department manager, and later managing the Latin America, Spain, Portugal and Eastern Europe departments. Thanks to her, many renowned writers such as Julio Cortázar (her partner between 1967 and 1970), Pablo Neruda, and Octavio Paz were published in France. Karvelis also worked as a literary critic publishing in Le Figaro and Le Monde.

In 1988, Karvelis visited Lithuania and in 1991 helped Lithuania to join UNESCO. In 1993 she became Lithuania's permanent delegate to UNESCO.

In 1991, Karvelis directed two documentary movies about Lithuania.

She translated many Lithuanian authors into French, most notably novels by Saulius Tomas Kondrotas (Gaze of the Viper Lithuanian: Žalčio žvilgsnis)), Ričardas Gavelis, Bitė Vilimaitė, and Jurga Ivanauskaitė. She translated classic poems by Kristijonas Donelaitis, Maironis, Balys Sruoga, Salomėja Nėris, Vincas Mykolaitis-Putinas, and Jonas Aistis. Additionally she translated poems by modern authors: Marcelijus Martinaitis (Passerelle de nuages Lithuanian: Debesų lieptais), Eduardas Mieželaitis, Justinas Marcinkevičius, Sigitas Geda, Antanas A. Jonynas, Gintaras Patackas, and Almis Grybauskas among others.

== Works of note ==
- Demain, il n'y aura plus de trains, 1991, novel (Lithuanian: Traukinių daugiau nebus, 1997).
