= Allegory of the long spoons =

Parable about heaven and hell

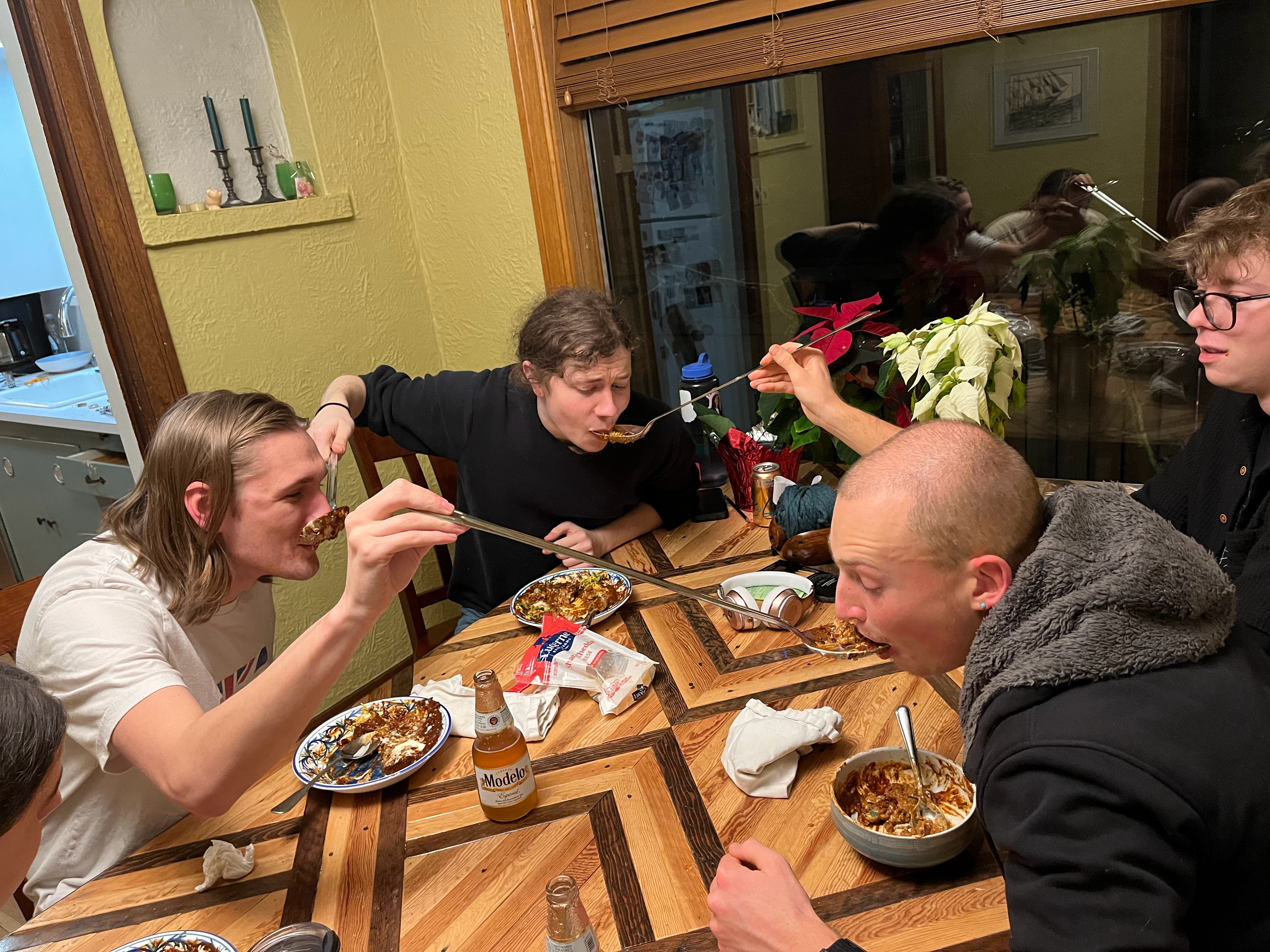
A modern reenactment of the allegory

The allegory of the long spoons is a parable that shows the difference between heaven and hell by means of people forced to eat with long spoons. It is attributed to Rabbi Haim of Romshishok, as well as other sources.

== Allegory ==
The allegory can be summarized as follows:

In each location, the inhabitants are given access to food, but the utensils are too unwieldy to serve oneself with. In hell, the people cannot cooperate, and consequently starve. In heaven, the diners feed one another across the table and are sated.

The story can encourage people to be kind to each other. There are various interpretations of the fable including its use in sermons and in advice to uncaring people.

== Interpretation ==
The story suggests that people can use what they are given (the long spoons in this allegory) to help nourish each other, but the problem, as Haim points out, lies in how people treat each other.

Given the same level playing field one group of people who treat each other well will create a pleasant environment, whereas another group of people, given exactly the same tools to work with, can create unpleasant conditions simply by how they treat each other. Writer Dawn Eden Goldstein suggests that this is a simple truth that can be easily forgotten by lonely people who cannot see their situation clearly. She argues that such conditions can be improved by reaching out to others.

== Variations ==
The long spoons allegory has become part of the folklore of several cultures, for example: Jewish, Hindu, Buddhist, "Oriental" (Middle-Eastern) and Christian. In medieval Europe, the food in the story is a bowl of stew; in China, it is a bowl of rice being eaten with long chopsticks.

In some versions of the story, the diners are using regular cutlery but are unable to bend their arms, with a story attributed to Rabbi Haim of Romshishok describing how "both arms were splinted with wooden slats so he could not bend either elbow to bring the food to his mouth".

== Art and popular culture ==
While the parable itself is seldom depicted in art, it is well known and used in sermons when referring to hell, where the fashion for depicting hell in terrible, painful, gruesome terms is fading in recent times.

A scene in the 2013 thriller The East draws strong comparisons to the allegory when protagonist Sarah is depicted as selfish for neglecting to feed her adjacent diner while in a straitjacket. The plot of 2019's The Platform has also been compared to the allegory.

Caritas made a short animated video based on this allegory for their campaign "One human family, food for all".

== See also ==
- Afterlife
- The Golden Rule
- Jewish folklore
- Stone soup
- Towards a Global Ethic: An Initial Declaration
- World peace
