= Jonas Aistis =

Lithuanian writer, poet, and essayist

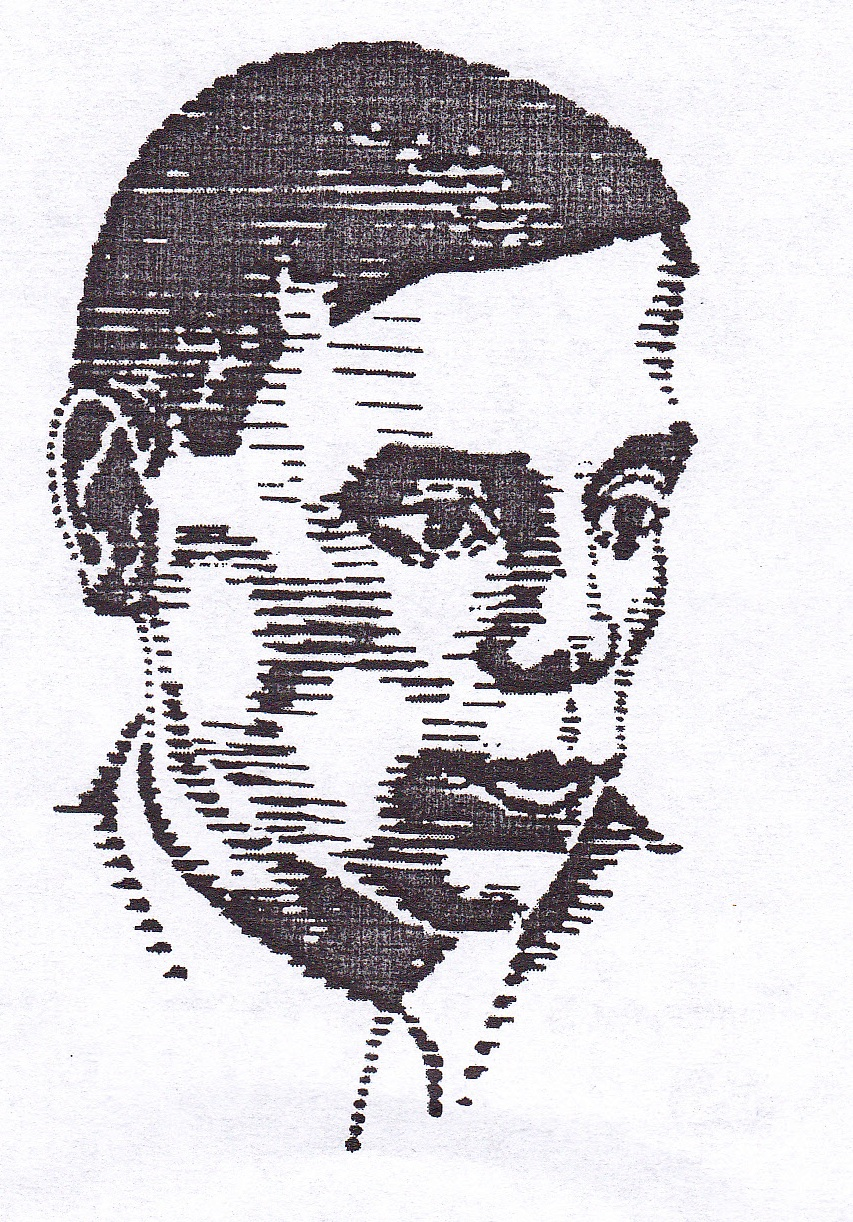
- Jonas Aleksandravičius-Aistis
- Born: 7 July 1904; Kampiškės, Russian Empire
- Died: 13 June 1973 (aged 68); Washington D.C., United States
- Resting place: Rumšiškės cemetery
- Education: Vytautas Magnus University
- Occupations: Writer, poet, literary critic, translator
- Writing career
- Genres: Literary realism, catharsis, neoromanticism

Jonas Aleksandravičius (7 July 1904 – 13 June 1973), better known as Jonas Aistis or Jonas Kuosa-Aleksandravičius, was a Lithuanian writer, poet, and essayist. Aistis was one of the most prominent neoromantic poets of Lithuania.

== Biography ==
=== Early life ===
Jonas Aleksandravičius was born on 7 July 1904 in the village of Kampiškės of the modern-day Kaunas district, then part of the Russian Empire. His father, a blacksmith, would jokingly give his son the nickname "Kuosa". Aistis would later take this name and apply it to himself. His family moved to Rumšiškės in 1907, at which Aistis attended primary school from 1913 until 1919 and later, the Kaunas Aušra Gymnasium, at which Aistis often felt lonely and vulnerable, and as a result, confided in books and classical literature. He translated works by Shakespeare and Byron from Russian and Polish, as well as attempted to create poems himself. Aists was described as a competent child, but he struggled with school and was once left to stay for a second year.

=== Literary career ===
In 1927 Aistis began his Lithuanian studies at the Vytautas Magnus University in Kaunas, meanwhile working as a clerk for the Agriculture Bank (Žemės bankas). Aistis printed his first poem in 1926 in the Ateitis magazine, establishing himself as an essayist and literary critic of dynamic style. The poems were held in high regard by Kazys Binkis. In 1932 Aistis graduated, and in the same year released his debut collection of poems. Four years later in 1936 he received an education ministry-sponsored trip to France, specifically the Grenoble Alpes University to study the French language and French literature. Aistis would not return to Lithuania since.

=== Immigration and work abroad ===
In France, Aistis received a government-sponsored scholarship to pursue his studies. Until 1940 Aistis signed his work as Kossu-Aleksandravičius, Aleksandriškis and Kuosa-Aleksandriškis. In 1944 he published his thesis entitled Linguistic etude about the Evangelical translation of texts to the old Provense language. Aistis worked in an archive in Nice, as well as in the Paris National Library (Bibliothèque nationale de France) until 1946. In 1946 Aistis moved to the United States, working at the Marianapolis college where he lectured the Lithuanian, French and Spanish languages. From 1952 onward, Aistis would become his official surname. That same year Aistis moved to New York and began working with the National Committee for a Free Europe, collecting analytical reviews of Lithuanian newspapers and books. From 1958 Aistis worked in the Library of Congress.

Aistis died on 13 June 1973 in Washington D.C..

== Works ==
=== Themes ===
Aistis was a representative of the Lithuanian neoromantic movement. Especially in his later work, Aistis focus mainly on Lithuanian identity. Aistis wrote about themes such as the opposition of the ideal and reality, modern expressions of traditional rural worldliness, and the stylistics of emotional confession. Aistis revealed the traditional sentiment of romanticism, that the poet is an exponent of the nation's worldview, with subtle inner experiences. The foreboding of the coming historical catastrophe of Europe and the occupation of Lithuania is conveyed by romantic images of the Middle Ages and motifs of Lithuanian history. Aistis relied on the romantic interpretation of catharsis – that creativity is born from suffering, and sadness is inextricably linked to beauty.

== Remembrance ==
In 1994 a bust of Aistis was built in his hometown. In 1997 an official museum of his name was opened. In 2000, Aistis was reburied in his hometown. In 2004, the Jonas Aistis Literature Prize was re-established.
