= Museum of the White War in Adamello =

- Museo della Guerra Bianca in Adamello
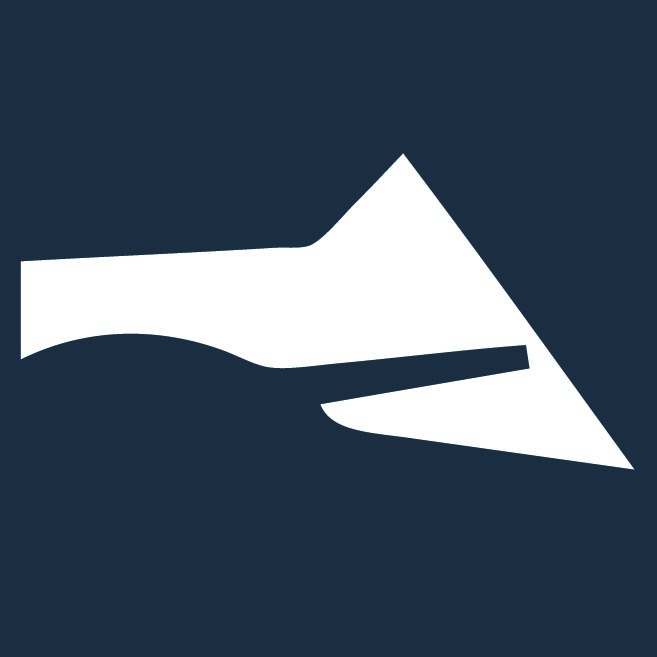

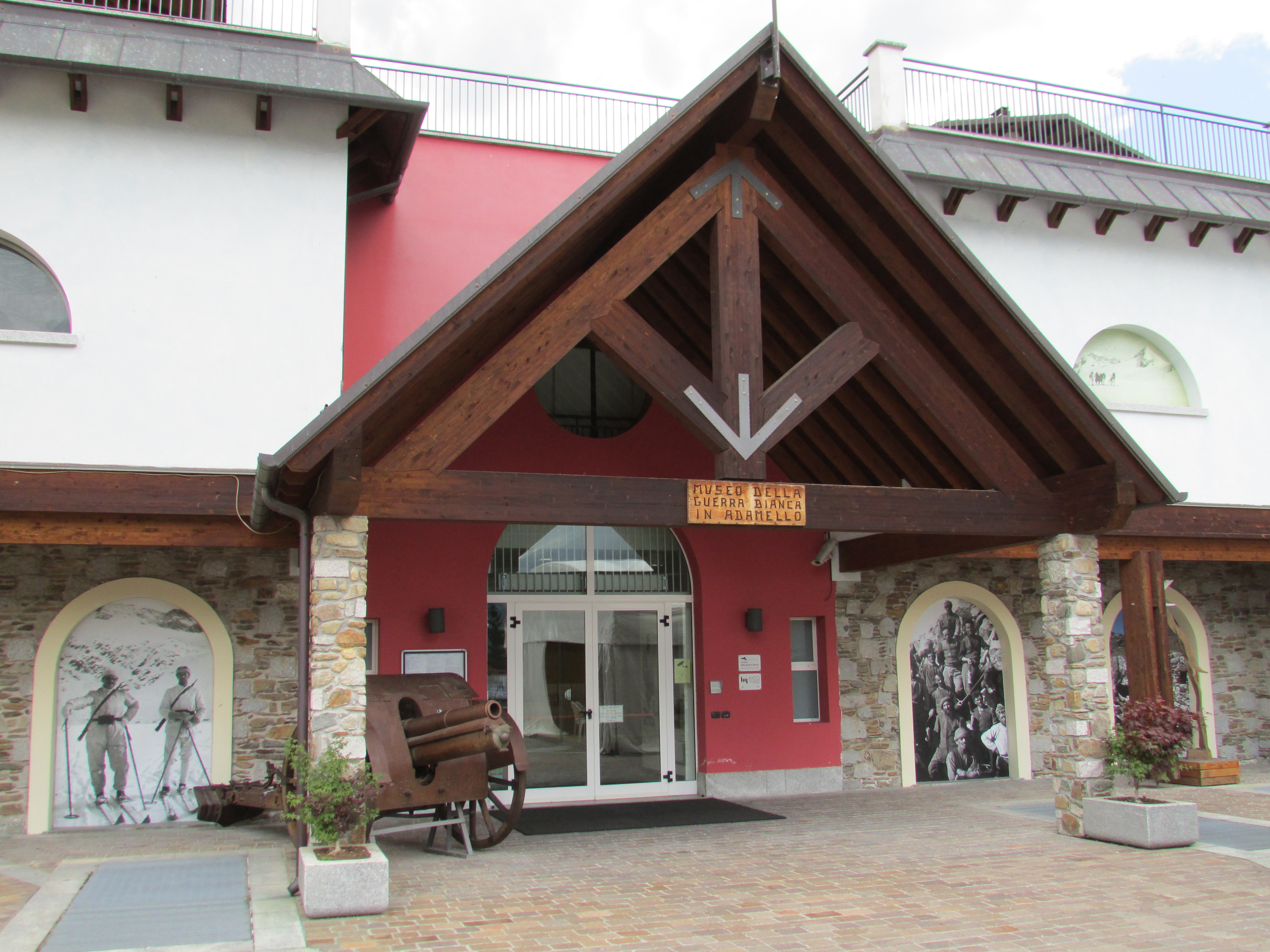
- Established: 1974
- Location: Temù, Italy
- Coordinates: 46.248684°N 10.468327°E
- Type: Museum of War Material; Study and Research Center
- Founder: Sperandio Zani
- Director: Walter Belotti
- Website: www.museoguerrabianca.it

The Museum of the White War in Adamello is an Italian museum located in Temù, in the Upper Val Camonica, in the province of Brescia. It is devoted to the conservation and valorization of military-historic heritage coming from the First World War and especially from the so-called White War in Adamello-Presanella which was the Italian front between Stelvio Pass and Garda Lake during that war.
