= Temù =

Temù Temö (Lombard)
- Comune
- Comune di Temù
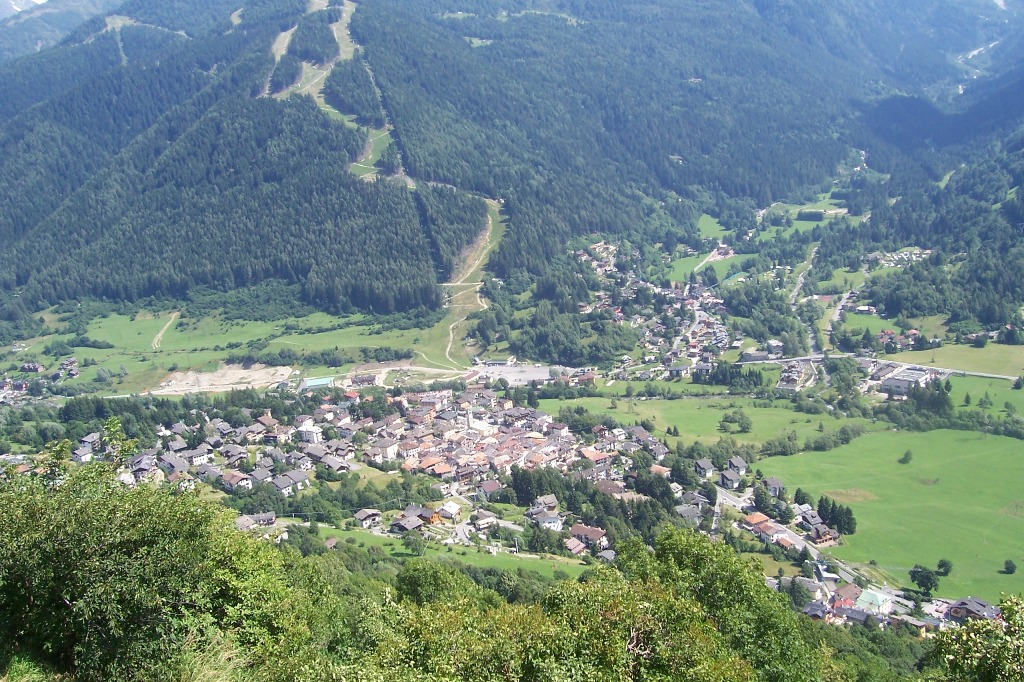
- Temù

- Location within Italy Location within Lombardy
- Coordinates: 46°14′58″N 10°28′8″E
- Country: Italy
- Region: Lombardy
- Province: Brescia (BS)
- Frazioni: Pontagna, Villa Dalegno, Lecanù

Area
  - Total: 43.04 km^{2} (16.62 sq mi)
- Elevation: 1,150 m (3,770 ft)

Population (2016)
  - Total: 1,113
  - Density: 25.86/km^{2} (66.98/sq mi)
- Time zone: UTC+1 (CET)
  - Summer (DST): UTC+2 (CEST)
- Postal code: 25050
- Dialing code: 0364
- Patron saint: San Bartolomeo
- Saint day: 24 agosto
- Website: Official website

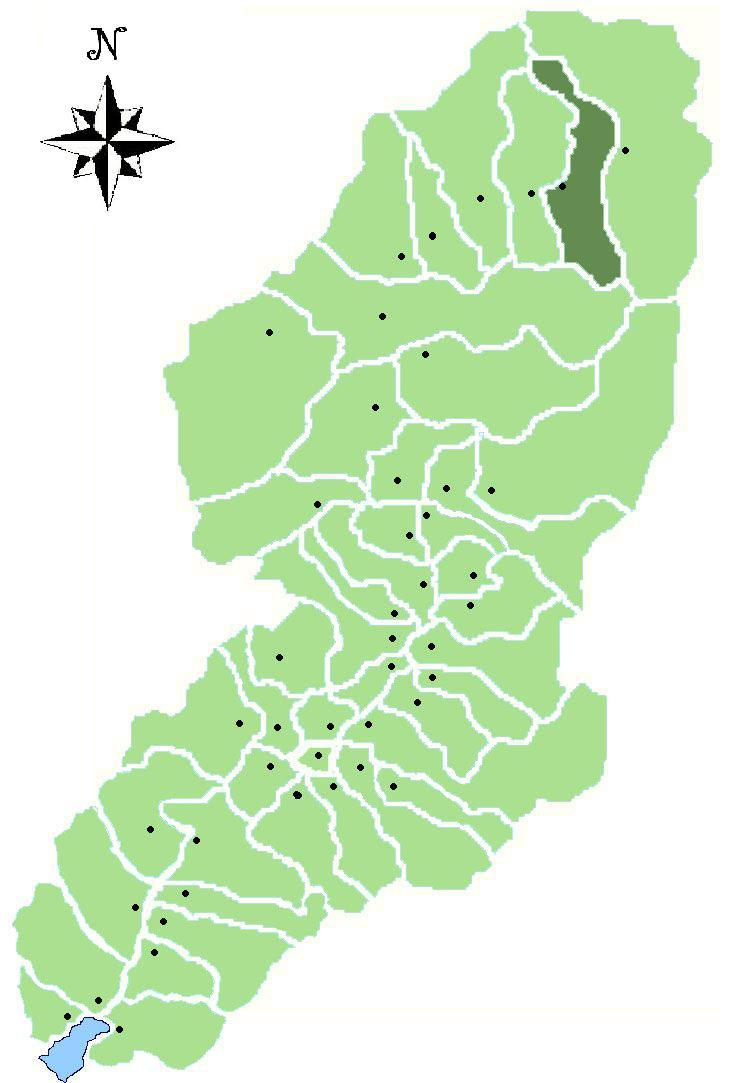
Location of Temù in Val Camonica

Temù (Camunian: Temö) is an Italian comune of 1,113 inhabitants (As of 2016) in the province of Brescia, in Lombardy, Italy.

== Geography ==
It is situated on the river Oglio, in the upper Val Camonica. It is composed of two districts: Pontagna (1.164 m.) and Villa Dalegno (1.380 m.).

== Monuments and Attractions ==
=== Religious Architecture ===
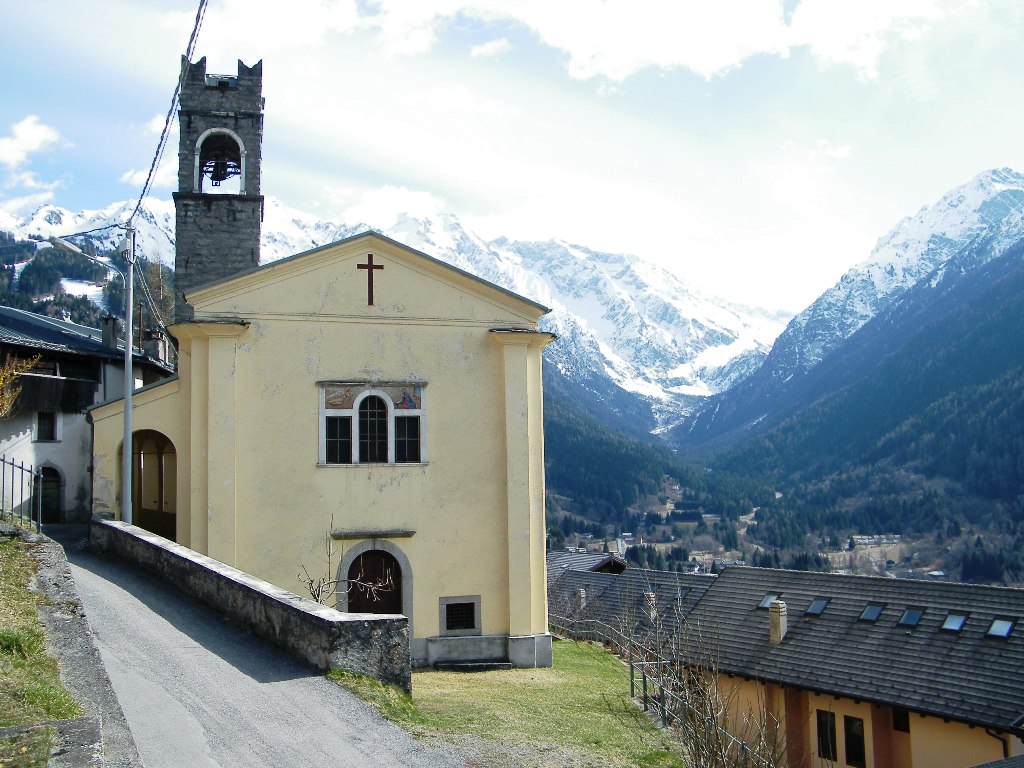
Church of the Holy Martyrs of Lecanù

Temù has three main churches:

- San Bartolomeo Apostolo: it was renovated in the 19th century and its structure dates back to the 16th century. The gate is made of marble from Vezza d'Oglio.
- Sant'Alessandro: it is located in the street which goes to Vione. The structure dates back to the 16th century, but the bell tower dates back to the 13th century.
- Santi Martiri: it is situated in Lecanù and dates back to the 16th century.

== Culture ==
=== Museums ===
Temù hosts the Museo della Guerra Bianca in Adamello (Museum of the White War in Adamello).

== Economy ==
=== Tourism ===
Nowadays, despite the presence of beautiful natural resources which could attract tourists, the economy of Temù is based on the residential construction (secondary houses and residence) in relation to the activity of the ski area of Adamello Ski.

In summer tourism is underestimated compared to its richness in natural resources and local traditions, whereas the exploitation of the territory is excessive is winter due to winter sports, for example skiing. This is the main reason why the jobs are mostly seasonal.

== Administration ==
=== Mayors ===
Period from	Period to	Mayor	Party	Position
23 April 1995	14 June 1999	Maria Giovanna Battistel	Partito Popolare Italiano	Mayor
14 June 1999	8 June 2009	Corrado Tomasi	Lista Civica di Centrosinistra	Mayor
8 June 2009	in office	Menici Roberto	Lista Civica di Centrosinistra	Mayor

=== Municipalities Union ===
Temù is part of the Unione dei Comuni dell'Alta Valle Camonica ("Municipalities Union of High Val Camonica") together with Ponte di Legno, Vione, Vezza d'Oglio, Incudine and Monno. The Unione is based in Ponte di Legno and it was established in 2000. Its surface is 284,10 km^{2}.

=== Union with Ponte di Legno ===
On 28 October 2012 the municipality asked residents in a referendum about the union with Ponte di Legno, but the proposal has not been approved and the same happened in 2017.
