= Rock Drawings in Valcamonica =

Prehistoric petroglyph collection in Italy

UNESCO World Heritage Site
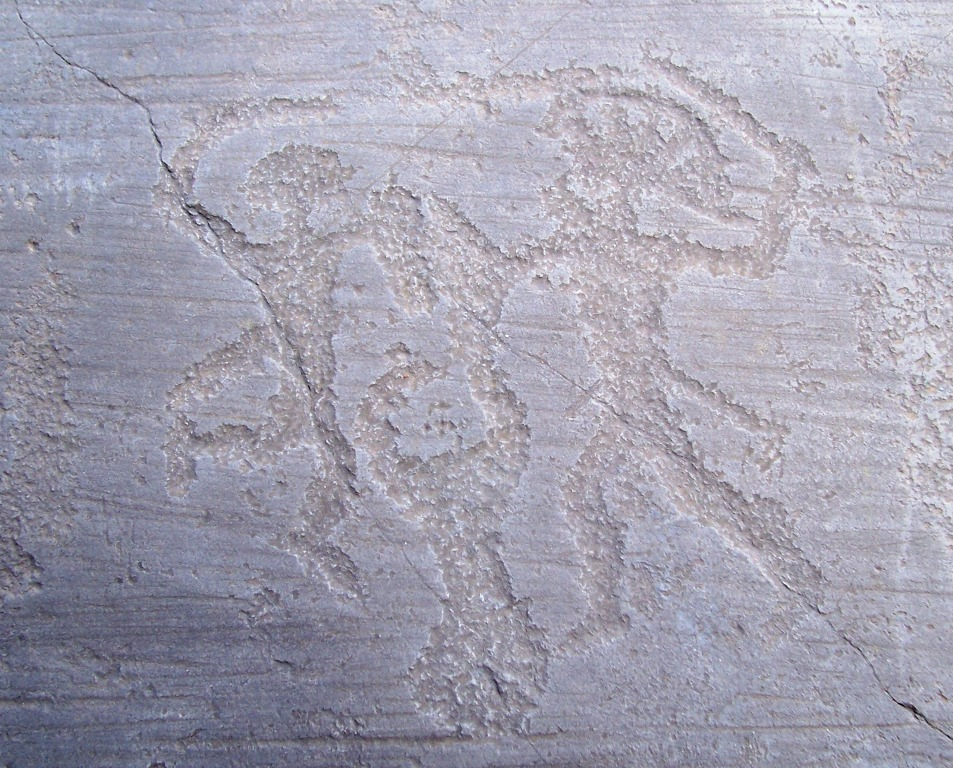
- Petroglyphs in Nadro

- Location within Lombardy Location within Italy
- Location: Val Camonica, Province of Brescia, Lombardy, Italy
- Criteria: Cultural: (iii), (vi)
- Reference: 94
- Inscription: 1979 (3rd Session)
- Area: 432.3 ha (1,068 acres)
- Buffer zone: 1,018.23 ha (2,516.1 acres)
- Coordinates: 45°57′25.4″N 10°17′50.4″E

The rock drawings in Valcamonica (Camonica Valley) are located in the Province of Brescia, Italy, and constitute the largest collections of prehistoric petroglyphs in the world. The collection was recognized by UNESCO in 1979 and was Italy's first recognized World Heritage Site. UNESCO has formally recognized more than 140,000 figures and symbols, but new discoveries have increased the number of catalogued incisions to between 200,000 and 300,000. The petroglyphs are spread on all surfaces of the valley, but concentrated in the areas of Darfo Boario Terme, Capo di Ponte, Nadro, Cimbergo and Paspardo.

== Characteristics ==
The vast majority of the petroglyphs are made on subglacially streamlined bedrock and glacial erratic surfaces revealed as the last glacier to form the valley retreated approximately 15,000 years ago.

Many of the incisions were made over a time period of eight thousand years preceding the Iron Age (1st millennium BC), while petroglyphs of the last period are attributed to the people of Camuni, mentioned by Latin sources. The petroglyph tradition does not end abruptly. Engravings have been identified (although in very small number; not comparable with the great prehistoric activity) from the Roman period, medieval period and are possibly even contemporary, up to the 19th century. Most of the cuts have been made using the "martellina" technique ("martellina" being a hammer-like tool, used to create small circular holes in the rock) and lesser numbers obtained through graffiti.

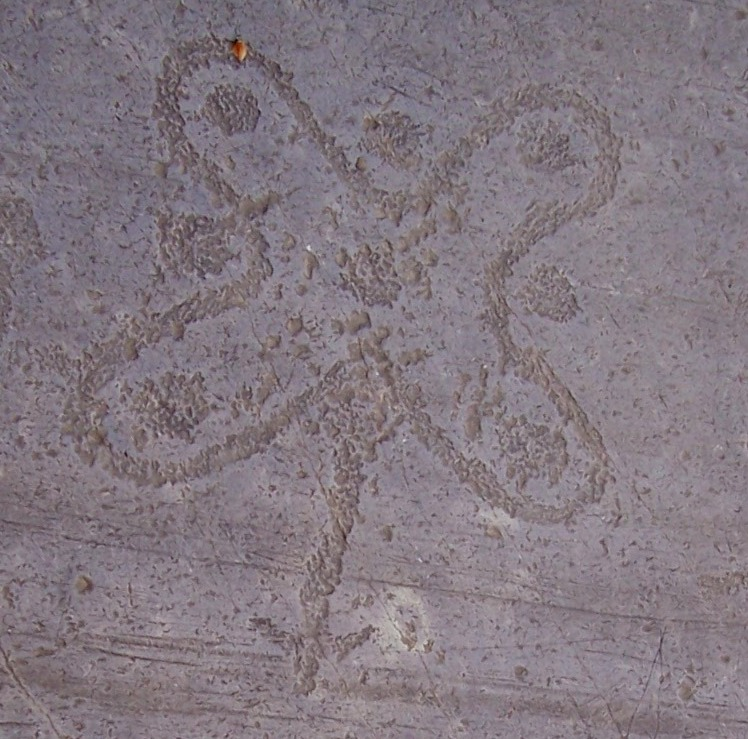
The Camunian rose

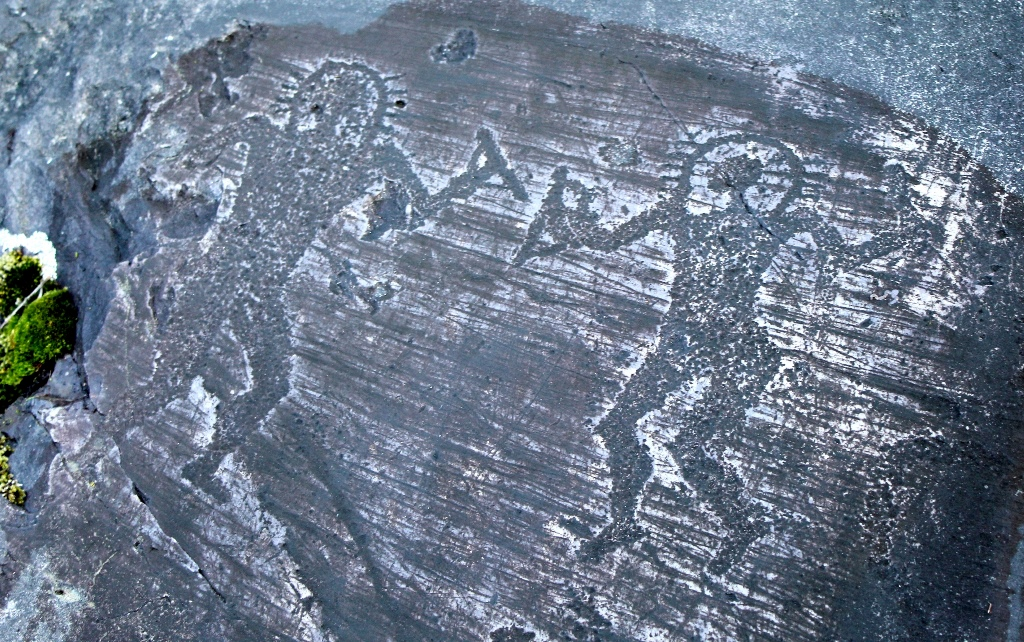
"The astronauts", c. 1.000 BC

The figures are sometimes simply superimposed without apparent order. Others instead appear to have a logical relationship between them; for example, a picture of a religious rite or a hunting scene or fight. This approach explains the scheme of images, each of which is an ideogram that is not the real object, but its "idea". Their function pertains to celebratory rituals: commemorative, initiatory and propitiatory; first in the field of religion, then later even secular, which were held on special occasions, either single or recurrent. Among the most-famous symbols found in Valcamonica is the so-called "Rosa camuna" (Camunian rose), which was adopted as the official symbol of the region of Lombardy.

== The historiated cycle: themes and periodization ==
In the 1960s, the archaeologist Emmanuel Anati, among the first to systematically study the area, drew up a chronology of rock carvings. It compared the style and types of the symbols to identify possible correlations with the traditional historical periodization, from Prehistory to the Middle Ages.

According to Anati's research results, Val Camonica is divided into Proto-Camunian, Camunian I, II, III, IV and Post-Camunian (Roman, Medieval ages and recent) periods.

Proto-Camunian period	Final Paleolithic, Epipaleolithic and Proto-Neolithic
The Camunian I	Neolithic
The Camunian II	Neolithic
The Camunian III	Chalcolithic, Early and Middle Bronze Age
The Camunian IV	The late and final Bronze Age, Iron Age

=== Epipaleolithic ===
The earliest rock carvings date back to epipaleolithic (or Mesolithic, Proto-Camunian, 8th-6th millennium BC), several millennia after the retreat of the glacier that covered the Val Camonica (Würm glaciation). Those carvings were the work of passing nomadic hunters, following the migrations of their prey. The figures represented in fact depict large animals such as deer and elk, which are the typical prey of that period. The drawings also describe animals wounded with spears. This kind of rock art can be typical for hunters-gatherers and associated with blades and microlites industry. Similar representations are present in the stone carvings of Luine Municipal Park (comune of Darfo Boario Terme).

=== Neolithic ===
During the Neolithic period (the 5th to 1st centuries of the 4th millennium BC approximately-5500-3300 BC), agricultural practices spread in Val Camonica, correlated with the formation of the first sedentary settlements. In the field of rock art, human figures and sets of geometric elements, such as rectangles, circles, and dots, constitute the main elements of the compositions and complete the symbolic meaning of the anthropomorphical petroglyphs. Similar carvings are present in the Regional Reserve of Rock Engravings of Ceto, Cimbergo, and Paspardo. The pertaining to the Neolithic of the schematic anthropomorphic figures, so called "oranti" ("praying figures"), is questioned, as some scholars refer them to the Bronze Age. According to this interpretation, the only set of figures pertaining to the Neolithic, or to a Neolithic-first Copper Age phase (4th mill. BC), is constituted by the geometric patterns, which are interpreted as topographic representation of a cultivated and ploughed land.

During this period, domesticated animals are encountered such as dogs, goats and bulls.

Until the end of the Camunian II period, objects of worshipping became wider. Particularly, the dog, the first-domesticated animal started to be worshipped.

=== Copper Age ===
During the Copper Age (or Chalcolithic period, the 3rd millennium BC approximately-3300-2500 BC), new symbols appeared, documenting the emergence of the wheel, the wagon and the first forms of metallurgy. Alpine rock art began to develop in this period. Rocks were stained with celestial symbols, animals, weapons, depictions of plowing, chains of human-beings and other signs. Although the anthropomorphic figures were primitive at first, later these images were even more intense and more complicated by adding weapons, astral disks and rectangular that symbolize the world in addition to simple figures. These monuments, preserved mainly in the Archaeological Park of National Massi Cemmo and in that of Asinino-Anvòia (Ossimo), indicate a ritual function linked to the veneration of ancestors.

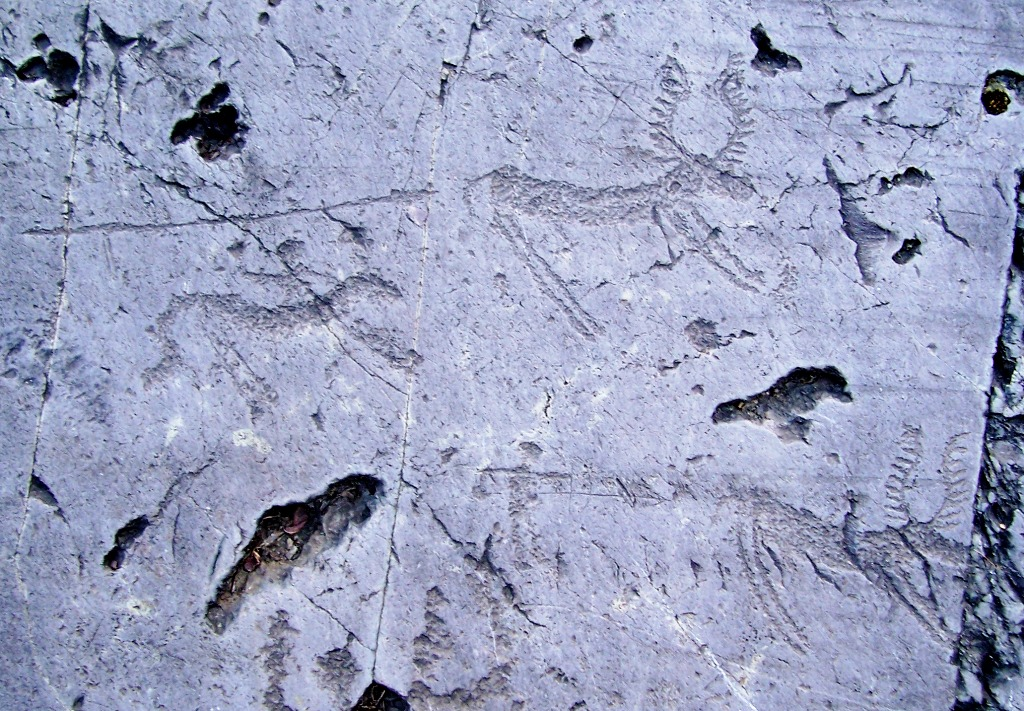
Deer-hunting scene

=== Bronze Age ===
During the Bronze Age (2nd millennium BC, approximately), engravings on rock outcrops took on the issue of weapons, reflecting the greater emphasis given them by the warriors in the Camunian society of the time. Continuing emphasis was given to geometric shapes (circles and variants), in continuity with engravings from earlier eras.

=== Iron Age ===
The engravings of the Iron Age (1st millennium BC) are attributed to the people of Camunni and constitute about 70-80% of all census figures. These works manifest their ideals of heroic masculinity and superiority. Dominant themes include representations of duels and human figures, even large ones, flaunting their weapons, their muscles and their genitals. There are also figures of cabins, labyrinths, footprints, hunting scenes and other symbols. Topographic patterns are also present, mainly in the central part of the Iron Age (6th-4th century BC), like in the famous Bedolina Map, firstly studied by Miguel Beltrán Llorís and more recently by Cristina Turconi for the Milan University, one of the best known engraved surfaces of the Camonica Valley.

=== Roman Age ===
During the Roman domination of Val Camonica (~100 BC - ~500 AD) petroglyph activity suffered a sharp contraction, entering a phase of latency.

=== Medieval Age ===
The Middle Ages in Val Camonica marked a resumption of the rock engravery, starting from the first phase of the Medieval Ages. Many of the inscriptions during this period are Christian symbols, such as crosses and keys, that were joined and overlapped with those considered pagan symbols, in the background, in an attempt to sacralize these places.

== Discovery and evaluation ==
The first documented report of the engraved stones dates back to 1909, when Walther Laeng pointed out to the National Committee for the Protection of Monuments two boulders decorated around Cemmo (Capo di Ponte). Only in the 1920s, however, did the rocks pique the interest of scholars, including Giuseppe Bonafini, geologist Senofonte Squinabol, and, since 1929, Torinese anthropologist Giovanni Marro and Florentine archaeologist Paolo Graziosi. Soon numerous engravings were also discovered on the surrounding rocks, and research was conducted not only by Marro, but also by Raffaele Battaglia for the Superintendent to the Antiquities of Padua.

In the 1930s, the reputation of the cuts was more commonly known in Italy and abroad, so that between 1935 and 1937 an extensive campaign of studies was conducted by Germans Franz Altheim and Erika Trautmann. Altheim started reading Nazi ideologies into the engravings, which were soon imitated in a fascist work by Marro, identifying them as evidence of a supposed ancestral Aryan race.

The mapping and cataloging resumed after the Second World War, led by Laeng and conducted by scholars of the infant Museum of Natural Sciences of Brescia, consisting of both national and international experts. In 1955, with the institution of the Parco nazionale delle incisioni rupestri di Naquane by the Archaeological Superintendent of Lombardy, work began to preserve the rocks and their inscriptions. The explorations of Emmanuel Anati began in 1956 and discovered new petroglyphs. The systematic nature of these studies enabled him to publish, in 1960, the first volume of general summary about "La civilization du Val Camonica". In 1964, Anati founded the Centro Camuno di Studi Preistorici (Camunian Center of Prehistoric Studies). The first "Valcamonica Symposium", was held in 1968; first in a long series of conferences, convening in Valcamonica many scholars of art and prehistoric life.

After its inclusion by UNESCO as World Heritage Site number 94, continuing research has further broadened the heritage rocks recorded.

== Parks of rock art ==
N°	Name	Municipality	Coordinates	Petroglyphs
1.	Parco nazionale delle incisioni rupestri di Naquane	Capo di Ponte	46°01′32″N 10°20′57″E	
2.	Parco archeologico nazionale dei Massi di Cemmo	Capo di Ponte	46°01′52″N 10°20′20″E	
3.	Parco archeologico comunale di Seradina-Bedolina	Capo di Ponte	46°02′00″N 10°20′29″E	
4.	Parco archeologico di Asinino-Anvòia	Ossimo	45°57′19″N 10°14′47″E	
5.	Parco comunale delle incisioni rupestri di Luine	Darfo Boario Terme	45°53′20″N 10°10′46″E	
6.	Parco comunale archeologico e minerario di Sellero	Sellero	46°03′26″N 10°20′29″E	
7.	Parco archeologico comunale di Sonico	Sonico	46°10′7″N 10°21′20″E	
8.	Riserva naturale Incisioni rupestri di Ceto, Cimbergo e Paspardo	Ceto (Nadro); Cimbergo; Paspardo	46°01′6″N 10°21′10″E	

== See also ==
- Ancient astronauts
- Bedolina Map
- Camunni
- Camunic language
- Halo
- Rock art Natural reserve of Ceto, Cimbergo and Paspardo
- Val Camonica

== Bibliography ==
- Emanuele Süss, Rock Carvings in the Valcamonica, 1954.
- Emmanuel Anati, Camonica Valley: A Depiction of Village in the Alps From Neolithic Times to the Birth of Christ as Revealed by Thousands of Newly found Rock Carvings, 1961.
- Emmanuel Anati, Evolution and style in Camunian rock art: An inquiry into the formation of European civilization, 1976.
- Emmanuel Anati (1982). I Camuni: alle radici della civiltà europea. Milan: Jaca Book.
- Emmanuel Anati, Valcamonica rock art: A new history for Europe, 1994.
- The intellectual expressions of prehistoric man, art, and religion, Acts of the Valcamonica Symposium, 1979.
- Andrea Arcà, La Grande Roccia delle Aquane: Valcamonica archeo-rupestre, 2025.
- Oriana Bozzarelli, The Great Rock of the Aquane: A masterpiece of Valcamonica recounted (and made consultable) with 21st-century tool, 2026.
