= Bedolina Map =

Iron age map engraved into rock

Coordinates: 46°2′6.59″N 10°20′29.72″E

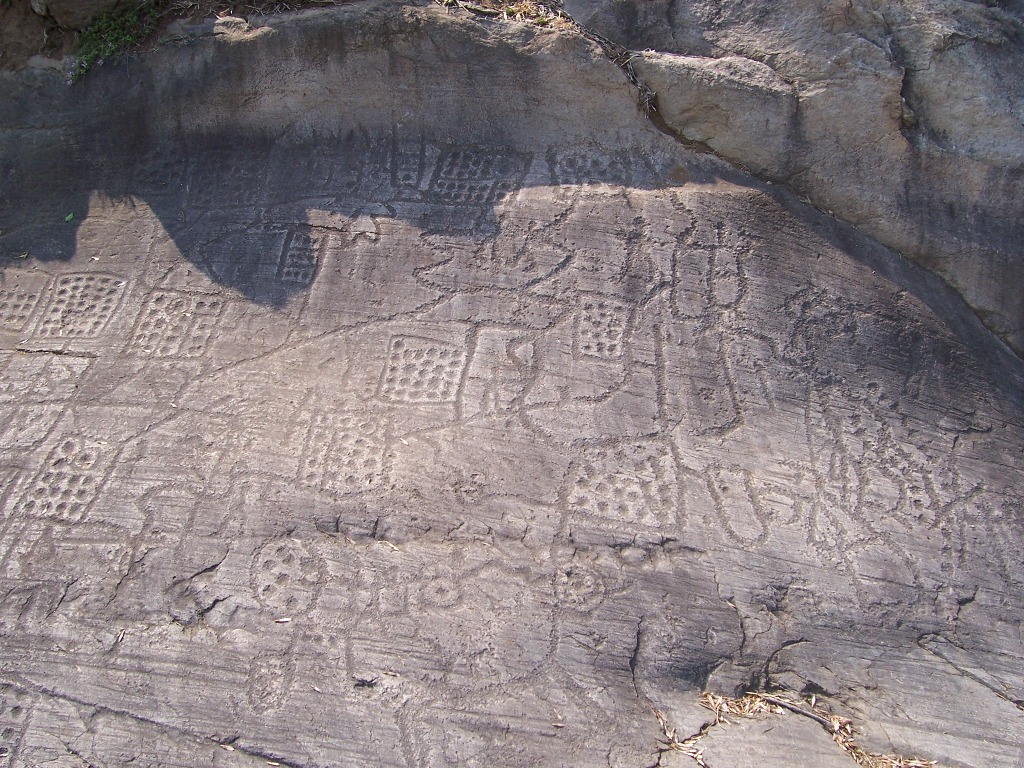
The Bedolina Map rock

The Bedolina Map (formally Rock 1 of Bedolina) is a famous engraved prehistoric rock which is part of the Camonica Valley (Alps, Italian side, Lombardy region) petroglyph complex. It is known as one of the most ancient topographic maps, interpreted as a depiction of cultivated plots, mountain paths and villages. The locality of Bedolina pertains to the Capo di Ponte municipality (BS-I), near the hamlet of Pescarzo. The area is included in the Seradina-Bedolina Archaeologic park, lying on a prominent terrace on the right slope of the Camonica valley, at an altitude of 530 m above the sea level. The rock, a flat surface of Permian sandstone (Verrucano of Lombardy) polished by the Pleistocene glacier, is 9 m long and 4 m wide.

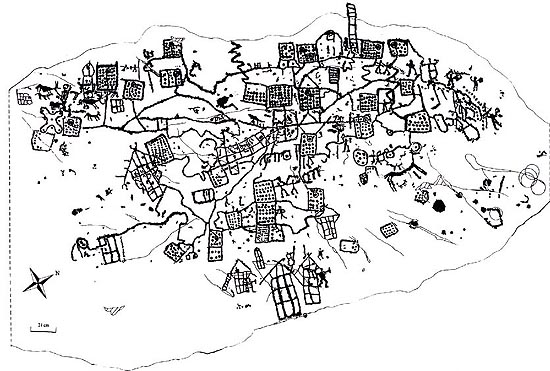
The general archaeo-iconographic tracing of the Bedolina Map (1996)

A total number of 109 figures were carved during the late Bronze Age and the Iron Age (1000-200 BC), mainly the so-called topographic patterns (dotted squares and zigzagging "paths"), warriors, animals, wooden huts, cup-marks and a Camunnian Rose. The rock has been completely recorded and studied by Miguel Beltrán Llorís (Beltrán Llorís 1972) and more recently by Cristina Turconi, for the Milan University. According to the most recent studies and to the close examination of figures and superimpositions, the best known engraved patterns of the Bedolina Map, precisely "maps", likely pertain to the Iron Age, and more in detail to the central centuries of the 1st millennium BC (6th-4th centuries BC).

== See also ==
Rock Drawings in Valcamonica
