= Rock art Natural reserve of Ceto, Cimbergo and Paspardo =

Coordinates: 46°01′6″N 10°21′10″E

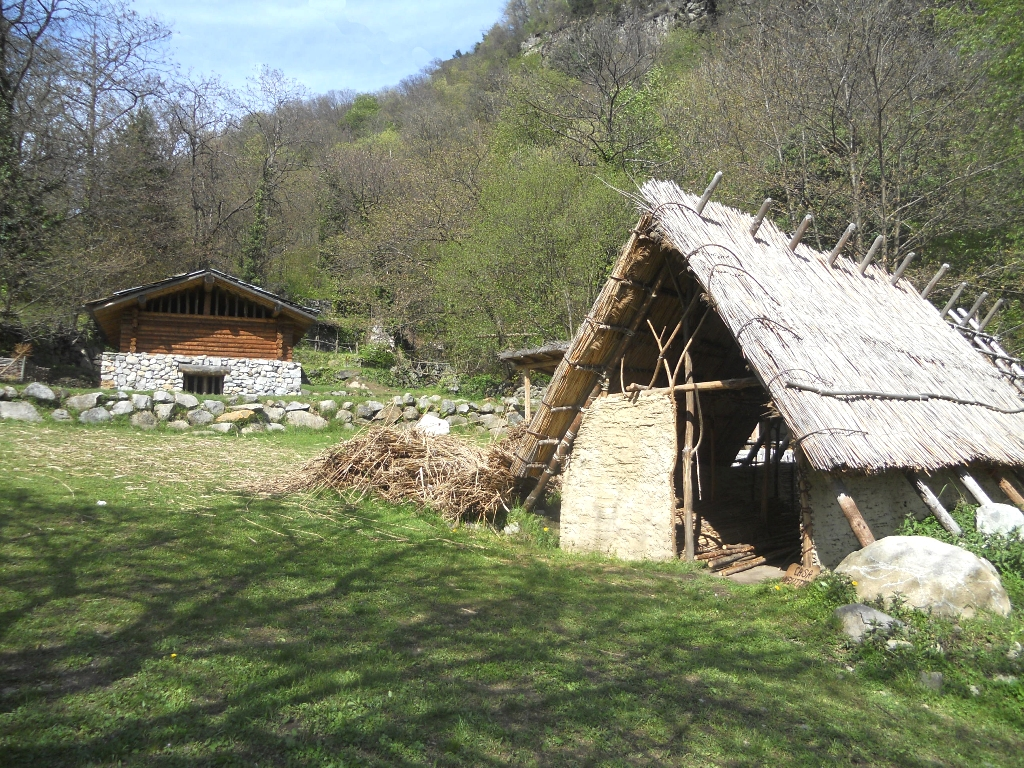
- Reconstruction of Prehistoric Village
- Interactive map of Rock art Natural reserve of Ceto, Cimbergo and Paspardo
- Location: Valle Camonica, Lombardy, Italy
- Area: 290 ha (720 acres)
- Established: 1988
- Governing body: Ente di Diritto Pubblico Riserva naturale Incisioni rupestri di Ceto, Cimbergo e Paspardo

The Rock art Natural Reserve of Ceto, Cimbergo and Paspardo is a nature reserve located in Valle Camonica, Province of Brescia, Lombardy, Italy. It was established in 1988.

The Reserve is a large protected area, mostly wooded, which extends for about 290 ha. Inside the Reserve there are at least 420 rock surfaces with rock engraves declared in 1979 World Heritage by UNESCO.

There are various itineraries and paths, but the main ones are:

- Ceto: Area of Foppe
- Cimbergo Area of Campanine
- Paspardo Areas of Plas, In Vall, Sottolaiolo

== Gallery ==
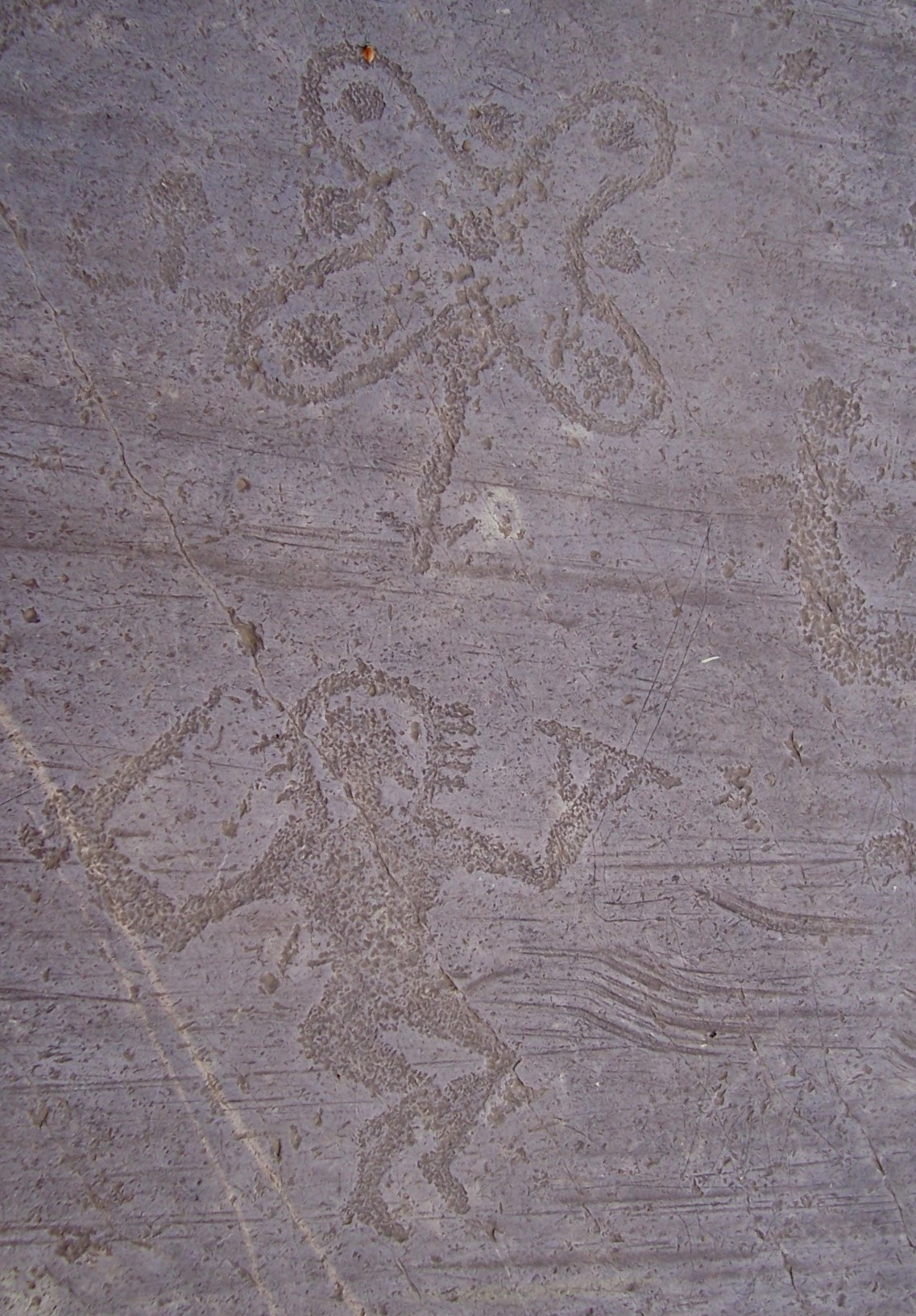
Camunian rose and "astronaut".
Area of Foppe, R. 24

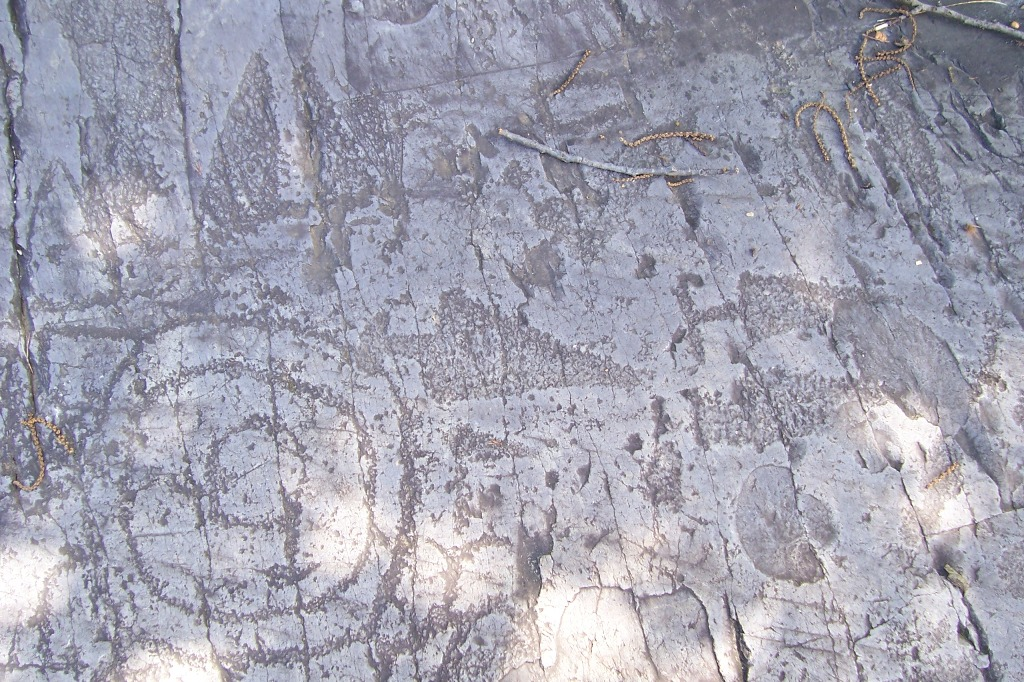
Engrave of dagger in "Remedello style".
Area of Foppe, R. 4

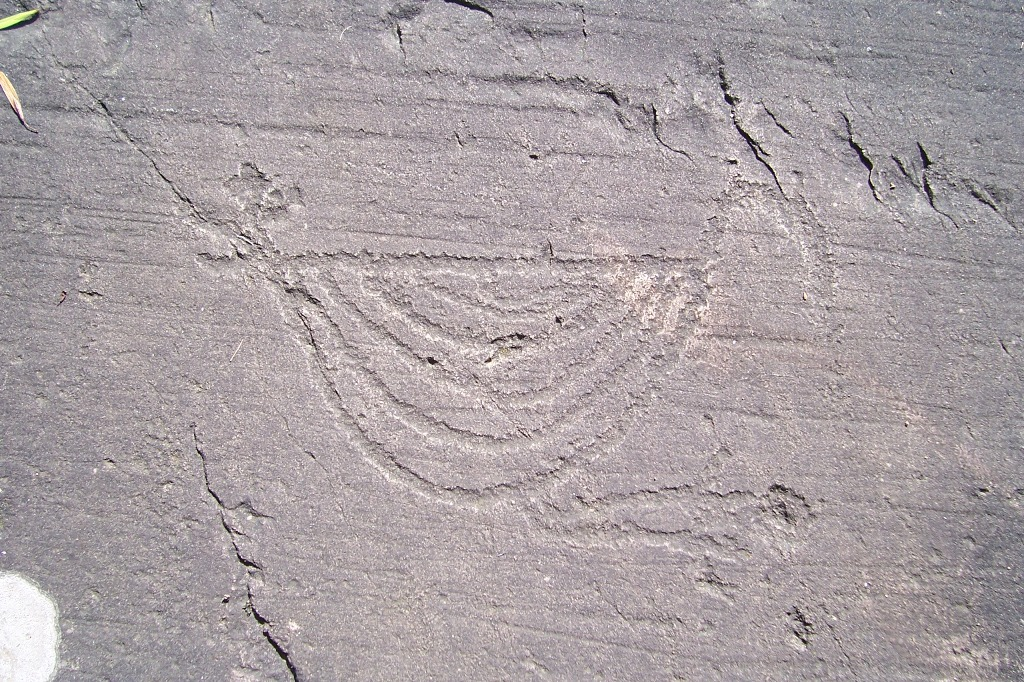
Figure of rapacious bird.
Area of Foppe, R. 5

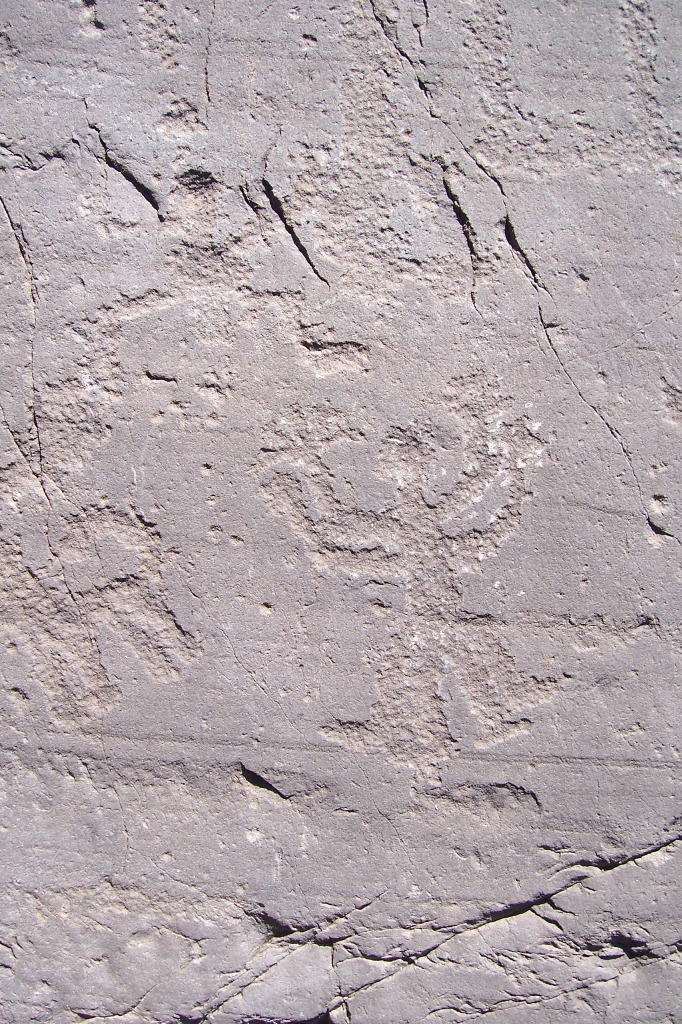
Sexual scene.
Area di Foppe, R. 6

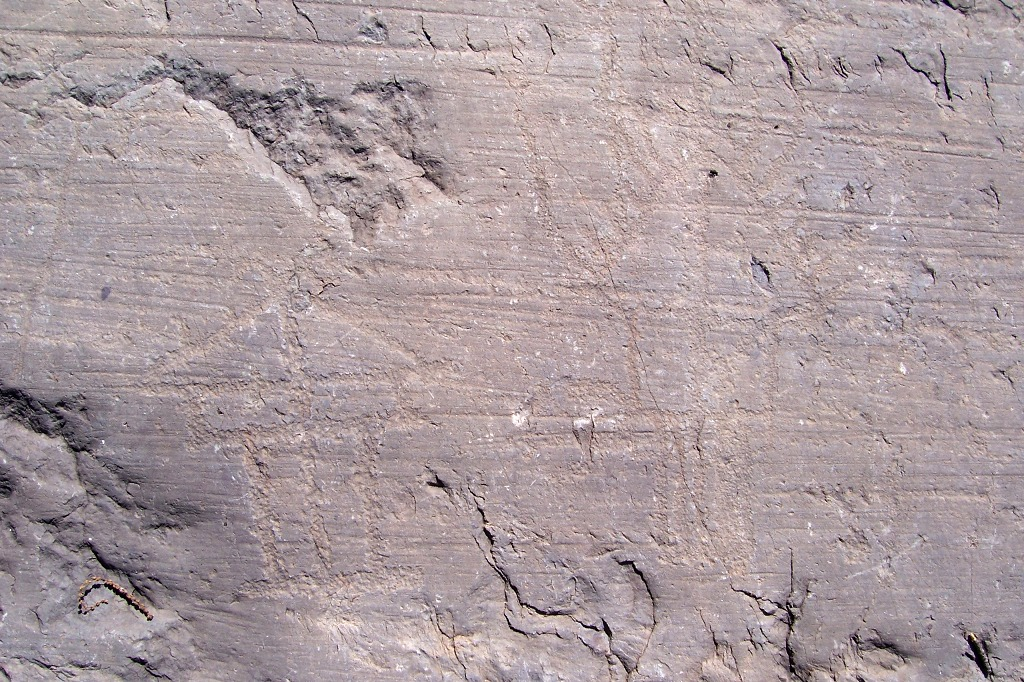
Figure of huts.
Area of Foppe, R. 6

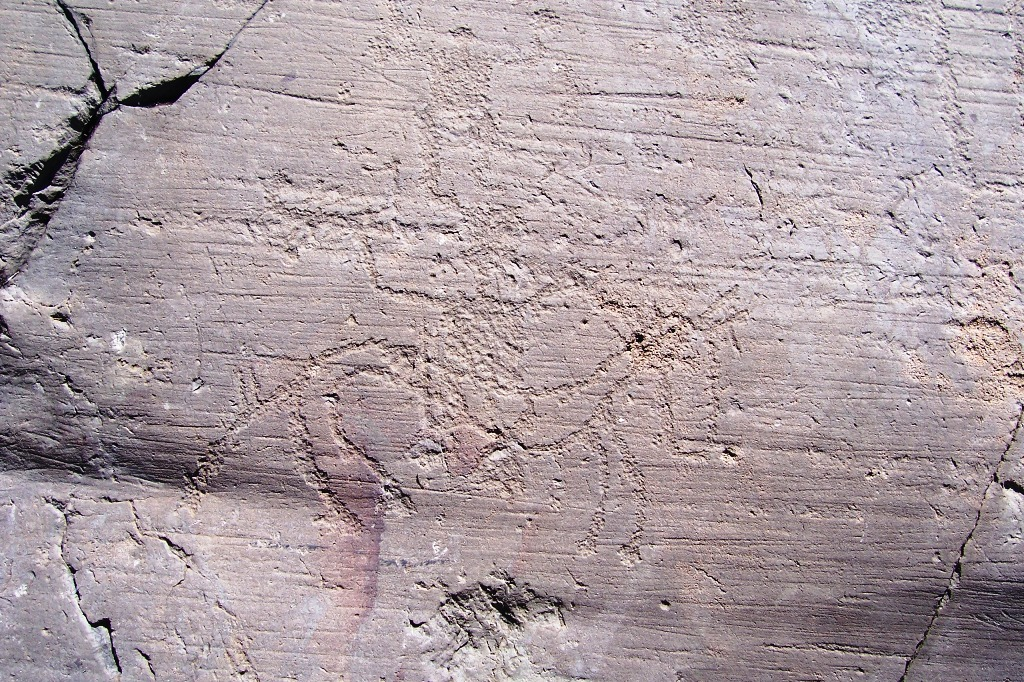
knight and horse in Golasecca style.
Area of Foppe, R. 6

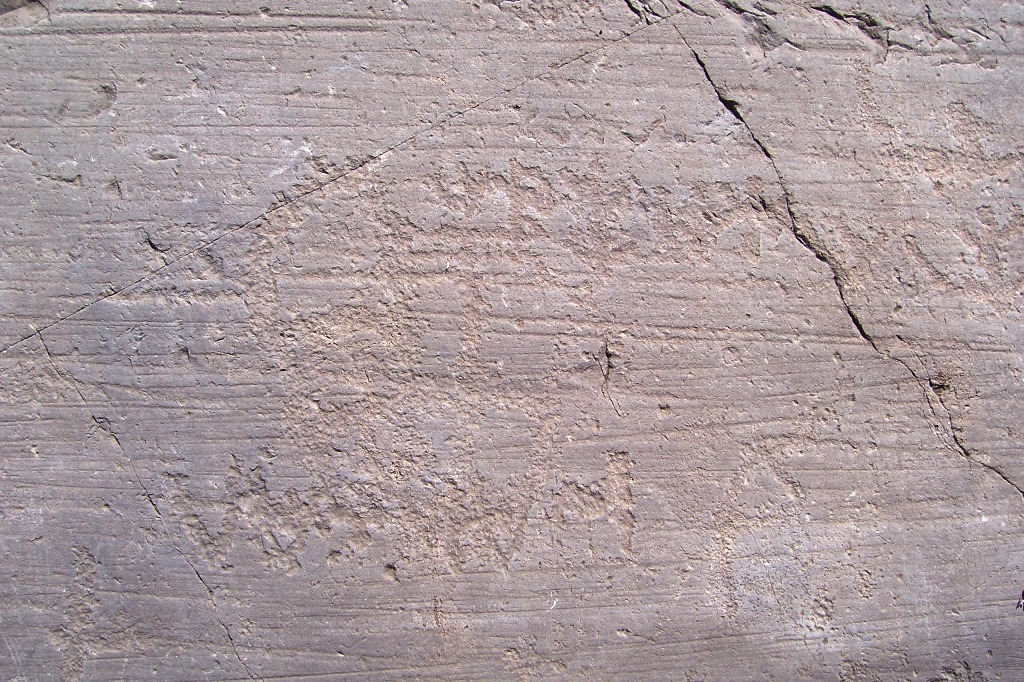
Inscription in camunic language.
Area of Foppe, R. 6

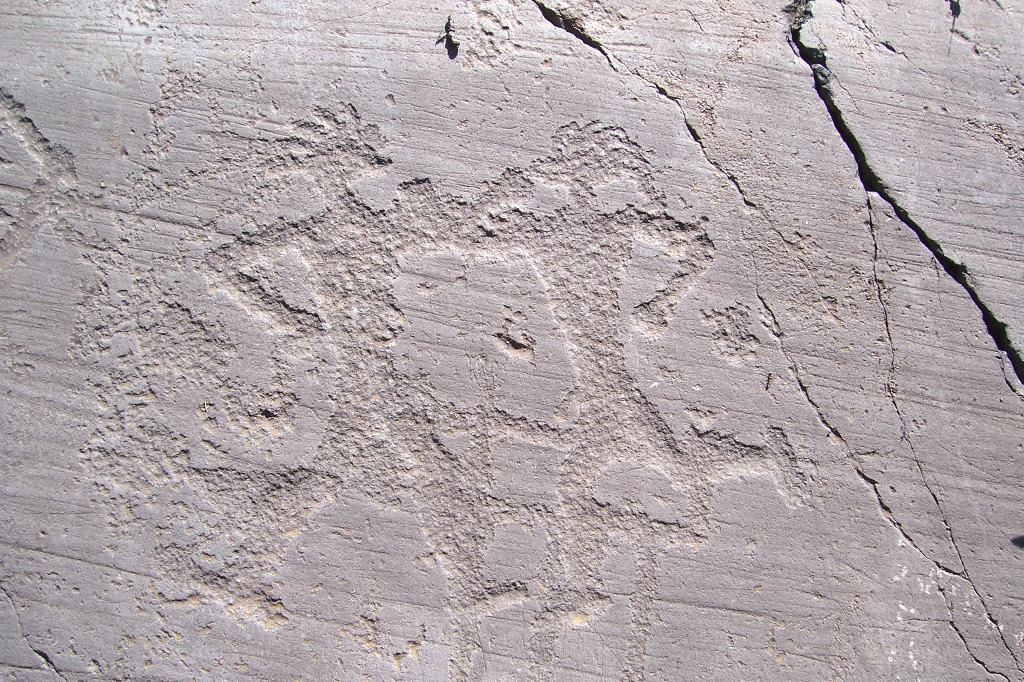
Boxing scene.
Area of Foppe, R. 6

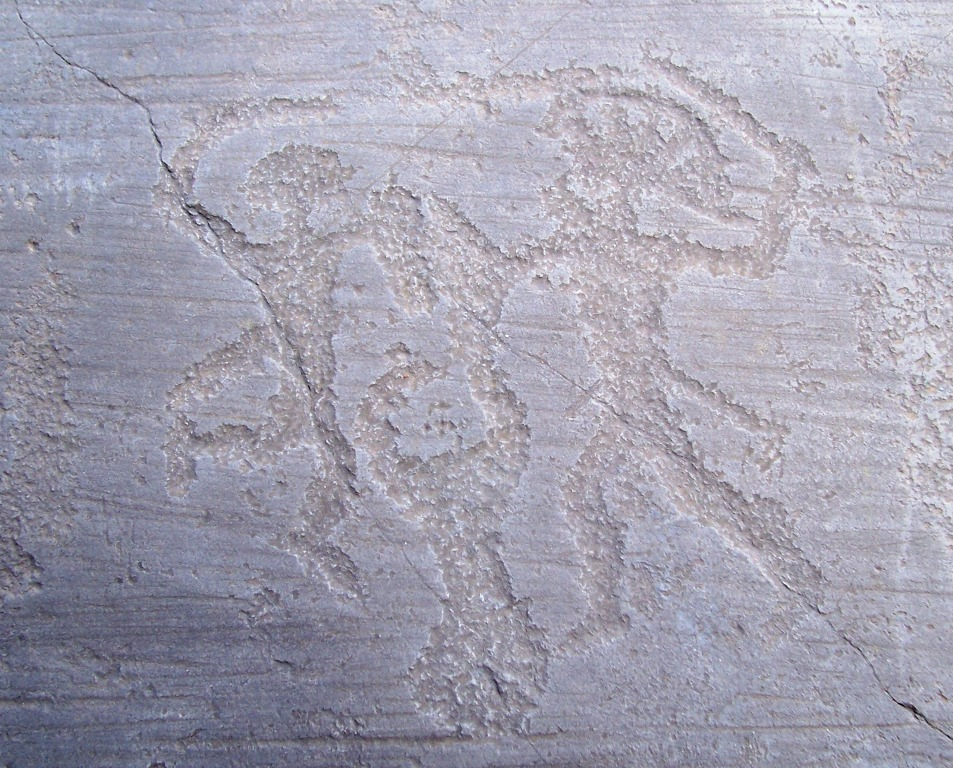
Duel scene.
Area of Foppe, R. 6

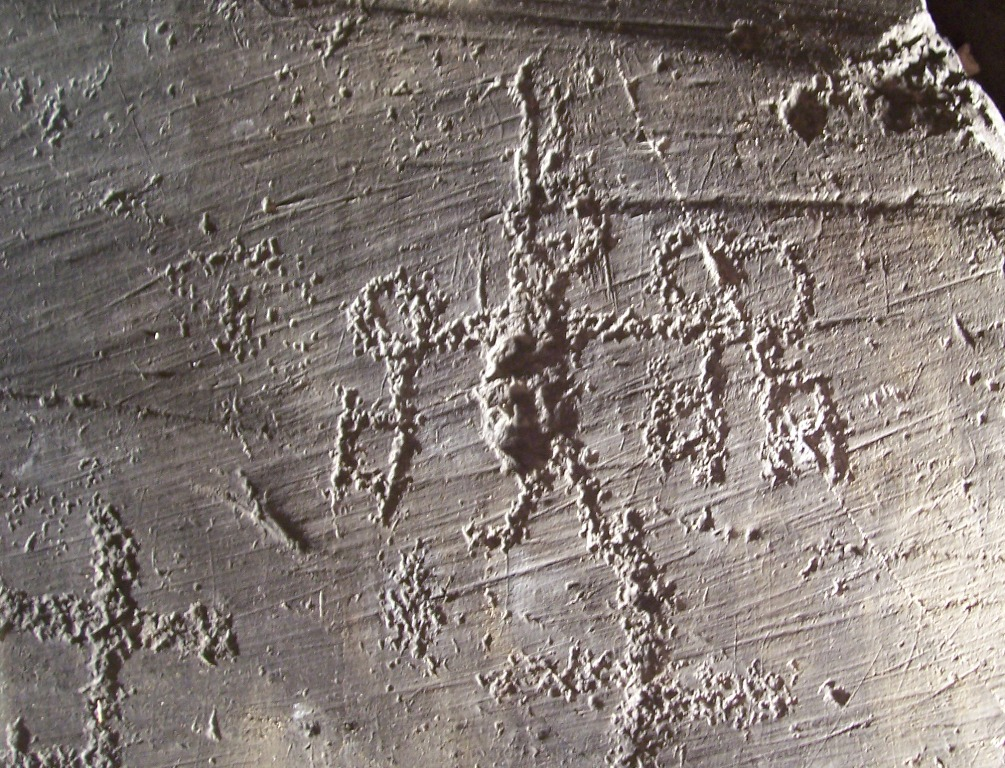
Human with keys.
Area of Campanine, R. 6

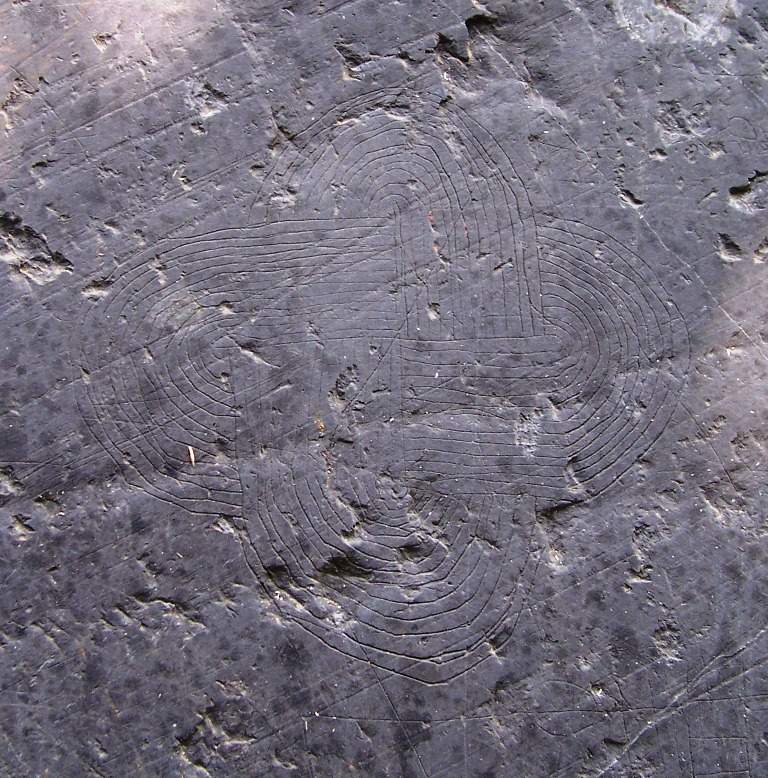
Solomon's knot.
Area of Campanine, R. 6

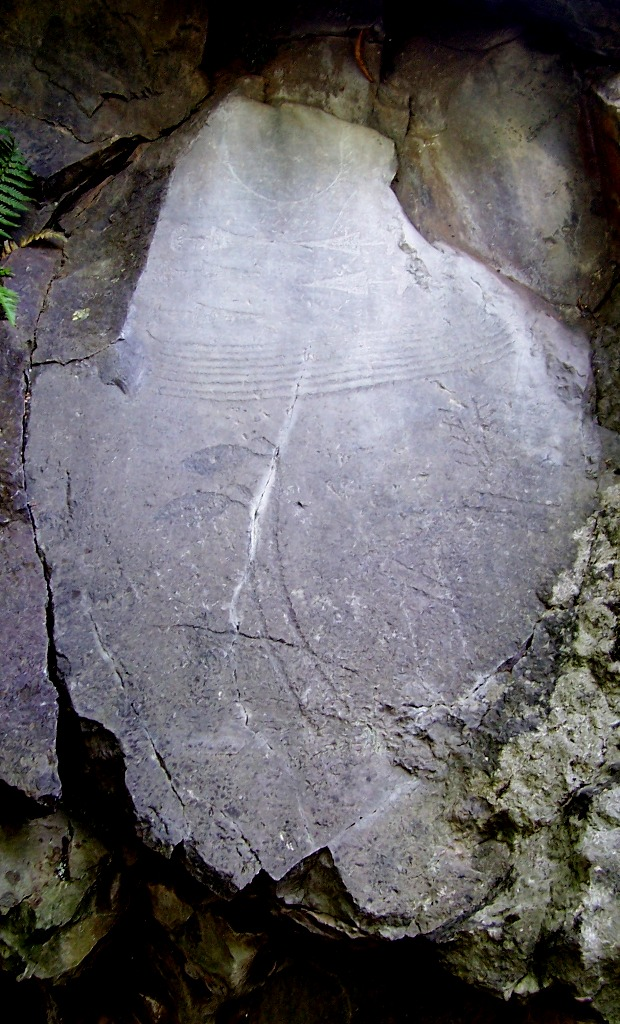
"Two pines aedicula".
Area of Plas, R. 1
