= Camunni =

Ancient population during the Iron Age

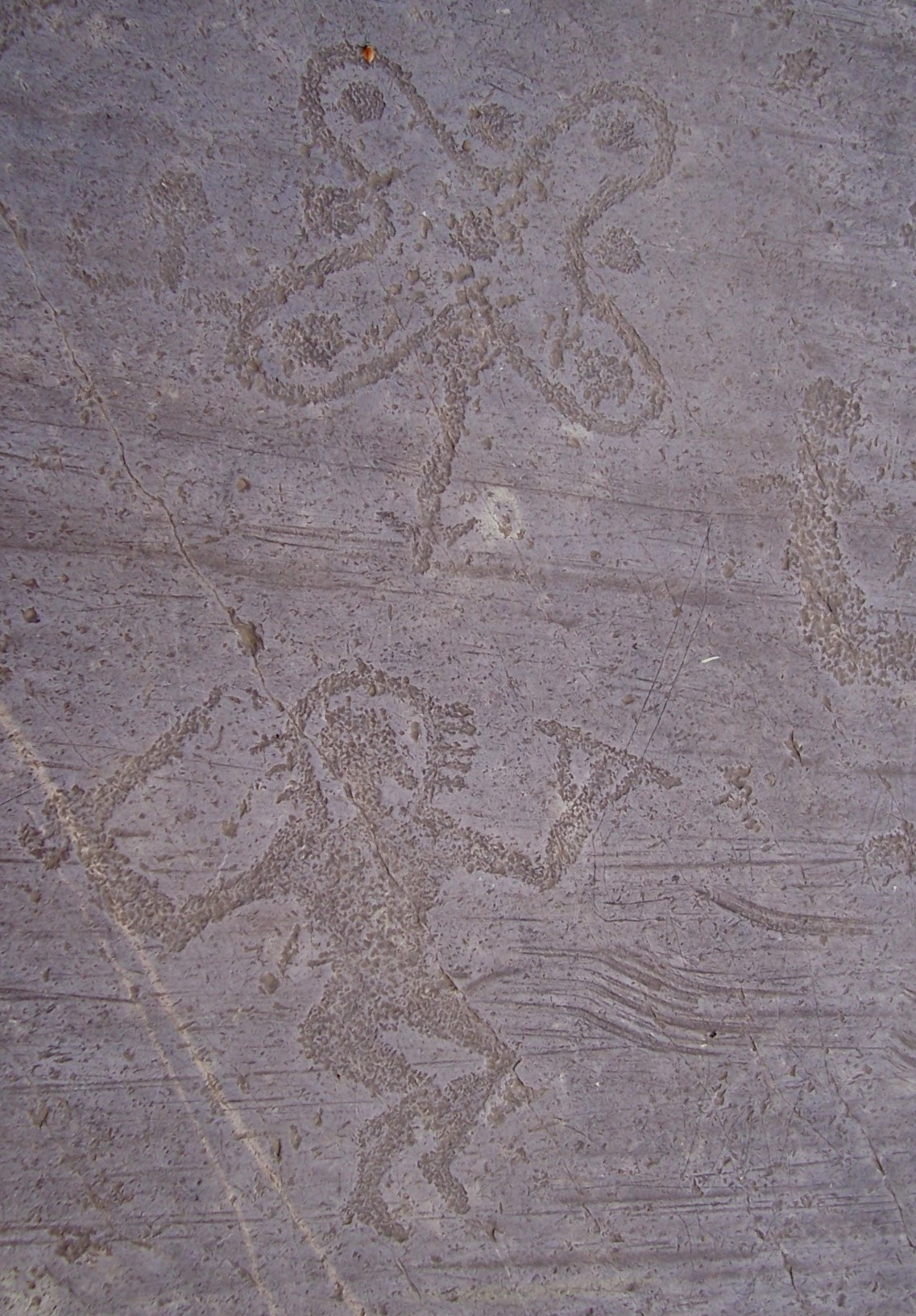
Rock Drawings in Valcamonica: Camunian rose and two human figures (one in martellina, the other in graffiti)

The Camuni or Camunni were an ancient population located in Val Camonica during the Iron Age (1st millennium BC); the Latin name Camunni was attributed to them by the authors of the 1st century. They are also called ancient Camuni, to distinguish them from the current inhabitants of the valley (the Camuni or Camunians). The Camunni were among the greatest producers of rock art in Europe; their name is linked to the famous rock engravings of Valcamonica.

A people of obscure origin, they lived in a region, the Val Camonica, that had already been the site of a cultural tradition dating back to the early Neolithic. The Camunni are mentioned by classical historiographical sources from the 1st century BC, corresponding to the Iron Age in Val Camonica (from the 12th century BC until about Romanization). In ancient Greek, Strabo referred to them as Καμοῦνοι (Kamounoi), while Cassius Dio called them Καμούννιοι (Kamounnioi).

Conquered by Rome at the beginning of the 1st century AD, the Camunni were gradually incorporated into the political and social structures of the Roman Empire as a self-governing polity called the Res Publica Camunnorum. They were granted Roman citizenship from the second half of the 1st century, with a rapid process of Latinization.

== History ==
Peoples of Cisalpine Gaul 391-192 BC.

=== The Camunni in classical sources ===
The Greek historian Strabo (63/64 BC–ca. 24 AD) described the Camunni as part of the Rhaetian peoples and related to the Lepontii (who according to Strabo were of Rhaetic stock, though modern linguists generally regard the Lepontic language as Celtic):

Ἑξῆς δὲ τὰ πρὸς ἕω μέρη τῶν ὀρῶν καὶ τὰ ἐπιστρέφοντα πρὸς νότον Ῥαιτοὶ καὶ Ὀυινδολικοὶ κατέχουσι, συνάπτοντες Ἐλουηττίοις καὶ Βοίοις· ἐπίκεινται γὰρ τοῖς ἐκείνων πεδίοις. Οἱ μὲν οὖν Ῥαιτοὶ μέχρι τῆς Ἰταλίας καθήκουσι τῆς ὑπὲρ Οὐήρωνος καὶ Κώμου. Καὶ ὅ γε Ῥαιτικὸς οἶνος, τῶν ἐν τοῖς Ἰταλικοῖς ἐπαινουμένων οὐκ ἀπολείπεσθαι δοκῶν, ἐν ταῖς τούτων ὑπωρείαις γίνεται· διατείνουσι δὲ καὶ μέχρι τῶν χωρίων, δι' ὧν ὁ Ῥῆνος φέρεται· τούτου δ' εἰσὶ τοῦ φύλου καὶ Ληπόντιοι καὶ Καμοῦνοι. Οἱ δὲ Ὀυινδολικοὶ καὶ Νωρικοὶ τὴν ἐκτὸς παρώρειαν κατέχουσι τὸ πλέον· μετὰ Βρεύνων καὶ Γεναύνων, ἤδη τούτων Ἰλλυριῶν. Ἅπαντες δ' οὗτοι καὶ τῆς Ἰταλίας τὰ γειτονεύοντα μέρη κατέτρεχον ἀεὶ καὶ τῆς Ἐλουηττίων καὶ Σηκοανῶν καὶ Βοίων καὶ Γερμανῶν. Ἰταμώτατοι δὲ τῶν μὲν Ὀυινδολικῶν ἐξητάζοντο Λικάττιοι καὶ Κλαυτηνάτιοι καὶ Ὀυέννωνες, τῶν δὲ Ῥαιτῶν Ῥουκάντιοι καὶ Κωτουάντιοι.

— Strabo, Geography IV, 6.8

Next, in order, come those parts of the mountains that are towards the east, and those that bend round towards the south: the Rhaeti and the Vindelici occupy them, and their territories join those of the Elvetii and the Boii; for their territories overlook the plains of those peoples. Now the Rhaeti reach down as far as that part of Italy which is above Verona and Comum (moreover, the "Rhaetic" wine, which has the repute of not being inferior to the approved wines of the Italic regions, is made in the foothills of the Rhaetic Alps), and also extend as far as the districts through which the Rhenus runs; the Lepontii, also, and Camuni, belong to this stock. But the Vindelici and Norici occupy the greater part of the outer side of the mountain, along with the Breuni and the Genauni, the two peoples last named being Illyrians. All these peoples used to overrun, from time to time, the neighbouring parts, not only of Italy, but also of the country of the Elvetii, the Sequani, the Boii, and the Germani. The Licattii, the Clautenatii, and the Vennones proved to be the boldest warriors of all the Vindelici, as did the Rucantii and the Cotuantii of all the Rhaeti.

The Roman historian Pliny the Elder (23–79 AD), citing the Origines of Cato the Elder (234–149 BC), spoke instead of the Camunni as one of several tribes of the Euganei:

Verso deinde in Italiam pectore Alpium Latini iuris Euganeae gentes, quarum oppida XXXIIII enumerat Cato. ex iis Trumplini, venalis cum agris suis populus, dein Camunni conpluresque similes finitimis adtributi municipis

— Pliny the Elder, Naturalis Historia, III.133-134.

Turning then to the side of the Alps which fronts Italy, we have the Euganean nations enjoying Latin rights, and of whom Cato enumerates thirty-four towns. Among these are the Triumplini, a people who were sold with their territory; and then the Camuni, and several similar tribes, each of them in the jurisdiction of its neighbouring municipal town.

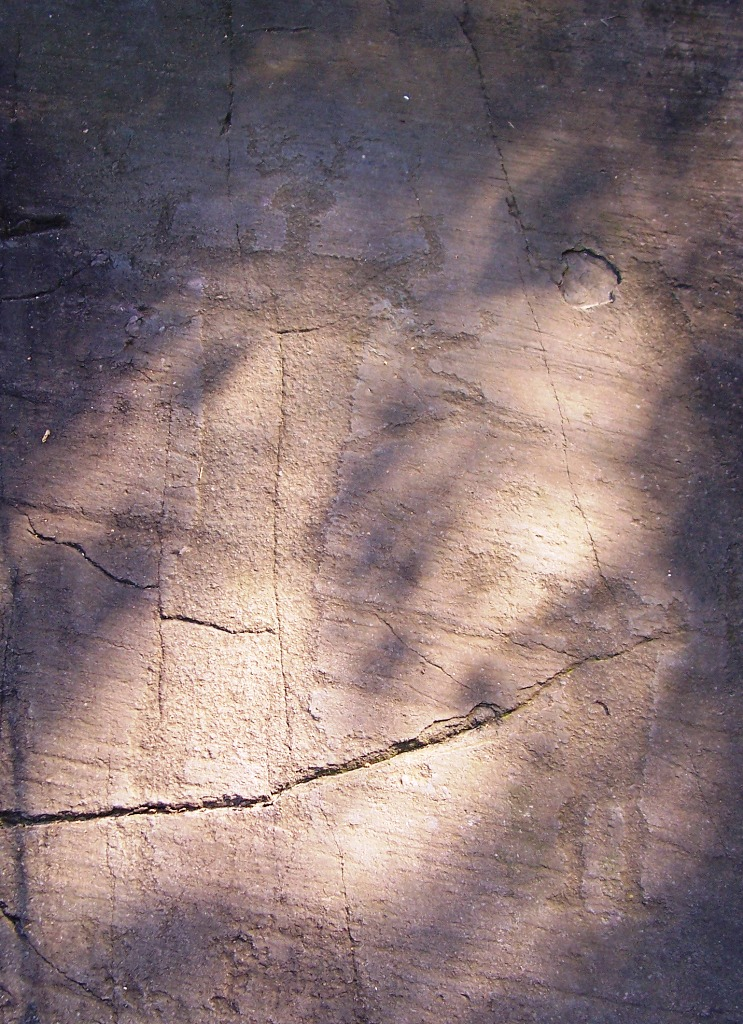
A rock carving of Cernunnos in the National park of Naquane (Capo di Ponte)

=== Contacts with the Etruscans and Celts ===
The Etruscans, already widespread in the Po Valley, had contacts with Alpine populations by the 5th century BC. Surviving traces of Etruscan cultural influence are recorded in the aforementioned rock art in over two hundred texts written in the Camunic alphabet, which is a variant of the North Etruscan alphabet. At the beginning of the 4th century BC, the Celtic Gauls arrived in Italy. Coming from Transalpine Gaul, they settled in the Po plain and came in touch with the Camunian population. Some of the petroglyphs in Valcamonica with figures of Celtic deities such as Kernunnos attest this Gaulish presence.

=== The Roman conquest ===
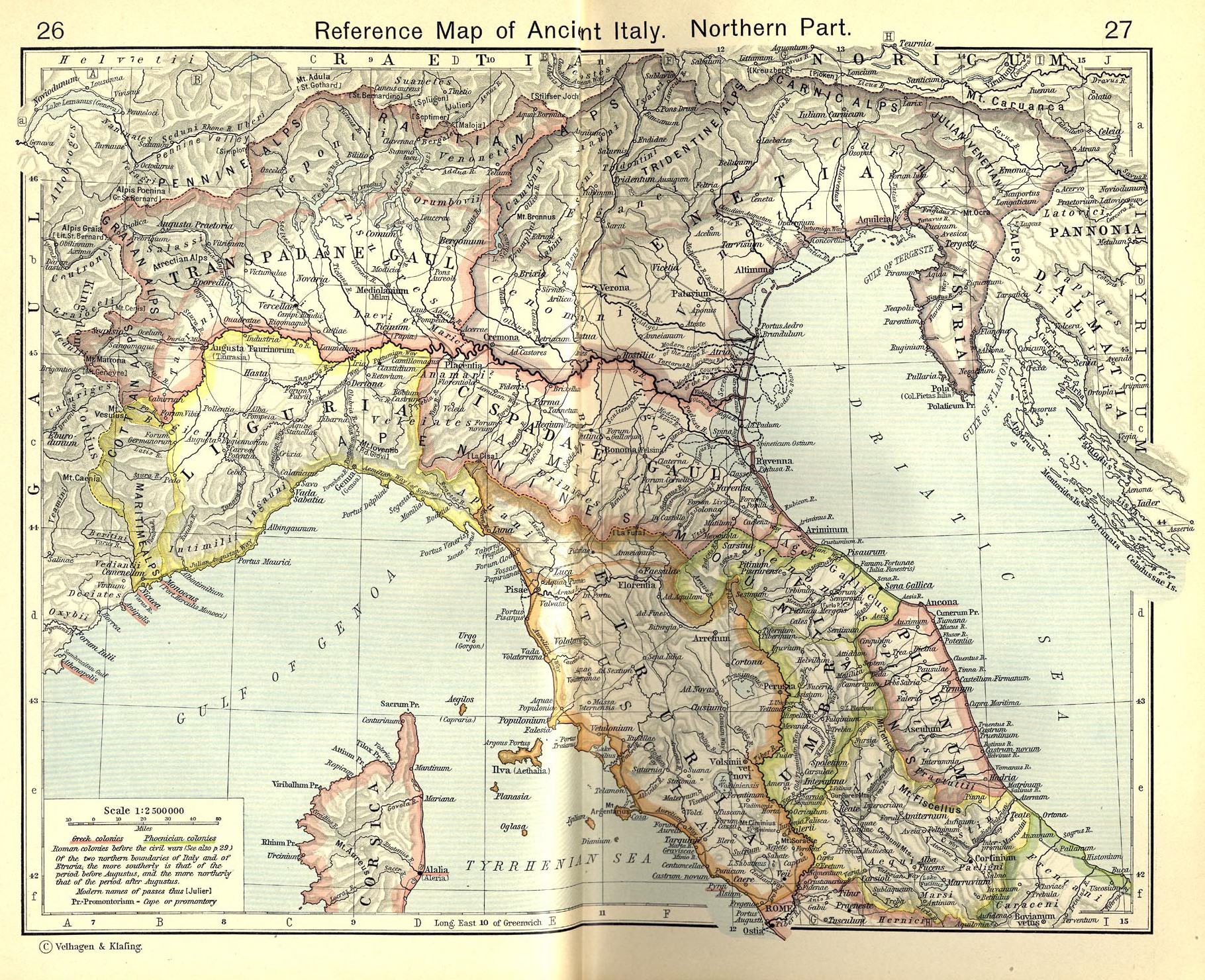
Northern Italy according to William R. Shepherd's Historical Atlas; the Camunni are at the western end of Venetia

Val Camonica was subjected to Rome during the campaigns of Augustus to conquer Raetia and the Alpine arc, conducted by his generals Nero Claudius Drusus and Tiberius (the future emperor) against the mountain peoples in 16–15 BC. Publius Silius Nerva, governor of Illyricum, was to complete the conquest of the eastern Alpine front, which reached from the valley of Como to Lake Garda (therefore including the Valcamonica), in addition to the Vennoneti of Vinschgau.

The Roman conquest is also mentioned by the Roman historian Cassius Dio writing in Greek:

Καὶ γὰρ Καμμούνιοι καὶ Οὐέννιοι, Ἀλπικὰ γένη, ὅπλα τε ἀντήραντο καὶ νικηθέντες ὑπὸ Πουπλίου Σιλίου ἐχειρώθησαν.

— Cassius Dio, Historia Romana, book 54

The Camunni and Vennoni, Alpine tribes, took up arms against the Romans, but were conquered and subdued by Publius Silius.

This conquest was celebrated in the Trophy of the Alps (Tropaeum Alpium), a Roman monument erected in 7–6 BC and located in the French town of La Turbie, whose frontal inscription named the conquered Alpine peoples:

· GENTES ALPINAE DEVICTAE TRVMPILINI · CAMVNNI · VENOSTES ·

— Tropaeum Alpium, La Turbie

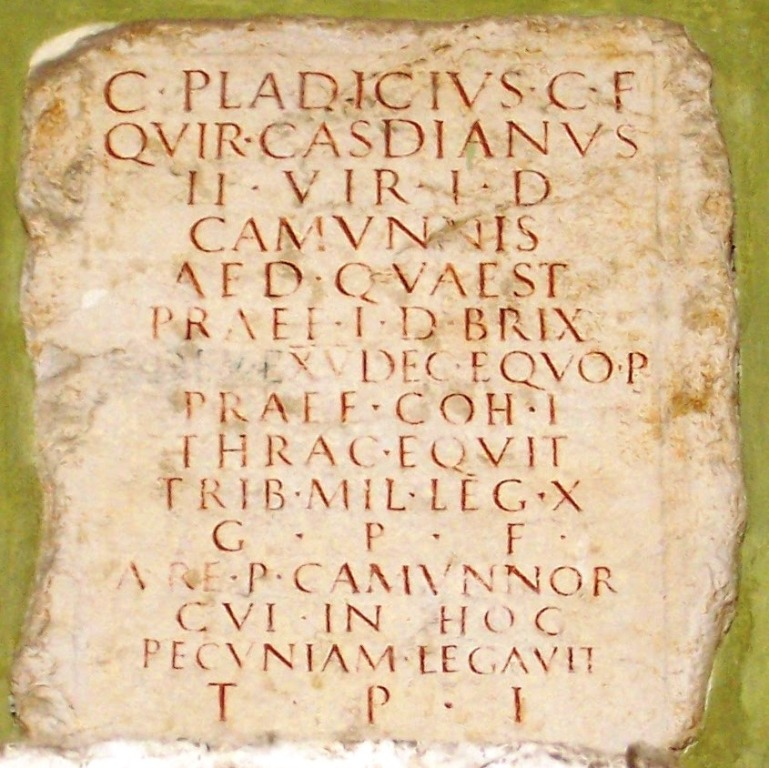
Inscription of the Roman period found in Cividate Camuno, containing the terms: QUIR(ina), CAMUNNIS and RE P(ublica) CAMUNNOR(um)

After the Roman conquest, the Camunni were annexed to the nearest cities in a condition of semi-subjection through the practice of adtributio, which allowed them to maintain their own tribal constitution while the dominant city became the administrative, judicial, and fiscal center. The city that the Camunni were assigned to was probably Brixia. At first they were assigned the status of peregrinus, and then they obtained Roman citizenship; in the Flavian Age they were assigned to the Quirina tribe, while they maintained a certain self-government; in fact, a Res Publica Camunnorum has been recorded.

Romanization proceeded from Civitas Camunnorum (Cividate Camuno), a city founded by the Romans around 23 BC, during the principate of Tiberius. Beginning in the 1st century, the Camunni were included in stable Roman political and social structures, as evidenced by the numerous legionaries, artisans, and even gladiators of Camunian origins in several areas of the Roman Empire. Camunian religion went through the process of interpretatio Romana, forming a syncretic combination with Roman religion.

== Religion ==
Camunian stone carvings, 70–80% of which date to the Bronze Age, are thought to have held value for celebratory, commemorative, initiatory, and propitiatory rituals. The Sanctuary of Minerva, found at Spinera between Cividate Camuno and Breno in 1986, dates to the Roman period and was finely decorated with mosaics.

The beginning of the Middle Ages coincided with the arrival of the Christian religion among the Camunni. The 4th and 5th centuries witnessed the destruction of the ancient places of worship, with the destruction of statue menhirs in Ossimo and Cemmo and the burning of the Sanctuary of Minerva.

== Language ==
Surviving traces of the language spoken by the Camunni are scarce and undeciphered. Among the Rock Drawings in Valcamonica there are some inscriptions written in the Camunic language, written in a northern variant of the Etruscan alphabet. There is insufficient knowledge about Camunic to be able to determine whether it belongs to a broader language family.

== Bibliography ==
=== Primary sources ===
- Cassius Dio, Roman History
- Pliny the Elder, Naturalis Historia
- Strabo, Geographica
- Trophy of the Alps

=== Historiographical literature ===
- Raffaele De Marinis, Le popolazioni alpine di stirpe retica in G. Pugliese Carratelli (a cura di) Italia omnium terrarum alumna, Milano, Garzanti-Scheiwiller, 1988. pp. 95–155
- Lino Ertani, La Valle Camonica attraverso la storia, Esine, Tipolitografia Valgrigna, 1996.
- Francesco Fedele, L'uomo, le Alpi, la Valcamonica - 20.000 anni di storia al Castello di Breno, Boario Terme, La Cittadina, 1988.
- Valeria Mariotti, Il teatro e l'anfiteatro di Cividate Camuno, Arti grafiche BMB, 2004. ISBN 88-7814-254-9
- Pietro Paolo Ormanico, Considerationi sopra alcvne memorie della Religione Antica dei Camvli, ò Camvni, Bornato, Sardini Editrice [1639], 1983.
- Umberto Sansoni, Silvana Gavaldo, L'arte rupestre del Pià d'Ort: la vicenda di un santuario preistorico alpino, Edizioni del Centro, 1995.
- Ronald Syme, "The Alps" in Cambridge Ancient History, Cambridge, Cambridge University Press, Vol. VIII.

== See also ==
- Ancient peoples of Italy
- Rock Drawings in Valcamonica
- Val Camonica
