= Camunic language =

Ancient language of the Central Alps

Camunic
- Region: Val Camonica
- Ethnicity: Camunni
- Era: first millennium BC
- Language family: unclassified (Tyrsenian?/Celtic?)

Language codes
- ISO 639-3: xcc
- Glottolog: camu1235

The Camunic language is an extinct language that was spoken in the 1st millennium BC in Val Camonica, a valley in the Central Alps. The language is sparsely attested to an extent that makes any classification attempt uncertain—even the discussion of whether it should be considered a pre–Indo-European or an Indo-European language has remained indecisive. Among several suggestions, it has been hypothesized that Camunic is related to the Raetic language from the Tyrsenian language family, or to the Celtic languages.

== Language ==
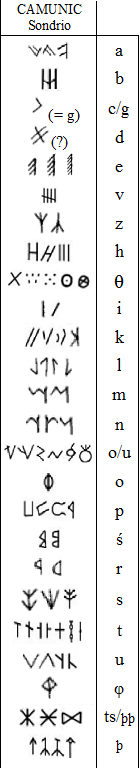
Alphabet of Sondrio

The extant corpus is carved on rock. There are at least 170 known inscriptions, the majority of which are only a few words long. The writing system used is a variant of the north-Etruscan alphabet, known as the Camunian alphabet or alphabet of Sondrio. Longer inscriptions show that Camunic writing used boustrophedon.

Its name derives from the people of the Camunni, who lived during the Iron Age in Valcamonica and were the creators of many of the stone carvings in the area. Abecedariums found in Nadro and Piancogno have been dated to between 500 BC and 50 AD.

The amount of material is insufficient to fully decipher the language. Some scholars think it may be related to Raetic and to Etruscan, but it is considered premature to make such affiliation. Other scholars suggest that Camunic could be a Celtic or another unknown Indo-European language.

== Transliteration ==
Glyph	Tibiletti Bruno 1992	Zavaroni 2004	Martinotti 2009
	-	A	-
	Αα	A	A
	Αα	A	-
	Ββ	B	B (V?)
	Ββ	B	B (V?)
	Δδ	-	D
	h	D (?)	-
	Εε	E	E
	Εε	E	E
	Εε	E	E
	Ϝϝ	V	-
	Γγ	G	K (G?)
	Γγ	G	-
	h	H	J (ii/h/η?)
	-	H	-
	Ιι	I	I
	Ιι	I	I
	-	K	K (G?)
	Λλ	L	L
	Λλ	L	L
	Μμ	M	M
	Μμ	M	M
	Νν	N	N
	Νν	N	N
	Ϙϙ	O	Φ (Q?)
	-	P	-
	Ππ	P	P
	Ρρ	R	R
	Ρρ	R	R
	Ξξ	S	χ
	Σσς	S	S
	Σσς	S	S
	Χχ	T	T
	Ττ	T	T
	-	T	I
	Ψψ	Θθ	-
	-	Θθ	Θθ
	-	TS - Ϸϸ	-
	Φφ	TS - Ϸϸ	χ
	Υυ	U - W	U
	-	U - W	U
	Ζζ	Z	χ
	Ζζ	Z	χ

== Gallery ==
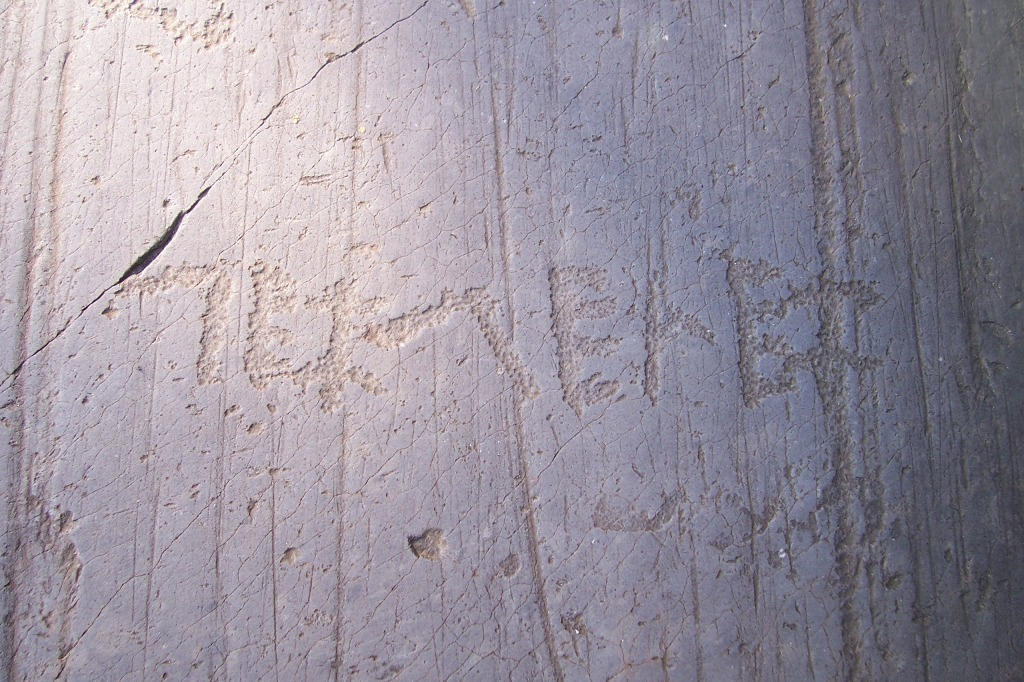
Inscription from Capo di Ponte (Val Camonica)

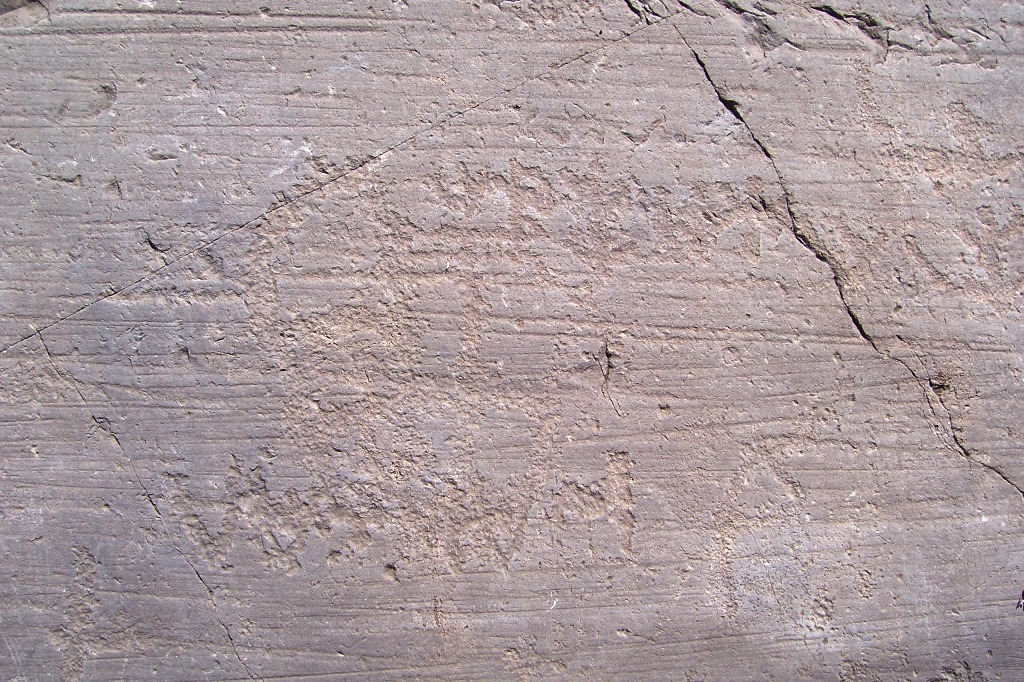
Inscription from Nadro (Val Camonica)

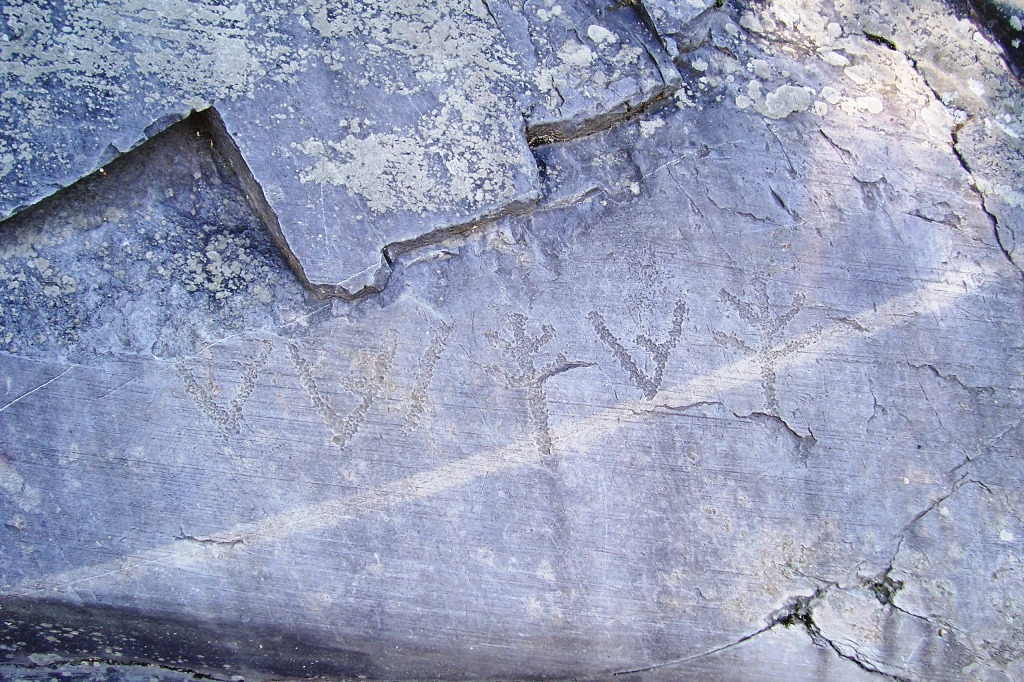
Inscription from Nadro (Val Camonica)

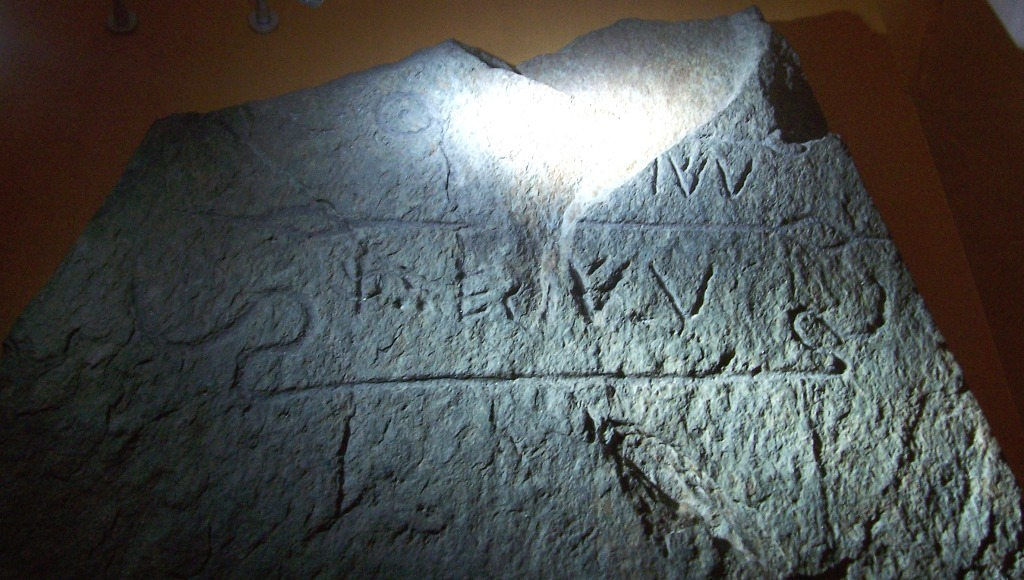
Inscription from the museum of Sondrio (Valtellina)

== See also ==
- Camunni
- Rock Drawings in Valcamonica
- Val Camonica

== Bibliography ==
- Mancini, Alberto. 1980. "Le iscrizioni della Valcamonica" in Studi Urbinati di storia, filosofia e letteratura. Supplemento linguistico 2, pp. 75–166.
- Mancini, Alberto. 1991. "Iscrizioni retiche e iscrizioni camune. Due ambiti a confronto" in Quaderni del Dipartimento di Linguistica, Università degli studi di Firenze 2, pp. 77–93.
- Marchesini, Simona. 2011. "Alla ricerca del modello perduto. Sulla genesi dell’alfabeto camuno", Palaeohispanica 11, pp. 155-171
- Markey, Thomas L. 2008. "Shared symbolics, genre difusion, token perceptions and late literacy in North-western Europe" in NOWELE 54/55, pp. 5–62. doi:10.1075/nowele.54-55.01mar
- Morandi, Alessandro. 2004. Epigrafia e lingua dei Celti d'Italia, vol. II. Celti d’Italia, ed. by Paola Piana Agostinetti (Popoli e civiltà dell'Italia antica, 12), Roma 2004
- Prosdocimi, Aldo Luigi. 1965. "Per un'edizione delle iscrizioni della Valcamonica", in Studi Etruschi 33, pp. 574–599.
- Schumacher, Stefan. 2007. "Val Camonica, Inschriften" in Reallexikon der germanischen Altertumskunde. Band 35: Speckstein bis Zwiebel. Ed. Heinrich Beck et al., Berlin – New York, pp. 334–337.
- Tibiletti Bruno, Maria Grazia. 1978. "Camuno, retico e pararetico", in Lingue e dialetti dell'Italia antica ('Popoli e civiltà dell'Italia antica', 6), ed. by A. L. Prosdocimi, Roma 1978, pp. 209–255.
- Tibiletti Bruno, Maria Grazia. 1990. "Nuove iscrizioni camune" in Quaderni camuni 49–50, pp. 29–171.
- Tibiletti Bruno, Maria Grazia. 1992. "Gli alfabetari" in Quaderni camuni 60, pp. 309–380.
