= Cimbergo =

Cimbergo Himbèrg
- Comune
- Comune di Cimbergo
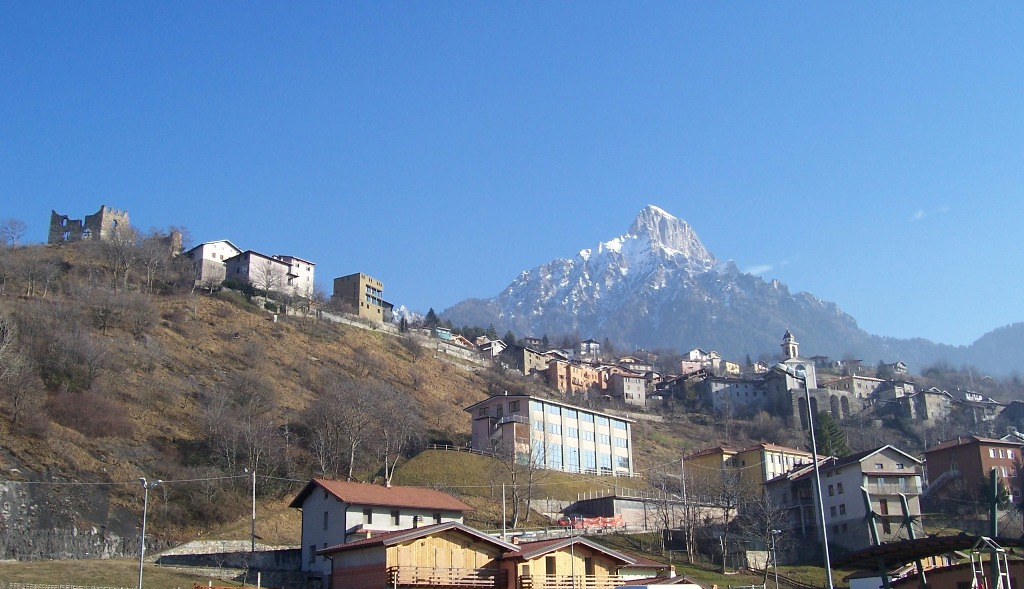
- Cimbergo's panorama

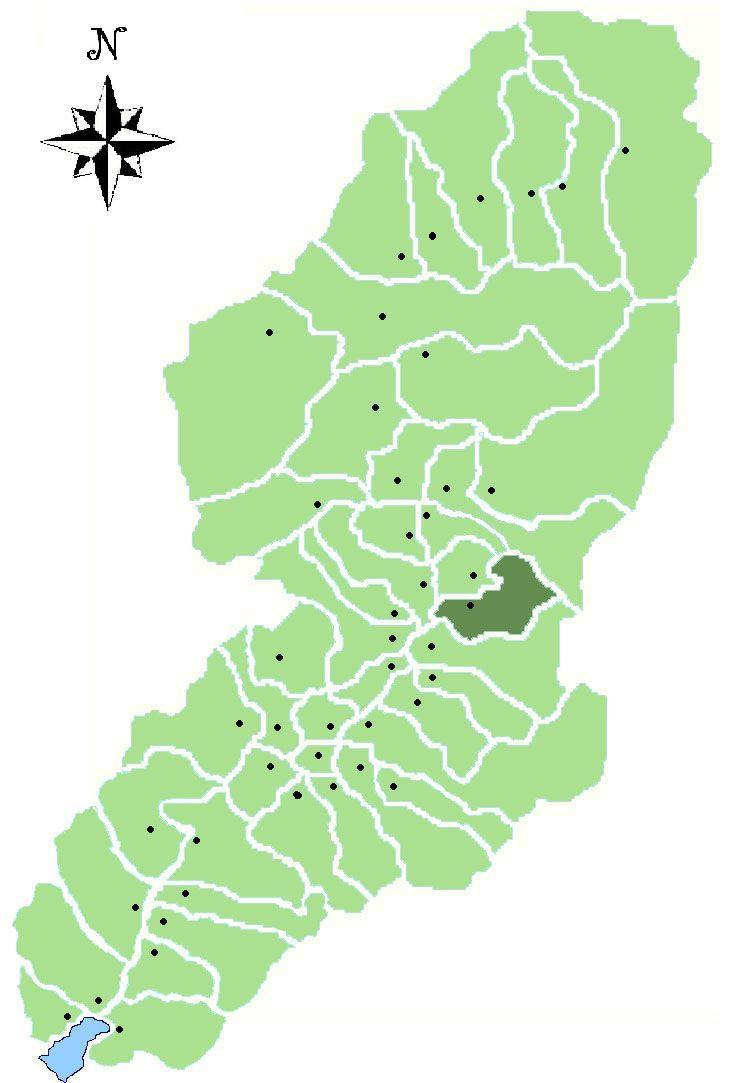
- Comune of Cimbergo in Val Camonica

- Location within Italy Location within Lombardy
- Coordinates: 46°01′30″N 10°22′0″E
- Country: Italy
- Region: Lombardy
- Province: Brescia (BS)

Area
  - Total: 26 km^{2} (10 sq mi)
- Elevation: 850 m (2,790 ft)

Population (2011)
  - Total: 572
  - Density: 22/km^{2} (57/sq mi)
- Demonym: Cimberghesi
- Time zone: UTC+1 (CET)
  - Summer (DST): UTC+2 (CEST)
- Postal code: 25040
- Dialing code: 0364
- Patron saint: Santa Maria Assunta
- Saint day: 15 agosto
- Website: Official website

Cimbergo (Camunian: Himbèrg) is an Italian comune of 572 inhabitants in Val Camonica, province of Brescia, in Lombardy.

== Geography ==
Cimbergo is located above the left bank of the river Oglio. Neighbouring communes are Capo di Ponte, Cedegolo, Ceto, Cevo and Paspardo.

== History ==
The area of Cimbergo was populated by ancient: there are hundreds stone carvings on its territory.

In 1378 Guelphs and Ghibellines of Valcamonica tried to sign a peace in the Castle of Cimbergo.

Bartholomew of Cemmo on the 28 May 1430 obtained the investiture in the Basilica of San Marco in Venice of the county of Cemmo-Cimbergo.

Bartholomew lost the county before the end of the 1430s, because of its overtly political side of Milan, so it was donated to Trent counts Lodrone.

Between 1805 and 1809 Cimbergo joined Paspardo with the name of "Cimbergo con Paspardo".

In 1810 the municipality of Cimbergo buy the castle from Lodrone who reside there for some time and turns it into a cemetery, after which the land will be sold to individuals. In 1849, due to the failure of church bells, you decide to use the material for re-use of the castle, now abandoned, to build a new church-tower.

Between 1927 and 1947, is again united to Cimbergo Paspardo with the name of Cimbergo-Paspardo.

In 2008 the municipality of Cimbergo unable to regain all the land around the castle.

== Monuments and places of interest ==
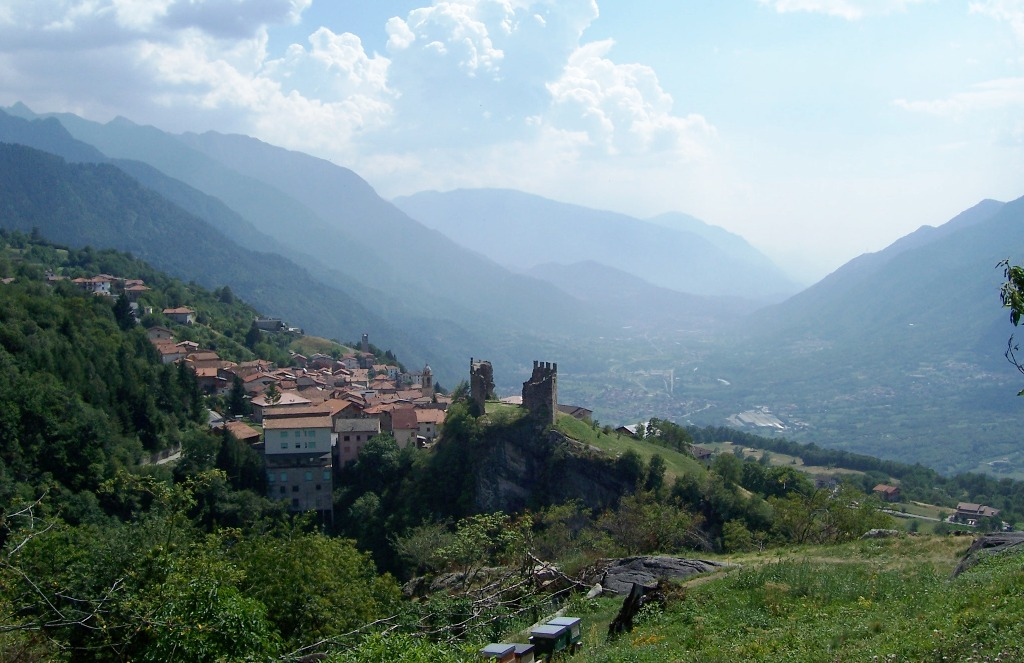
Castle of Cimbergo.

=== Religious architectures ===
The churches of Cimbergo are:

- Parish Church of Santa Maria Assunta, formerly dedicated to St. Martin.
- The church of San Giovanni Battista.

=== Military buildings ===
- Castle of Cimbergo

=== UNESCO sites ===
- Reserva naturale Incioni rupestri di Ceto, Cimbergo e Paspardo.

== Society ==
=== Traditions and folklore ===
The scütüm are in camunian dialect nicknames, sometimes personal, elsewhere showing the characteristic features of a community. The one which characterize the people of Cimbergo is Himbergòcc, Bahtì, Baitì.
