= Incudine =

Incudine Incüzen
- Comune
- Comune di Incudine
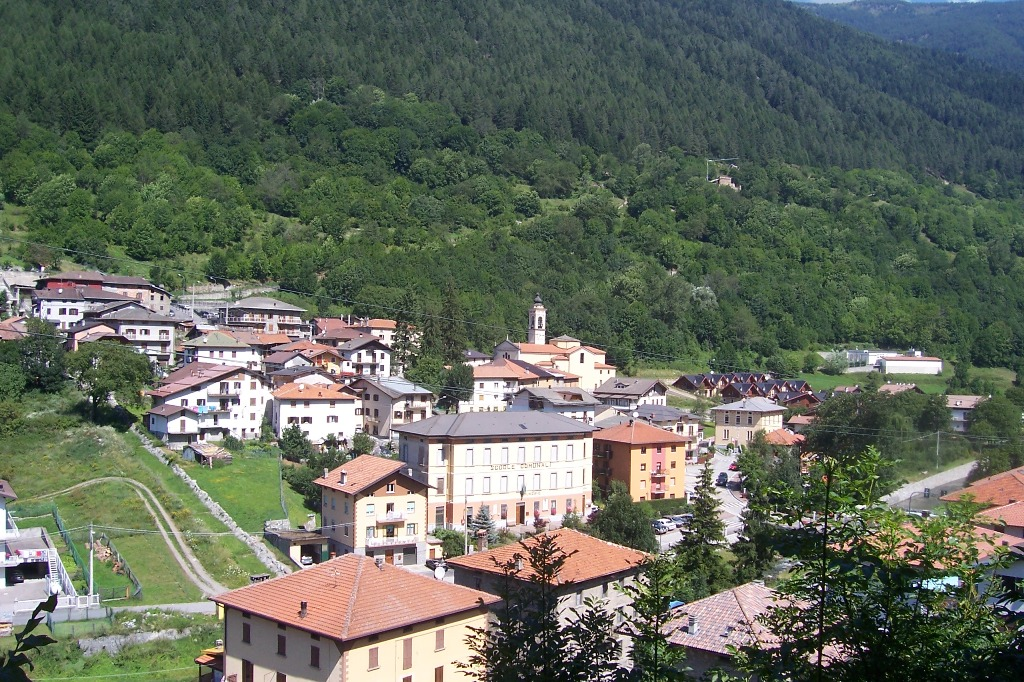

- Coat of arms

- Location within Italy Location within Lombardy
- Coordinates: 46°13′20″N 10°21′30″E
- Country: Italy
- Region: Lombardy
- Province: Brescia (BS)

Government
  - Mayor: Bruno Serini

Area
  - Total: 20.23 km^{2} (7.81 sq mi)
- Elevation: 910 m (2,990 ft)

Population (30 November 2009)
  - Total: 407
  - Density: 20.1/km^{2} (52.1/sq mi)
- Demonym: Incudinesi
- Time zone: UTC+1 (CET)
  - Summer (DST): UTC+2 (CEST)
- Postal code: 25040
- Dialing code: 0364
- Website: Official website

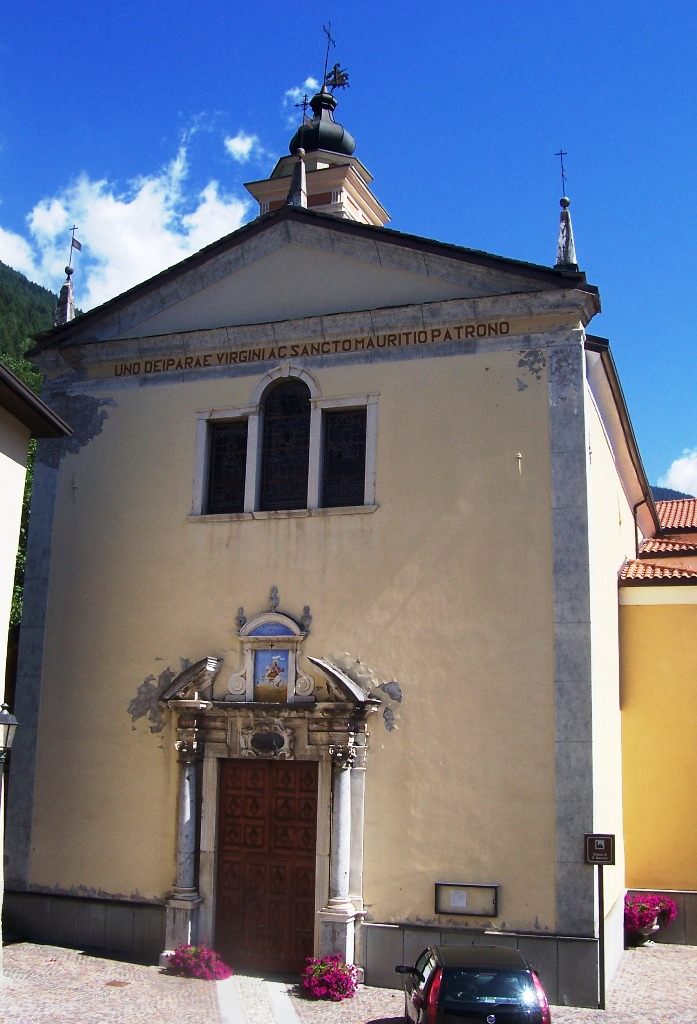
Parish church

Incudine (Camunian: Incüzen) is a town and comune in the province of Brescia, in Lombardy, northern Italy.

== Monuments and attractions ==
=== Religious architecture ===
The churches in Incudine are:

- San Maurizio Church, built in the 16th century with the tower bell dating back to the 18th century. The building was expanded at the beginning of the 20th century.
- San Bernardino Church, located in Vago; it dates back to the 17th century.
- San Vito e Sant'Anna, located at the bottom of San Vito peak at 1860m. Its dimensions are relevant to the environmental context in which it is situated.
