= Camunian rose =

Prehistoric symbol from the petroglyphs of Valcamonica

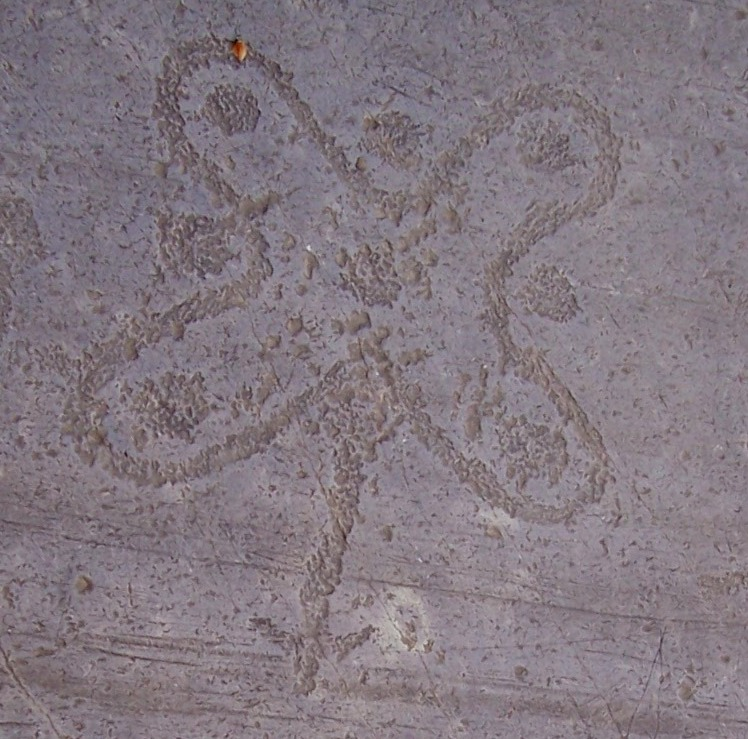
Camunian rose in loc. Foppe of Nadro

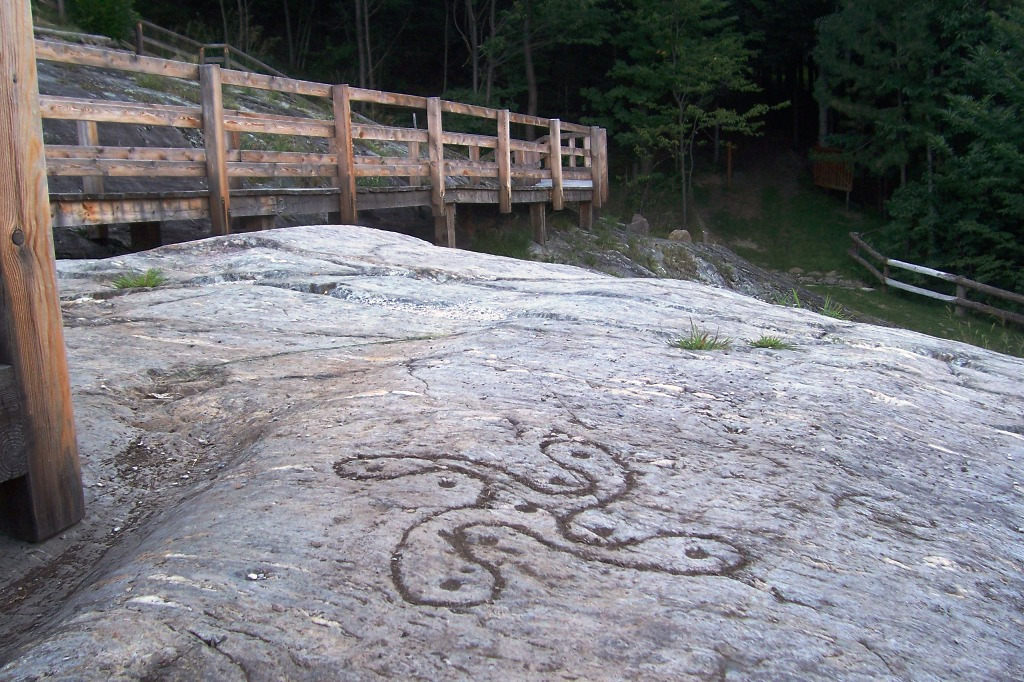
"Camunian rose" as swastika in loc. Carpene of Sellero

The Camunian rose (Italian: rosa camuna; Lombard: roeusa camuna/rösa camüna) is the name given to a particular symbol represented among the rock carvings of Camonica Valley (Brescia, Italy). It consists of a meandering closed line that winds around nine cup marks. It can be symmetrical, asymmetrical or form a swastika.

== Meaning and variations ==
Many theories exist about its meaning: Emmanuel Anati suggests that it might symbolize a complex religious concept, perhaps a solar symbol linked to the astral movement. In Val Camonica this motif dates back to the Iron Age, particularly from the 7th to 1st centuries BC. Only one doubtful case is datable at the Final Bronze Age (1,100 BC). These figures are placed mainly in the Middle Camonica Valley (Capo di Ponte, Foppe of Nadro, Sellero, Ceto and Paspardo), but numerous cases are in the Low Valley too (Darfo Boario Terme and Esine).

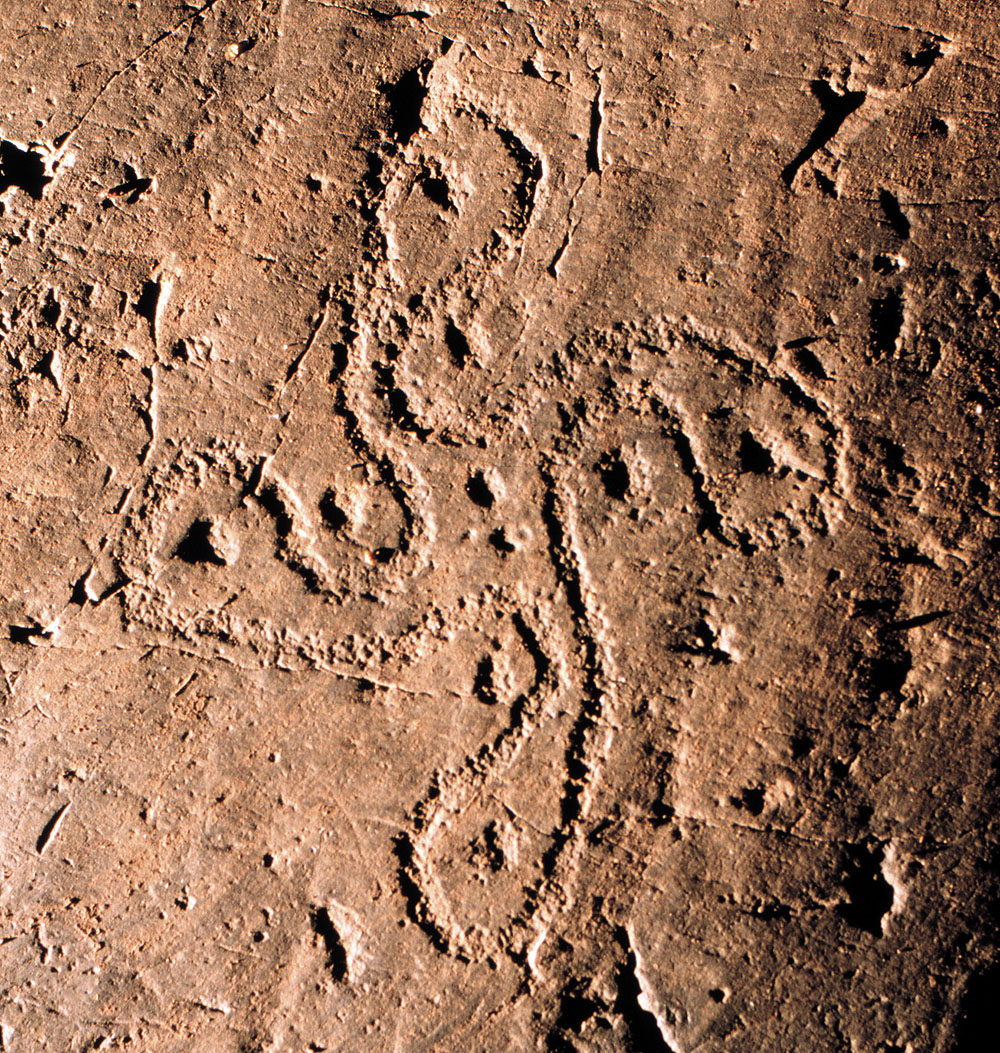
Camunian rose in the swastika shape on the rock 57 of Vite, Paspardo

The motif has been deeply studied by Paola Farina, who created a corpus of all the "Camunian roses" known in Val Camonica: she counted 84 "roses" engraved on 27 rocks. Three basic types have been determined:

1. swastika type: the 9 cup-marks make a 5 by 5 cross; the contour forms four arms that bend about 90° and every arm includes one of the top cup-marks of the cross. Sixteen “roses” of this type have been found;
2. asymmetric-swastika type: the disposition of the 9 cup-marks is the same as the previous; but the contour is different, because only two arms bend 90°, while the other ones join together in a single bilobate arm. There are 12 “roses” of this type;
3. quadrilobate type: the 9 cup-marks are aligned in three columns of three cups; the contour develops into four orthogonal and symmetric arms, and each one includes a cup-mark. It is the more widespread type of camunian rose; 56 examples exist.

Regarding the interpretation, not easy for a symbol pertaining to a lost and past culture, Paola Farina suggests that the "Camunian rose" had originally a solar meaning, which then developed into a wider meaning of a positive power, to bring life and good luck.

The name of the symbol, derived from its resemblance to a flower, is a modern invention. A stylized "Camunian rose" has become the symbol of the Lombardy region and is featured on its flag.

== See also ==
- Camunni
- Rock Drawings in Valcamonica
- Looped square
- Swastika Stone
- Lauburu
- Western use of the swastika in the early 20th century

== Bibliography ==
- Fradkin, Ariela; Anati, Emmanuel (2001). Valcamonica preistorica - Guida ai parchi acheologici. Capo di Ponte: Edizioni del Centro. ISBN 88-86621-16-7.
- Farina, Paola (1998). La “rosa camuna” nell’arte rupestre della Valcamonica, NAB, 6, pp. 185–205.
