= Ossimo =

Ossimo Òsem
- Comune
- Comune di Ossimo
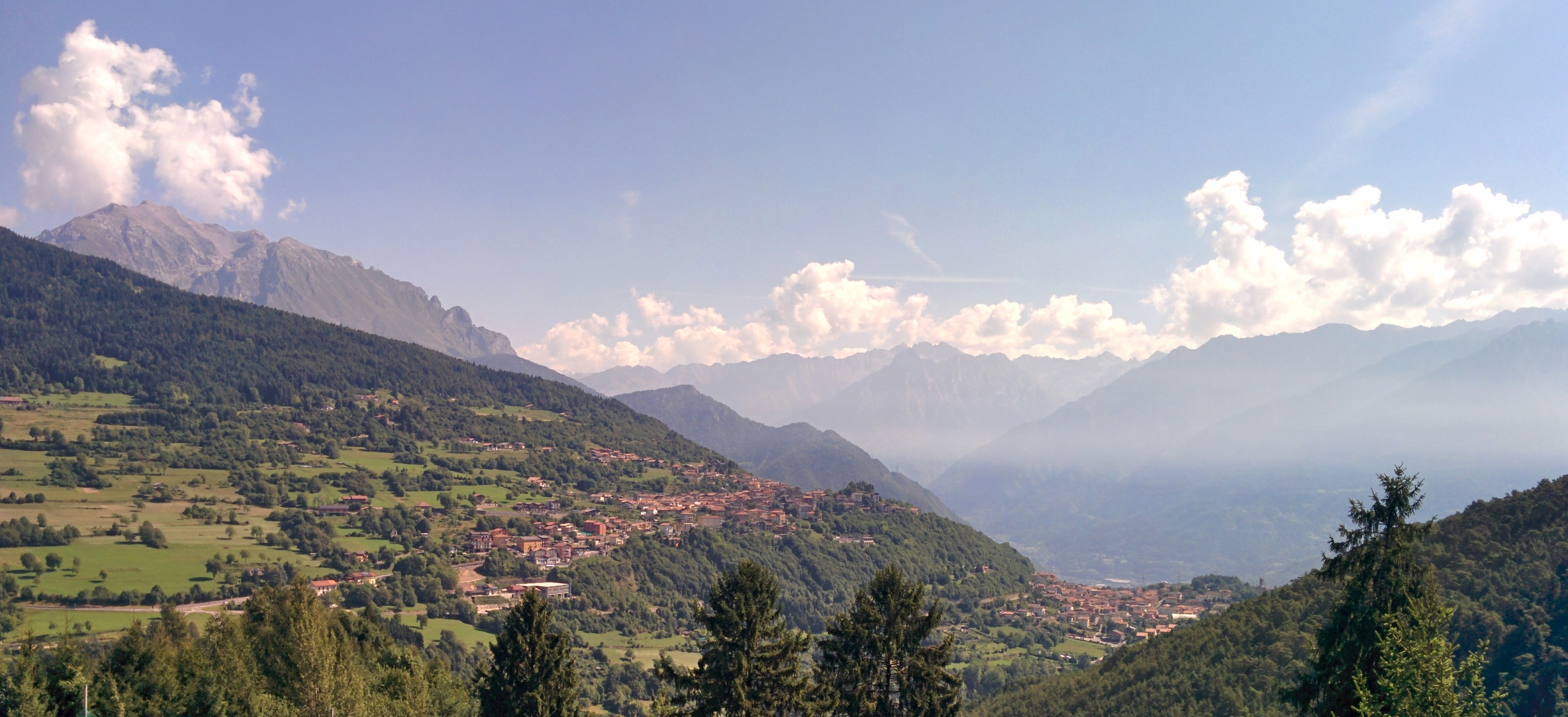
- Upper and Lower Ossimo.

- Coat of arms

- Location within Italy Location within Lombardy
- Coordinates: 45°56′49″N 10°13′53″E
- Country: Italy
- Region: Lombardy
- Province: Brescia (BS)
- Frazioni: Ossimo Superiore, Ossimo Inferiore

Government
  - Mayor: Cristian Farisé

Area
  - Total: 14 km^{2} (5.4 sq mi)
- Elevation: 869 m (2,851 ft)

Population (30 April 2017)
  - Total: 1,448
  - Density: 100/km^{2} (270/sq mi)
- Demonym: Ossimesi
- Time zone: UTC+1 (CET)
  - Summer (DST): UTC+2 (CEST)
- Postal code: 25050
- Dialing code: 0364
- Patron saint: Saint Cosmas and Damian (Ossimo Inferiore), Saints Gervasius and Protasius (Ossimo Superiore)
- Saint day: 27 September, 19 June
- Website: Official website

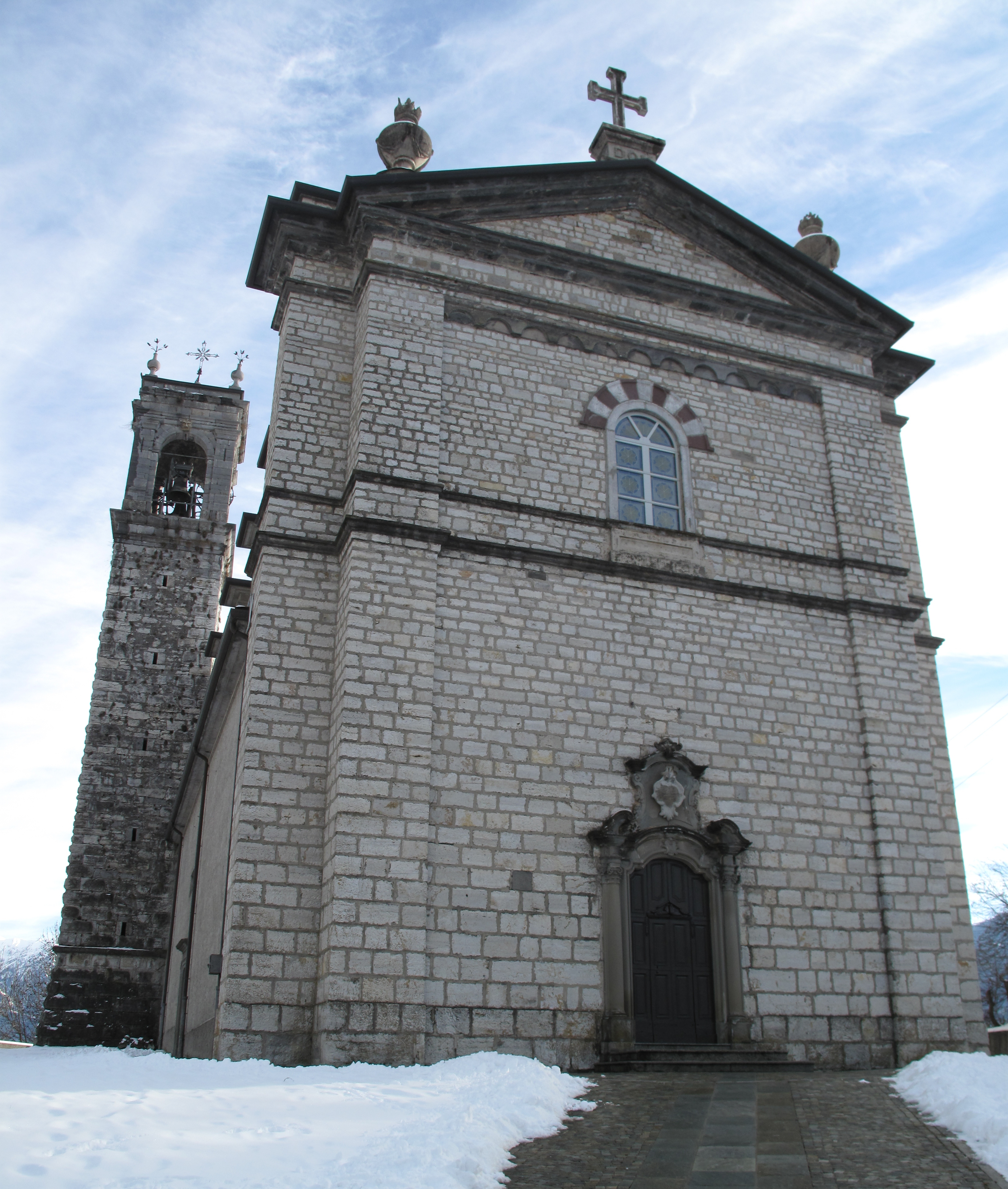
Parish church

Ossimo (Camunian: Òsem) is a town and comune in the province of Brescia, Lombardy, northern Italy. It is part of Val Camonica, and is divided into two centers: Ossimo Superiore and Ossimo Inferiore.

It can be reached by the provincial road 5, that leads from Malegno to Borno.
