= Capo di Ponte =

Capo di Ponte Co de Pút
- Comune
- Comune di Capo di Ponte
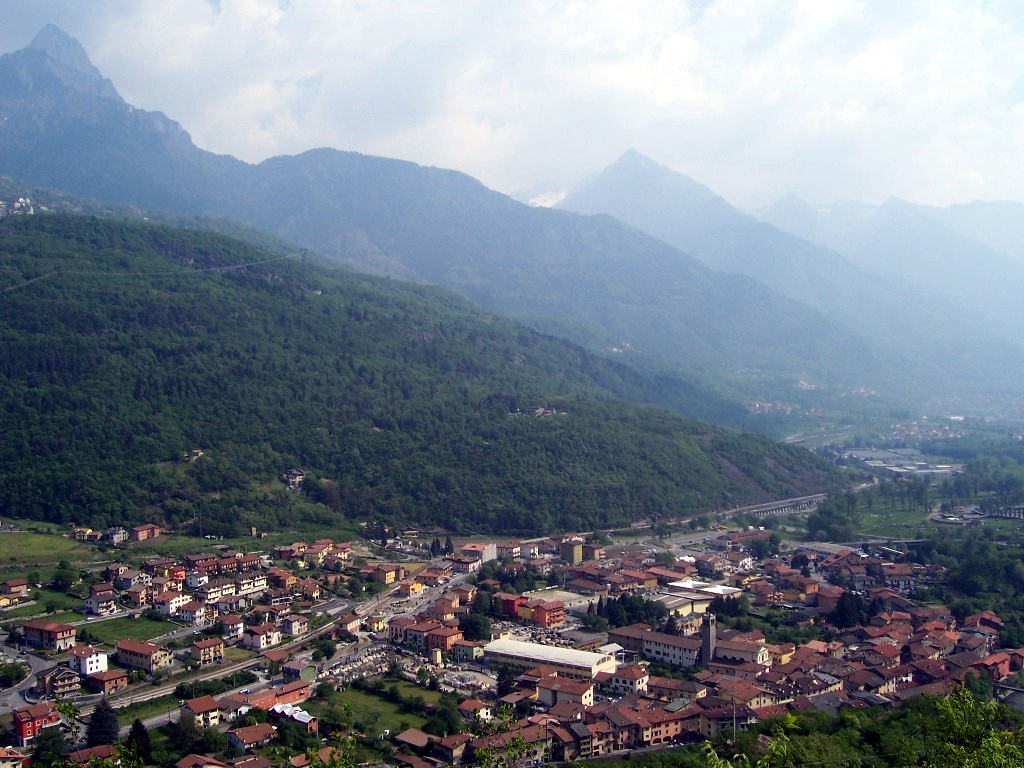

- Coat of arms

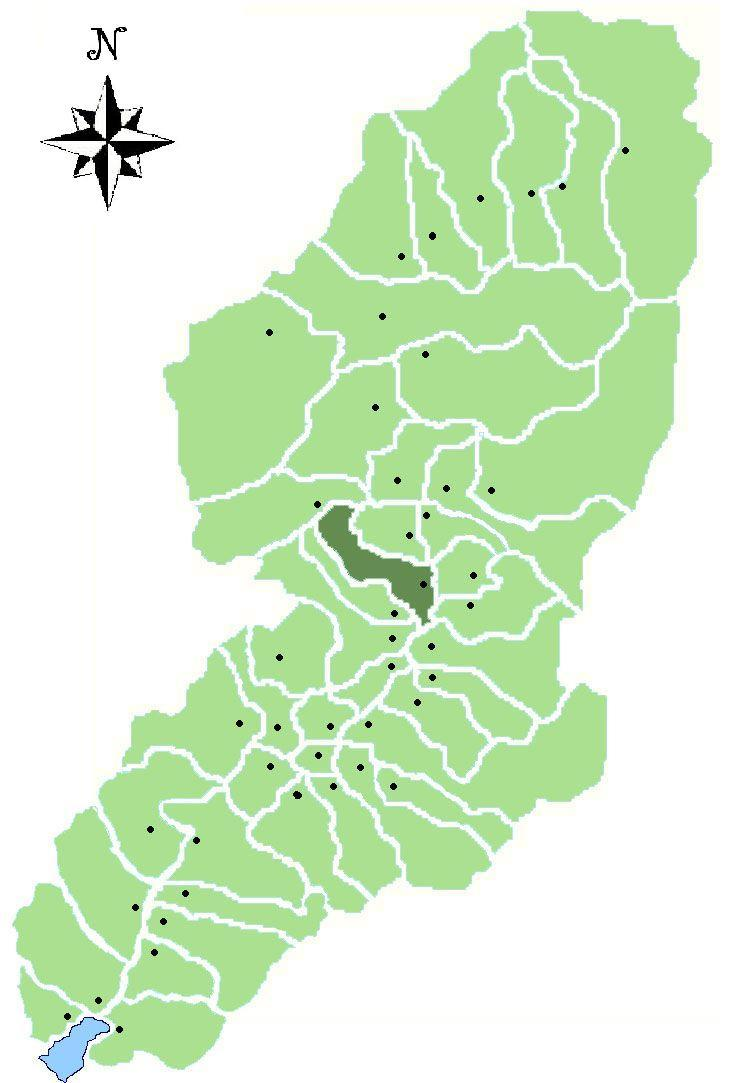
- Location of Capo di Ponte in Val Camonica.

- Location within Italy Location within Lombardy
- Coordinates: 46°01′54″N 10°20′48″E
- Country: Italy
- Region: Lombardy
- Province: Brescia (BS)

Government
  - Mayor: Andrea Ghetti

Area
  - Total: 18.11 km^{2} (6.99 sq mi)
- Elevation: 362 m (1,188 ft)

Population (30 November 2021)
  - Total: 2,316
  - Density: 127.9/km^{2} (331.2/sq mi)
- Demonym: Capontini
- Time zone: UTC+1 (CET)
  - Summer (DST): UTC+2 (CEST)
- Postal code: 25044
- Dialing code: 0364
- Patron saint: Saint Martin
- Saint day: 11 November
- Website: Official website

Capo di Ponte (Camunian: Co de Pút) is an Italian comune in Val Camonica, province of Brescia, in Lombardy.

Located 362 metres (1,188 ft) above sea level, Capo di Ponte (en. "Head of Bridge") owes its name to an ancient settlement to the west of a bridge over the River Oglio which leads to a hamlet named Cemmo. The present comune is on the eastern side of the river.

== History ==
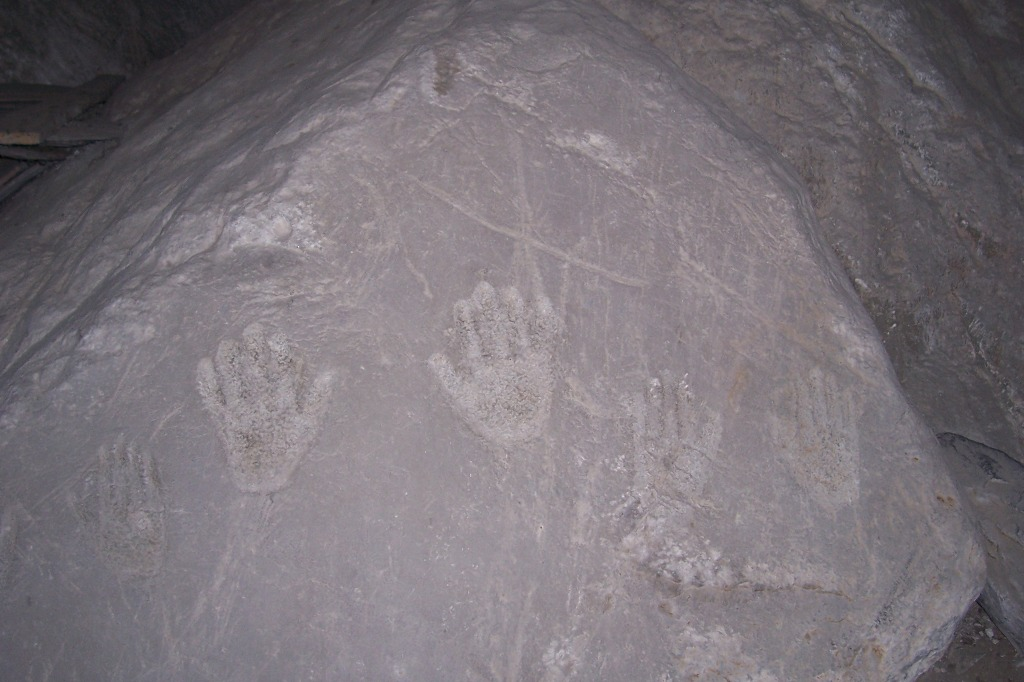
Hands of the St Faustina and Liberata

There are a number of rock art sites in this part of Val Camonica

Between the 11th and 14th centuries, Capo di Ponte was known as the hamlet of Cemmo—part of the priory of San Salvatore of Tezze.

In 1315 the Imesigo marsh, on the plain between Capo di Ponte and Sellero, was flooded by the River Re.

On 14 October 1336 the Bishop of Brescia, Jacopo de Atti, invested fiefs for a tenth of the rights in the territories of Incudine, Cortenedolo, Mù, Cemmo, Zero, Viviano and Capo di Ponte to Maffeo Giroldo Botelli of Nadro.

In 1698 Father Gregorio Brunelli says that the village of Zero (or Serio), which stood on banks of the River Re, east of the country today, was swept away by a flood.

After the fall of the Republic of Venice the "comune of Capo di Ponte" (1797–1798) was founded, later becoming "comune of Cemmo and Capo di Ponte" (1798 to 1815). Under the Lombardo-Veneto kingdom, the name was again changed to "comune di Capo di Ponte e Cemmo" (1816 to 1859). It has been known as Capo di Ponte since 1859.

== Main sights ==
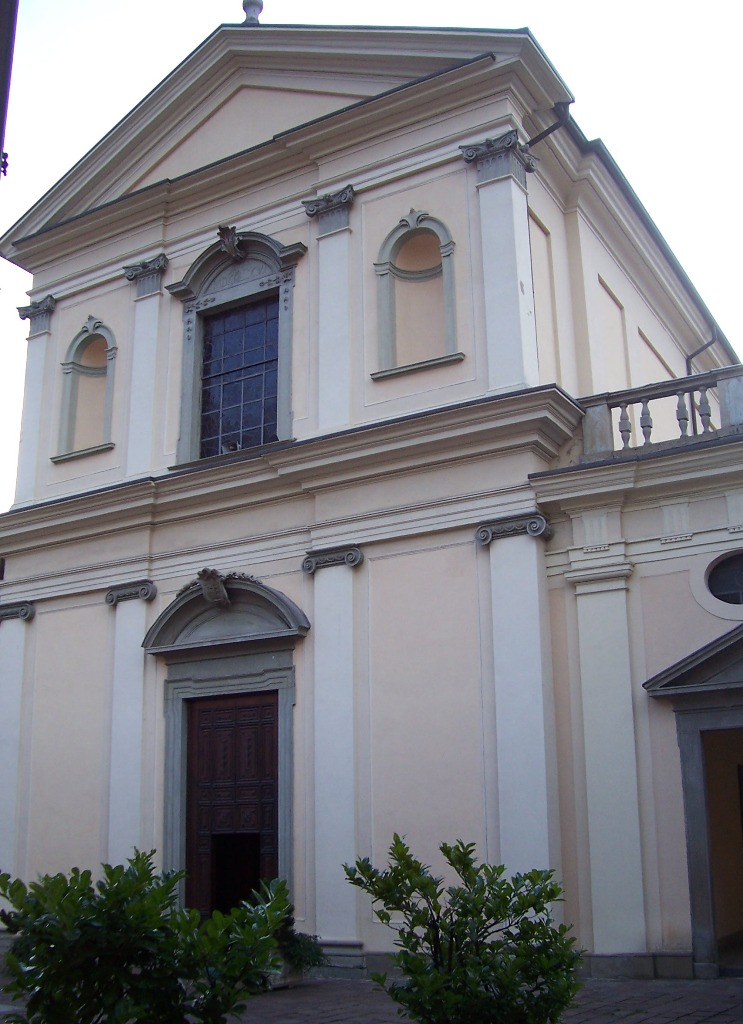
Parish church of St Martin

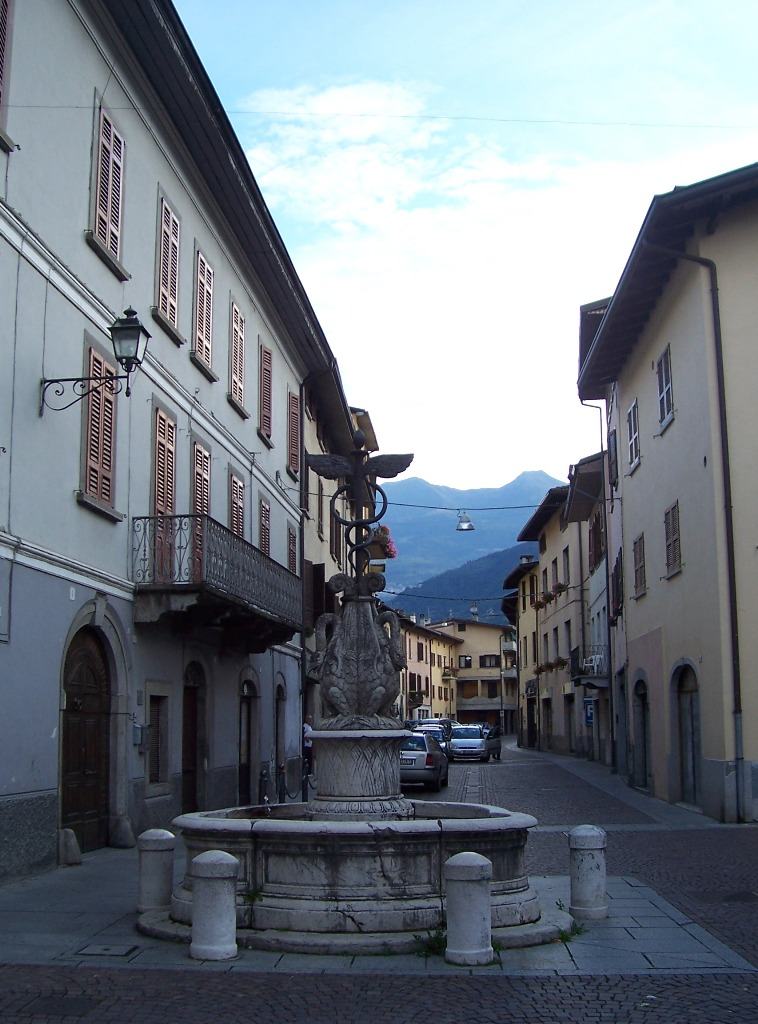
Town of Capo di Ponte

- Parish of Saint Martino, rebuilt in the eighteenth century with stone columns in Sarnico. The Soasa is by Beniamino Simoni.
- Monastery of San Salvatore of Tezze
- Church of Saint Faustina and Liberata
- Oratory of St Rocco at Bridge of the seventeenth century.
- Pieve of Saint Syrus (Cemmo)
- Rock drawings in Valcamonica
- National Park of Naquane (stone carvings)
- Municipal Archaeological Park of Seradina-Bedolina
- National Archeological Park of Massi di Cemmo
