= Paspardo =

Paspardo Pahpàrt
- Comune
- Comune di Paspardo
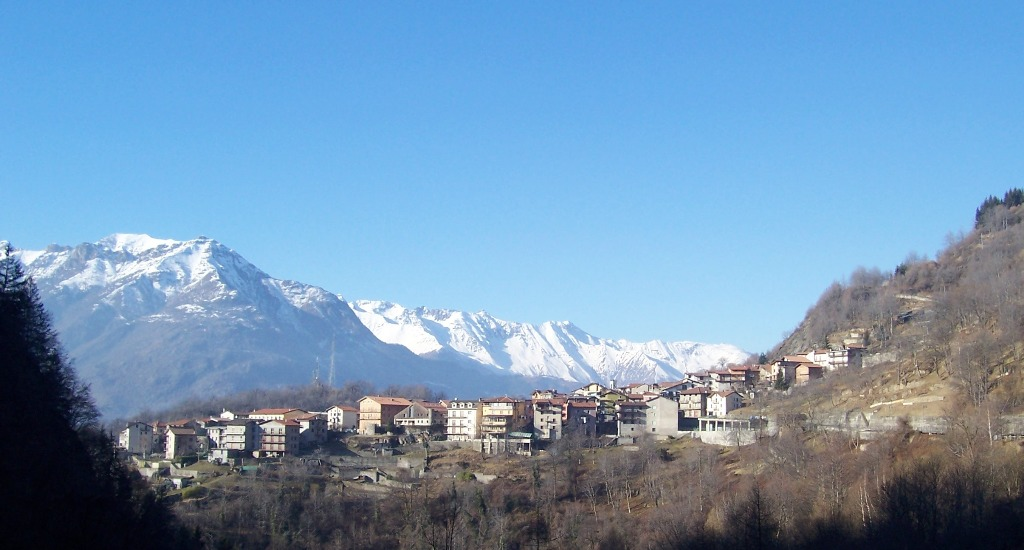
- Paspardo's panorama

- Location within Italy Location within Lombardy
- Coordinates: 46°01′54″N 10°22′19″E
- Country: Italy
- Region: Lombardy
- Province: Brescia (BS)

Area
  - Total: 10 km^{2} (3.9 sq mi)
- Elevation: 978 m (3,209 ft)

Population (2011)
  - Total: 650
  - Density: 65/km^{2} (170/sq mi)
- Demonym: Paspardesi
- Time zone: UTC+1 (CET)
  - Summer (DST): UTC+2 (CEST)
- Postal code: 25050
- Dialing code: 0364
- Patron saint: San Gaudenzio
- Saint day: 16 August
- Website: Official website

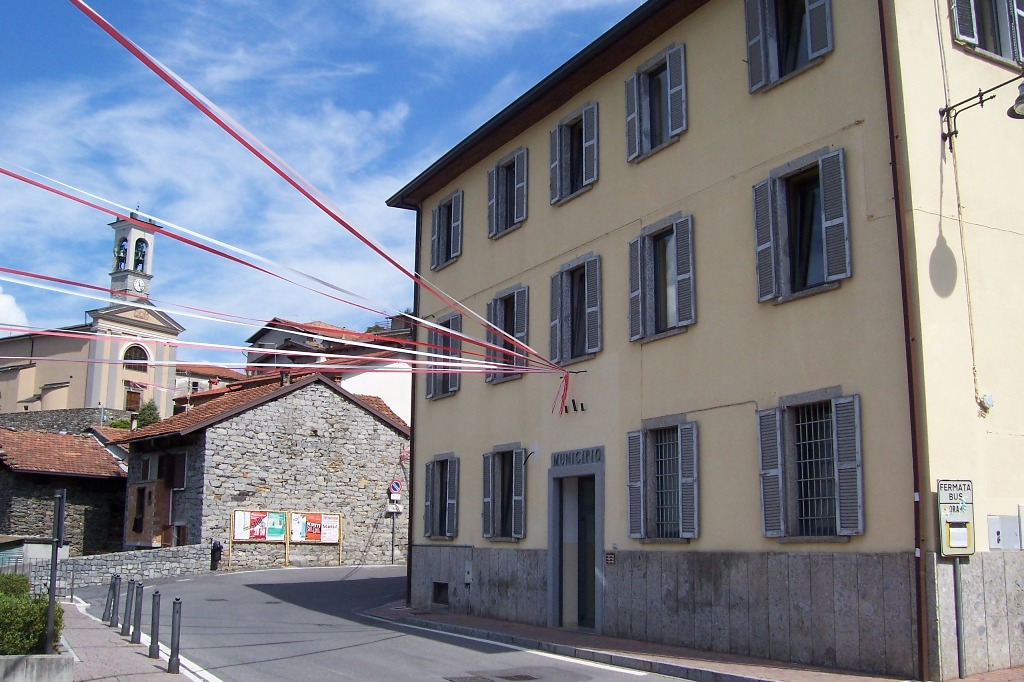
the Town Hall

Paspardo (Camunian: Pahpàrt) is a comune in the province of Brescia, in Lombardy. It is situated in Val Camonica. Neighbouring communes are Capo di Ponte, Cedegolo and Cimbergo.

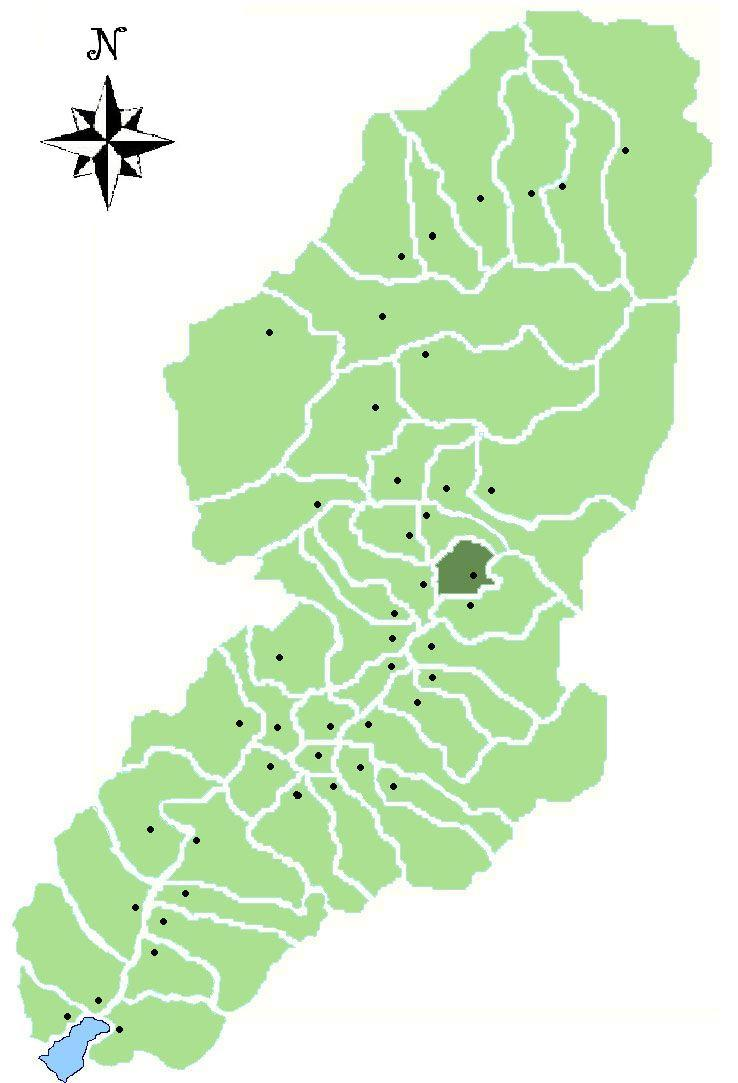
Location of Paspardo in Val Camonica
