= Giarelli =

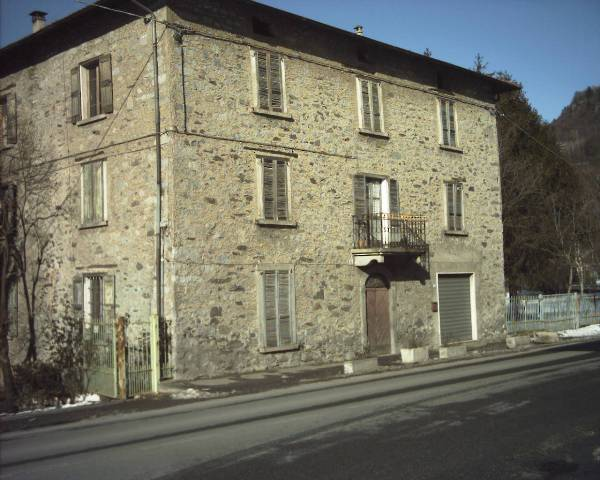
Giarelli's house in Nadro

Giarelli is an Italian surname.

A long presence of the Giarelli family is attested in Valle Camonica, Lombardy. The Giarelli surname was listed among the originari - the ancientest families of a community during the period of the Republic of Venice - in Cimbergo.

The surname is also documented in Bozzolo, Ceto, Massa Carrara, Piacenza, France, Honduras, Argentina, Brazil and the United States.

In some cases the surname has assumed the mutation in Gerelli or Girelli. In dialectal form the surname is Giaréi.

In Ceto is documented the Giarelli locality.

== People ==
- Francesco Giarelli (1844-1907)
- James Giarelli (1950-)
