= Ceto, Lombardy =

Ceto Hét
- Comune
- Comune di Ceto
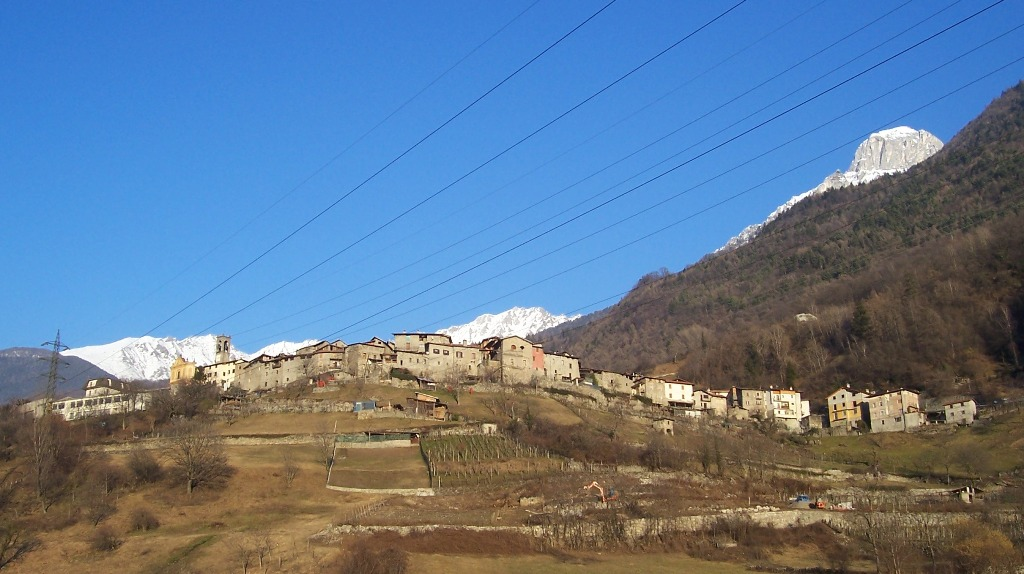
- Ceto's panorama

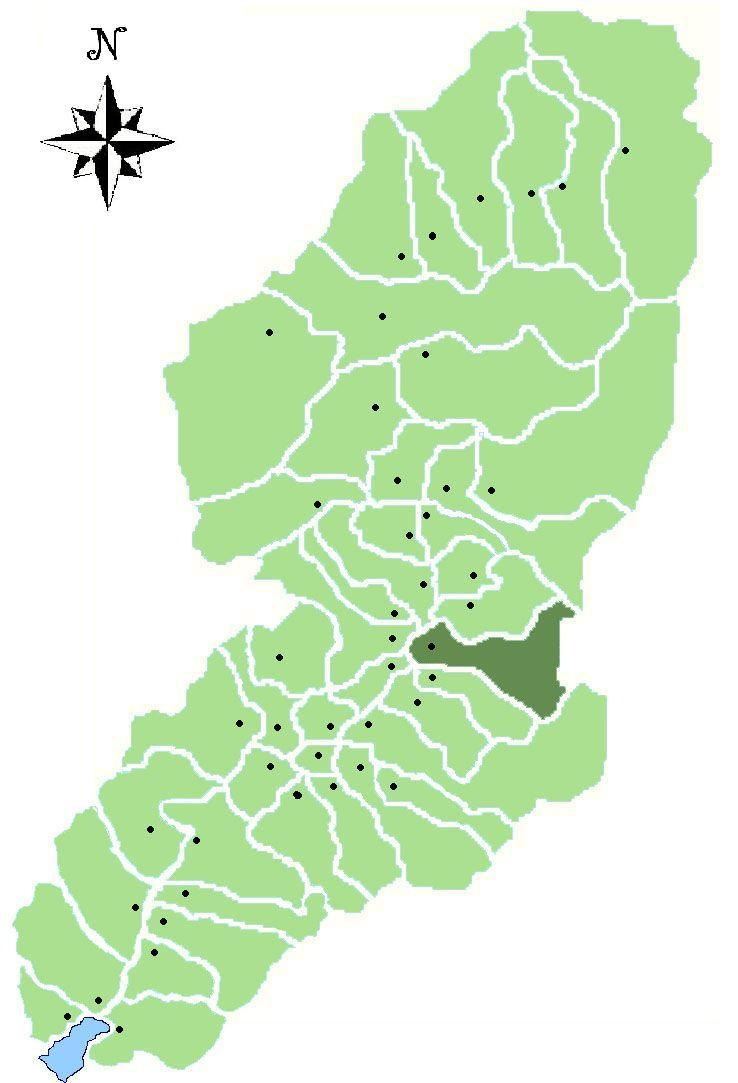
- Comune of Ceto in Val Camonica

- Location within Italy Location within Lombardy
- Coordinates: 46°0′12″N 10°21′10″E
- Country: Italy
- Region: Lombardy
- Province: Province of Brescia (BS)
- Frazioni: Badetto, Nadro

Government
  - Mayor: Marina Lanzetti

Area
  - Total: 32.3 km^{2} (12.5 sq mi)
- Elevation: 453 m (1,486 ft)

Population (30 May 2017)
  - Total: 1,900
  - Density: 59/km^{2} (150/sq mi)
- Demonym: Cetesi
- Time zone: UTC+1 (CET)
  - Summer (DST): UTC+2 (CEST)
- Postal code: 25040
- Dialing code: 0364
- Patron saint: Sant'Andrea Apostolo
- Saint day: 30 November
- Website: Official website

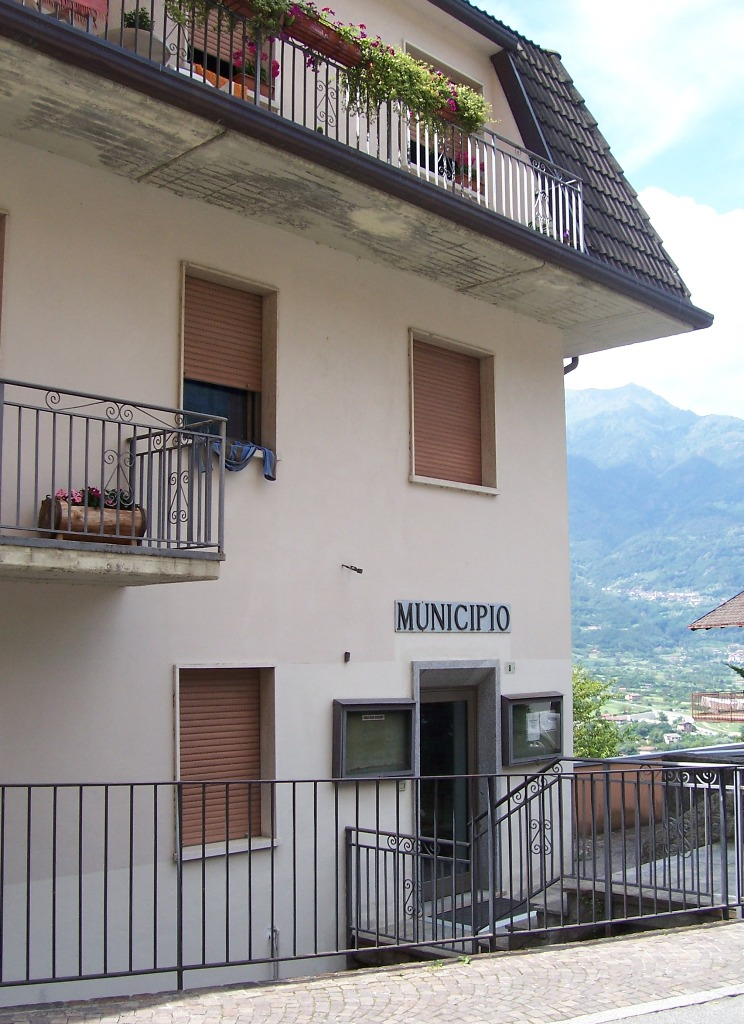
The Town Hall

Ceto (Camunian: Hét) is an Italian comune in Val Camonica, province of Brescia, in Lombardy.

The village of Ceto is bounded by other communes of Braone, Breno, Capo di Ponte, Cerveno, Cevo, Cimbergo, Daone (TN), Ono San Pietro.

== History ==
In February 1798 the town of Nadro was united to that of Ceto, and assumed the name of "comune of Ceto and Nadro. "

Between 1816 and 1859 the town was called "Ceto with Nadro", while from 1859 to 1927 only "Ceto". In that year he was joined Cerveno, which was linked with the name "Ceto Cerveno" until 1947.

== Main sights ==
- Church of St. Andrew the Apostle. Rebuilt on a previous building in 1700 from a design by Anthonio Spiazzi.
- Church of Saints Faustino and Jovita.
