= Lake Pantano d'Avio =

Artificial lake in Lombardy, Italy

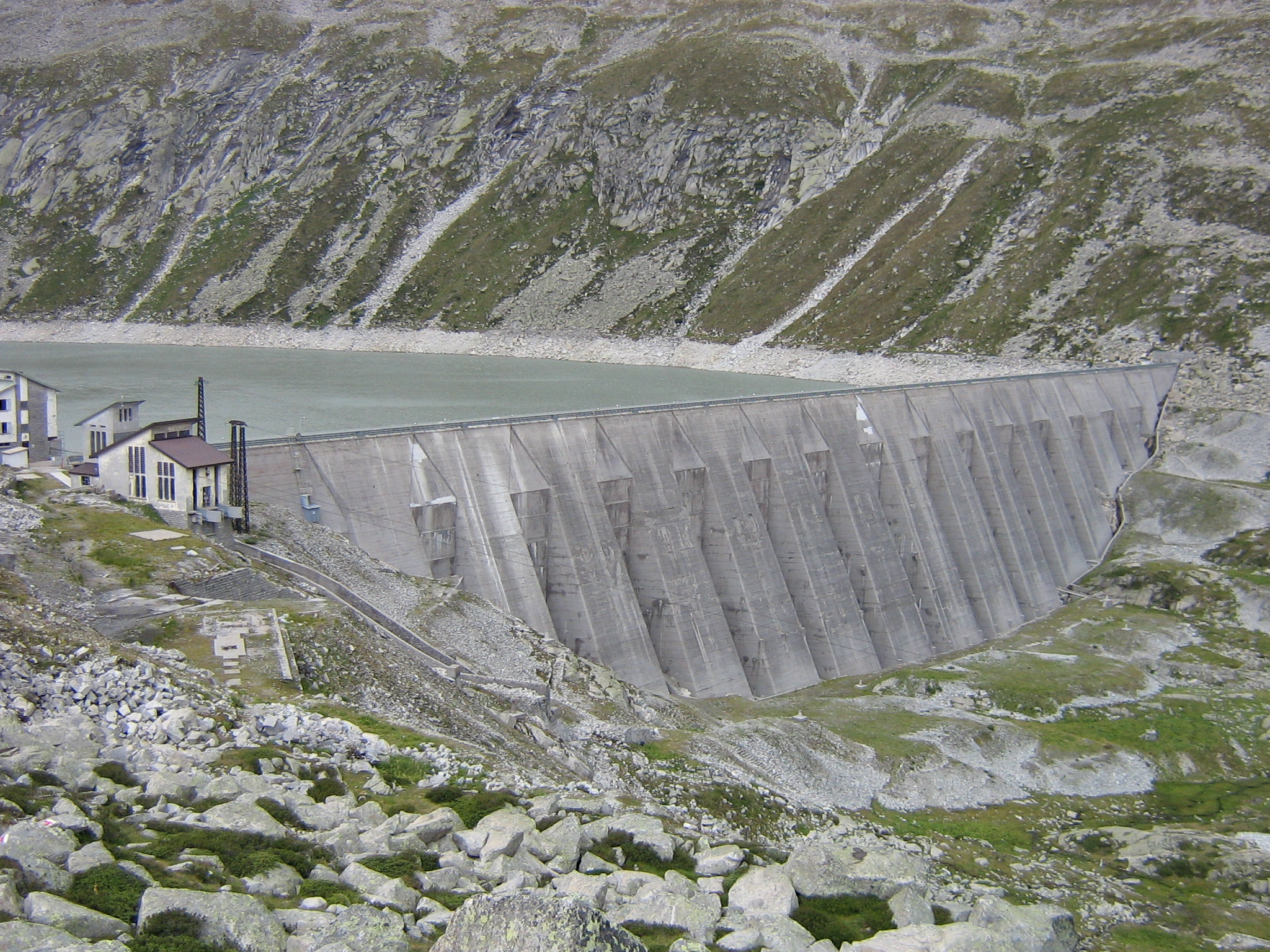

- Location of Lake Pantano d'Avio Lake Pantano d'Avio (Italy)
- Location: Edolo, Province of Brescia, Lombardy, Italy
- Coordinates: 46.1650°N 10.4719°E
- Type: Artificial
- Primary inflows: None
- Primary outflows: Coleasca Stream
- Basin countries: Italy
- Surface area: 0.42 km^{2} (0.16 sq mi)
- Average depth: 30 m (98 ft)
- Water volume: 0.128 km^{3} (0.031 cu mi)
- Surface elevation: 2,378 m (7,802 ft)

The Lake Pantano d'Avio (or more briefly, Lake Pantano) is an artificial lake located in the upper Val d'Avio, a lateral valley of the Val Camonica, in the Province of Brescia.

Situated at 2,378 meters above sea level, it is the second largest lake in Val Camonica by surface area, after Lake d'Arno.

== Description ==
Built for hydroelectric purposes, it is supported by a concrete gravity-lightened (or buttress) dam, constructed in 1956. The dam is 59 meters high, 400 meters long at the crest, and has a volume of 200,000 cubic meters. The dam, due to its size, is the second highest in the Brescia mountains, surpassed by the Ponte Cola dam (Gargnano) at 122 meters.

Lake Pantano is part of a significant hydroelectric system that powers the power plant in Edolo, operational since 1984 (previously, the waters of the valley's lakes drove the turbines of the old Temù power plant, now decommissioned). This system comprises Lake Pantano and Lake Venerocolo, the two reservoirs at the highest elevation, and the two lakes in the mid-valley (Lake d'Avio and Lake Benedetto). However, the waters of the two highest lakes also feed a small power plant located on the shores of Lake Benedetto.

== Access ==
Attached to the dam, which is always staffed, are the caretaker's residence and some service facilities (control cabins), including the station for the cableway that arrives from Dosso Lavedole, above the southern end of Lake Benedetto. This facility, owned by Enel, is not open to the public

The dam and the lake are thus reachable only on foot. The most direct trail leading to it branches off from the former route number 11 of the CAI sections of Val Camonica (now part of route number 1, Alta Via dell'Adamello) near Malga Lavedole, and by following it, one reaches the base of the dam in about one hour of walking. Alternatively, it is possible to reach the opposite end of the dam starting from the Rifugio Giuseppe Garibaldi and, by following a section of the Alta Via dell'Adamello, arrive at the lake in forty-five minutes. However, this route includes a challenging section, the ascent and descent of the Bocchetta del Pantano or Passo del Lunedì (2,650 m), making it suitable only for experienced hikers.
