= Nadro =

- Hamlet
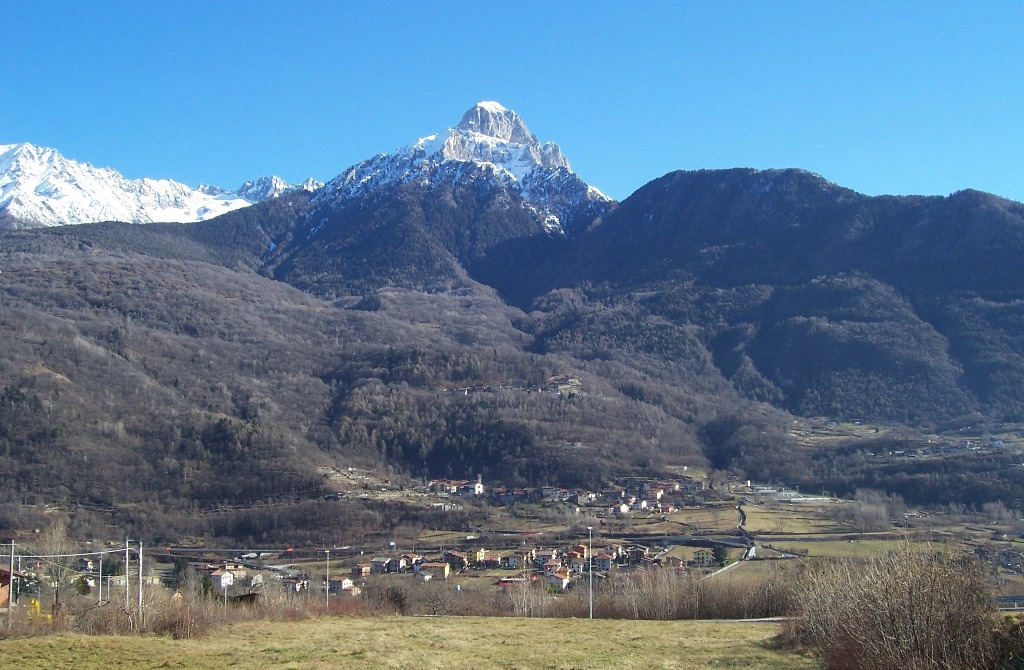
- Nadro' panorama
- Interactive map of Nadro
- Coordinates: 46°0′46″N 10°21′10″E

Nadro (Nàder in camunian dialect) is an Italian hamlet (frazione) of the comune of Ceto (BS), Lombardy. It has 655 inhabitants.

It lies 75 km from Brescia, along the strada Statale 42 del Tonale e della Mendola and is situated in Val Camonica.

Nadro is a medieval town developed around the tower house of the noble Gaioni's family, dating to the 15th century. It represents the main access to the riserva naturale Incisioni rupestri di Ceto, Cimbergo e Paspardo, a large area with numerous petroghlyphs; the "didactical museum of the reserve" (Museo didattico della riserva) is there.

== Gallery ==
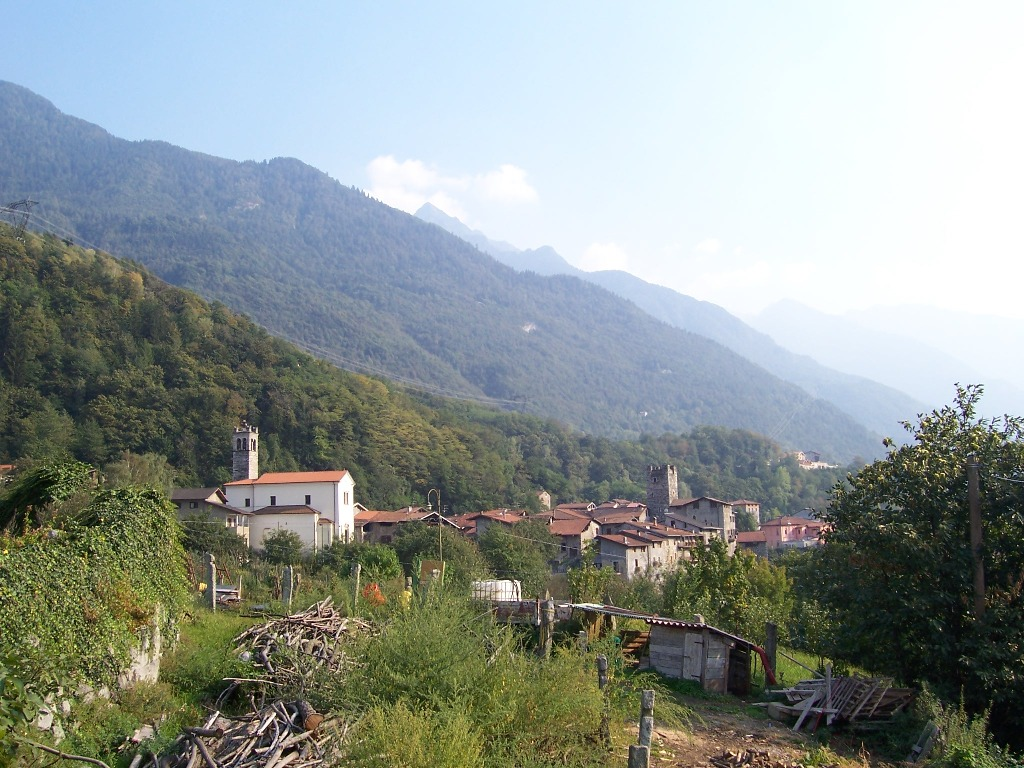
Nadro from north

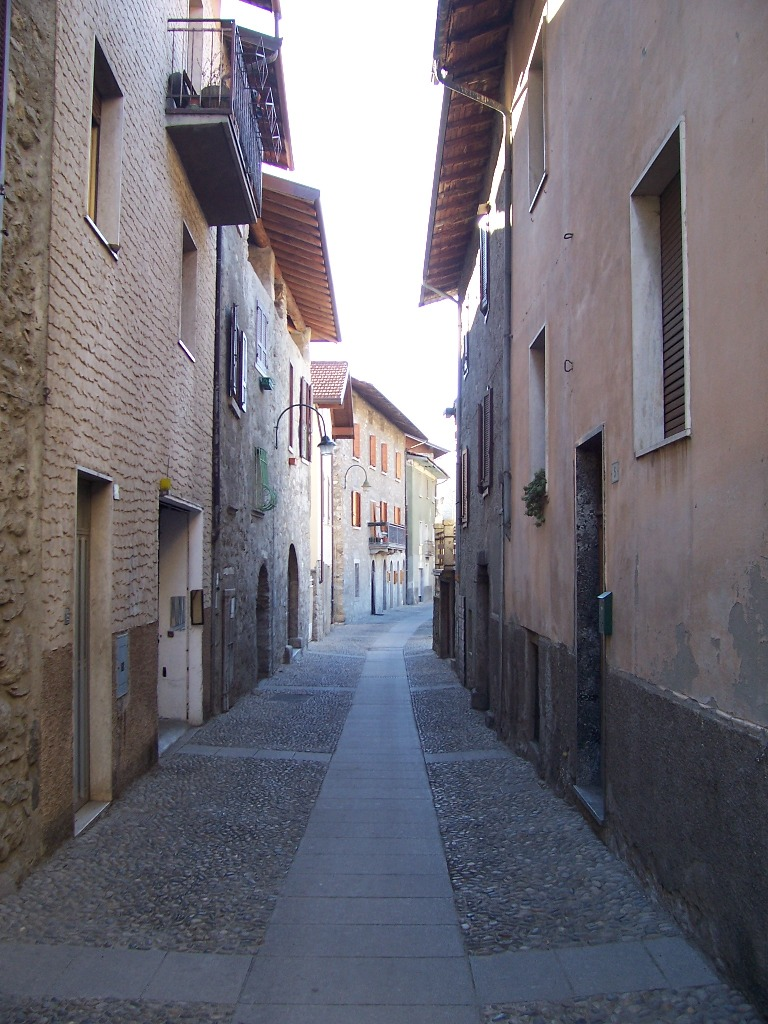
"Via Piana", main street in Nadro

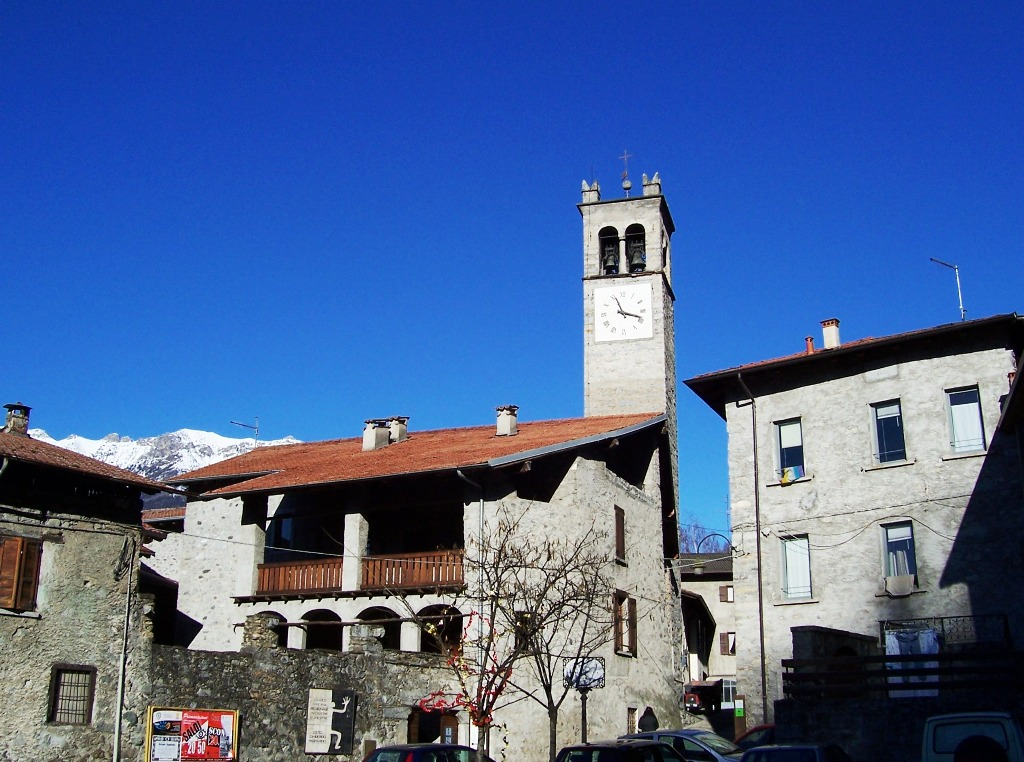
Museo didattico della riserva

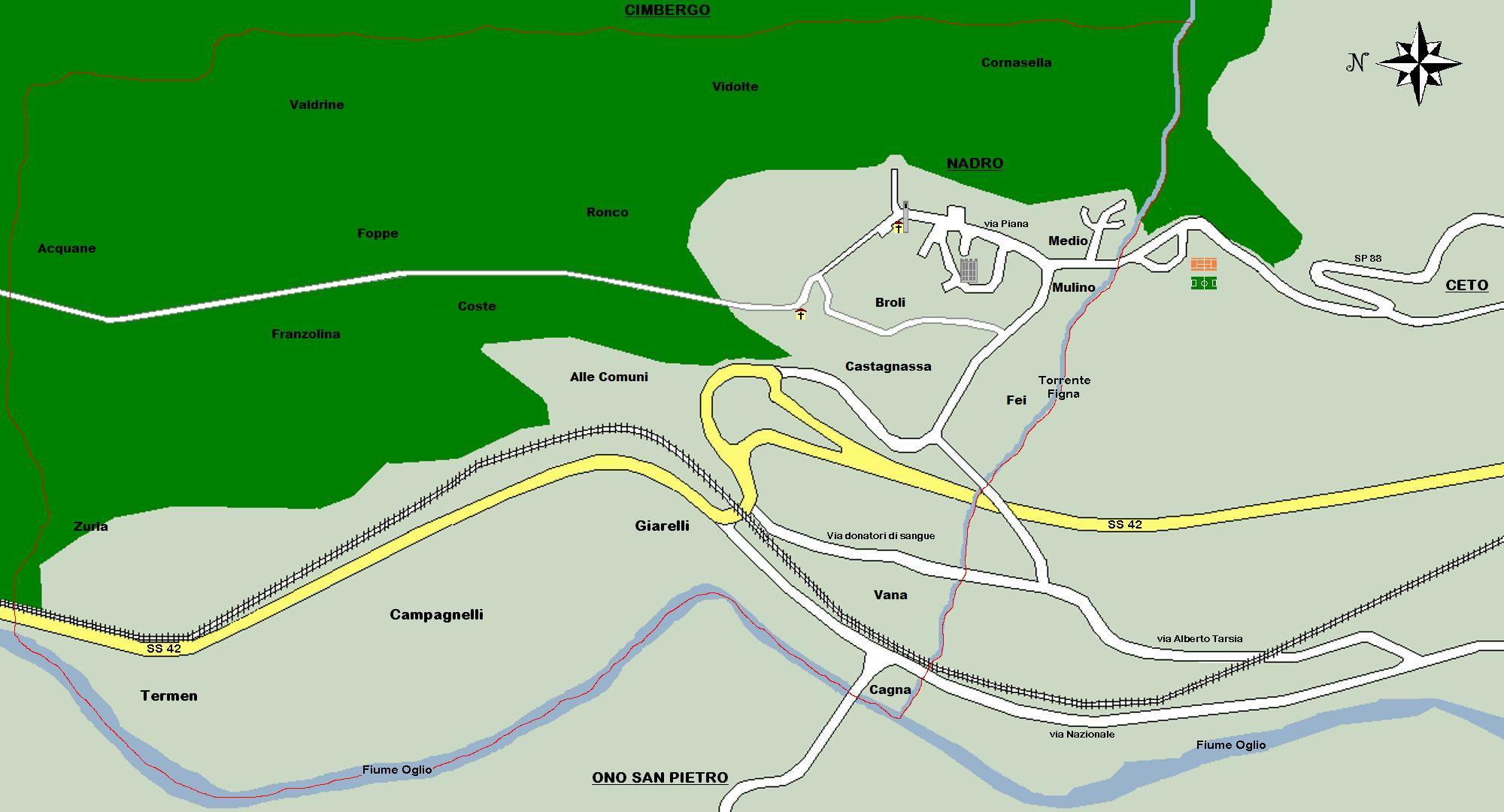
Nadro's land

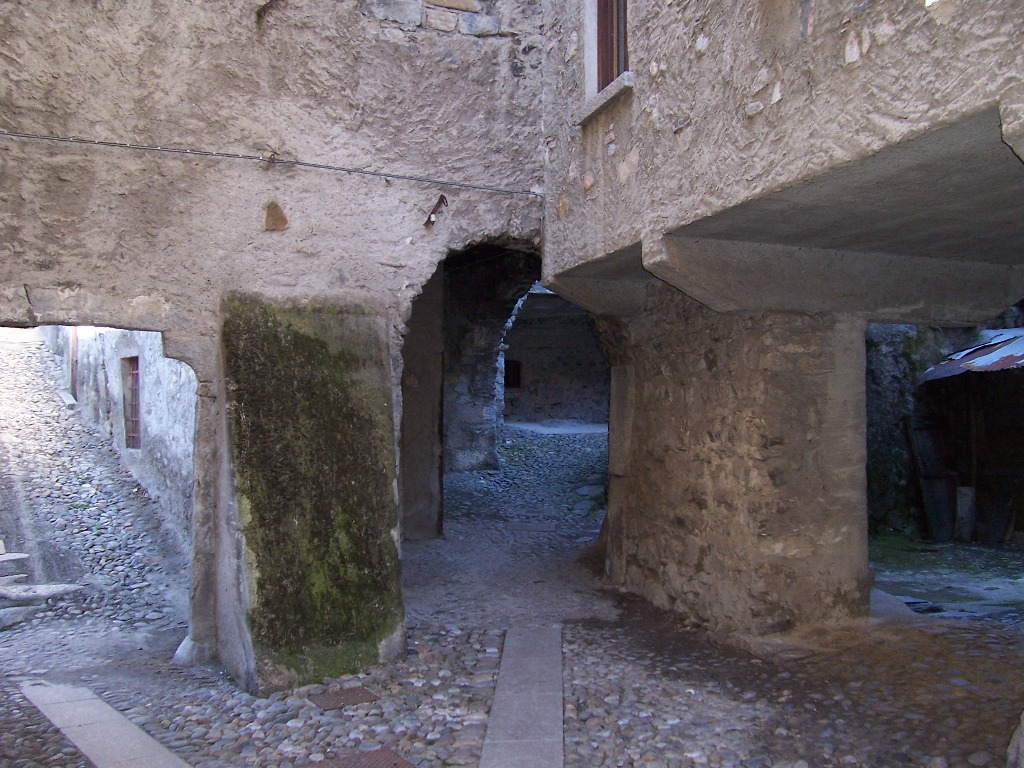
Ancient buildings in Nadro

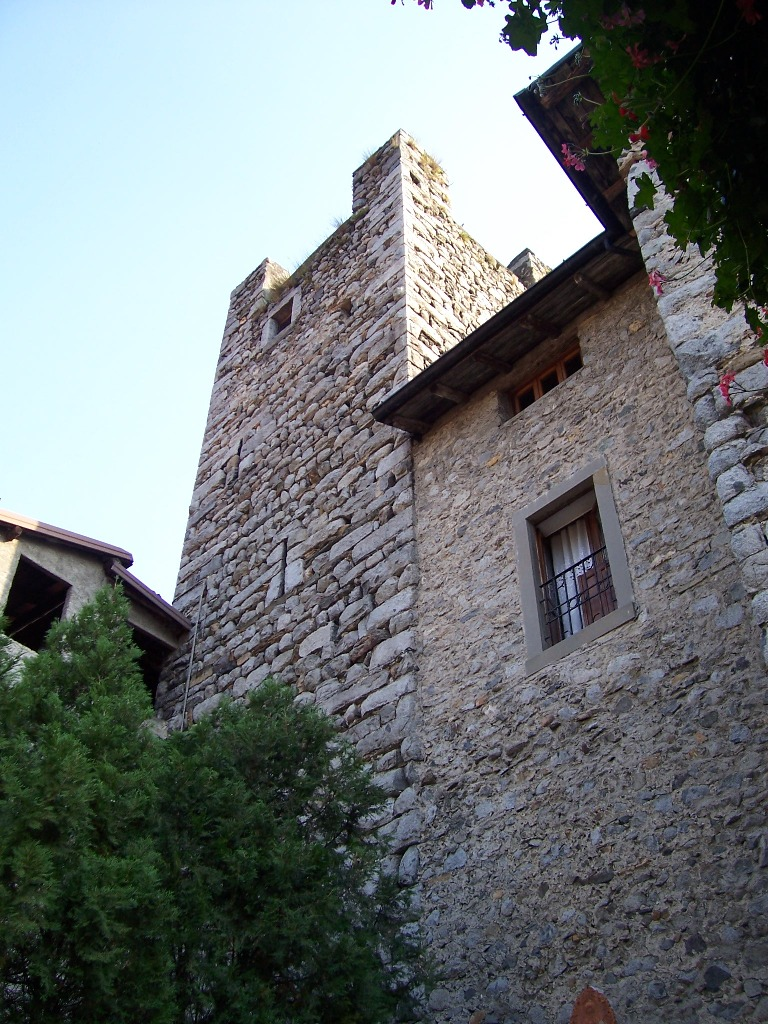
House-tower of Nadro

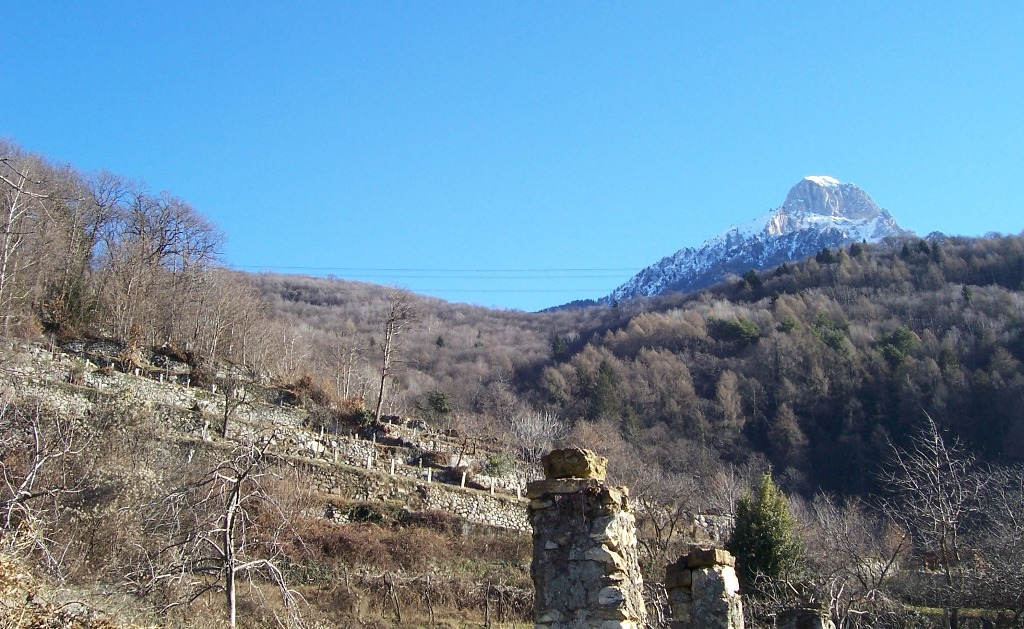
Terracement (stone-wall) or "ruk" in camunian dialect

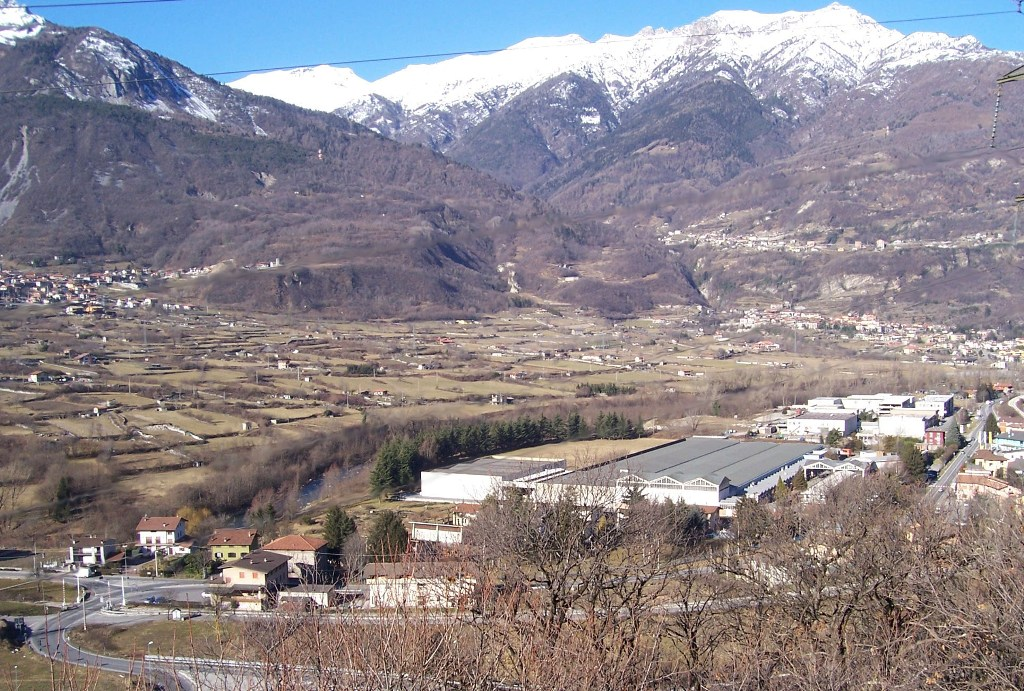
Loc. Giarelli and industrial area of Nadro
