= Lake Benedetto =

Artificial lake in Val d'Avio, Province of Brescia, Italy

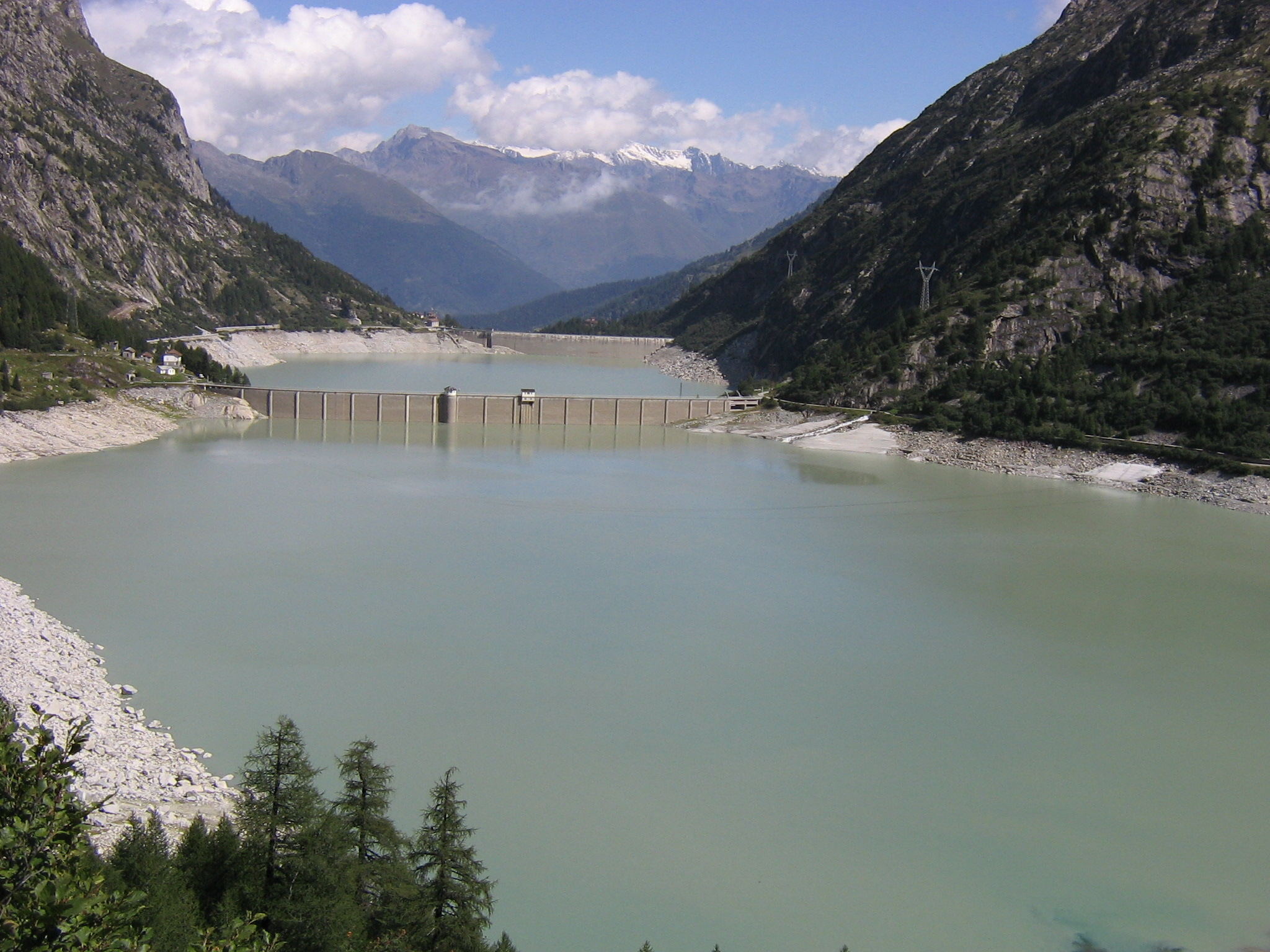

- Location within Italy
- Location: Italy
- Coordinates: 46°11′10″N 10°28′12″E
- Type: Artificial
- Primary inflows: Avio
- Primary outflows: Avio
- Basin countries: Italy

Lake Benedetto is an artificial lake located at 1,929 meters above sea level in Valle dell'Avio, a tributary of Val Camonica in the Province of Brescia.

== History ==
The Valle dell'Avio is characterized by numerous lakes. Two of these, Laghetto d'Avio and Lake d'Avio, are of natural origin but were expanded in the early post-war period for hydroelectric purposes through the construction of dams. The other three lakes, including Lake Benedetto, were created in the following decades to enhance the water reserve available for the power plant.

The dam supporting Lake Benedetto, named after engineer Fernando Benedetto, one of the project directors, was built between 1935 and 1940 immediately upstream of Lago d'Avio. This submerged a grassy plateau that contained the remnants of an ancient glacial lake, previously described by Douglas William Freshfield in his work Italian Alps, dated 1875.

The system thus created, further enhanced in the post-war period with the construction of the dams of Lake Pantano and Lake Venerocolo, powered the hydroelectric power plant in Temù, thanks to an elevation drop of over 800 meters. Today, this power plant is no longer active, and the waters of Val d'Avio feed the power plant in Edolo.

== Description ==
The gravity dam supporting the lake is made of concrete, stands 31 meters high, and is 322 meters long at the crest.

The lake formed by the dam is 795 meters long, 580 meters wide, and up to 46 meters deep; it has a full capacity of 6,960,000 cubic meters (7,710,000 cubic meters according to other sources). The color of its waters is often grayish and milky due to the high presence of fine rock fragments (silt) suspended in the water.

== Access ==
Access to the lake and the dam is only possible on foot, despite the existence of a cableway serving the facilities owned by Enel, which does not provide passenger transport.

The route, marked by trail marker number 11 of the CAI sections of Val Camonica, begins in Temù. Up to the Malga Caldea locality (1,584 m), it follows a forest road with a very uneven surface but open to traffic. Near the malga, there is a parking area, from which the path ascends through tight switchbacks on the rocky step separating the lower valley from the middle valley, reaching the "palazzina," a group of service buildings for the hydroelectric facilities, located at 1,904 m. From there, the path skirts slightly above the shores of Laghetto d'Avio and Lago d'Avio, arriving at the dam of Lake Benedetto, approximately one hour’s walk from Malga Caldea (two hours from Temù).

== See also ==
- Val Camonica
- Brescia

== Bibliography ==
- "Technical data on the dam and reservoir" (in Italian). Archived from the original on 25 December 2008.
- "LIMNO Database Entry for Lake Benedetto" (in Italian). Archived from the original on 4 November 2019.
