= Val Camonica =

Valley in the central Alps in Italy

- Al Camònega; Valcamonica; Valle Camonica; Camonica Valley
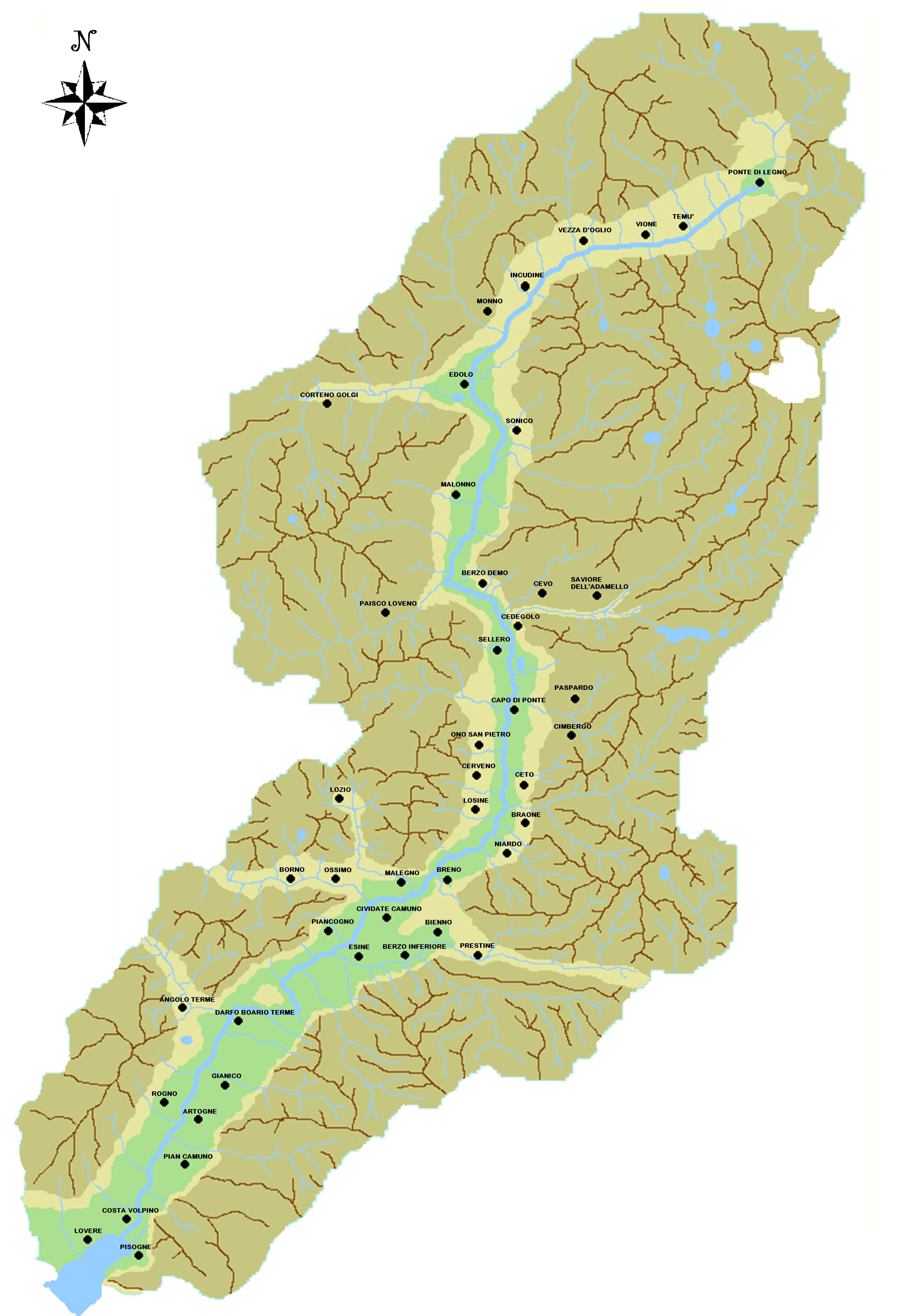

- Location within Alps Location within Lombardy Location within Italy
- Floor elevation: 1,883 m (6,178 ft)
- Area: 1,335 km^{2} (515 mi^{2})

Naming
- Native name: Al Camònega (Lombard)

Geography
- Coordinates: 46°00′27″N 10°20′51″E
- Rivers: River Oglio
- Interactive map of Val Camonica

Valle Camonica - Alto Sebino Biosphere Reserve
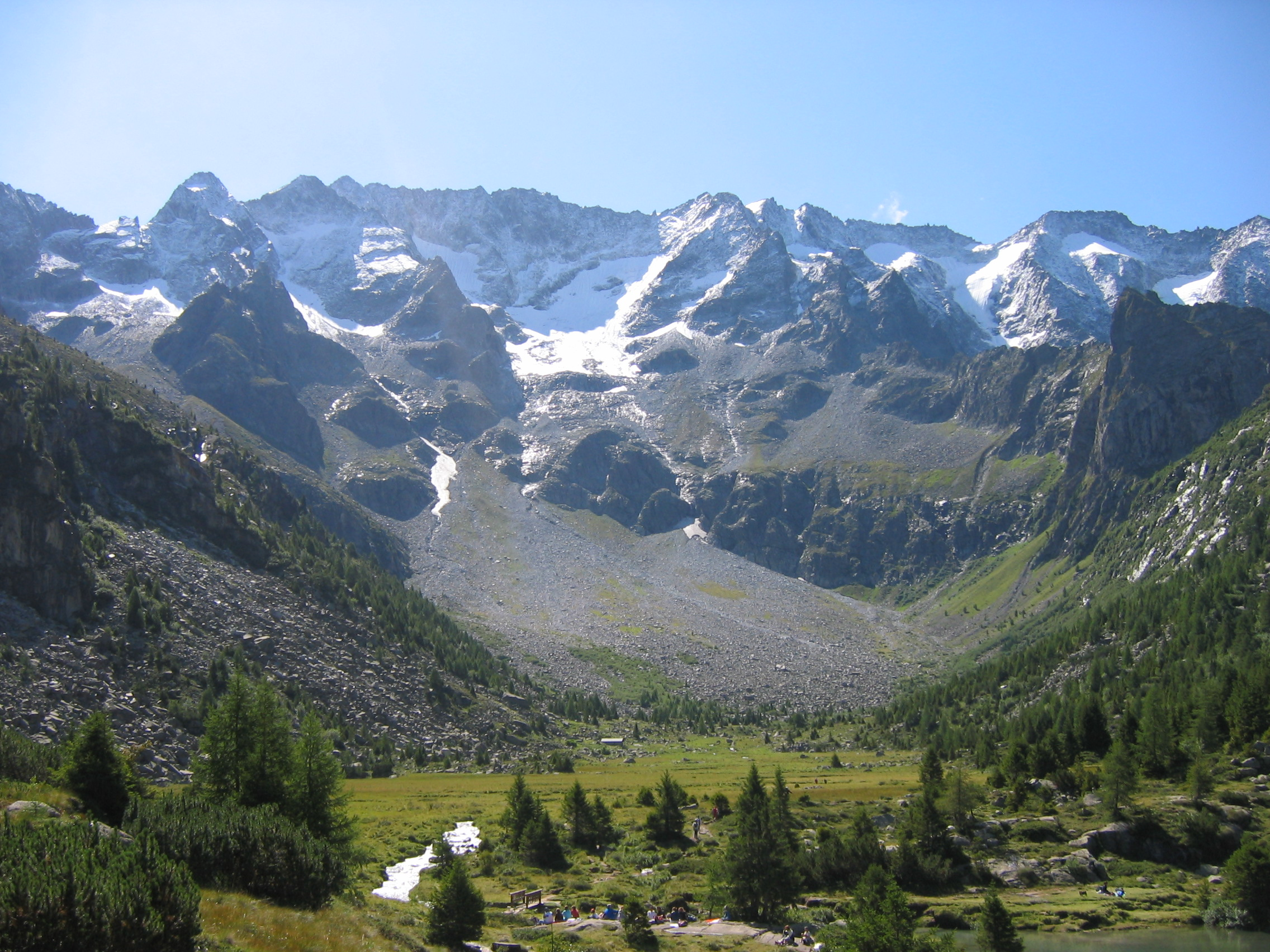
- Paghera Valley and Baitone Mountains
- Interactive map of Valle Camonica - Alto Sebino Biosphere Reserve
- Location: Lombardy, Italy
- Nearest city: Brescia
- Area: 1,355.65 square kilometres (523.42 sq mi)
- Established: 2018
- Governing body: Mountain community of Val Camonica (Comunità montana di Valle Camonica)
- Website: www.cmvallecamonica.bs.it

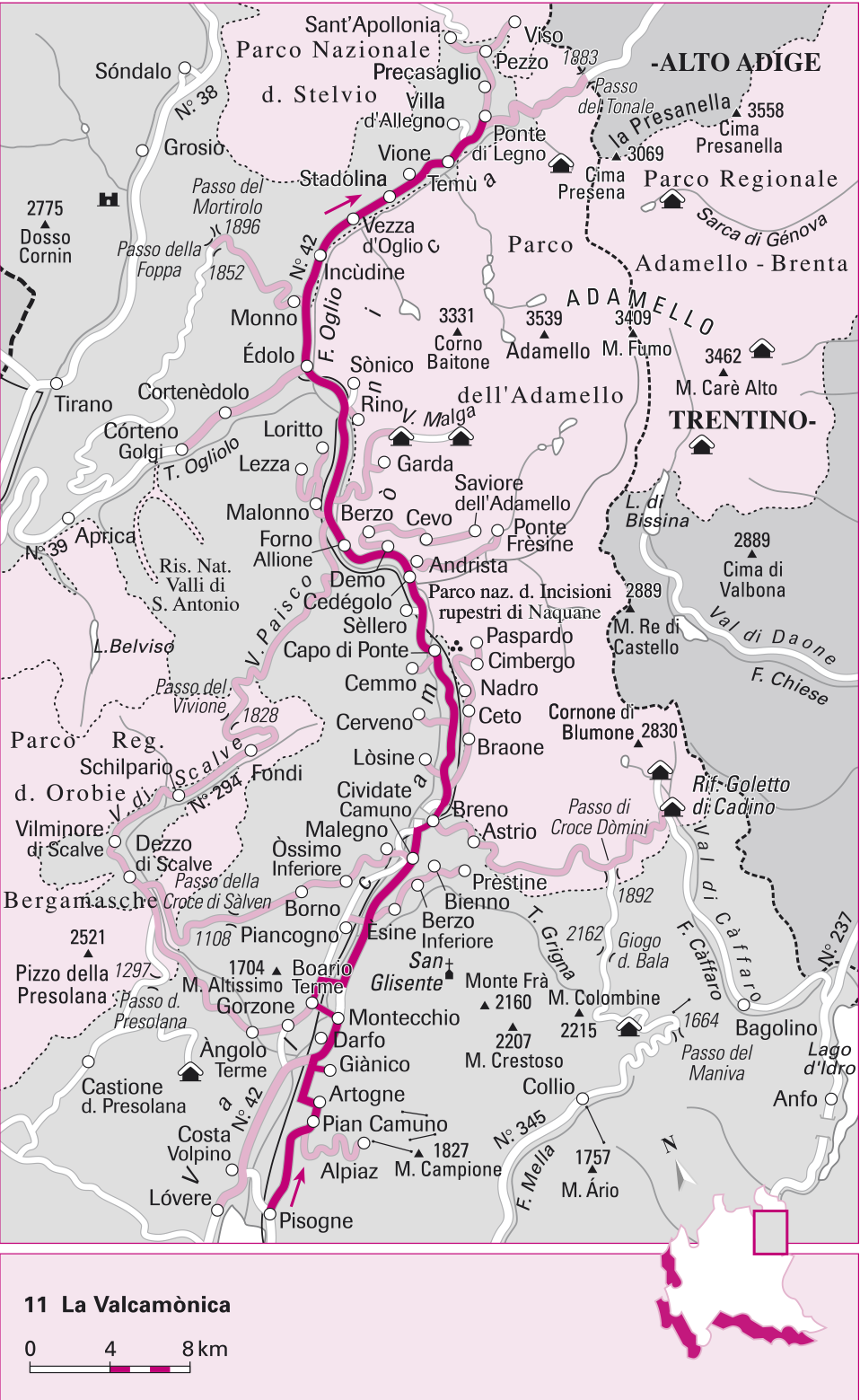
Detalied map and position of Val Camonica in Lombardy

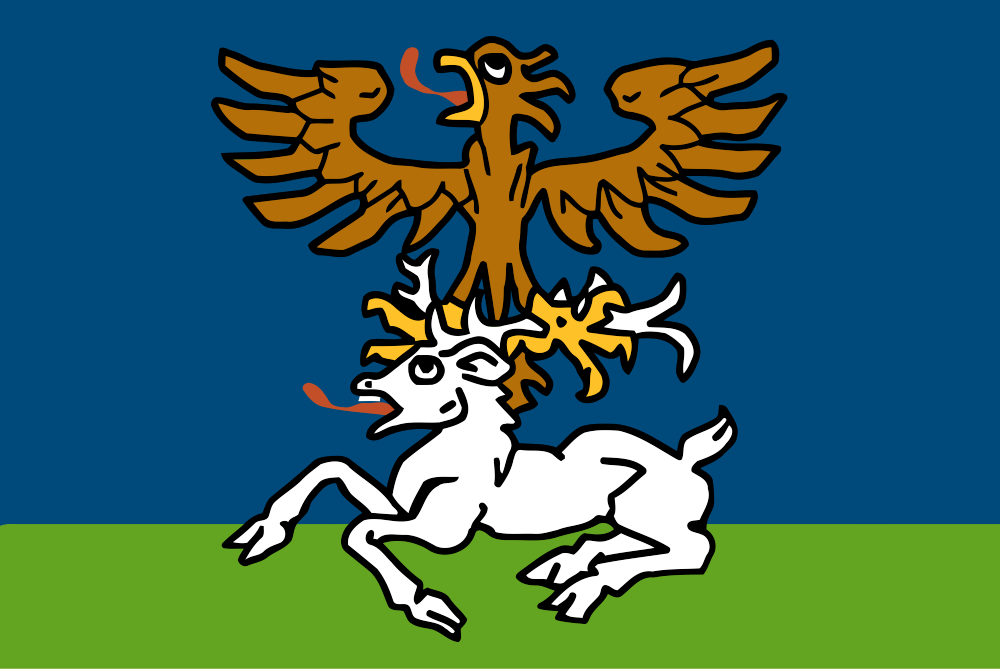
Flag of Val Camonica

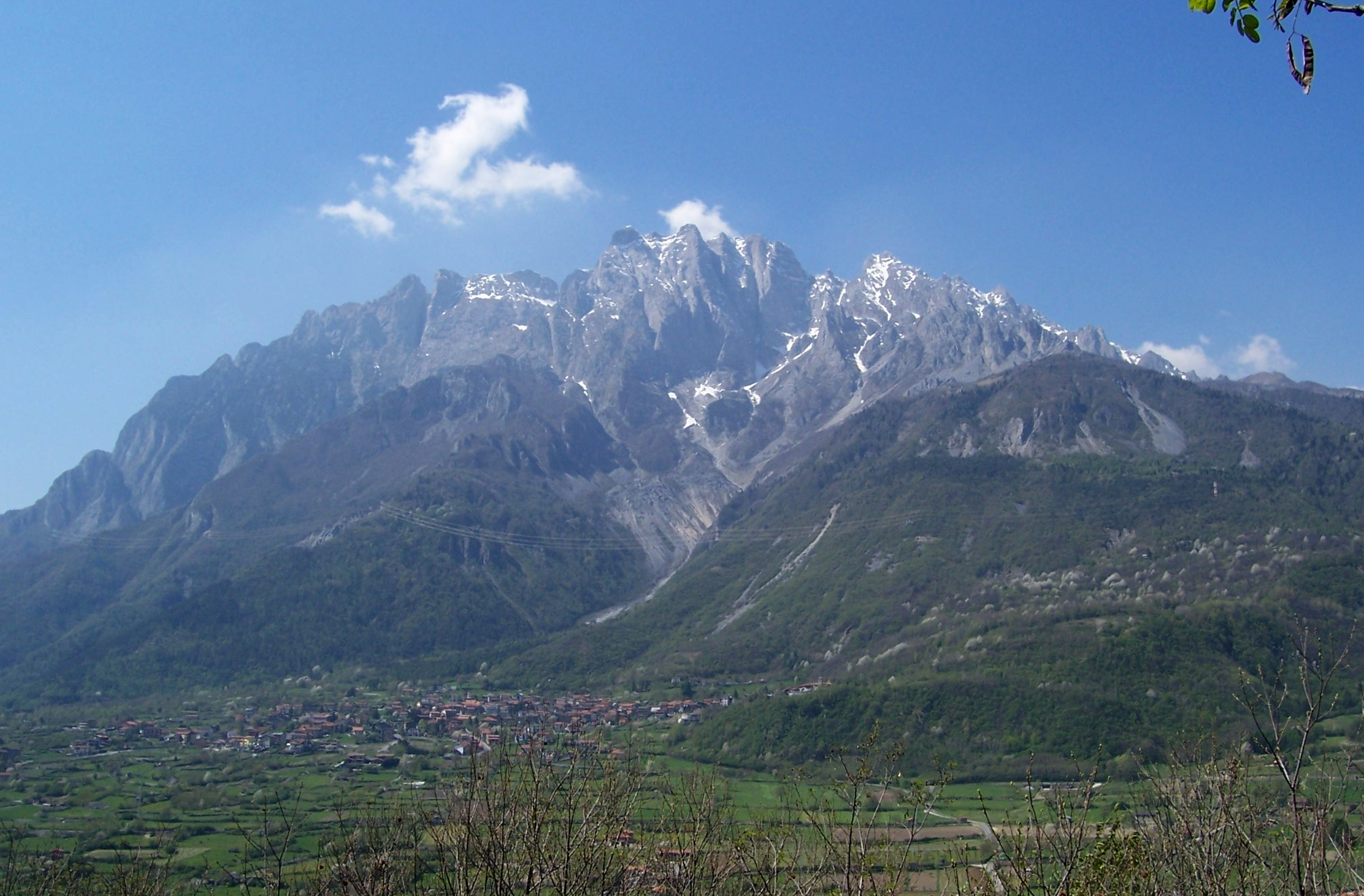
Mount Concarena

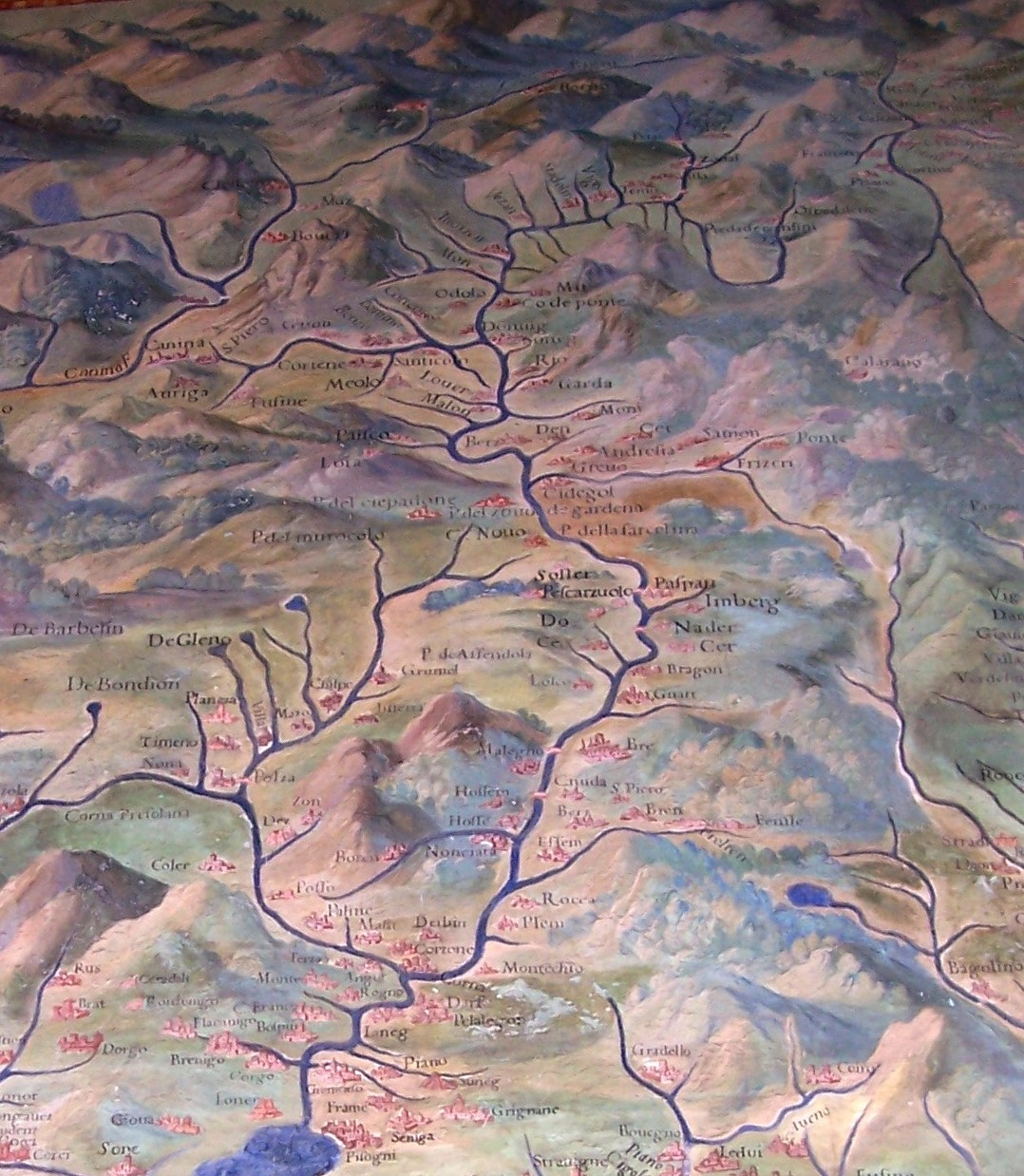
Map of Val Camonica (16th C., The Gallery of Maps, Vatican Museums)

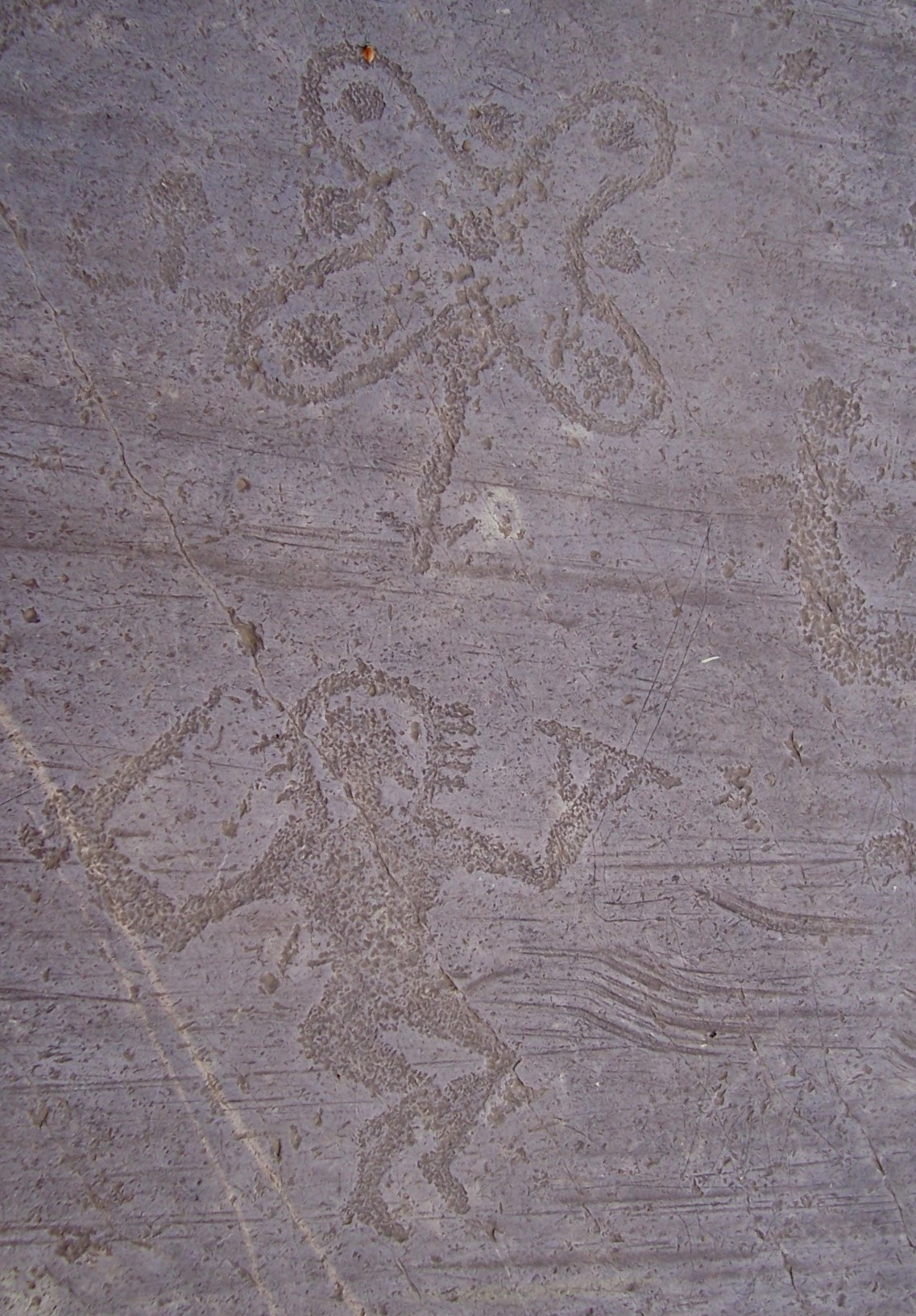
Rock engravings (an "astronaut" and a Camunian rose), Nadro

Roman anphitheater at Cividate Camuno

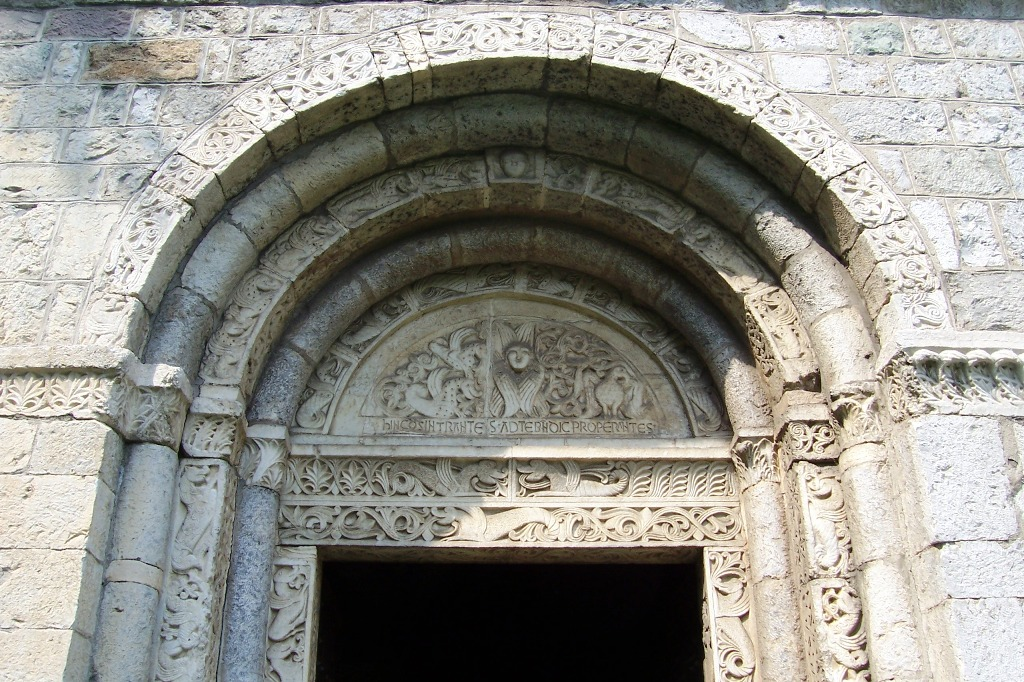
Portal of the parish church of St Siro, Capo di Ponte

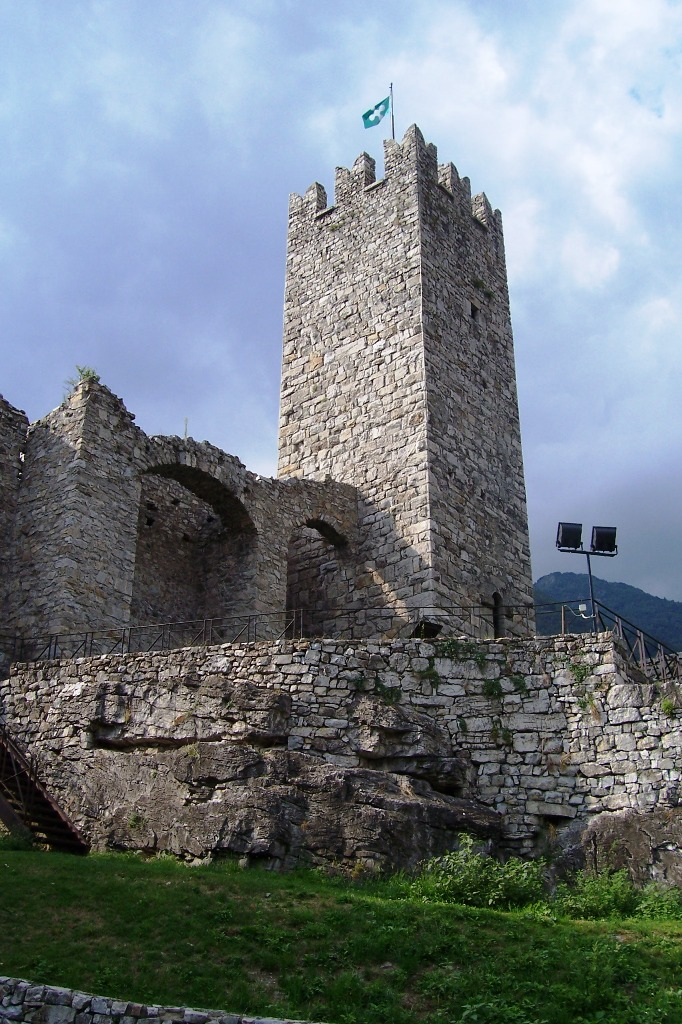
The castle at Breno

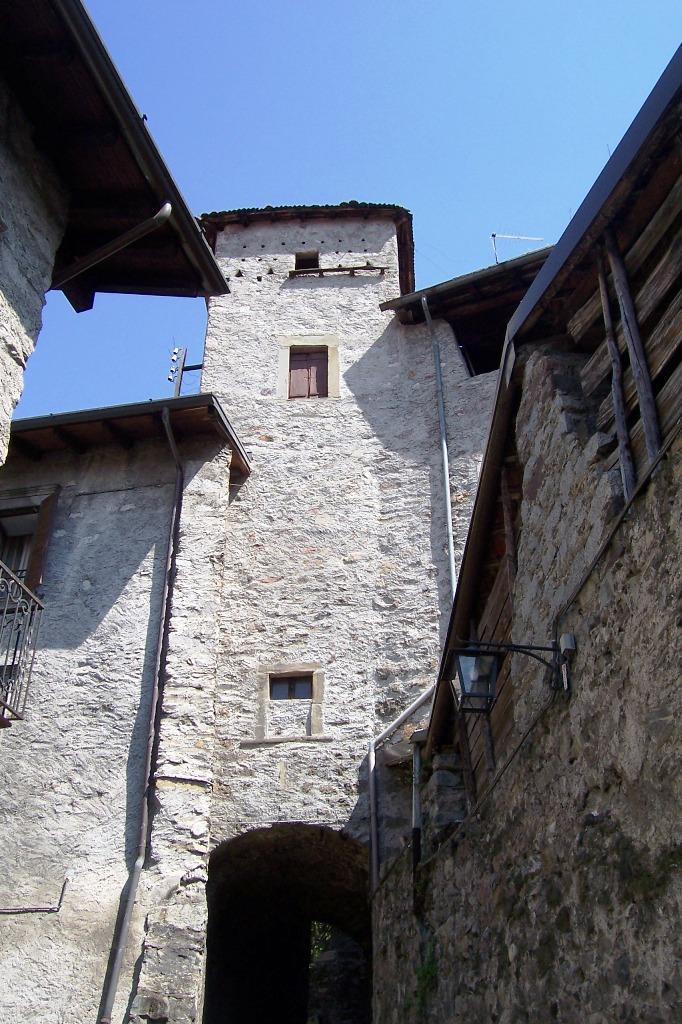
Tower in Bienno

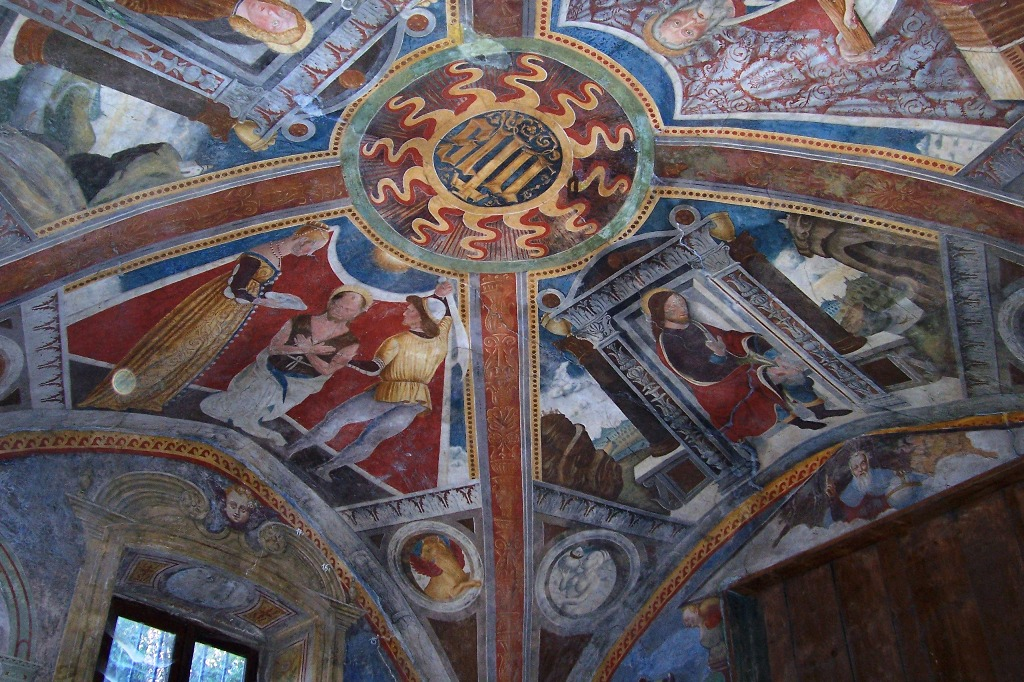
Church of the Holy Trinity, Esine

Val Camonica or Valcamonica (Eastern Lombard: Al Camònega), also Valle Camonica and anglicized as Camonica Valley, is one of the largest valleys of the central Alps, in eastern Lombardy, Italy. It extends about 90 kilometres (56 mi) from the Tonale Pass to Corna Trentapassi, in the commune of Pisogne near Lake Iseo. It has an area of about 1,335 km^{2} (515 mi^{2}) (Note: Area of the municipalities, excluding Val di Scalve) and 118,323 inhabitants. (Note: Sum of ISTAT data of communes at 31 December 2007) The River Oglio runs through it, rising at Ponte di Legno and flowing into Lake Iseo between Pisogne and Costa Volpino.

Almost all of the valley is included in the administrative territory of the province of Brescia, except for Lovere, Rogno, Costa Volpino and the Val di Scalve, which belong to the province of Bergamo. Since 1979, the rock drawings along the valley have been a UNESCO World Heritage Site, while the entire valley became a UNESCO World Biosphere Reserve in 2018.

== Etymology ==
Val Camonica is derived from the Latin Vallis Camunnorum, "Valley of the Camunni."

== Geography ==
=== Territory ===
Val Camonica can be divided into three main areas:

1. Lower Val Camonica: a flat area of meadows and fields, starting from the shores of Lake Iseo and extending to the transverse ridge of Bienno, sometimes called the Breno Threshold.
2. Middle Val Camonica: extending from the Breno Threshold to the municipality of Sonico – Edolo. The lower middle valley extends from Breno to Sellero, while the upper middle valley starts at the narrow gorge at Cedegolo and extends to Sonico – Edolo.
3. High Val Camonica: This part of the valley follows the Periadriatic Seam, and is oriented from east to west. Starting in the Val di Corteno, it continues to Ponte di Legno at the top of the valley. Its climate is similar to that of central Valtellina.

The valley is bounded by these borders:

North	East	South	West
Province of Sondrio; Valtellina; Valfurva	Trentino; Val di Sole; Val Rendena; Province of Brescia; Val Trompia; Val Sabbia	Lake Iseo; Province of Bergamo; Val Borlezza	Province of Bergamo; Val Cavallina; Val Seriana; Val di Scalve (Note: The Val di Scalve is a side valley of Val Camonica, but has always been a separate entity both historically and administratively.)

=== Hydrography ===
Val Camonica is traversed by the River Oglio, Italy's fifth-longest river, which rises at Ponte di Legno from the confluence of the Frigidolfo and Narcanello rivers. It flows into Lake Iseo between the municipalities of Pisogne and Costa Volpino.

Numerous streams, some of them seasonal, descend from the mountainsides and flow into the Oglio.

At high altitude there are many alpine lakes, including Lago Moro, and many artificial reservoirs, such as the Lago d'Arno.

== History ==
Val Camonica likely became habitable only around 15,000 years ago, at the end of last ice age, with the melting of the glacier that first carved out the valley. It is likely that the first humans visited the valley in epipaleolithic times, and appear to have settled by the Neolithic period. When the Ancient Romans extended their dominions north of the River Po, they encountered a people called the Camunni, who were a Rhaetian tribe, populating the valley. About 300,000 petroglyphs survive from this period. By the end of the first century BC, the Valle Camonica was ruled by Ancient Rome, which established the city of Cividate Camuno, with baths, an amphitheater and a large temple dedicated to Minerva.

During the Middle Ages, numerous clashes between the Guelphs and Ghibellines took place in this region. The Guelphs supported the power of the Bishop of Brescia and the papacy, while the Ghibellines sided with the Holy Roman Emperor. In 1287 the Val Camonica rebelled against control by Brescia and sided with the Visconti, lords of Milan, who extended their control over the area during the 14th century. From 1427 to 1454 there were numerous battles between the Duchy of Milan and the Republic of Venice for the control of the valley. Ultimately the valley came under the control of Venice. During the following centuries, the civilian population grew and engaged in the iron trade.

Val Camonica was separated from Venice after Venice was conquered by Napoleon in 1797. After the deposition of Napoleon, the area was controlled by the Austro-Hungarian Empire. In 1859, Val Camonica was annexed to the Kingdom of Italy. During World War I battle lines stretched along its eastern border, across the Adamello Group. The battles fought in this area are known as the White War in the Adamello.

In 1955, the National Park of Naquane stone carvings at Capo di Ponte was created by the Archaeological Administration of Lombardy.

== Monuments and places of interest ==
=== UNESCO Site ===
Val Camonica is home to the greatest complex of rock drawings in Europe, containing approximately 300,000 petroglyphs from the epipaleolithic era to the Middle Ages.

- Parco nazionale delle incisioni rupestri di Naquane in Capo di Ponte
- Parco archeologico nazionale dei massi di Cemmo
- Parco archeologico comunale di Seradina-Bedolina in Capo di Ponte
- Parco archeologico di Asinino-Anvòia in Ossimo
- Parco archeologico comunale di Luine in Darfo Boario Terme
- Parco archeologico comunale di Sellero
- Parco archeologico comunale di Sonico
- Riserva naturale Incisioni rupestri di Ceto, Cimbergo e Paspardo in Nadro

Camonica was the first site in Italy included in UNESCO’s World Heritage list in 1979 because of its unique symbols and more than 140,000 figures carved over 8,000 years on rocks.

=== Medieval villages ===
- Bienno, recognised as one of the Most Beautiful Villages of Italy
- Lovere, also recognised as one of the Most Beautiful Villages of Italy
- Pescarzo (Capo di Ponte), a characteristic small town.

=== Castles ===
- Castle of Breno, the largest castle in Val Camonica
- Castle of Gorzone, home of the Federici family, standing on a small hill next to the Dezzo torrent
- Castle of Cimbergo, in the valley of the Re, dominates the middle Valley
- Castle of Lozio, the fortress where the Lozio Massacre occurred
- Castle of Mù, the Federici bastion in the upper valley, of which only the foundations remain

=== Roman city ===
- Theatre and Amphitheater at Cividate Camuno
- Temple of Minerva at Breno

=== Mountain excursions ===
- CAI paths in the Parco dell'Adamello
- First World War (so-called "Guerra Bianca in Adamello") trench at Vezza d'Oglio

=== Roman Baths ===
- Boario Terme
- Angolo Terme

=== Museums and theme parks ===
- Parco tematico Archeopark, Darfo Boario Terme
- Museo etnografico del ferro, delle arti e tradizioni popolari, Bienno
- Museo Civico Camuno, Breno
- Museo didattico di arte e vita preistorica, Capo di Ponte
- Museo didattico della riserva, Nadro
- Museo archeologico di Valle Camonica, Cividate Camuno
- Mostra museo Camillo Golgi, Corteno Golgi
- Museo etnografico, Ossimo
- Museo parrocchiale d'arte sacra, Ponte di Legno
- Museo della Guerra Bianca in Adamello, Temù

=== Notable sanctuaries and churches ===
- Chiesa di Santa Maria della Neve in Pisogne
- Chiesa di Sant'Antonio in Breno
- Chiesa di Santa Maria Annunziata in Bienno
- Santuario del Cristo Re in Bienno
- Chiesa di Santa Maria Assunta in Esine
- Monastero di San Salvatore in Capo di Ponte
- Oratorio dei Disciplini in Montecchio
- Pieve di San Siro in Cemmo
- Santuario della Via Crucis in Cerveno (Sacri Monti)

=== Winter sports ===
- Winter sports Centers at Ponte di Legno, Borno, Montecampione, Aprica and Val Palot

== Photo gallery ==
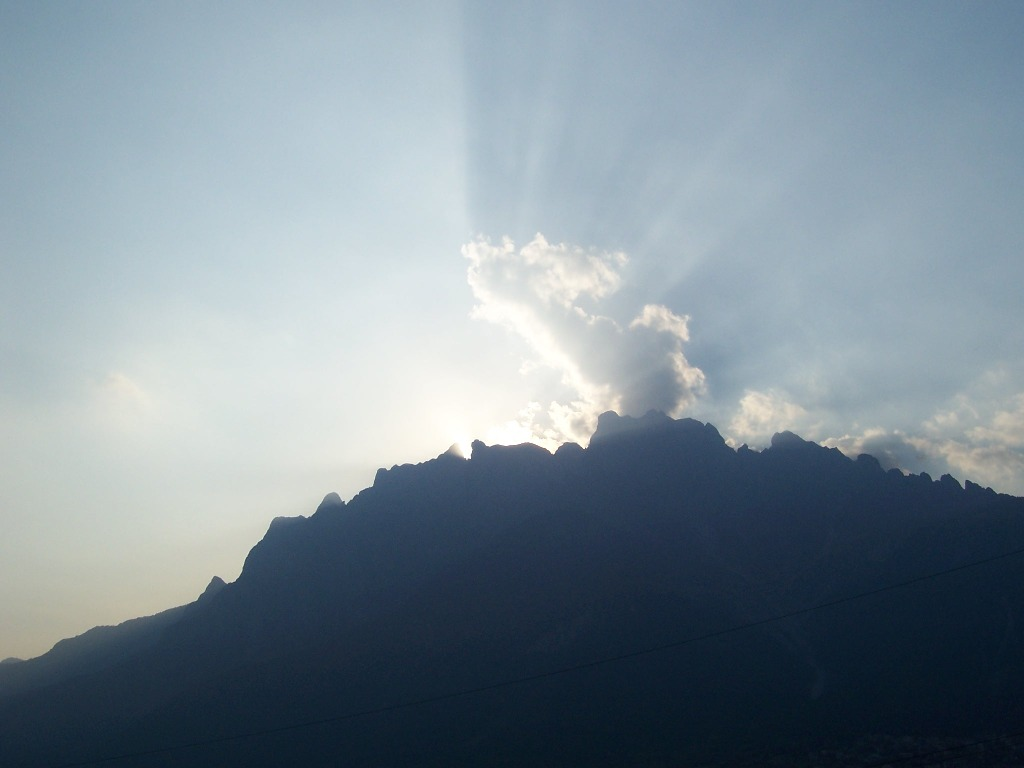
Concarena

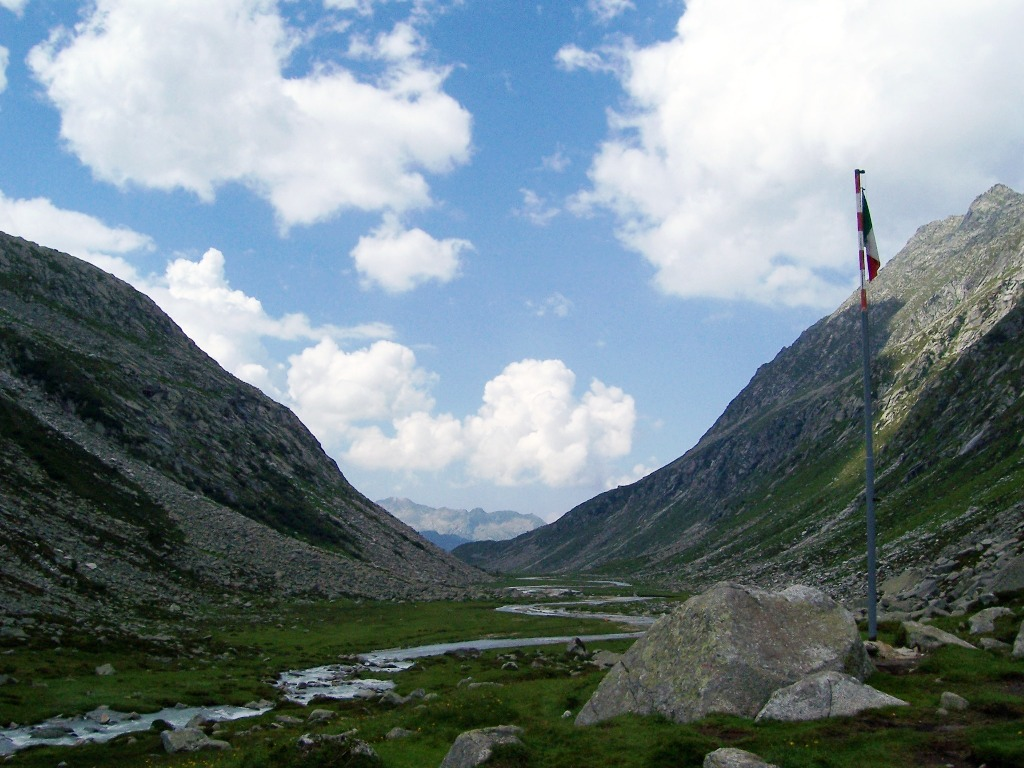
Valle Adamé

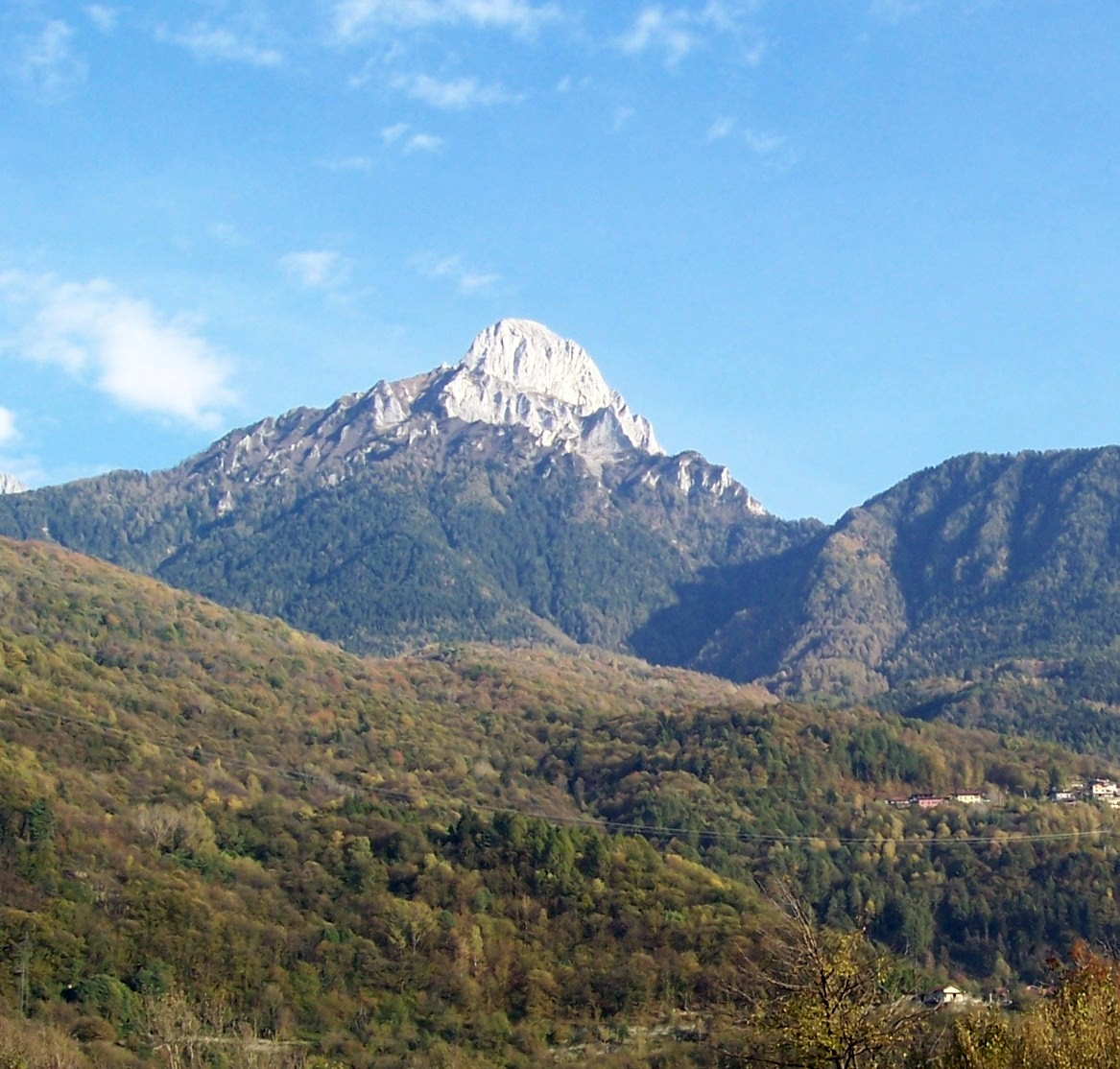
Pizzo Badile Camuno

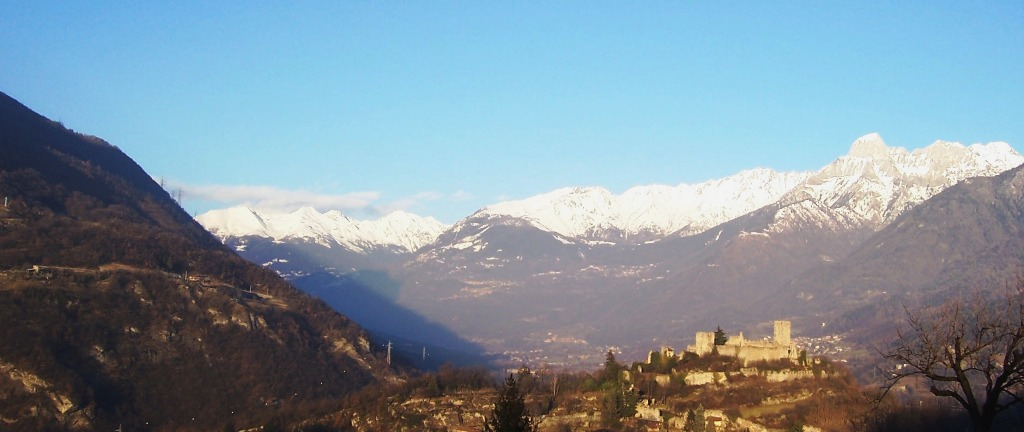
Valle Camonica from Breno to north

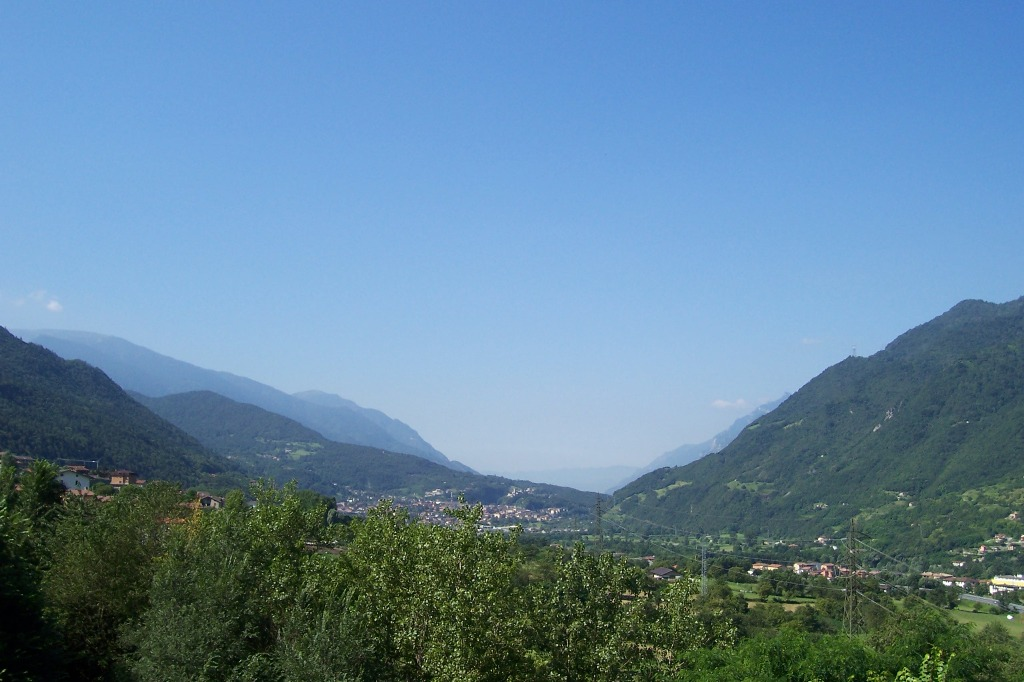
Valle Camonica from Braone to south

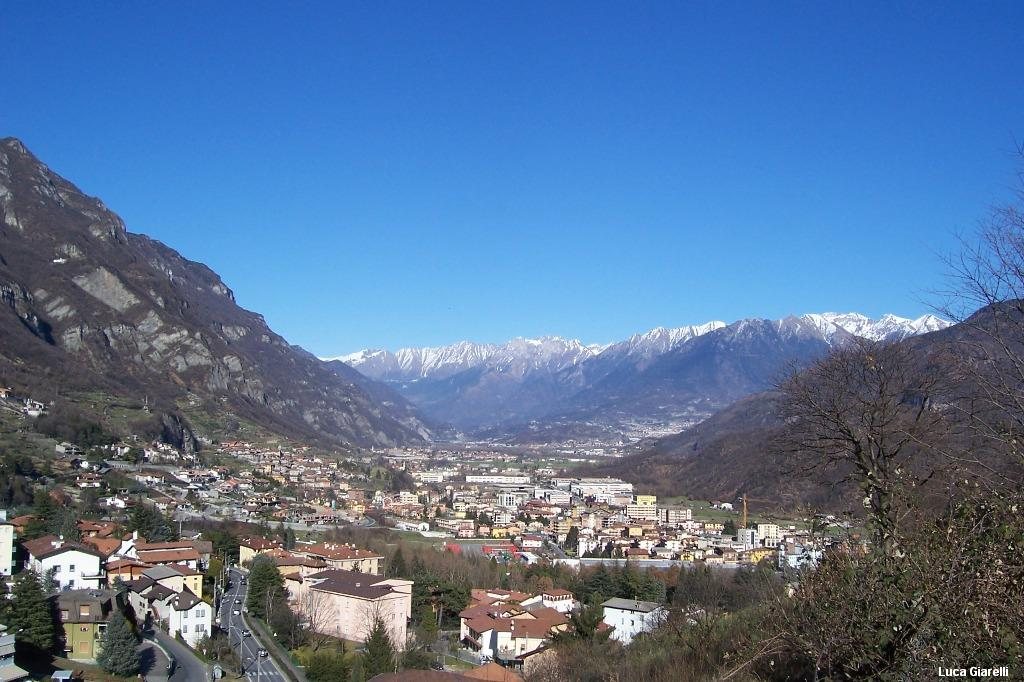
Valle Camonica from Gorzone

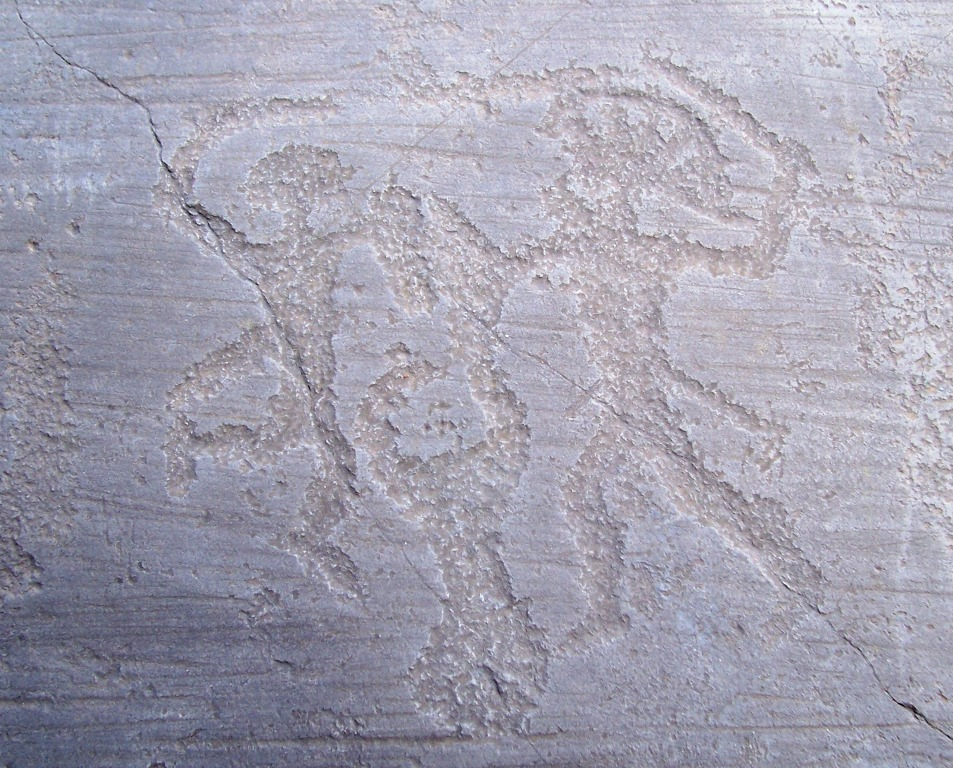
Petroglyph from Foppe of Nadro

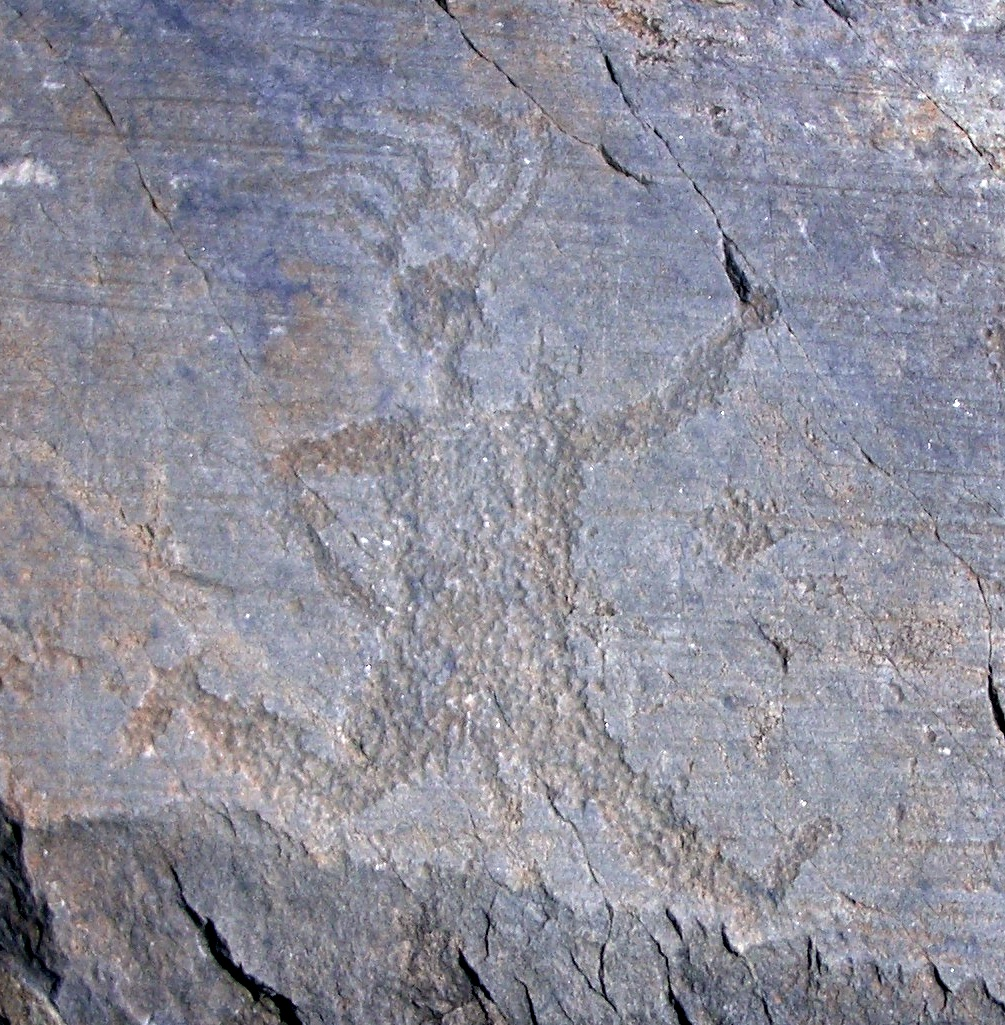
Running Priest in Capo di Ponte

== See also ==
- Camunni
- Rock Drawings in Valcamonica
- Val Camonica witch trials
- Lake Pantano d'Avio
- Lake Benedetto
- Lake Baitone
