= Abbey of Santa Giustina =

10th-century Benedictine abbey in Padua, Italy

Abbey of Saint Justina
- Abbazia di Santa Giustina
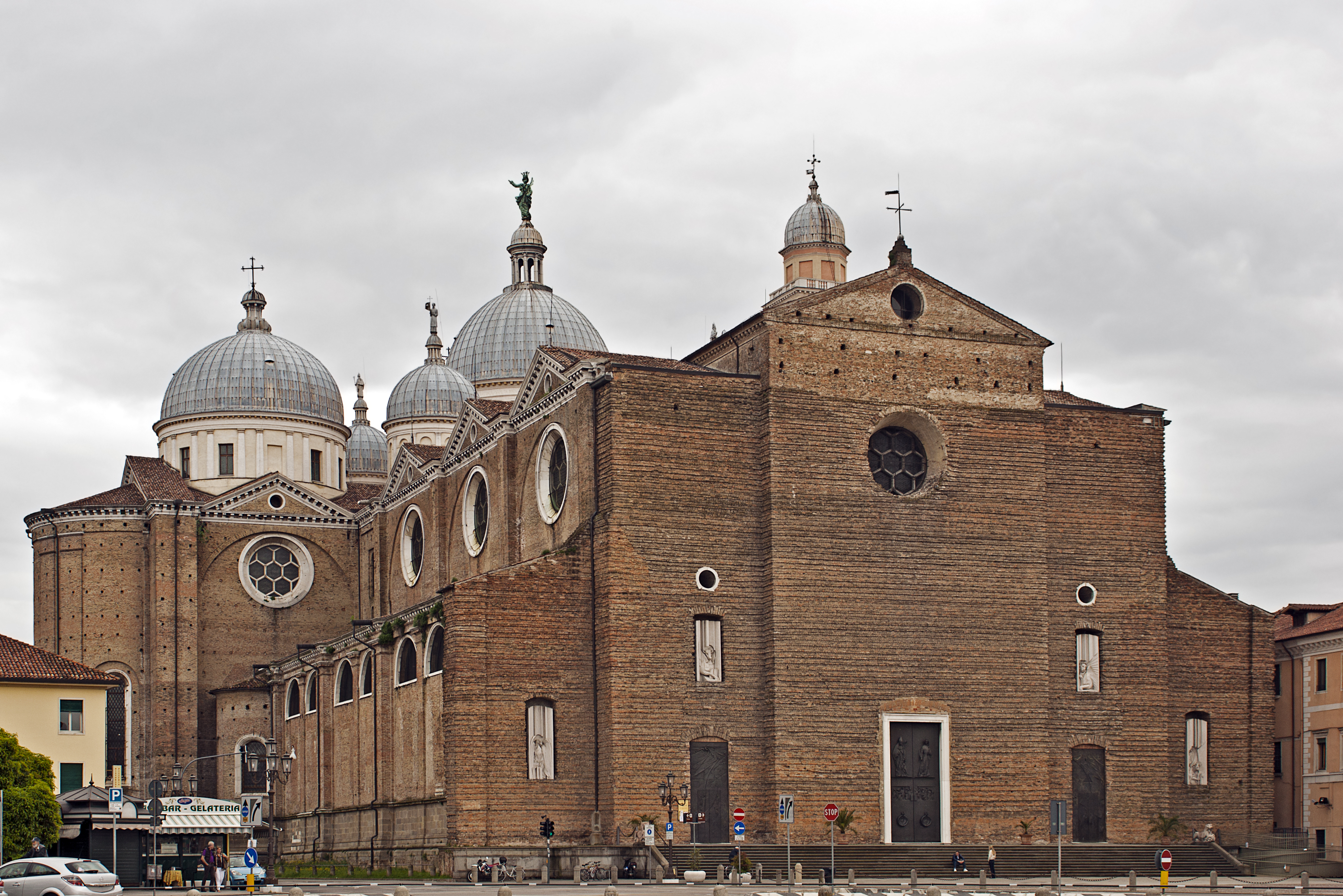
- Basilica of Saint Justina
- Interactive map of Abbey of Saint Justina

Monastery information
- Order: Order of St. Benedict
- Established: 10th century
- Dedication: Saint Justina of Padua
- Diocese: Padua

People
- Abbot: Francesco Trolese, O.S.B.

Architecture
- Heritage designation: National monument

Site
- Coordinates: 45°23′47″N 11°52′47″E

The Abbey of Santa Giustina is a 10th-century Benedictine abbey complex located in front of the Prato della Valle in central Padua, region of Veneto, Italy. Adjacent to the former monastery is the basilica church of Santa Giustina, initially built in the 6th century, but whose present form derives from a 17th-century reconstruction.

== History ==
A church dedicated to Saint Justina of Padua and other 4th-century Christian martyrs of Padua, was present at the site by the 520s, erected under the patronage of the Prefect Opilius and housing the relics of the saint. The church was already described as lavish in decoration in the 565 biography "Life of St Martin", written by Venantius Fortunatus. By the 10th century, monks ministered to pilgrims who came to the basilica to venerate the saints' relics. In 971, the Bishop of Padua placed the community under the Rule of St. Benedict.

Renovations were soon begun on the basilica. On 2 August 1052, workers putatively exhumed remains of various saints, including Maximus the Confessor, Felicitas of Padua, Julian the Hospitaller, and even some identified as the Holy Innocents. In 1110 the abbey was sacked by the troops of the future Holy Roman Emperor Henry V during his invasion of Lombardy, in order to punish the monks for their loyalty to Pope Pascal II. In 1117, the complex was devastated by the powerful Verona earthquake. After the basilica and monastery were rebuilt, excavations resumed and in 1174 the remains of the patroness of the abbey were discovered, and in 1177, some remains attributed to St Luke the Evangelist.

A period of decline in the observance of its way of life began to develop in the monastic community. At the same time, the monks were led by a number of very spiritual abbots, such as Arnaldo of Limena, who died while imprisoned by Ezzelino III da Romano and is honored as "Blessed", as is Nicholas of Prussia. By the 1370s the community had declined to three monks.

The abbey, however, reached the height of its influence under the leadership of Ludovico Barbo, who, despite being a canon regular and not a monk, was appointed as abbot by the bishop in order to undertake a reform of the monastic life in the abbey. He was successful and the abbey became the nucleus of the Congregation of Santa Giustina, which spread to include monasteries throughout Europe who came under the guidance of the Abbot of Santa Giustina. The abbey developed ties with centers of learning across the continent. In 1504 the Abbey of Monte Cassino was made subject to Santa Giustina in Padua, and together they became known as the Cassinese Congregation.

The religious community was suppressed in 1797 when, after the occupation of the region by Napoleon's French Revolutionary Army. Its artworks and the most valuable collections of the abbatial library were sent to Paris by the occupying forces. The monks were expelled and the buildings and property were sold off in 1810. The cloisters were then used as a military hospital, later as a barracks.

The buildings were returned to the Catholic Church in 1917 and Pope Benedict XV re-established the abbey with all its ancient rights and privileges. He placed it under the Abbey of Praglia in nearby Teolo, which sent monks to resume monastic life there. On 1 November 1942 the community was declared an autonomous priory, which was established under its own abbot on 22 January 1943. The basilica and abbey now have the government status of a national monument and operate under the authority of the Superintendent of Monuments and Civil Heritage.

== Interior ==
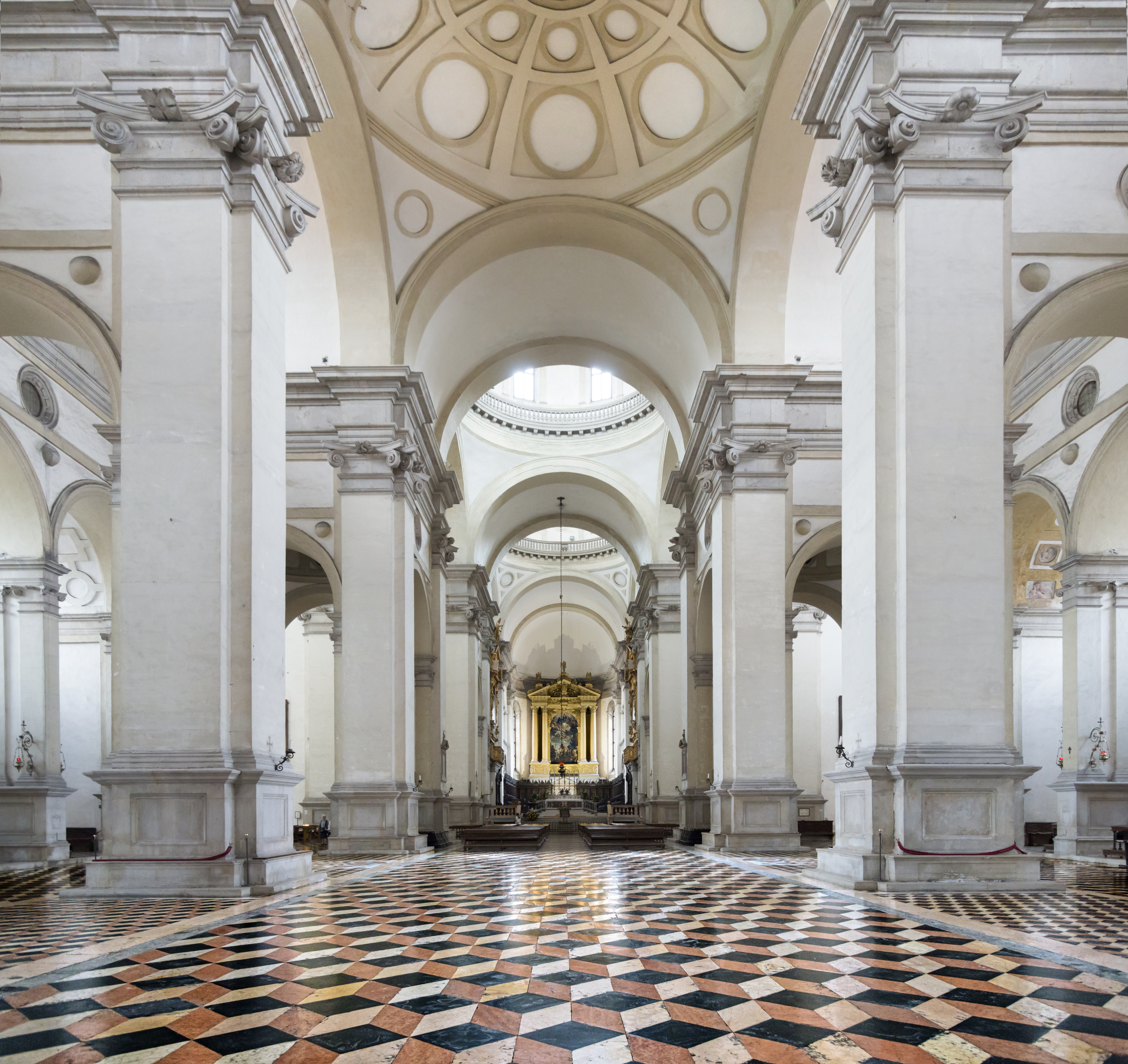
Nave of Basilica

The church has a layout of a Latin cross with the main axis from east to west. At 118.5 metres (389 ft) long and 82 metres (269 ft) wide, the Basilica of Santa Giustina is the seventh largest in Italy. The facade is enhanced by expanse of the Prato della Valle, which it overlooks. There are three main chapels. The presbytery with the choir, and the two chapels for saints Luke and Matthew that form the transepts. Each has a semicircular apse and are flanked by two chapels. Each aisle has six smaller chapels, square plan. The 26 pillars supporting the roof domes, each dome is set directly on the barrel vaults. The central bays are covered by eight domes covered with lead: the central one, with the lantern, is almost 70 metres (230 ft) high and is topped by a statue of copper depicting Santa Giustina, about 5 metres (16 ft) high. The floor of the basilica was laid between 1608 and 1615 on geometric design, with yellow, white and red marble. There are many pieces of Greek marble, from the Basilica Opilionea.

=== Left Nave ===
Capella di San Giacomo

The first chapel is dedicated to Saint James the Less. The altar is in polychrome stones in the style of the Corbarelli family of the seventeenth century. The white marble altarpiece shows an oil on canvas by Carlo Caliari: Martyrdom of Saint James.

Capella di San Gregorio Magno

The second chapel is dedicated to Pope Gregory I. The 19th-century altar is mainly built with African green marble and Carrara white marble, framing a polychrome stone marquetry; The stonework was performed by the Corbarelli family. The altarpiece is an 18th-century oil on canvas depicting Pope Gregory I invokes the aid of the Virgin to end the plague in Rome by Sebastiano Ricci. Ricci's work replaced an initial painting by Carlo Cignani.

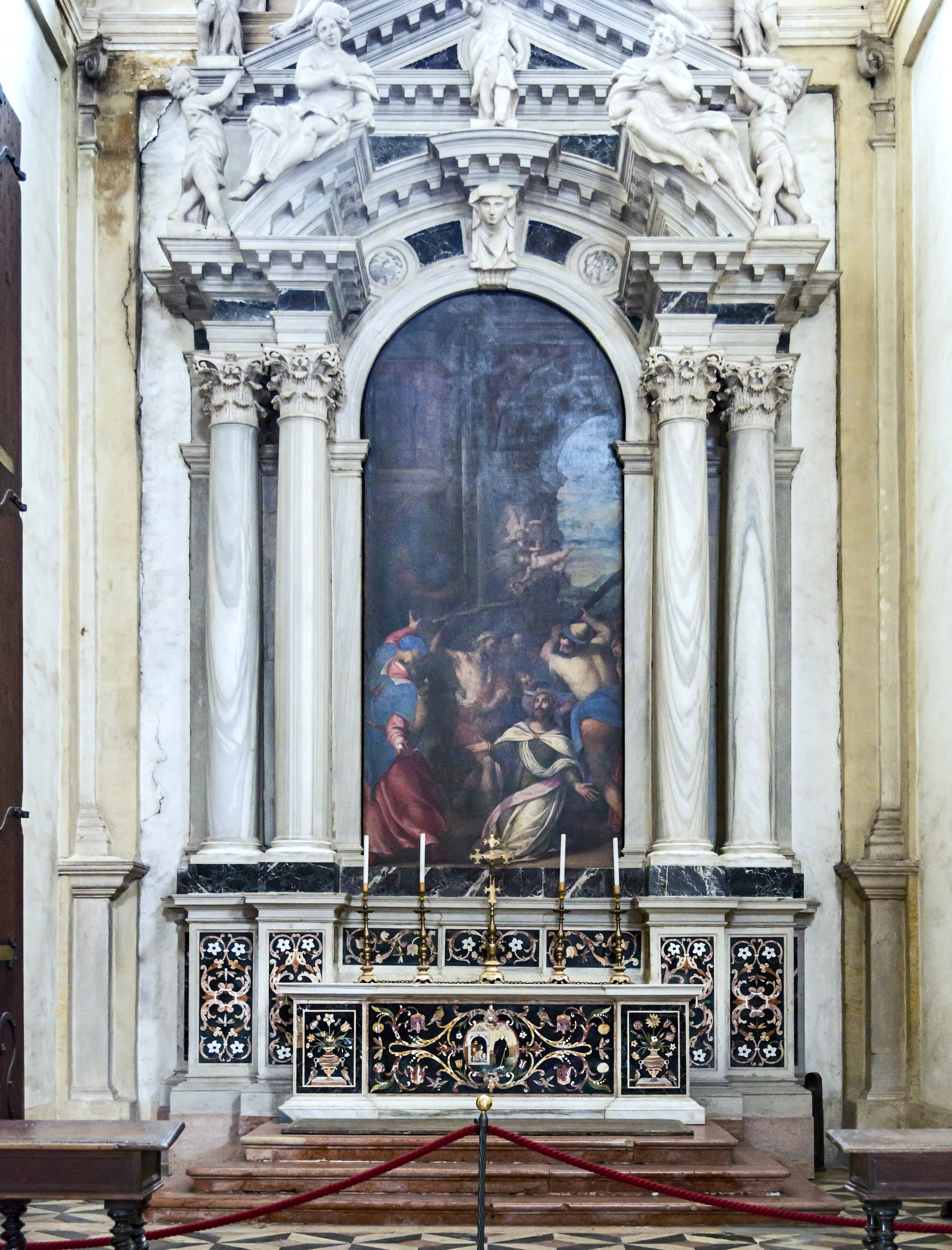
Capella di San Giacomo

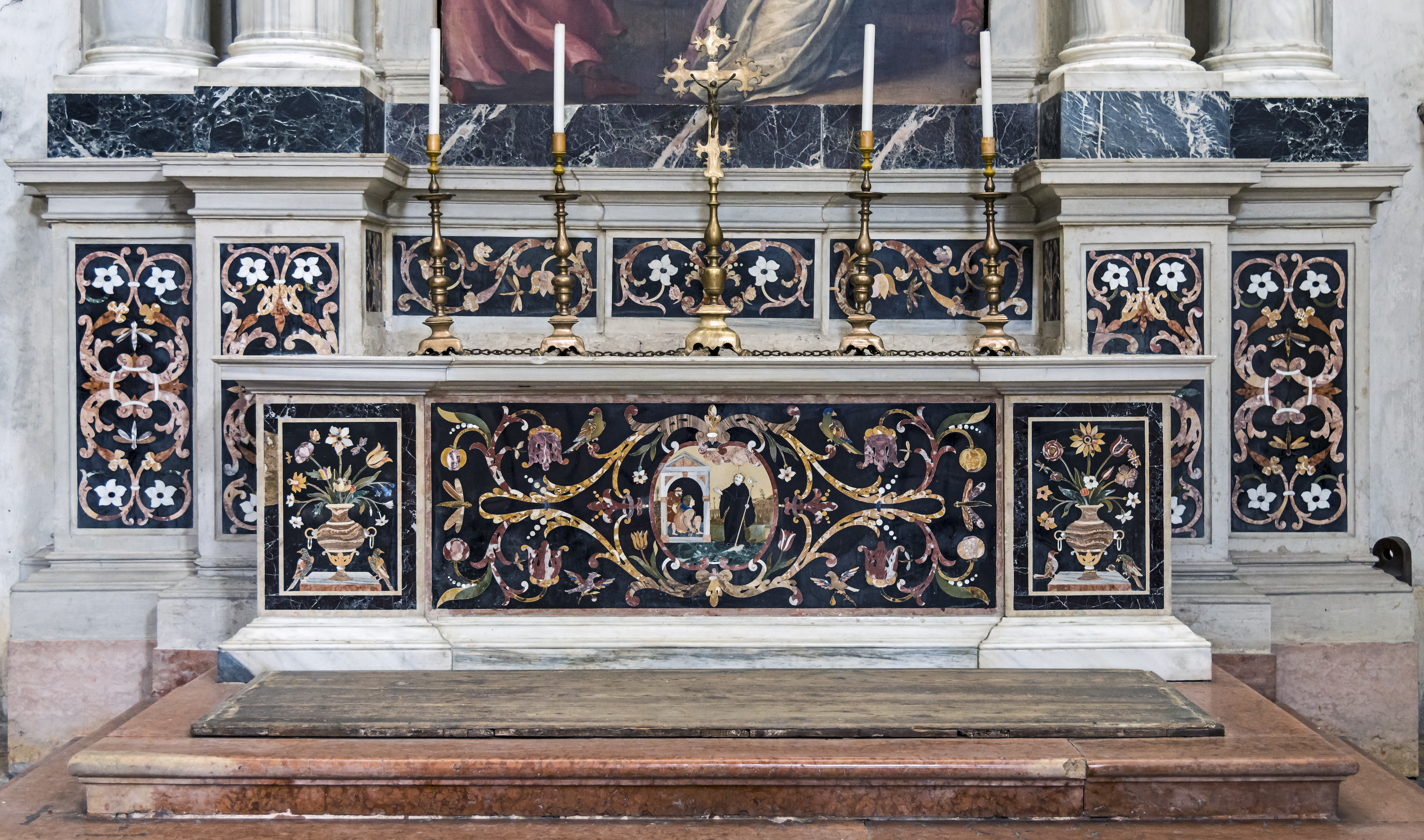
Altar in polychrome stone

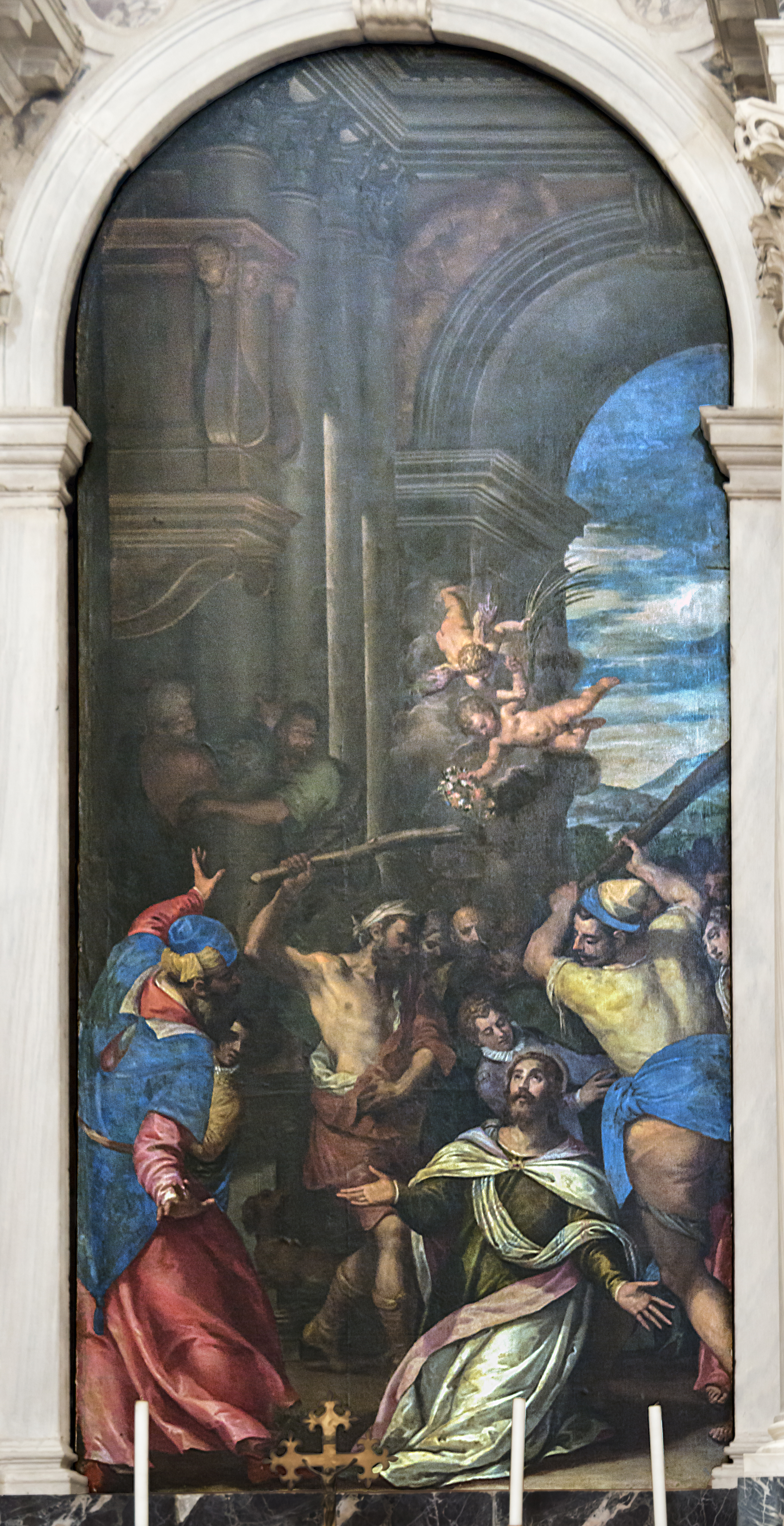
Martyrdom of St James the Less

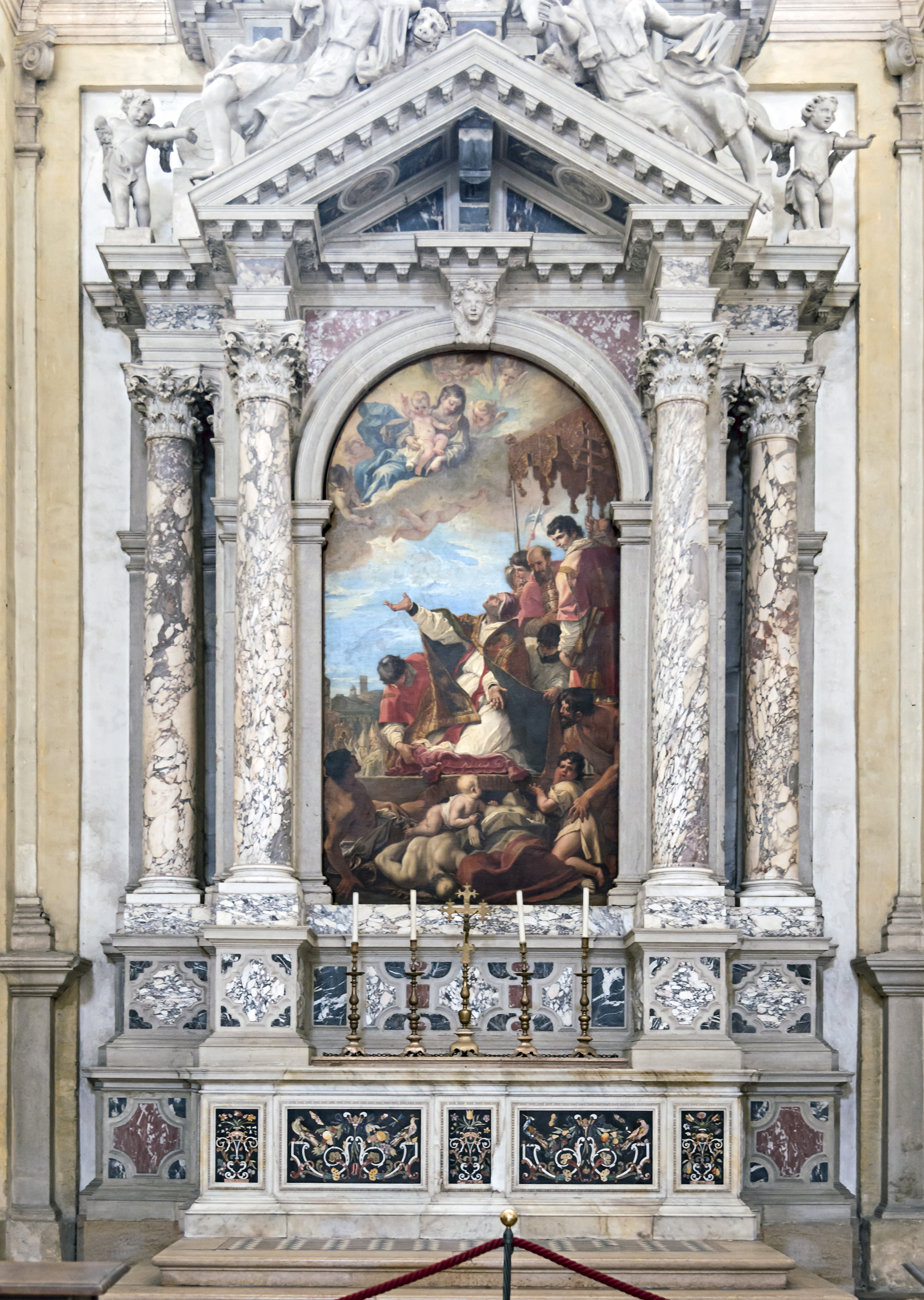
Chapel to Pope Gregory I

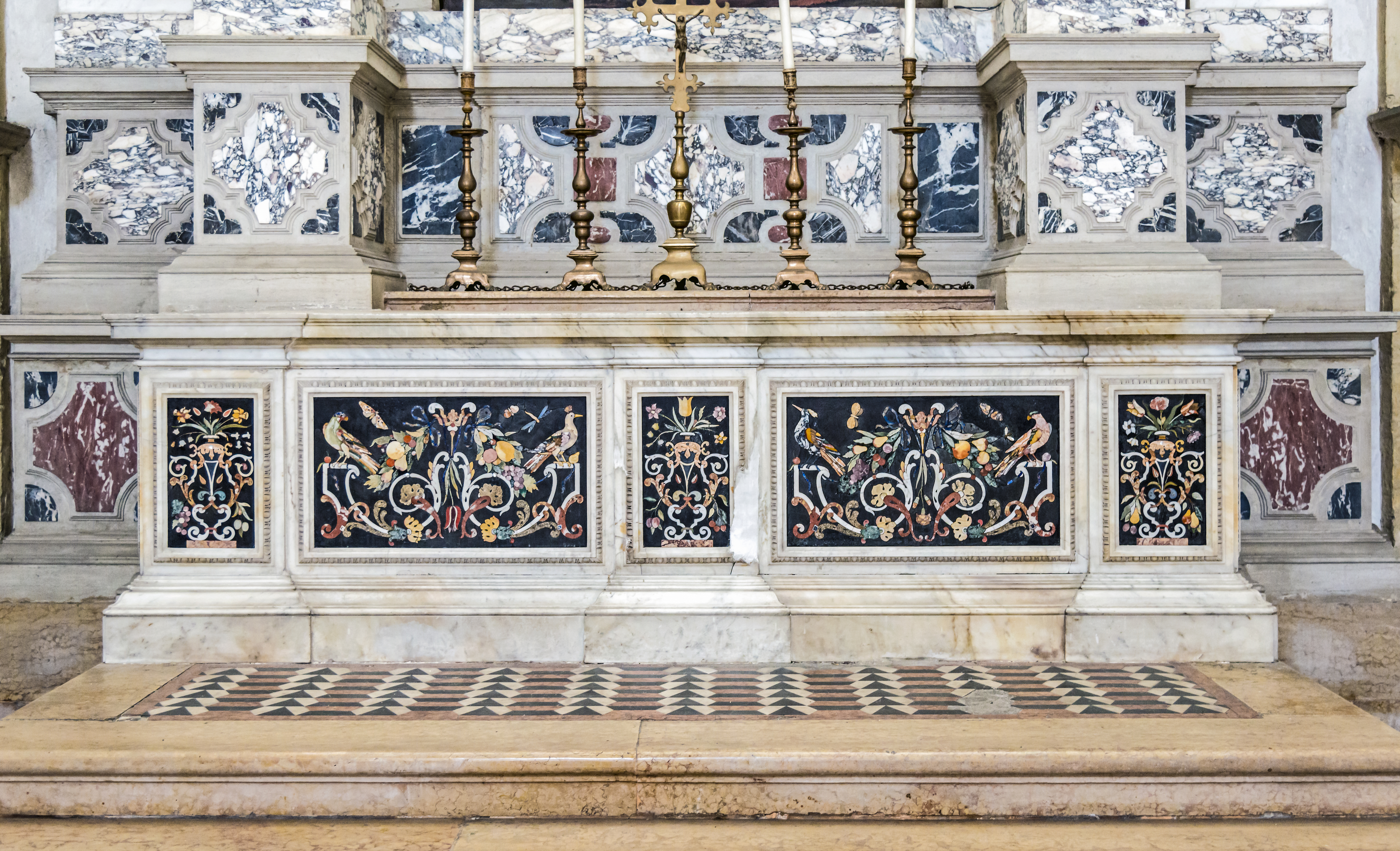
Altar in polychrome stone

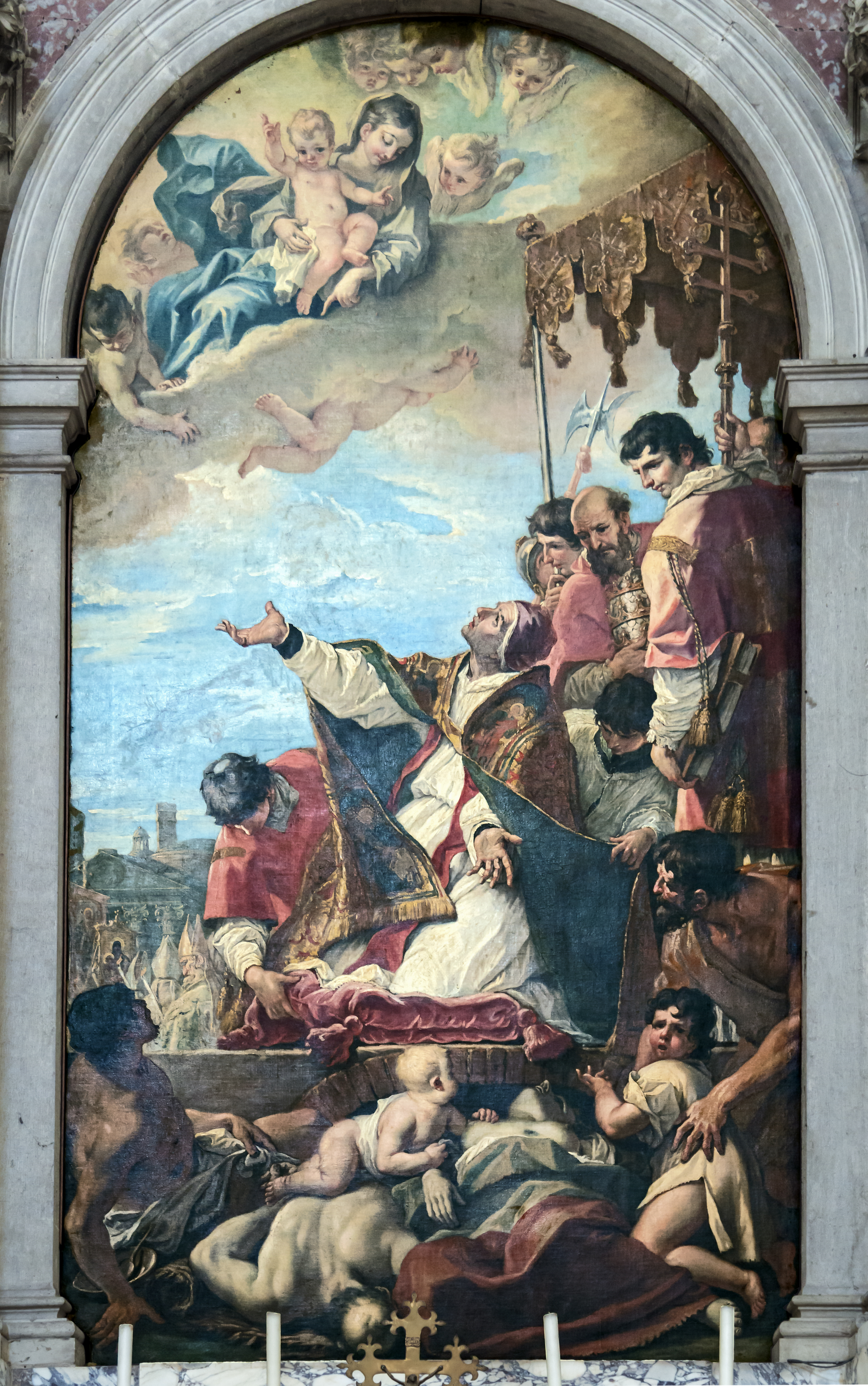
Altarpiece by Ricci

Cappella di san Daniele Levita

The third chapel is dedicated to Daniel of Padua. The altar is characterized by the use of red marble from France and the marbles of Carrara and Padua; the altarpiece depicts the Martyrdom of St Daniel (1677) by Antonio Zanchi. The altar is the work of the brothers Corbarelli.

Cappella di san Placido

The fourth chapel is dedicated to St. Placid the Martyr. The oil on canvas altarpiece depicts the Martyrdom of Saint Placidus and companions (1676) by Luca Giordano. Note the refined decoration of the Corbarelli family inlaid with polychrome stone behind the altar.

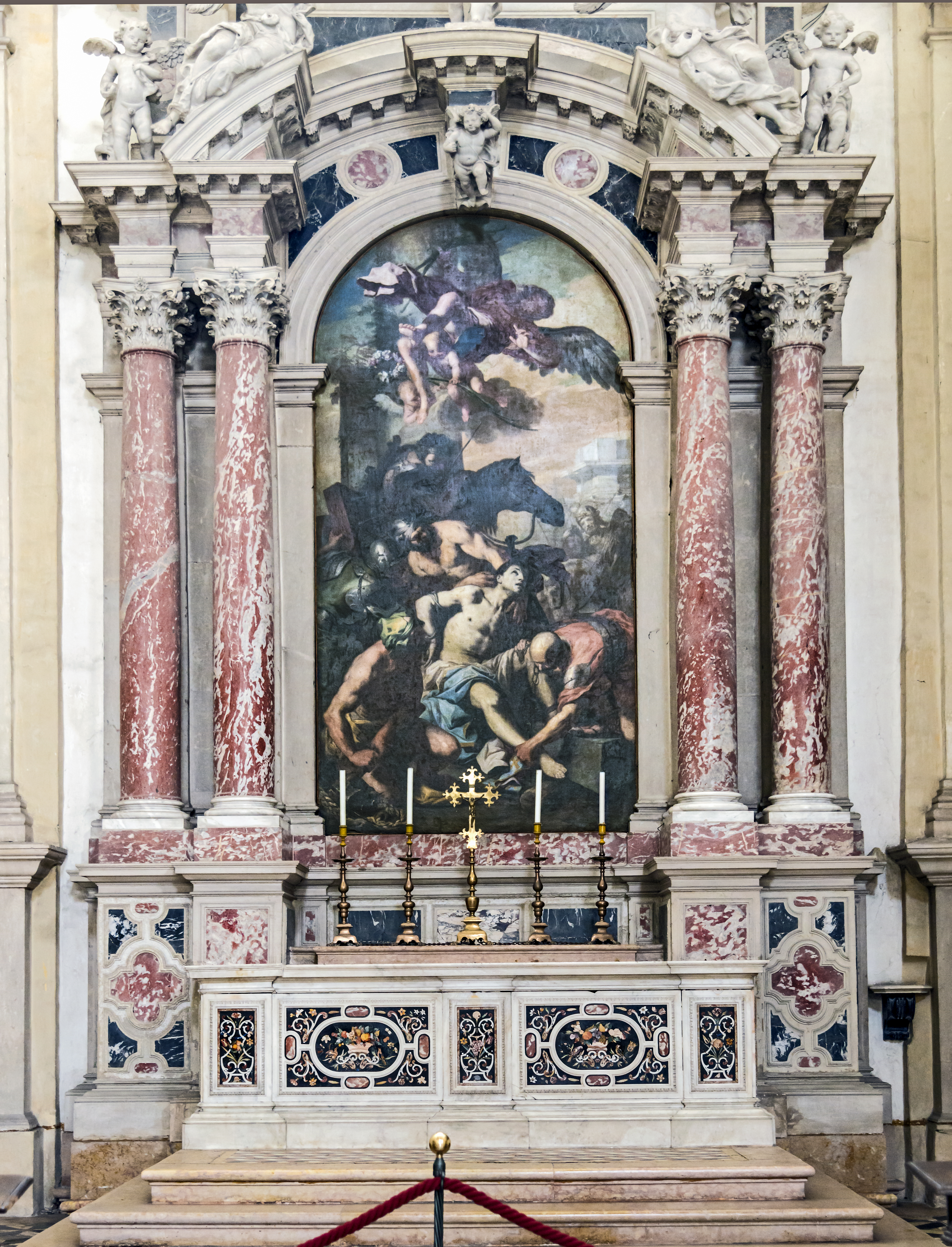
Chapel of St. Daniel of Padua

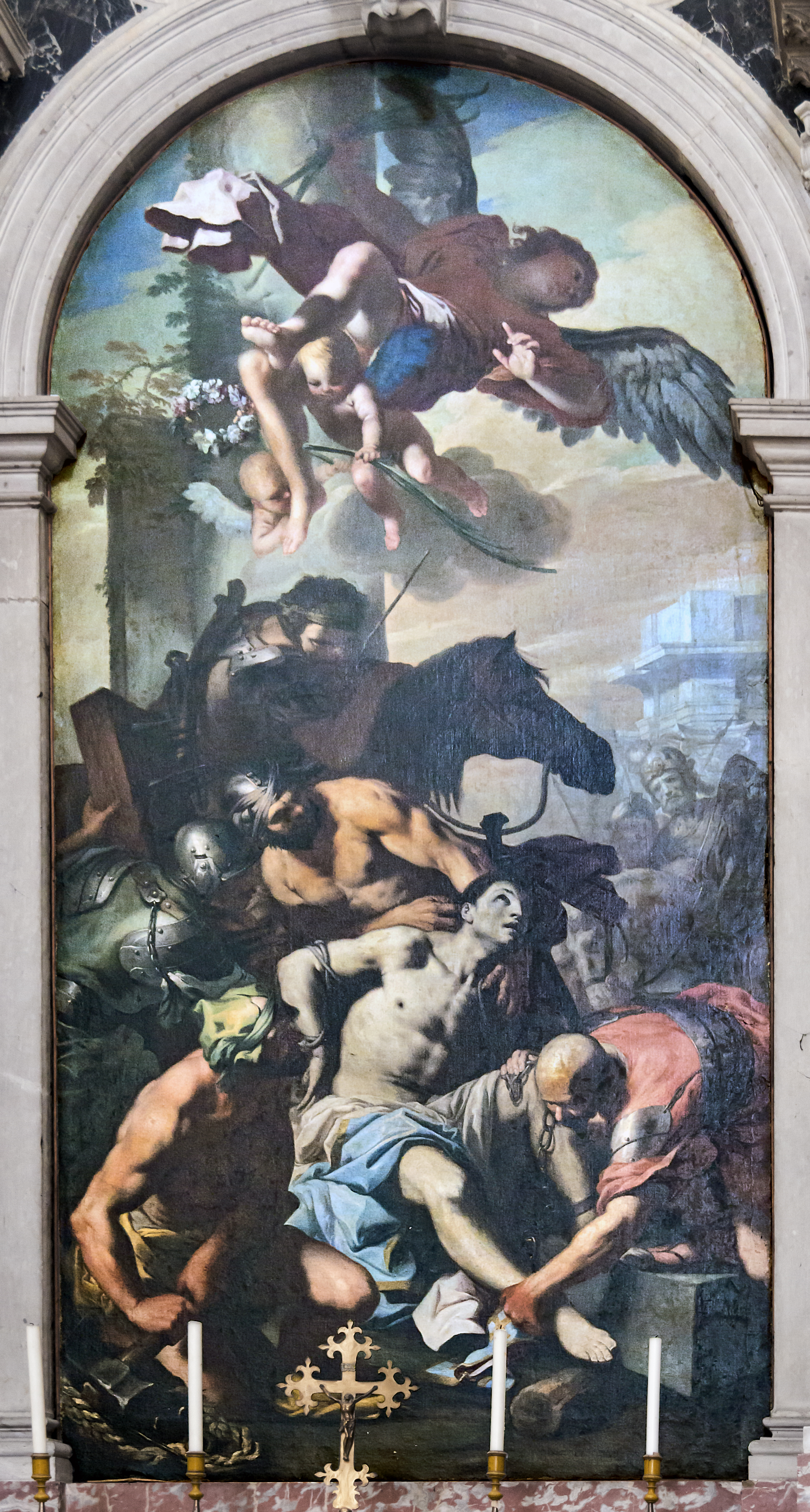
Martyrdom of Saint Daniel

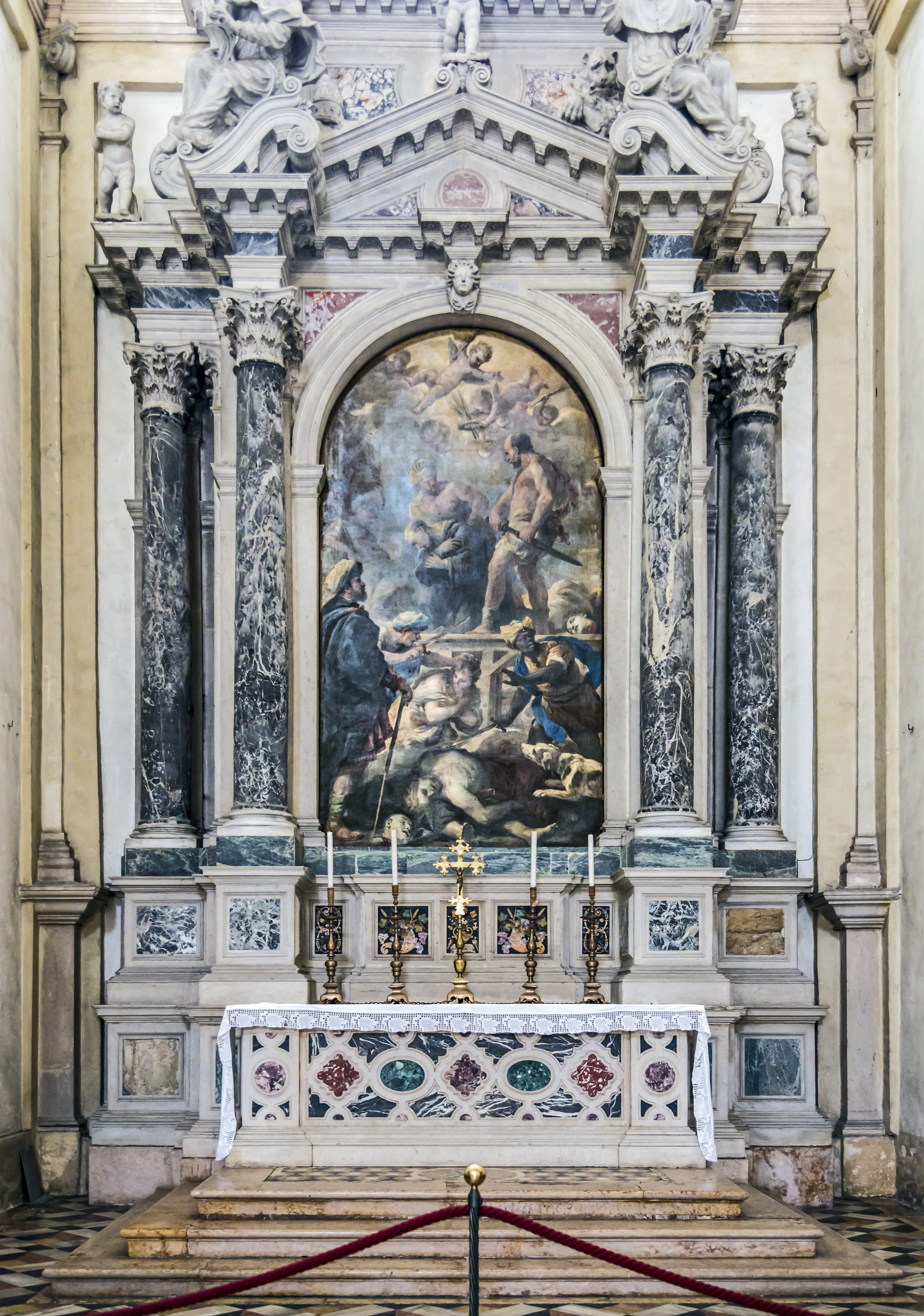
Chapel of St. Placidus

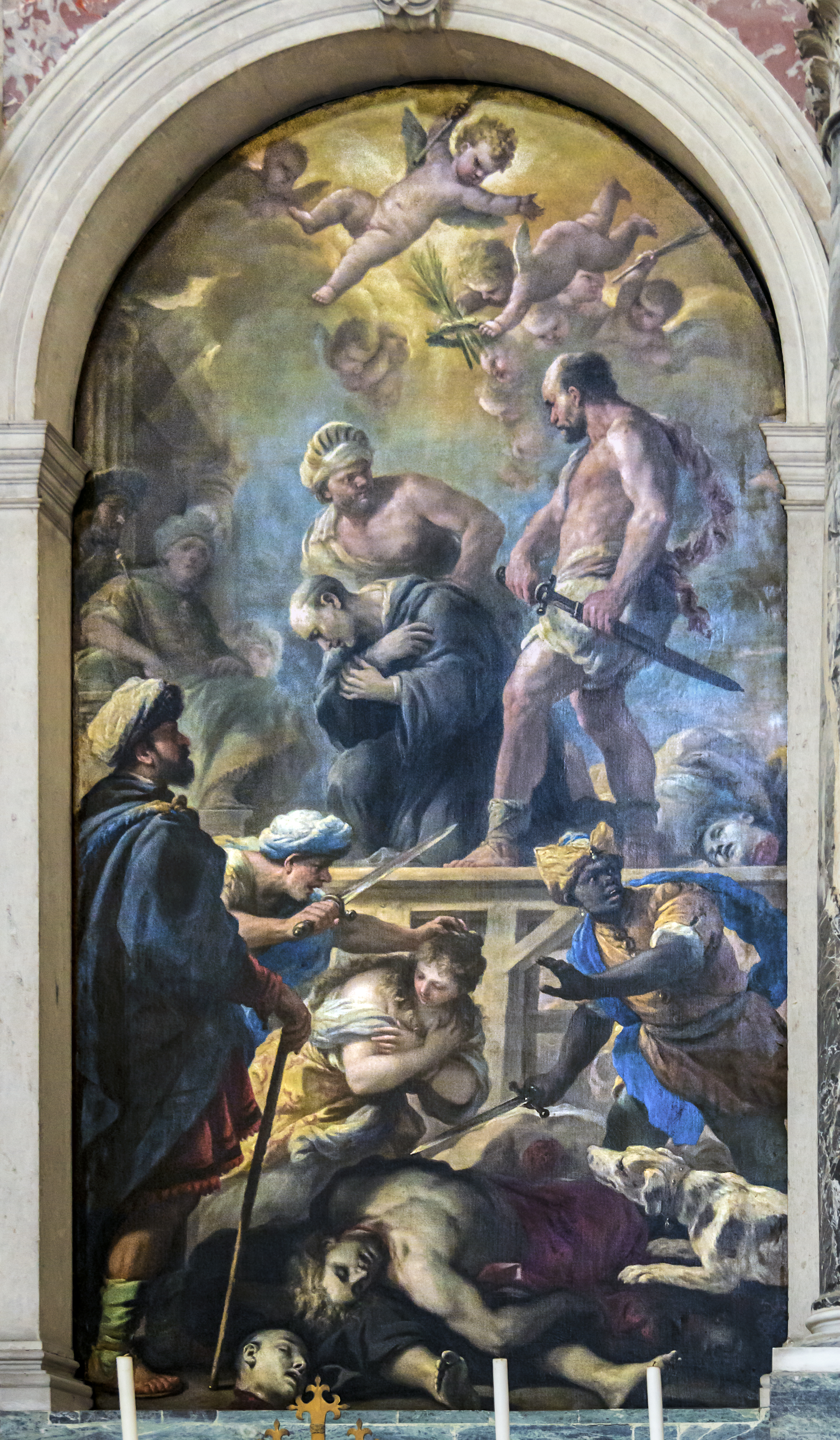
Martyrdom of Saint Placidus and companions by Giordano

Cappella di San Mauro

The fifth chapel is dedicated to Saint Maurus. The altarpiece is in black and white marble from Genoa; The altar of green marble, marble of Genoa, and red marble of France. The altarpiece representing "Saint Maurus invoked by the sick" (1673) by Valentin Le Febvre.

Cappella di Giuliano martire

The sixth chapel is dedicated to Saint Julien. The altar contains the tomb of Saint Julien with his statue (1680) sculpted by Giovanni Comin. The statues of Saints Andrew and Matthew were sculpted by Bernardo Falcone.

Cappella di Santa Felicita

The seventh and last chapel on the left side of the nave is dedicated to Saint Felicity. The chapel houses the monumental altar surmounted by the urn containing the remains of the saint, discovered in 1502 in the Chapel of Saint Prosdocime of Padua. The sculptures are by Orazio Marinali and plays on the colors of white and red marble from France. The statue of the saint in prayer is placed on the urn, on the sides two angels and Saints Mark and Simon. The altar is very refined, decorated by brothers Corbarelli: it represents fountains, gardens and the unfinished façade of the basilica.

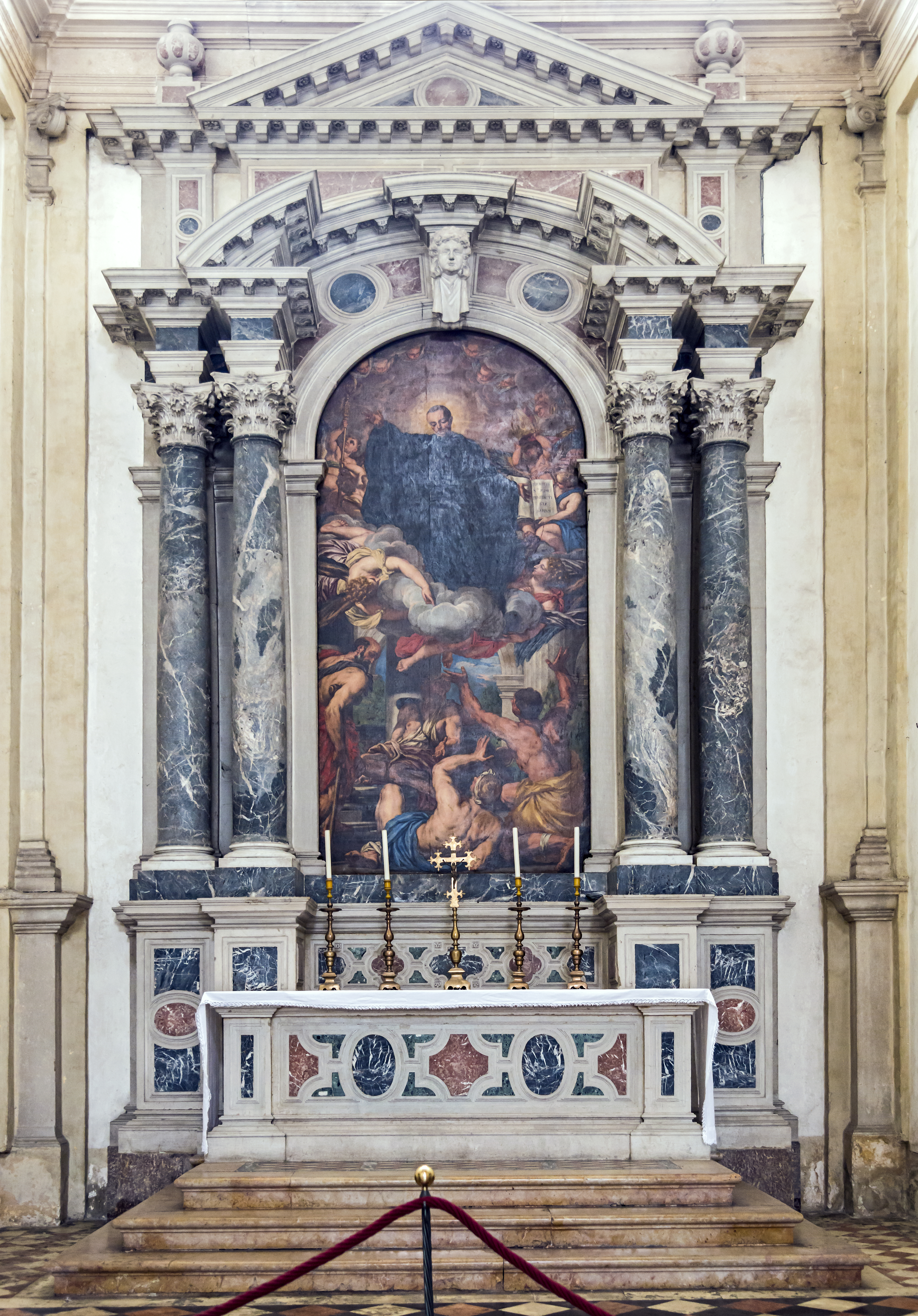
Chapel of Saint Maurus

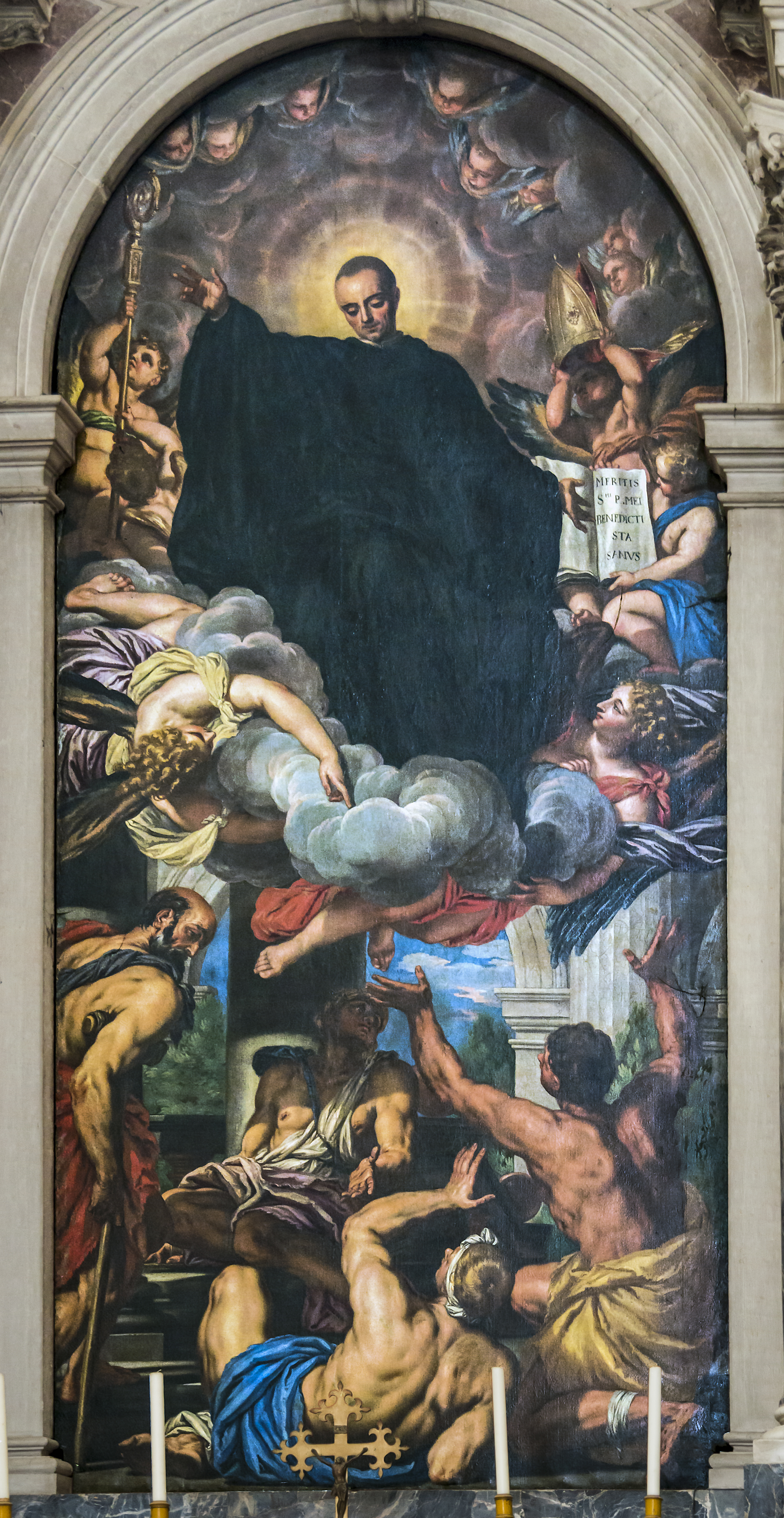
"Saint Maurus invoked by the sick" by Valentin Le Febre

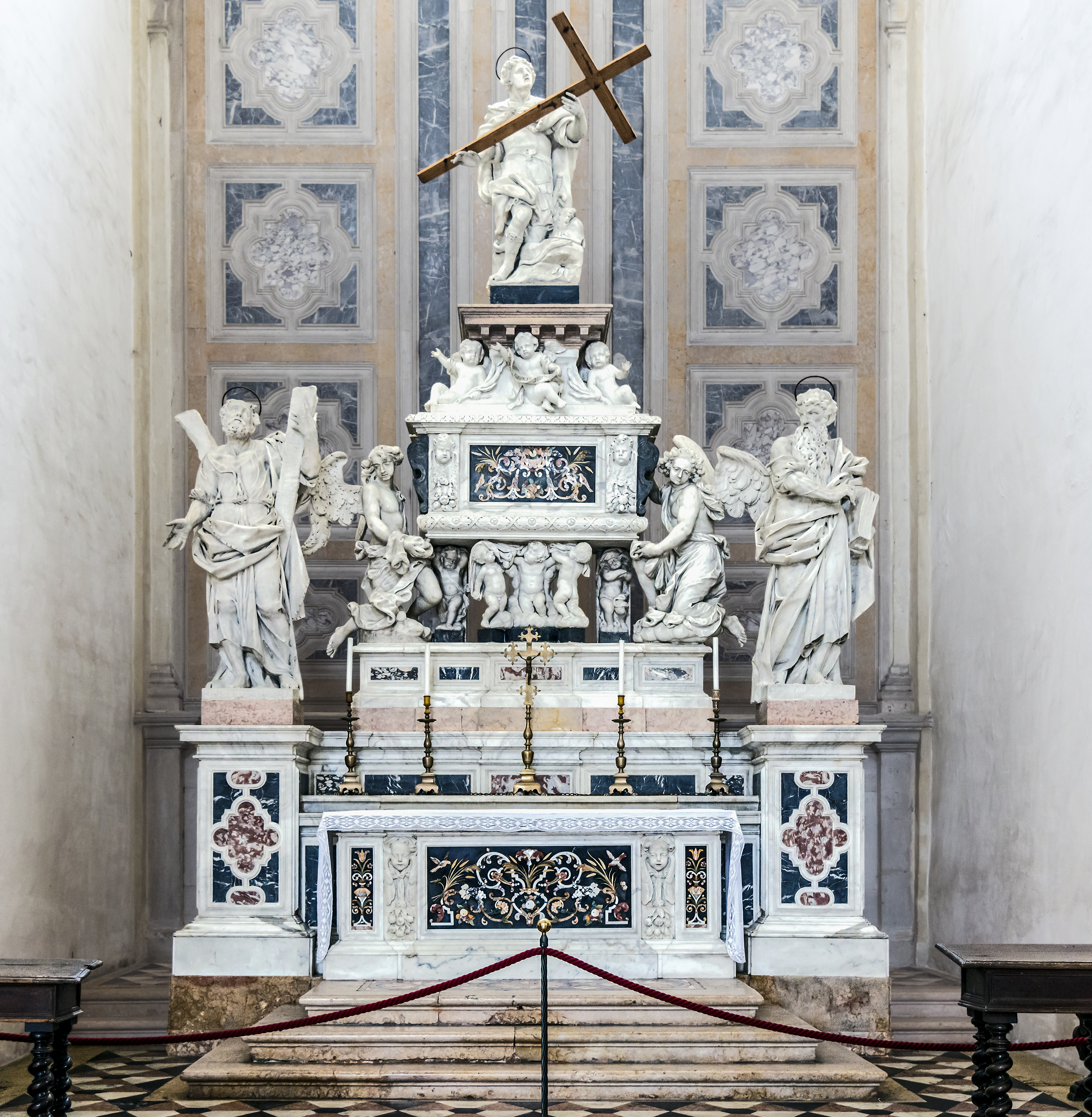
Chapel of Saint Julian

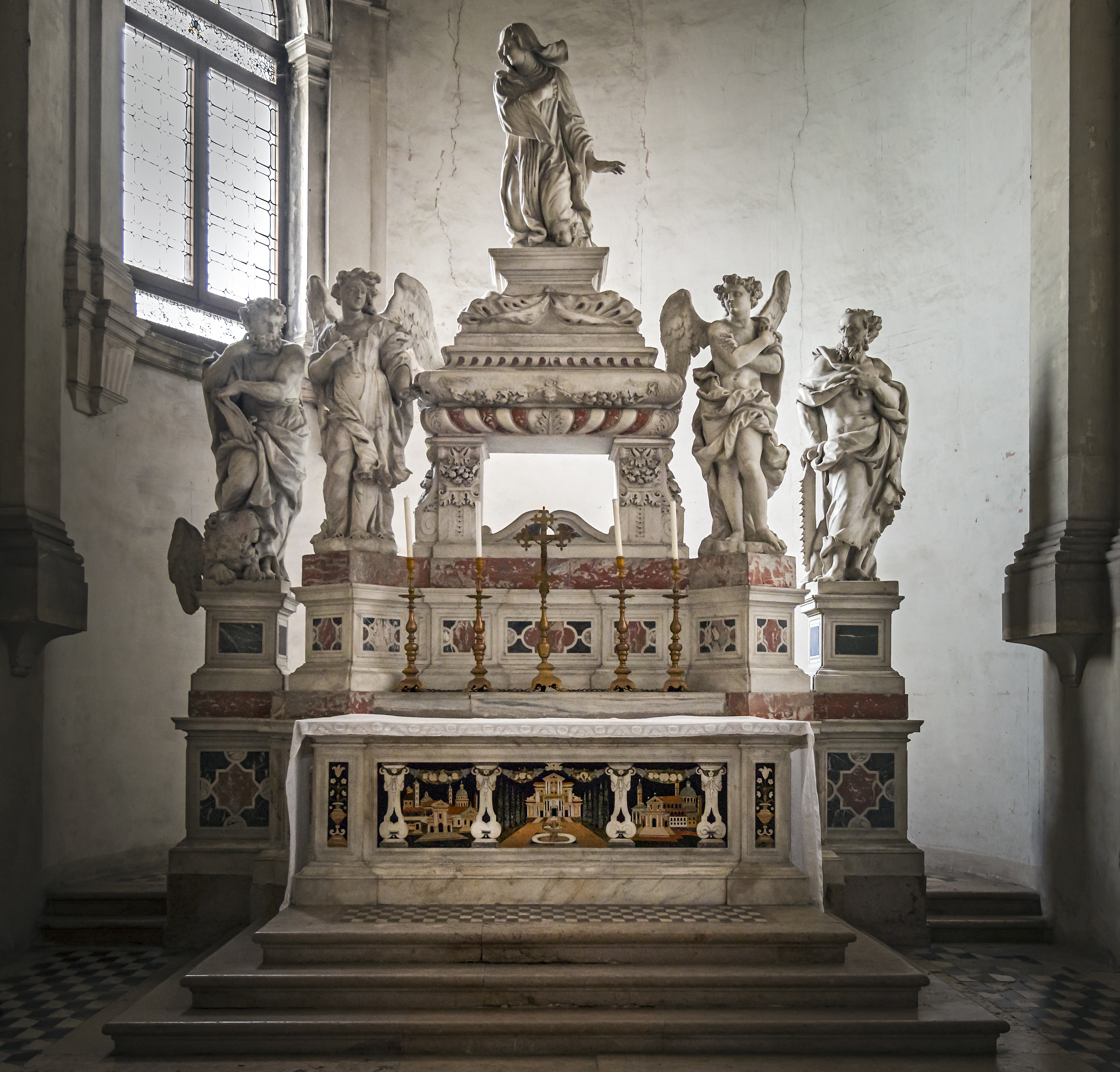
Chapel of Saint Felicity

==== Left Transept ====
Cappella di San Luca

The large chapel was reorganized for the liturgical adaptations implemented in the years of the Second Vatican Council. In the center, a 1313 monument that houses the relics of St. Luke the Evangelist, commissioned by the Abbot Gualpertino Mussato and originally erected in the Gothic chapel in 1562. The monument is made of serpentine and marble of Verona. It is enriched with eight alabaster panels carved in bas-relief depicting angels and symbols related to the saint. The whole rests on two granite columns, two alabaster spiral columns and the center is placed on a support in Greek marble, representing caryatid angels, supporting the whole. The 16th-century altar, today displaced, served as a base for the monument. A modern wooden choir surrounds the altar. At the top is placed the sixteenth-century version – attributed to Alessandro Bonvicino – of the Virgin Salus Populi Patavini Constantinople. It is framed and supported by the bronze angels of Hamlet Sartori (1960–1961). The Byzantine icon of origin, according to tradition, painted by Saint Luke and brought to Padua to save from the iconoclastic fury of Constantinople, is now in a sanctuary in the monastery.

Capella Beato Arnaldo da Limena

The chapel is dedicated to Blessed Arnaud Cataneo (Arnaldo da Limena). The altar was erected in 1681: Bernardo Falcone sculpted the angels and the statue placed above the urn that houses the relics of Blessed Arnaud. The lateral statues of Saints Peter and St Paul are works of Orazio Marinali and Michele Fabris. The work of marquetry of polychrome stones of the altar is the work of the Corbarelli family.

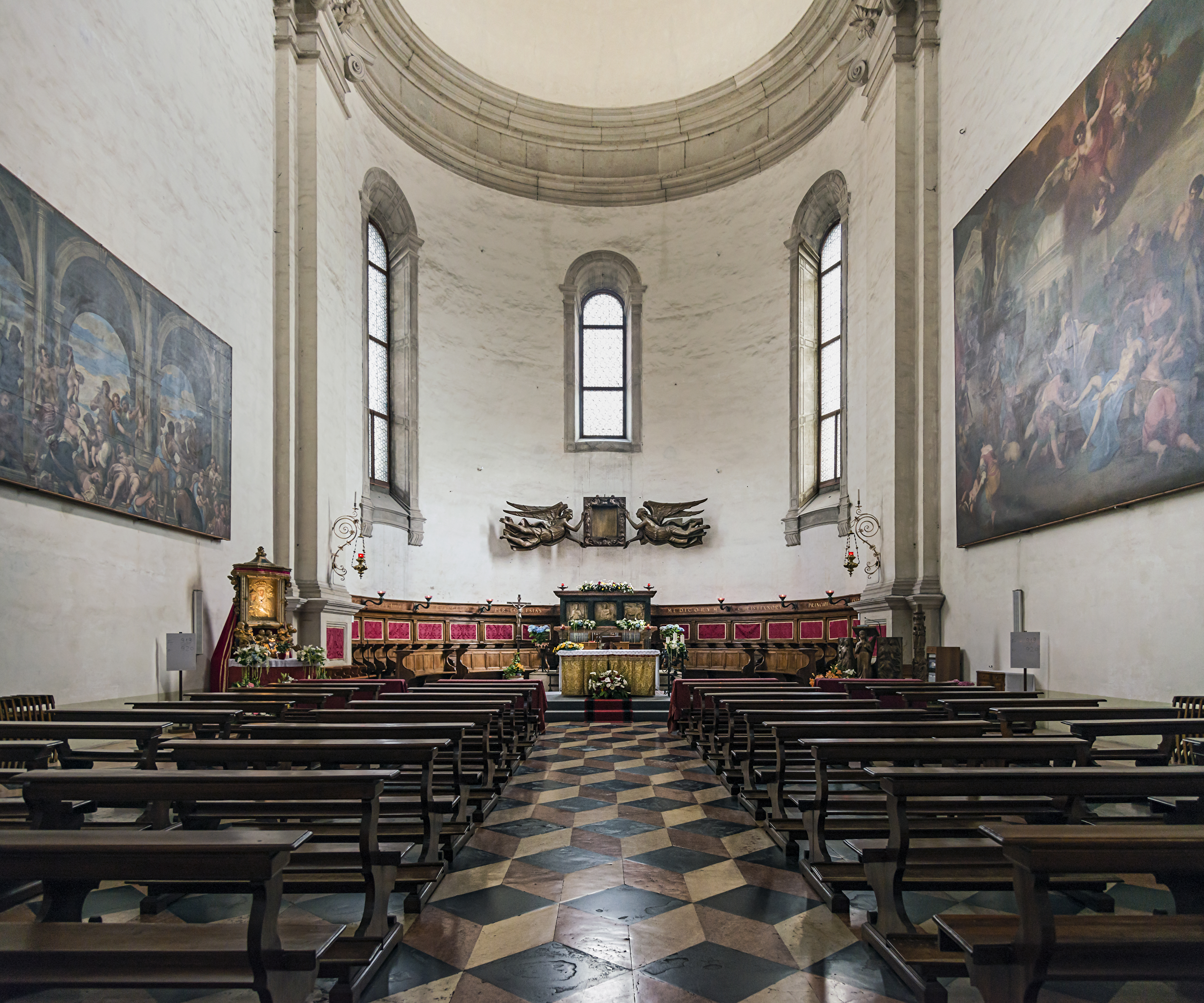
Chapel of Saint Luke

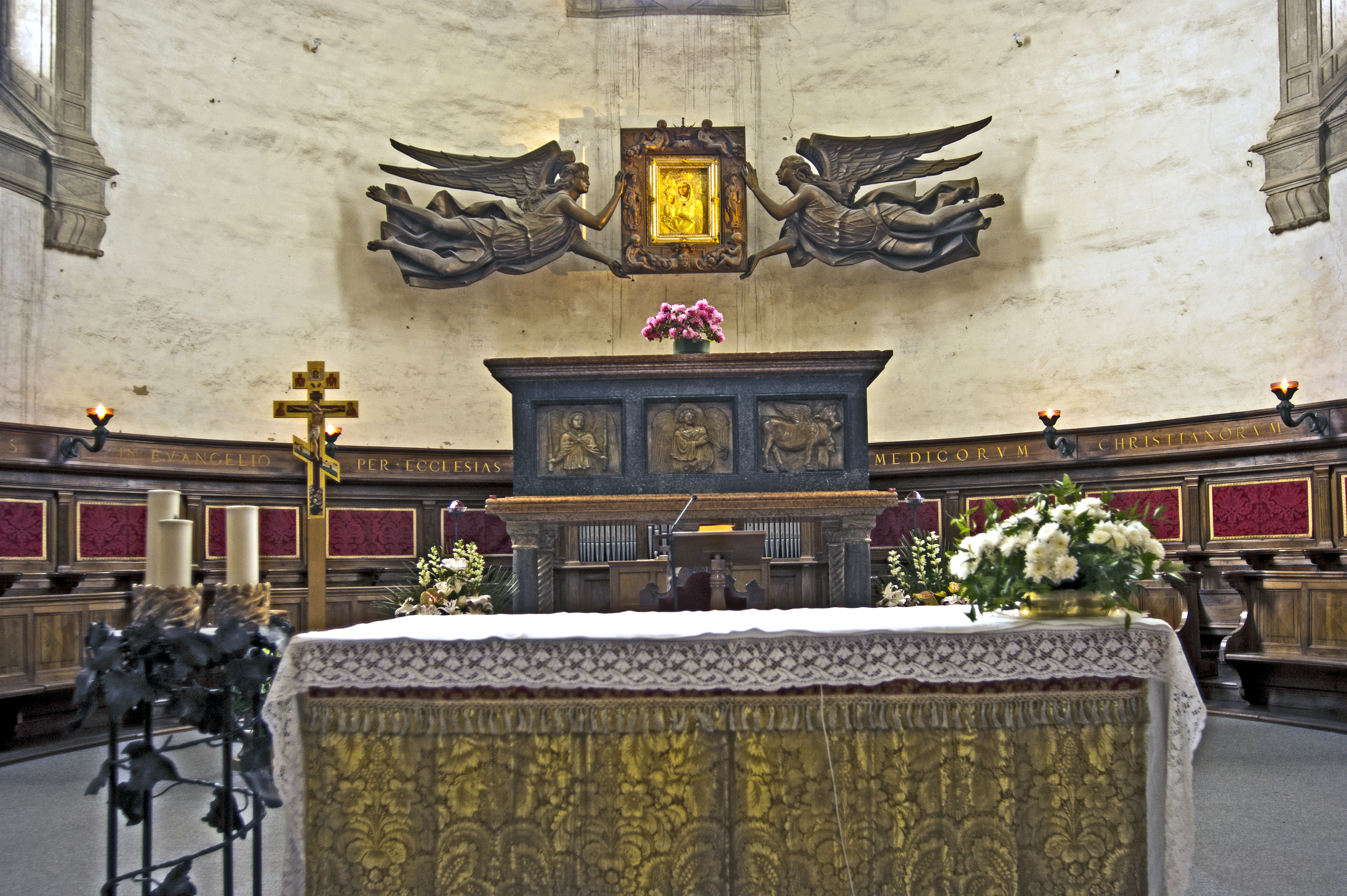
Altar and Reliquary of St. Luke the Evangelist

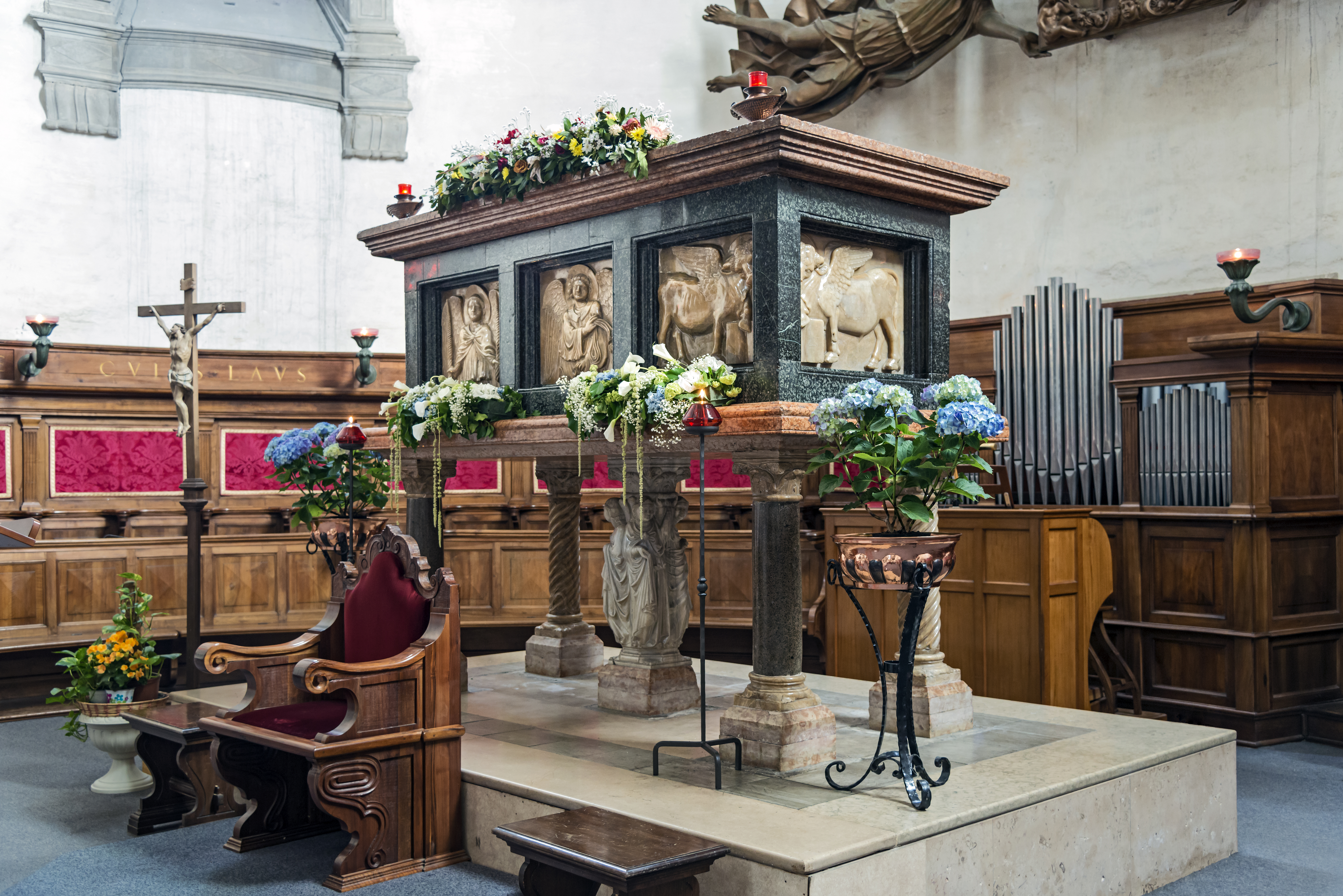
Reliquary of St. Luke the Evangelist and transept organ

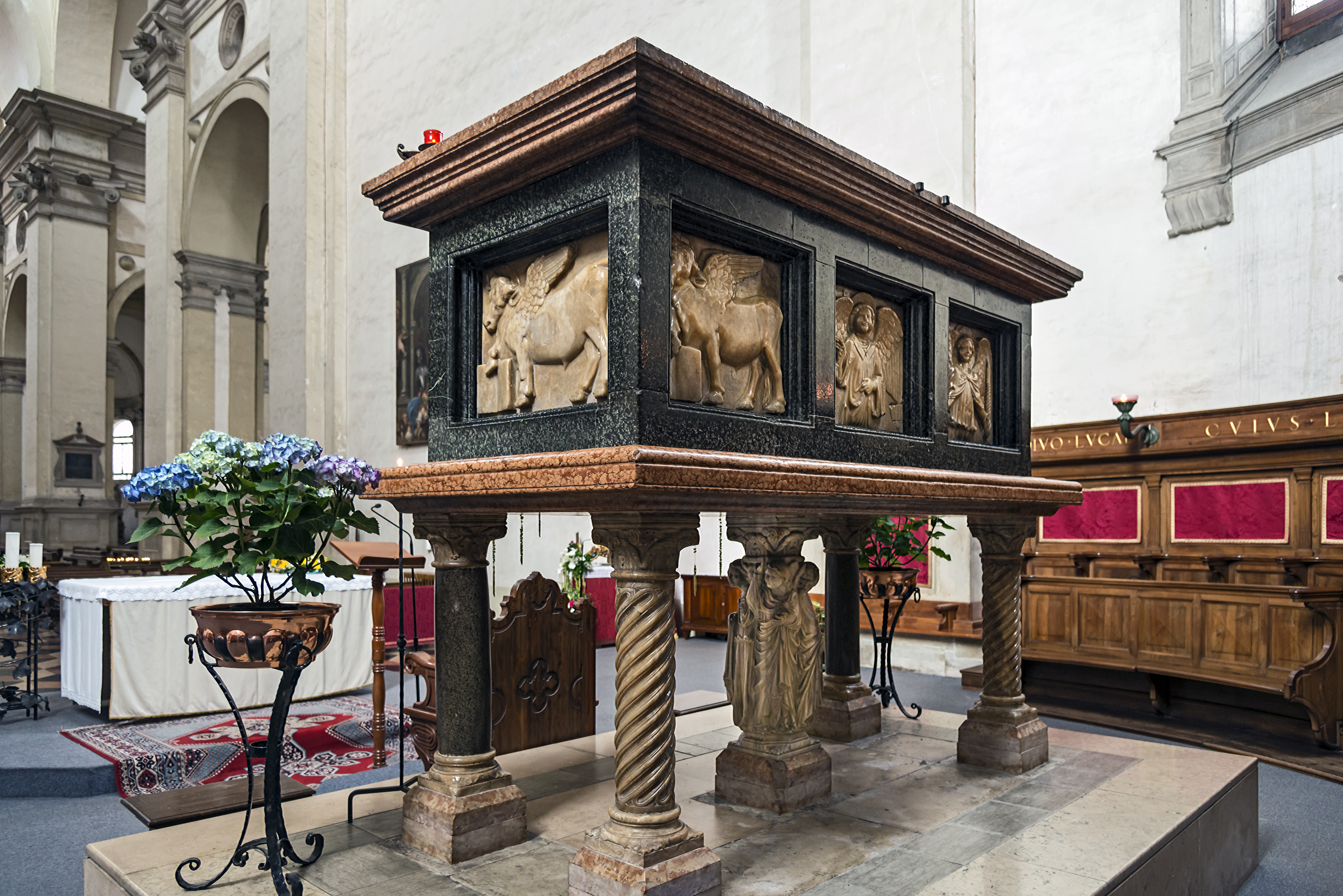
Reliquary of St. Luke the Evangelist (rear)

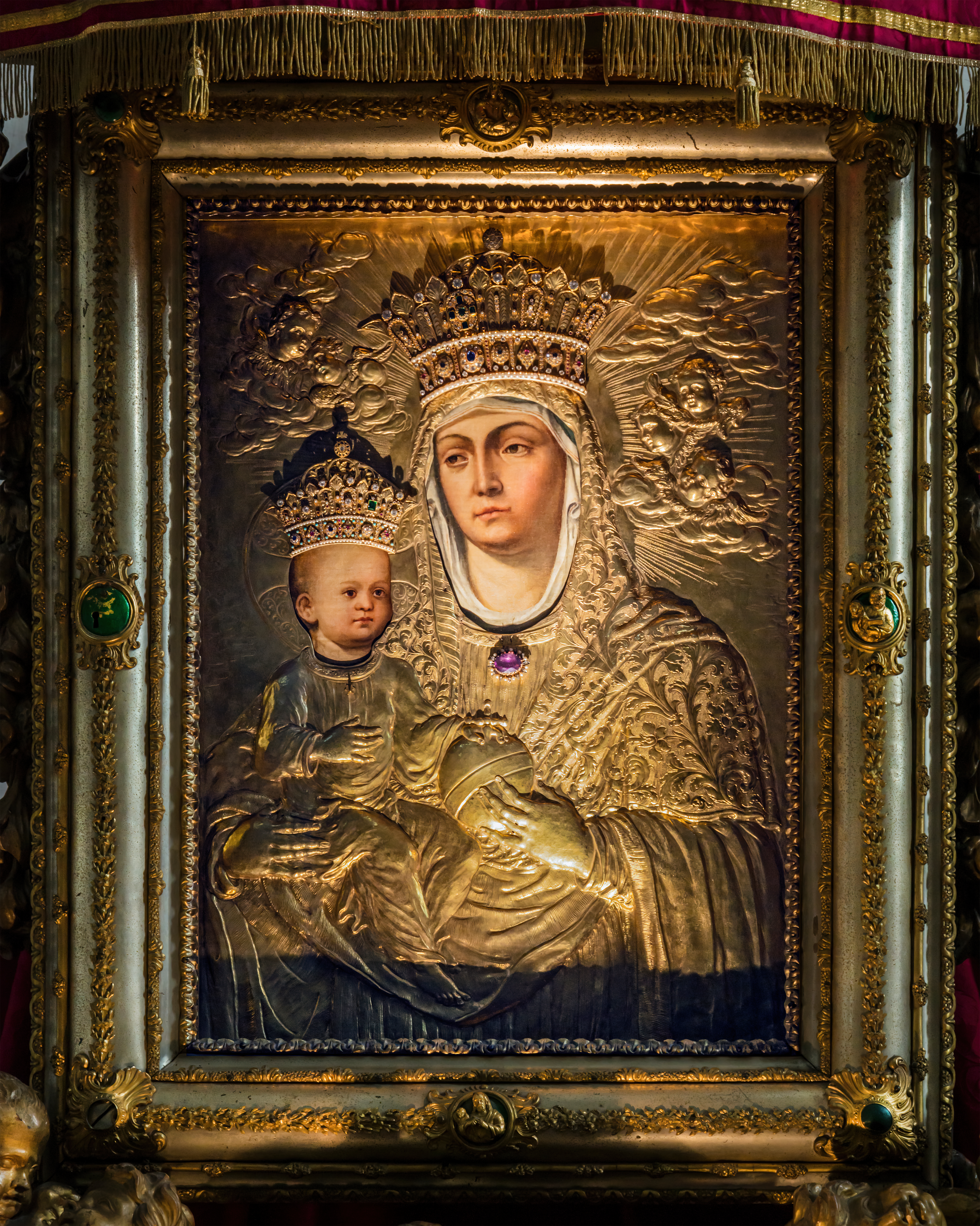
Madonna of Constantinople Sixteenth-century version

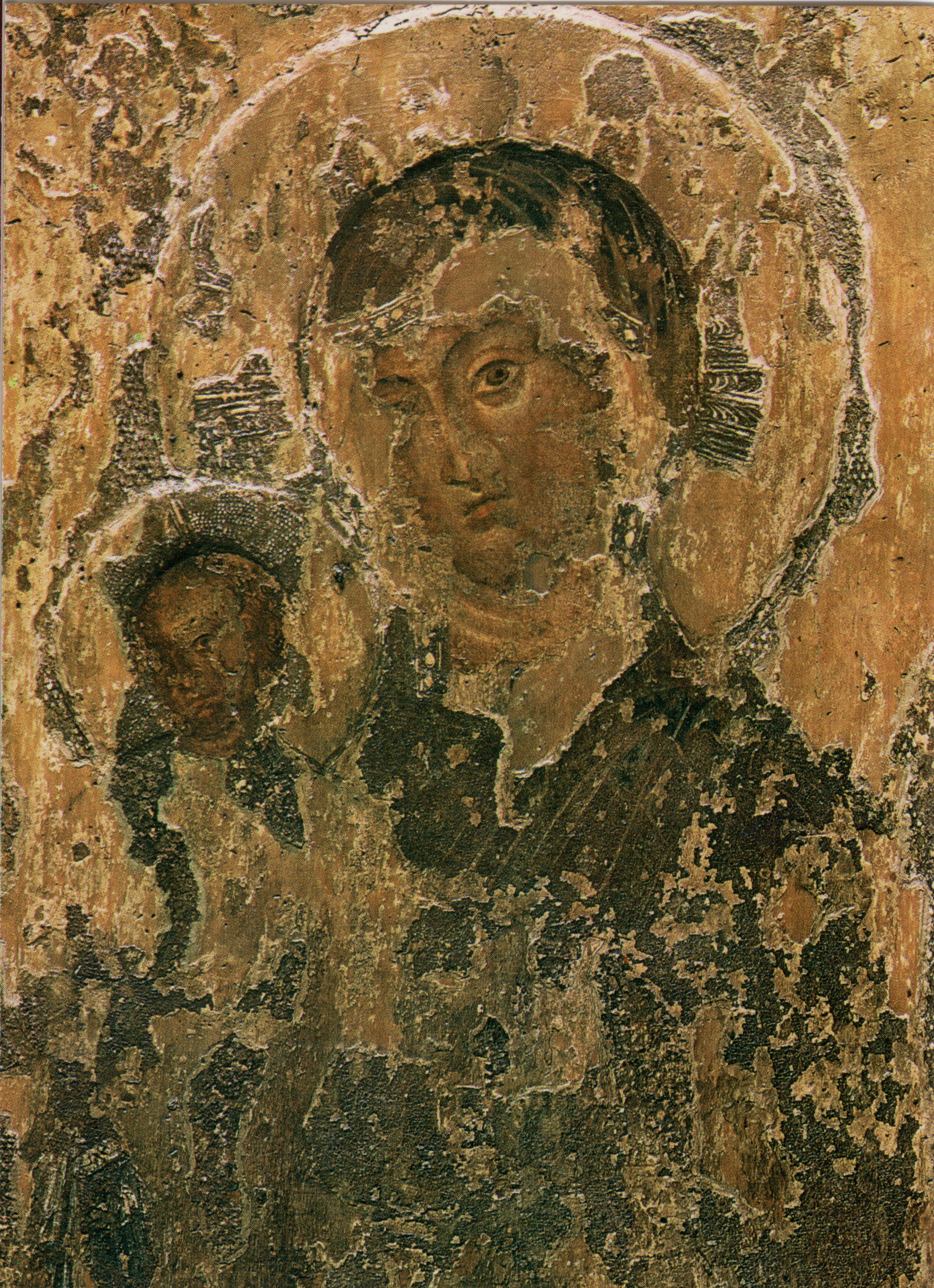
''Madonna of Constantinople original version

On the large wall on the right, there is a large canvas by Antonio Balestra (1718) depicting the martyrdom of Saints Cosmas and Damian. Opposite, on the left wall, The Great Massacre of the Innocents by Sebastiano Galvano, signed by the mid-sixteenth century. Initially this work was in the church of San Benedetto Novello.

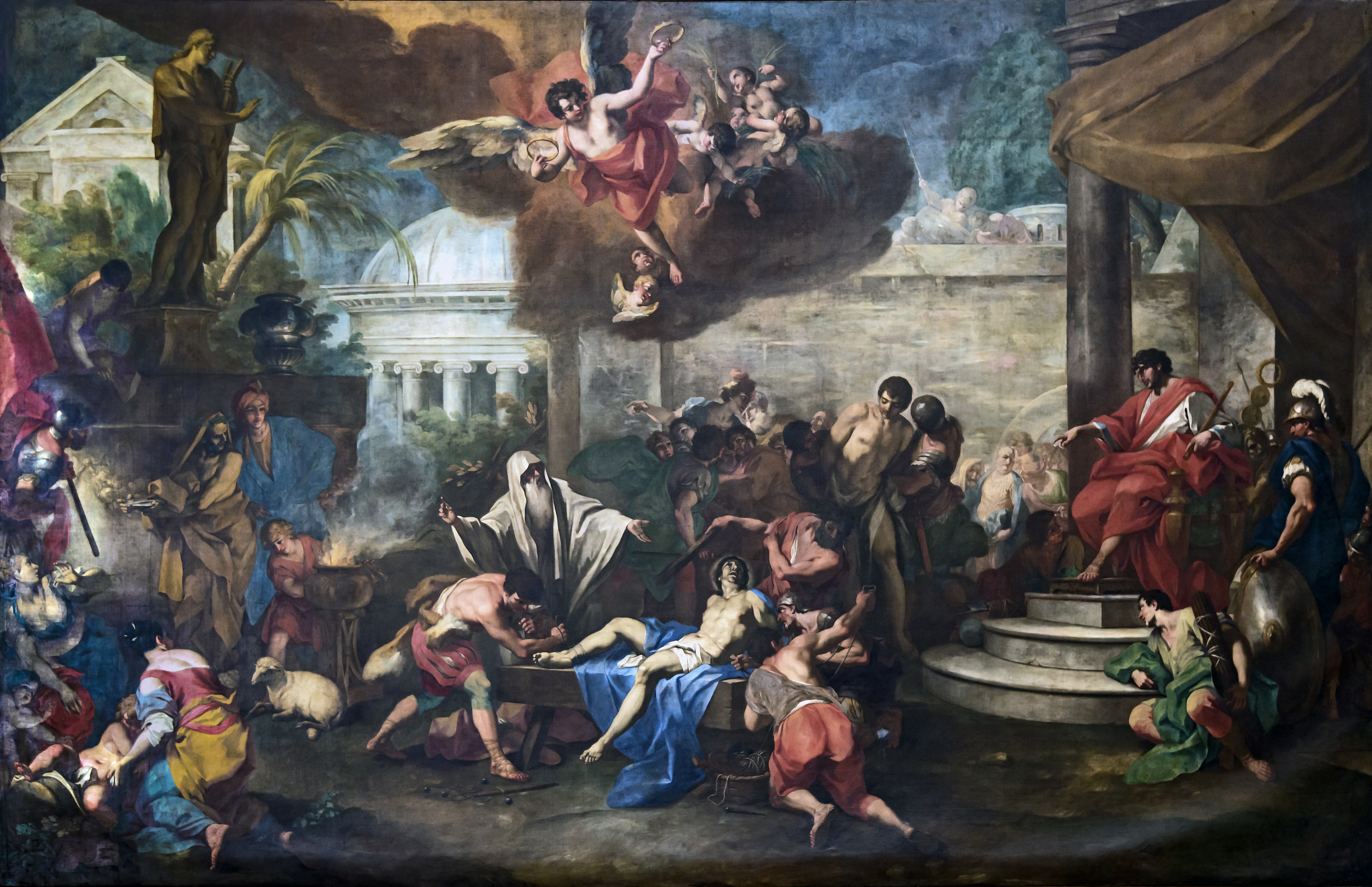
Martyrdom of Saints Cosmas & Damian by Balestra

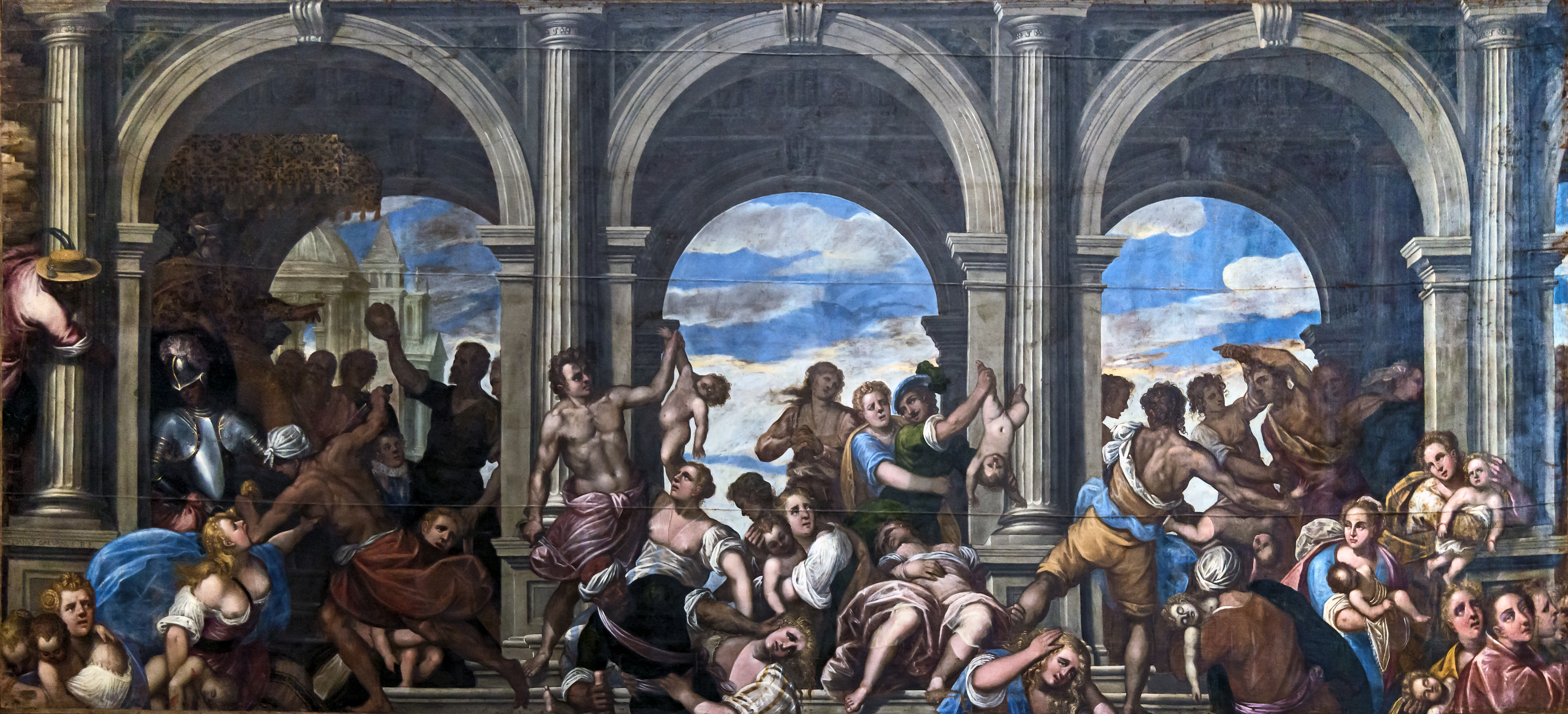
Massacre of the Innocents by Galvano

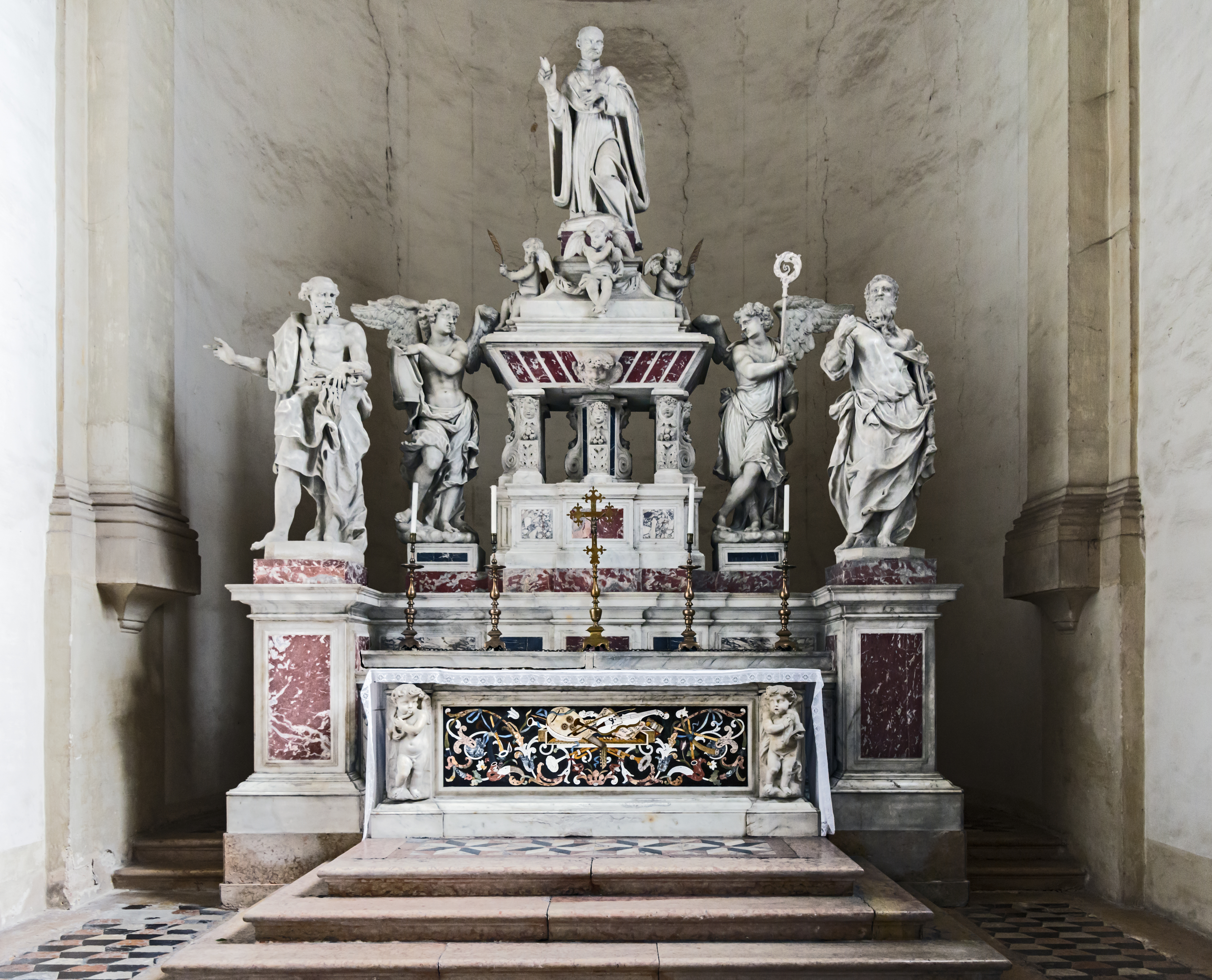
Chapel to Blessed Arnaud Cataneo (Arnaldo da Limena)

=== The Choir ===
La Cappella del Santissimo Sacramento

The chapel is dedicated to the Blessed Sacrament. Before hosting the Blessed Sacrament, the chapel contained the relics of the Innocent Saints. The ceiling is decorated with frescoes depicting angels and apostles worshiping the Blessed Sacrament. The work is by Sebastiano Ricci made around 1700; It is characterized by the use of the trompe l'oeil. The vault above the altar is occupied by the representation of the Eternal Father, preceded by the Apostles, represented as if placed above the walls of the chapel, and attracted by the Eucharist carried in triumph by An angelic crowd.

The altar is a work made in several times in the forties of the seventeenth century. The design is by Lorenzo Bedogni by Pietro Paolo Corbarelli and their sons Simone, Antonio and Francesco around 1656. It was completed in 1674 by Giuseppe Sardi and Josse the Court who fashioned the two angels worshipers while the bronze statues on the Tabernacle were cast Carlo Trabucco (1697). The other sculptures are by Michele and Alessandro Fabris Tremignon.

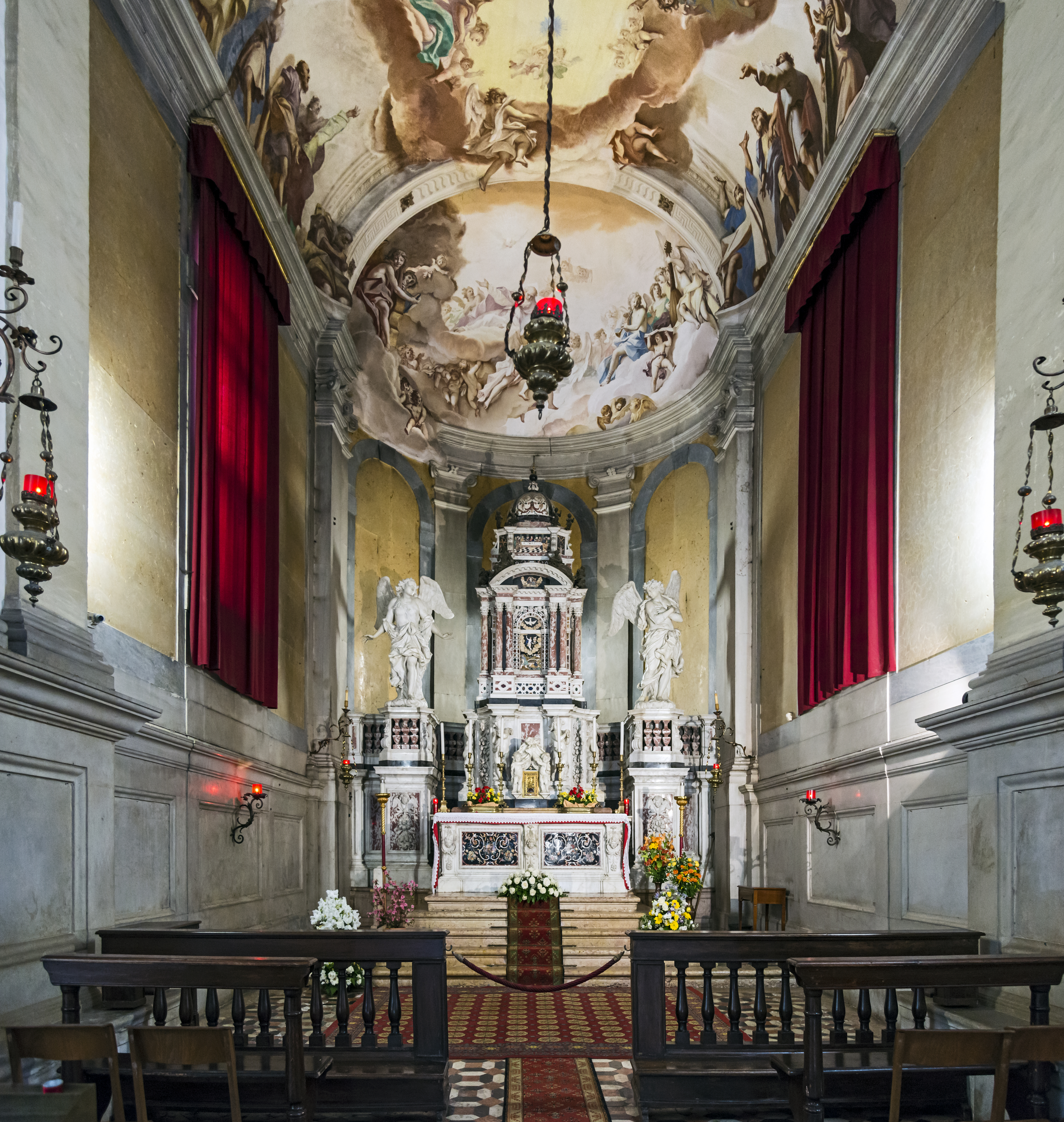
Chapel of the Blessed Sacrament

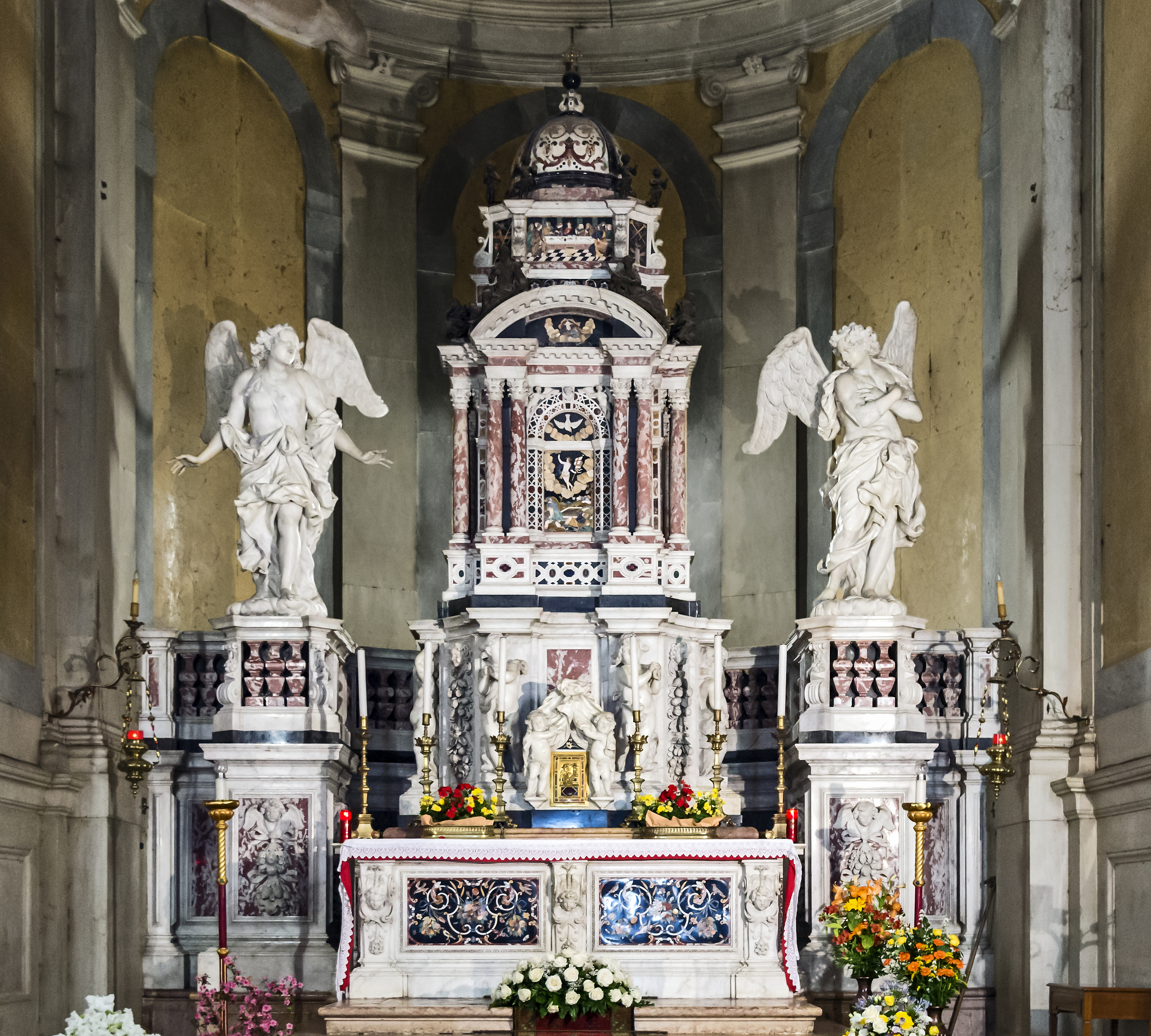
Chapel to the Blessed Sacrament – altar

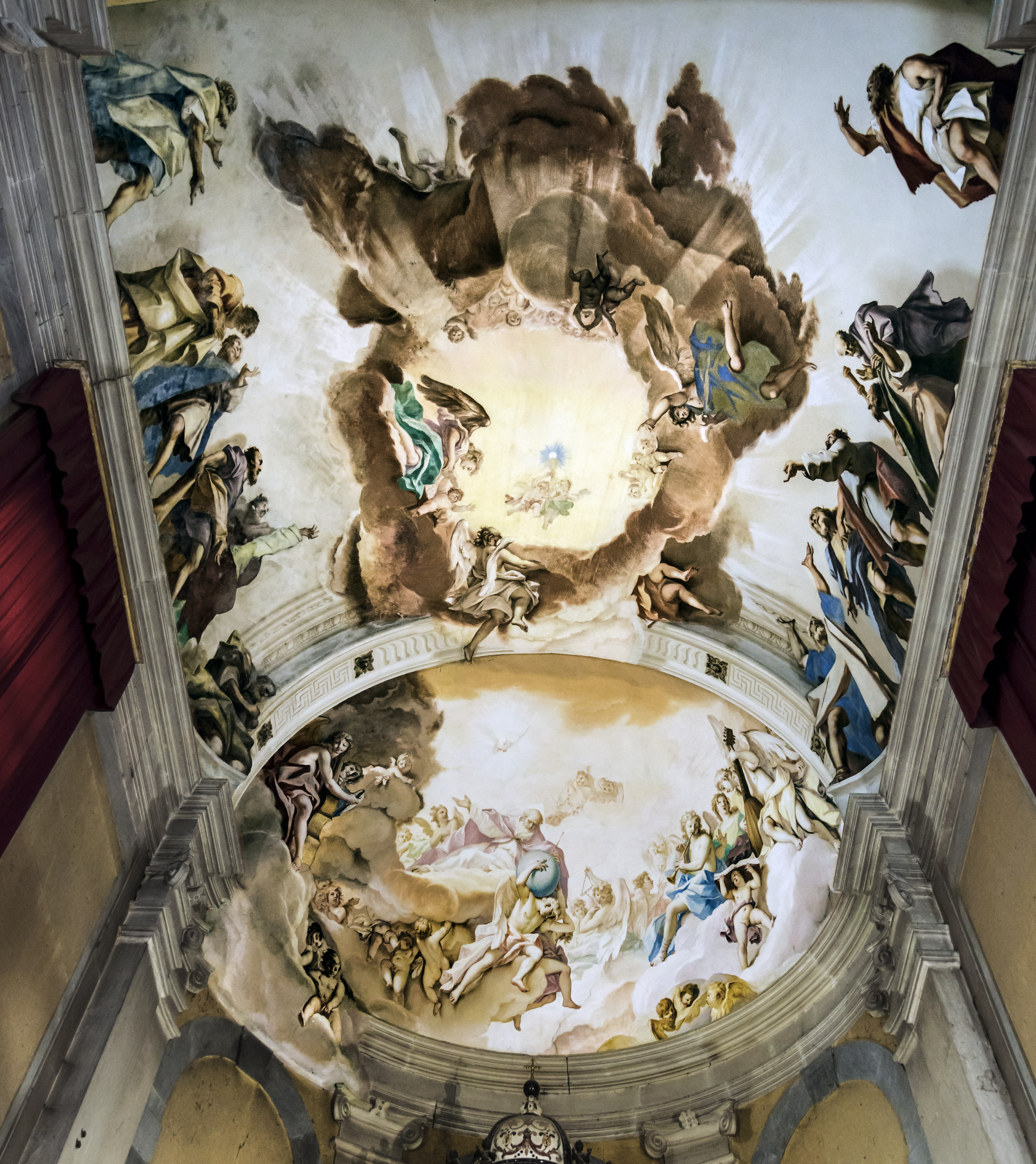
Chapel to the Blessed Sacrament – ceiling

==== The choir ====
It is elevated in relation to the rest of the building and is accessible by a monumental staircase. Below is a large crypt, now a winter chapel. The balustrades are the work of Francesco Contini (1630). On the sides, at the top, niches inside, two busts that ideally represent the two Roman patricians Vitaliano (right) and Opilione (left) works of Giovanni Francesco de Surdis of 1561.

==== The high altar ====
Decorated with "Florentine" combining fine inlays of marble on which are placed pieces of mother-of-pearl, coral, lapis lazuli, carnelian, pearls and other precious materials. The delicate work was carried out between 1637 and 1643 by Pietro Paolo Corbarelli designed by Giovan Battista Nigetti, brother of the famous Matteo Nigetti. On 7 October 1627, with great pomp, the body of Saint Justine was placed under the altar. The painting of the altarpiece The martyrdom of Saint Justine by Paolo Veronese oil on canvas from 1576.

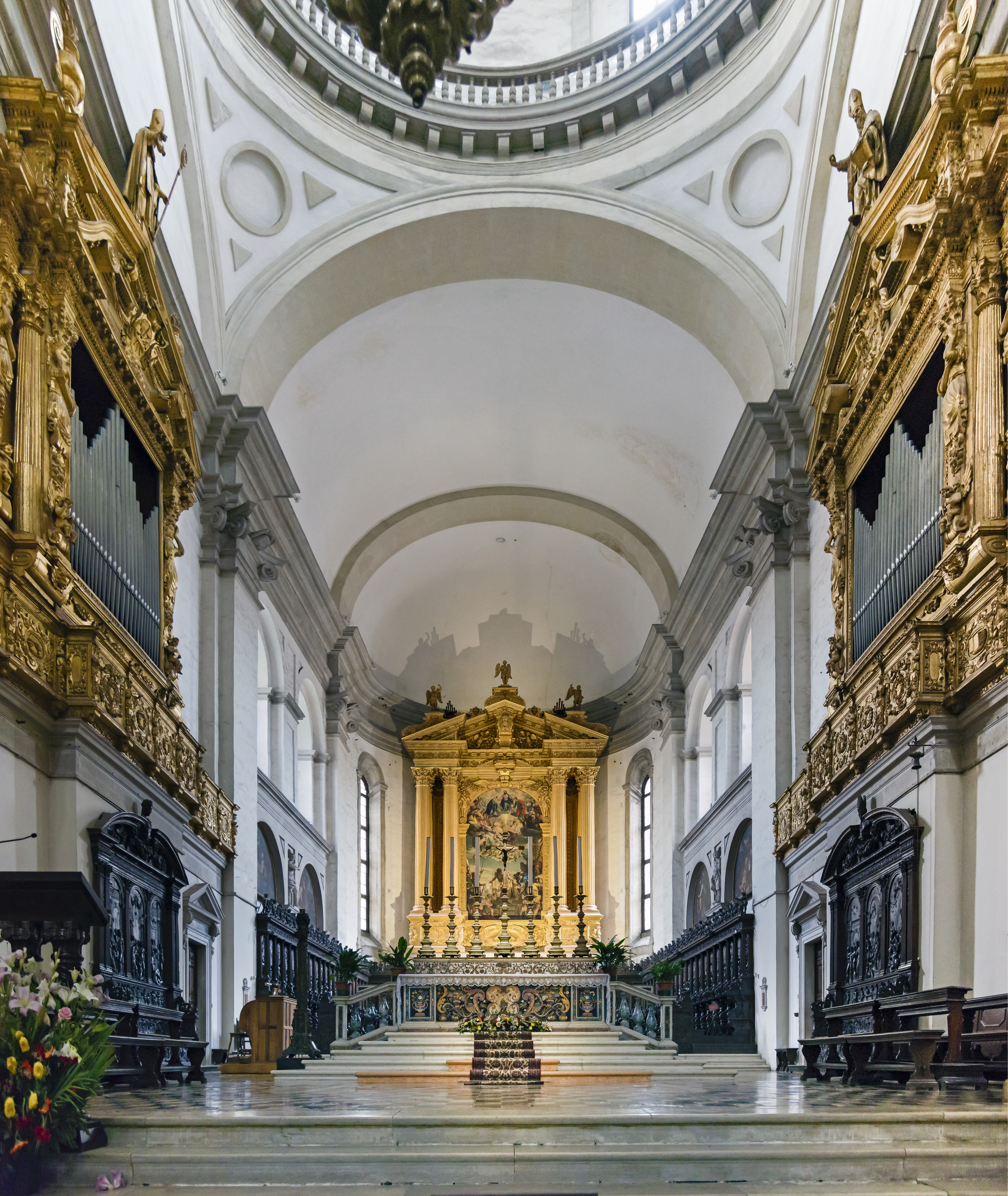
Choir and High Altar

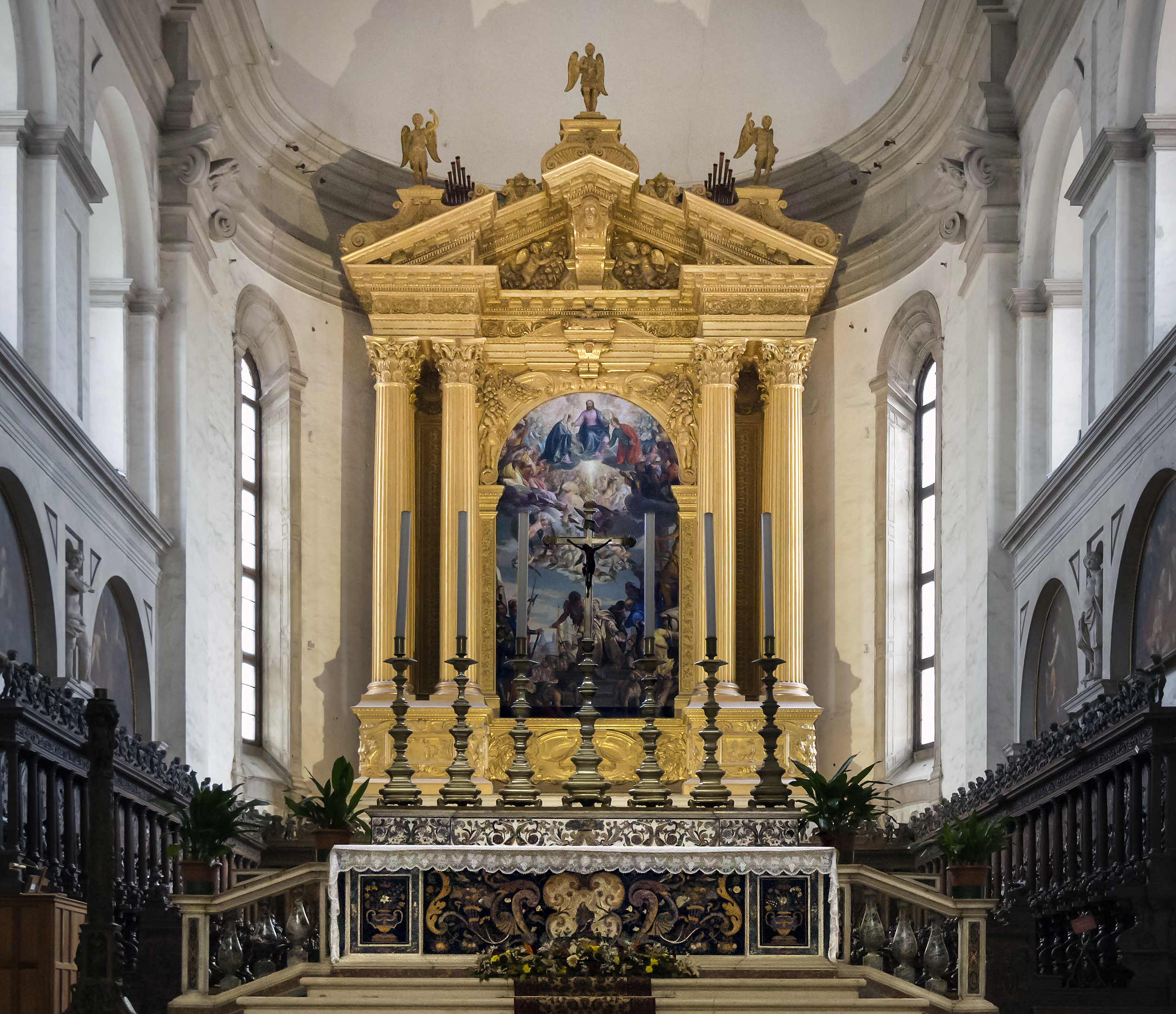
High Altar

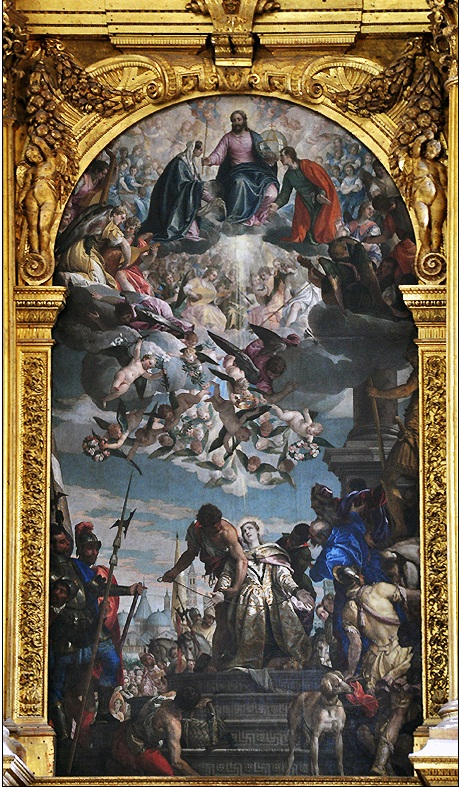
The martyrdom of Saint Justine by Veronese

==== Cappella della Pietà ====
The chapel is the work of Genoese artist Filippo Parodi in 1689. The artist took charge of the architectural, decorative and sculptural design including the ceiling, adorned by an angelic stucco crowd. In the center is the Pietà, surrounded by two statues of Mary Magdalene and John the Apostle.

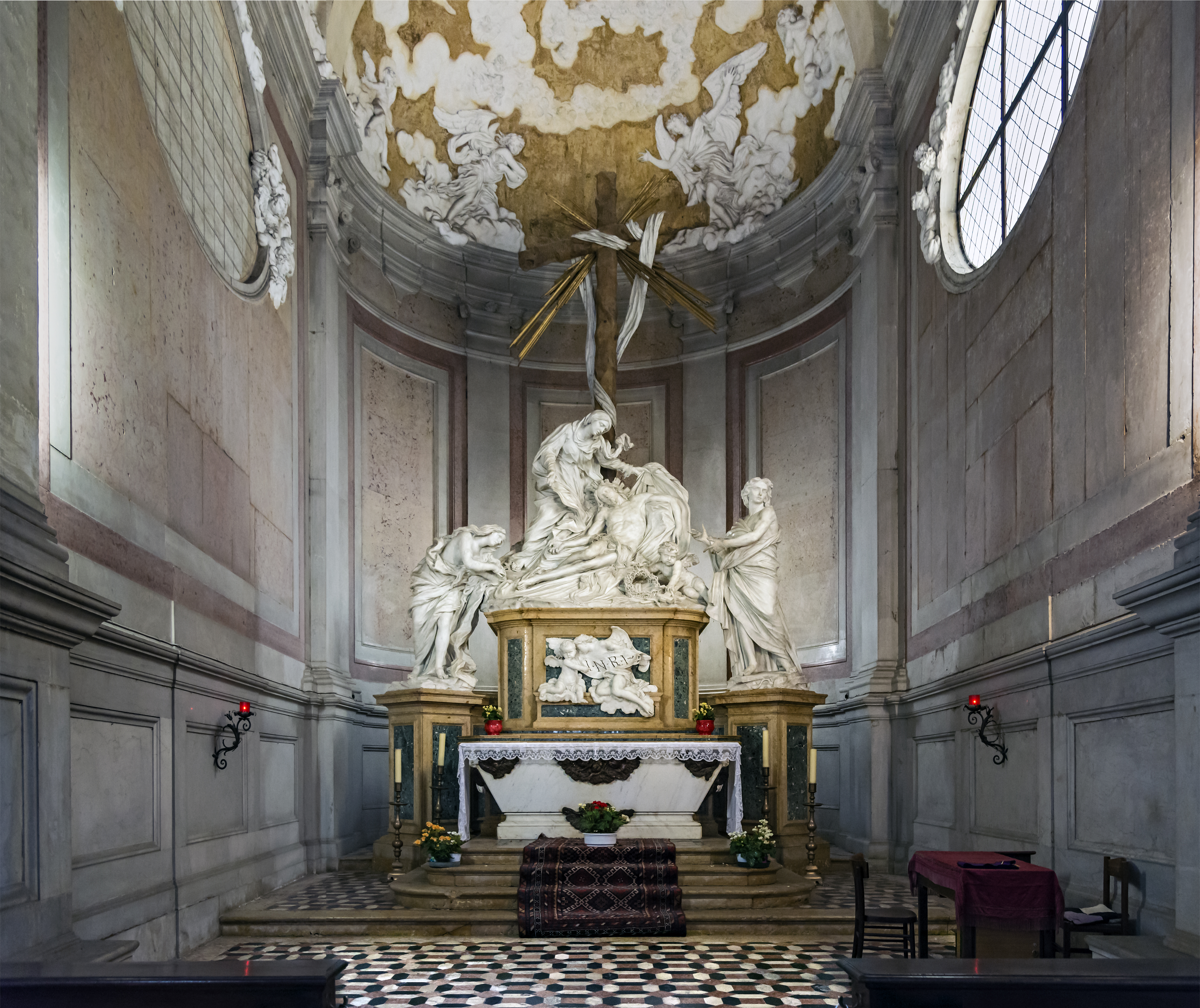
Chapel of La Pieta

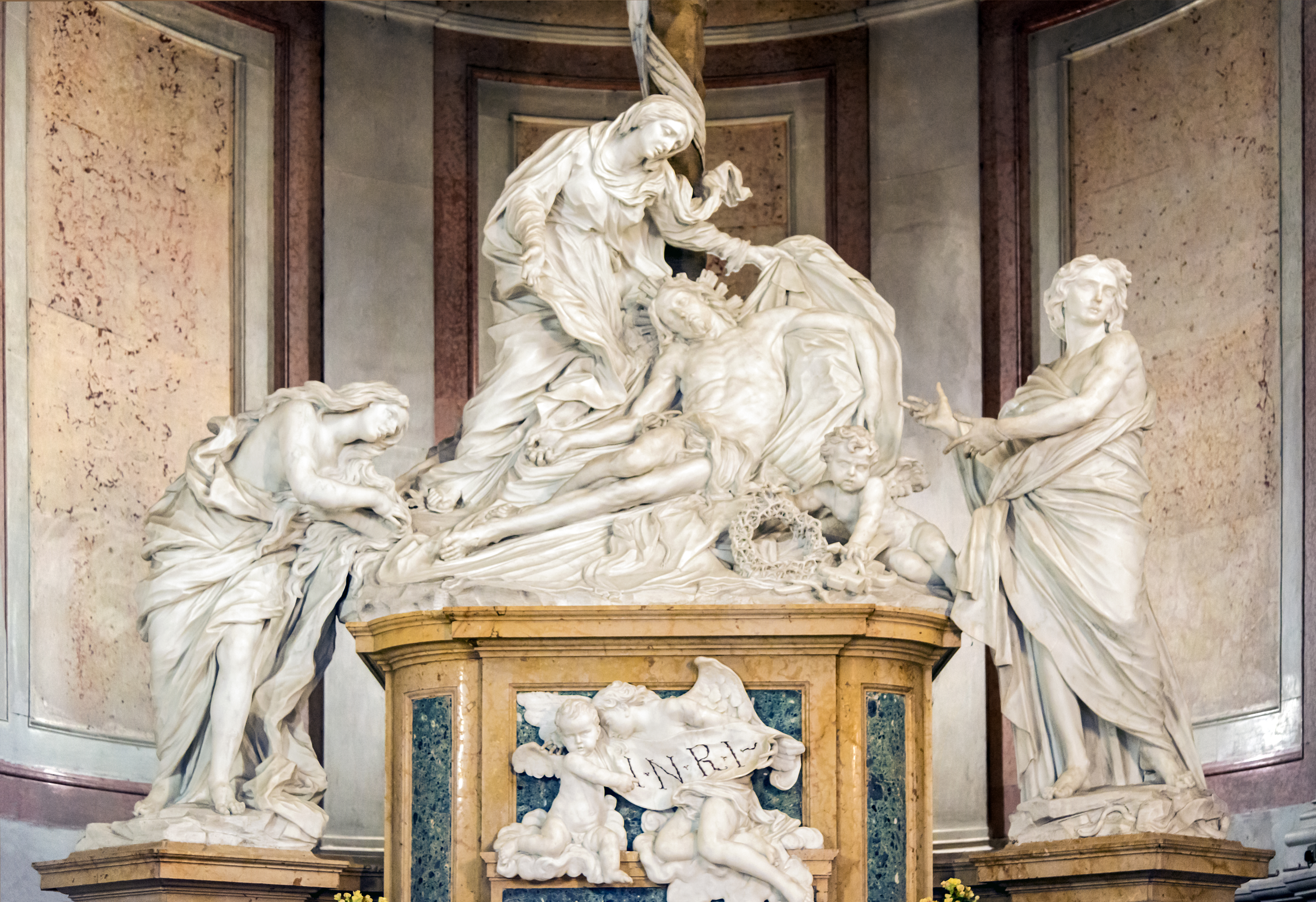
Pieta by Filippo Parodi

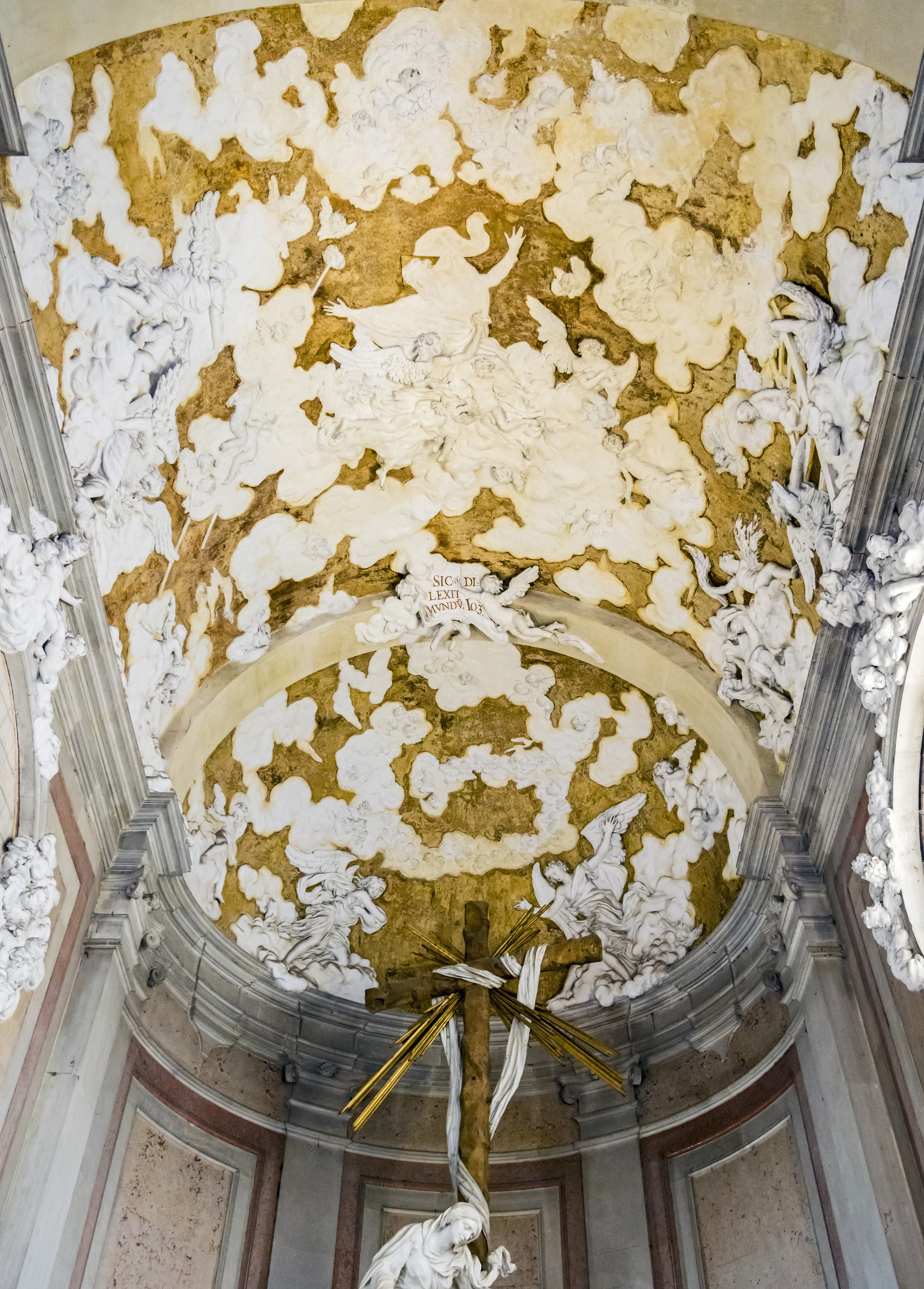
Ceiling

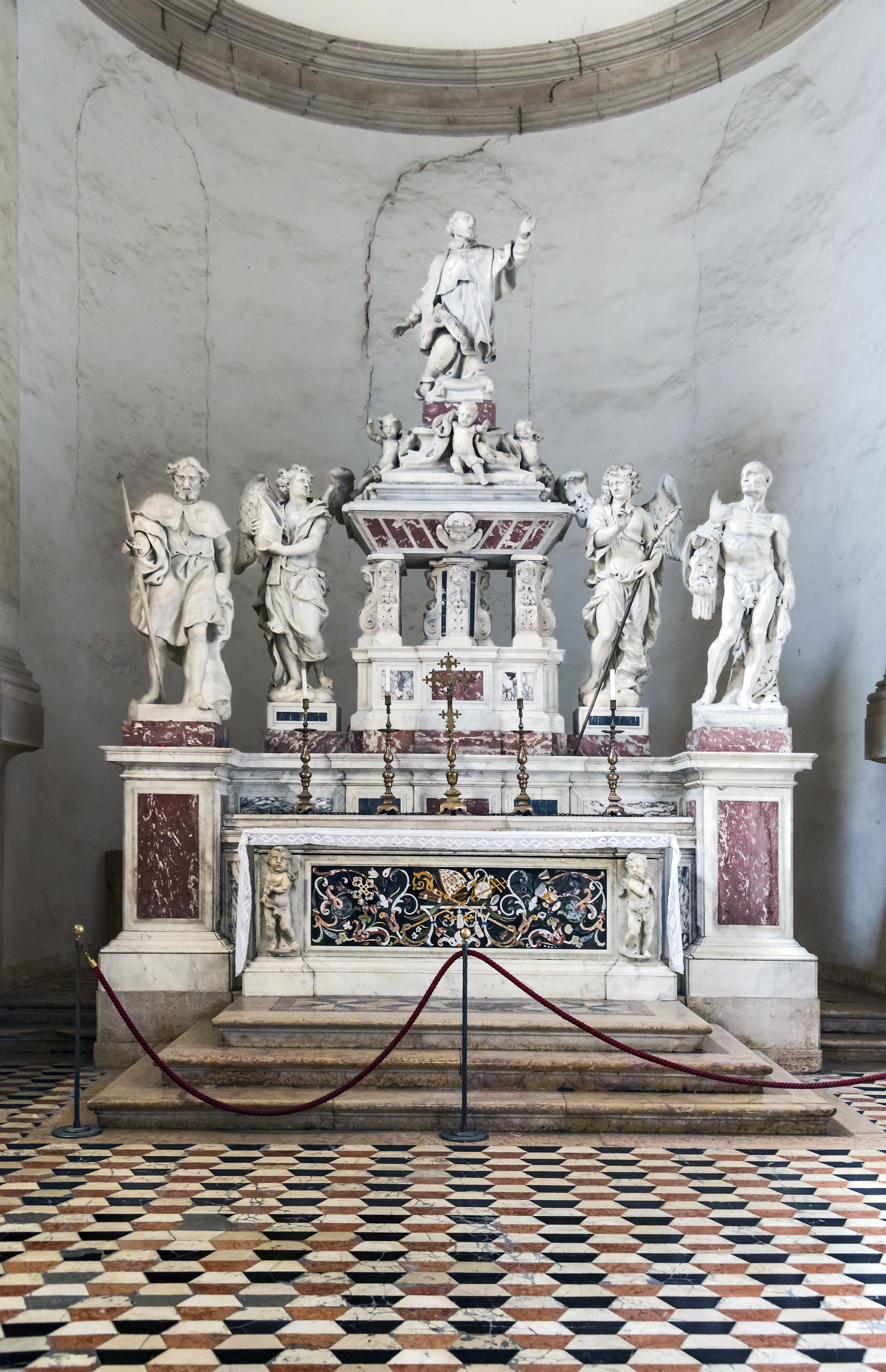
Chapel of saint Maximus of Padua

==== Right transept ====
Chapel of Saint Maxime of Padua

The altar houses the tomb containing the remains of the second bishop of Padua, Saint Maximus. The statue group: saint maxime, the angels who hold the insignia of the bishop and saint James is the work of Michele Fabris (1681), while the statue of St. Bartholomew is the result of the scissors of Bernardo Falcone (1682). The altar in marquetry of polychrome stone, is the work of the Corbarelli family.

Chapel of Saint Matthias

The great space is dominated by two imposing canvases: on the right The mission of the Apostles (1631) of Battista Bissoni and Saints Cosmas and Damian saved by the angel (1718) of Antonio Balestra, this one comes from the Church of the Mercy. Below the paintings are the confessionals and a pulpit from the seventeenth century. At the bottom of the chapel is a monument in Greek and African marble where the body of Saint Matthias the Apostle rests. The work is inspired by the reliquary tomb of Saint-Luc which is anterior. It was completed in 1562 by Giovanni Francesco de Surdis who carved the bas-reliefs representing the apostles. Behind the ark opens the door leading to the Martyrs' room. The 15th century vault is decorated in the style of the Renaissance. The bas-reliefs are attributed to the circle of Bartolomeo Bellano. A small alabaster temple with rich ironwork houses a representation of the virgin.

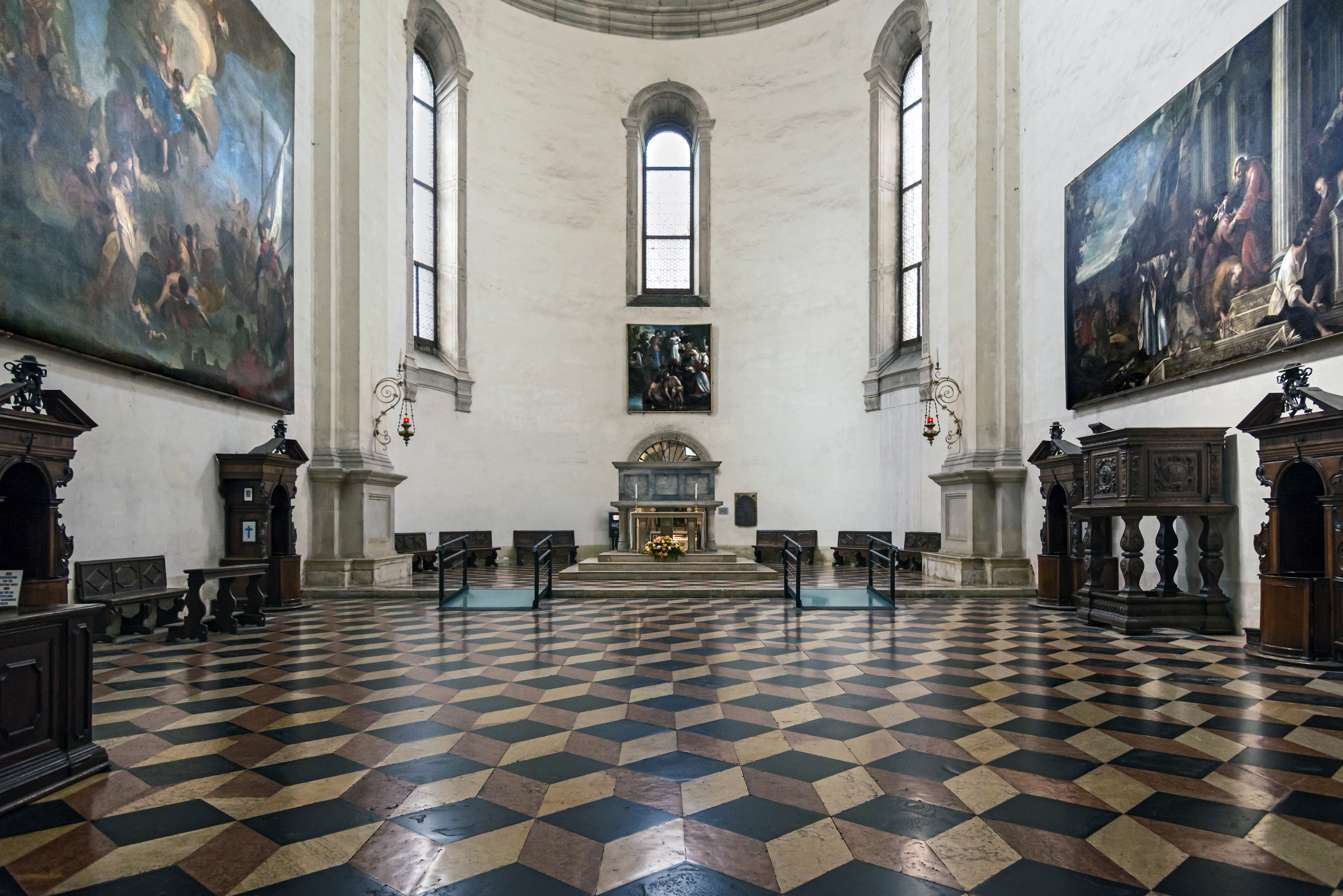
Chapel of Saint Matthias

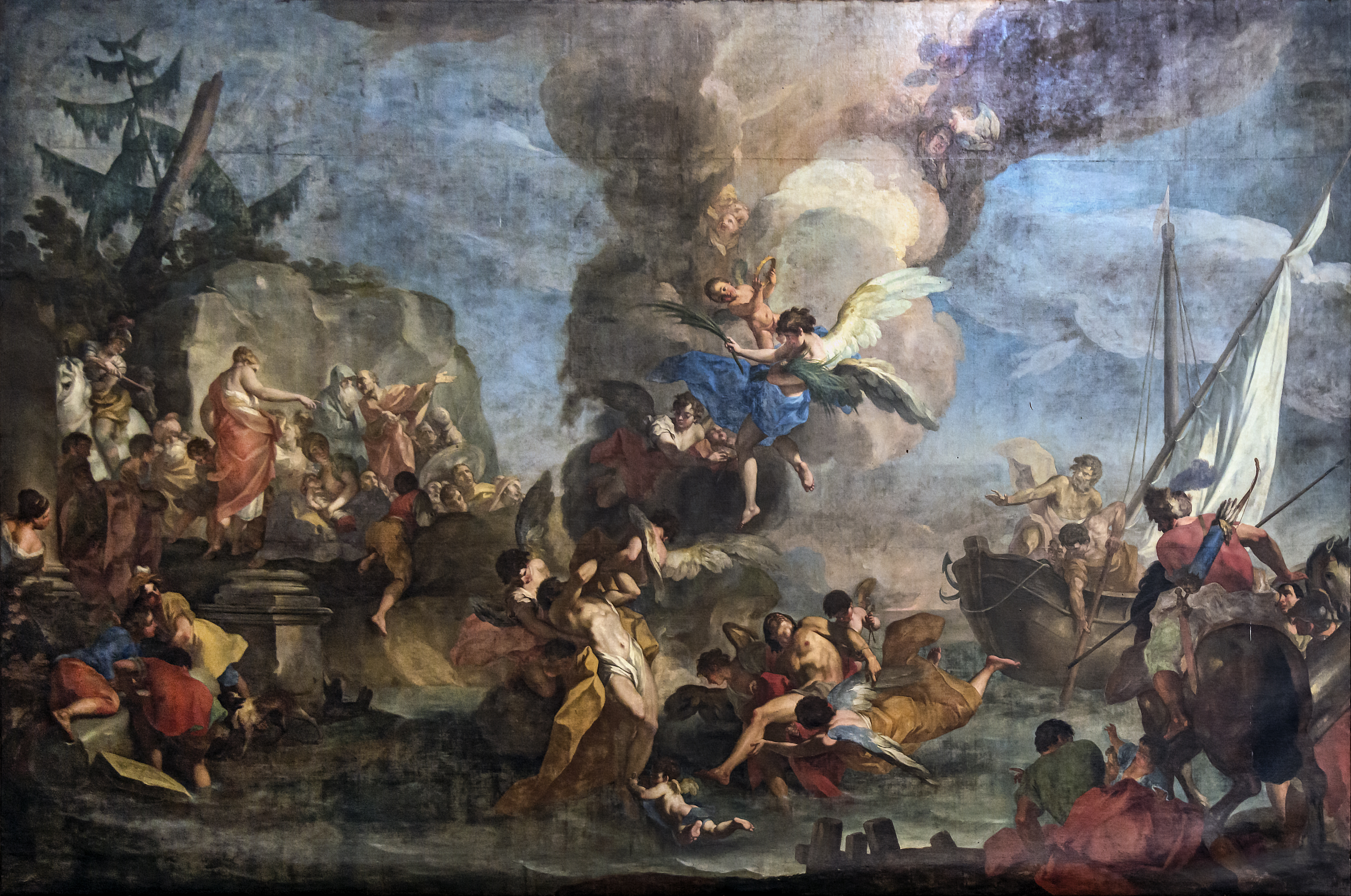
Saints Cosmas and Damian saved by the angel (1718) Antonio Balestra

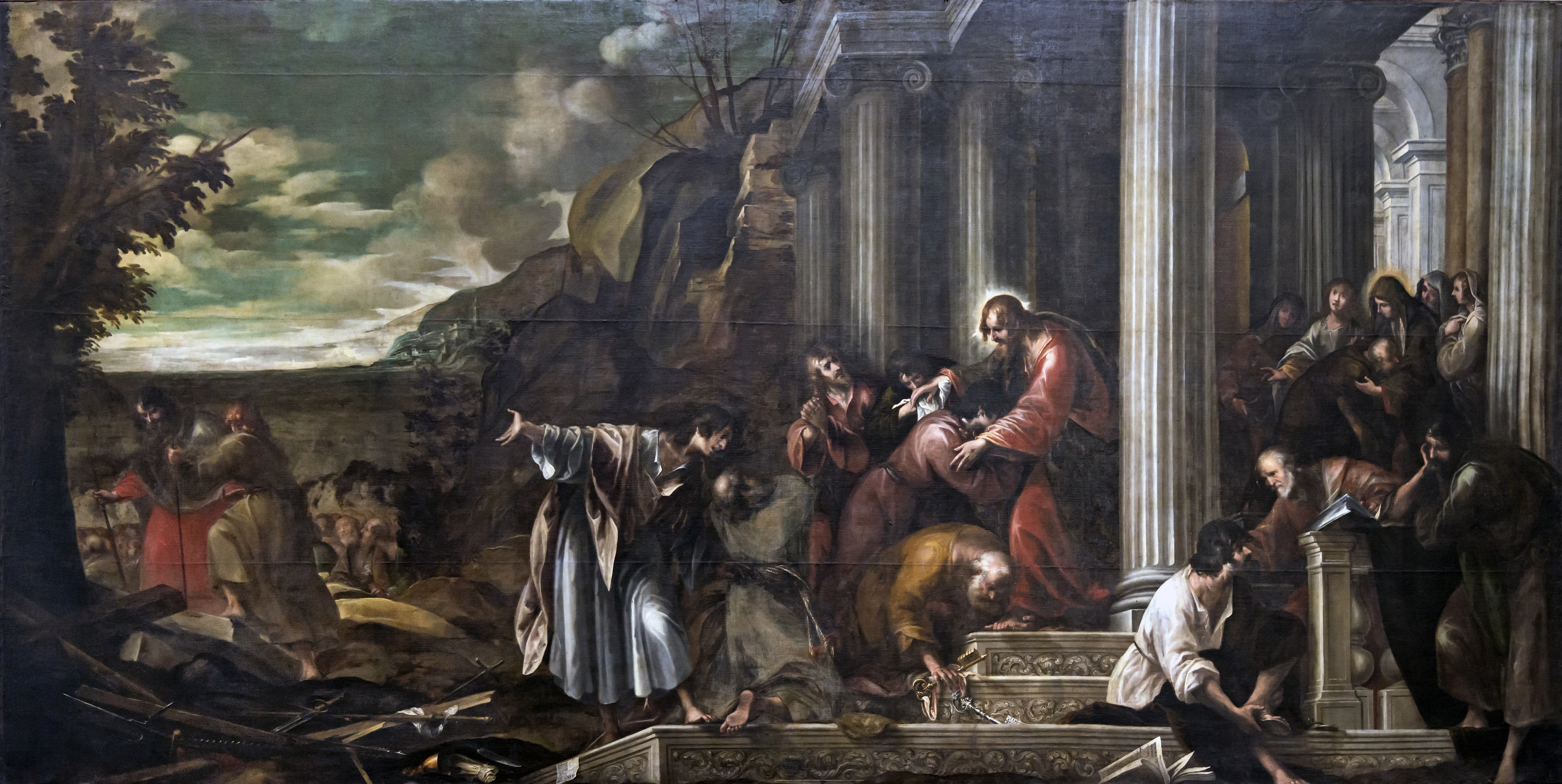
The mission of the Apostles (1631) Battista Bissoni

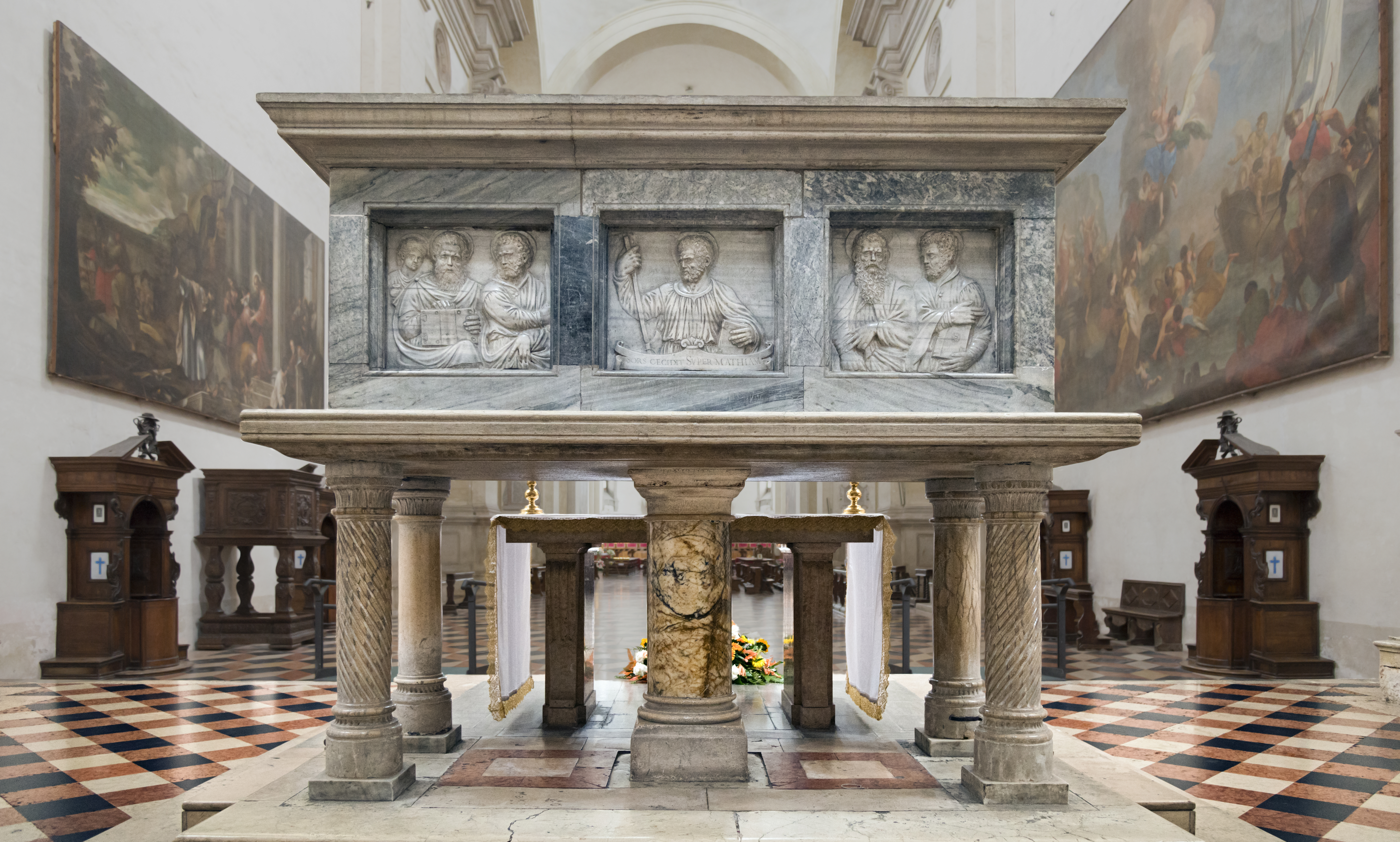
Tomb of Saint Matthias

=== The Corridor of the Martyrs (Il Corridoio dei Martiri) ===
It is accessible from the right transept. Built in 1564 on the ruins of the ancient abbey church of the Middle Ages, it was designed to allow passage to the Sanctuary of St. Prosdocime of Padua. The corridor, painted in the 16th and 17th centuries, is counter-vaulted and, in the middle, an octagonal space covered by a dome decorated with fresco by Giacomo Ceruti. In the center there is the Well of the Martyrs: built on the orders of the abbot Angelo Sangrino in 1565 above the medieval well (still visible in the basement) which was in the middle of the nave of the original basilica. The octagonal marble of Verona marble and alabaster, is finely worked. A grid allows to see at the bottom the bones of the martyrs of the Diocletian era discovered here in 1269 by Blessed Giacoma. In the west corner a piece of the mosaic decoration that adorned the floor of the opilionea basilica of the sixth century is still visible. At the bottom an altar of the sixteenth century on a painting by Pietro Damini The discovery of the Well of the Martyrs and the miraculous power of the twelve candle count among the best works of the artist. Also visible is a large iron cage, dating back to the Middle Ages, which contained the remains of Saint Luke. The two statues of saints Peter and Paul are the work of Francesco Segala.

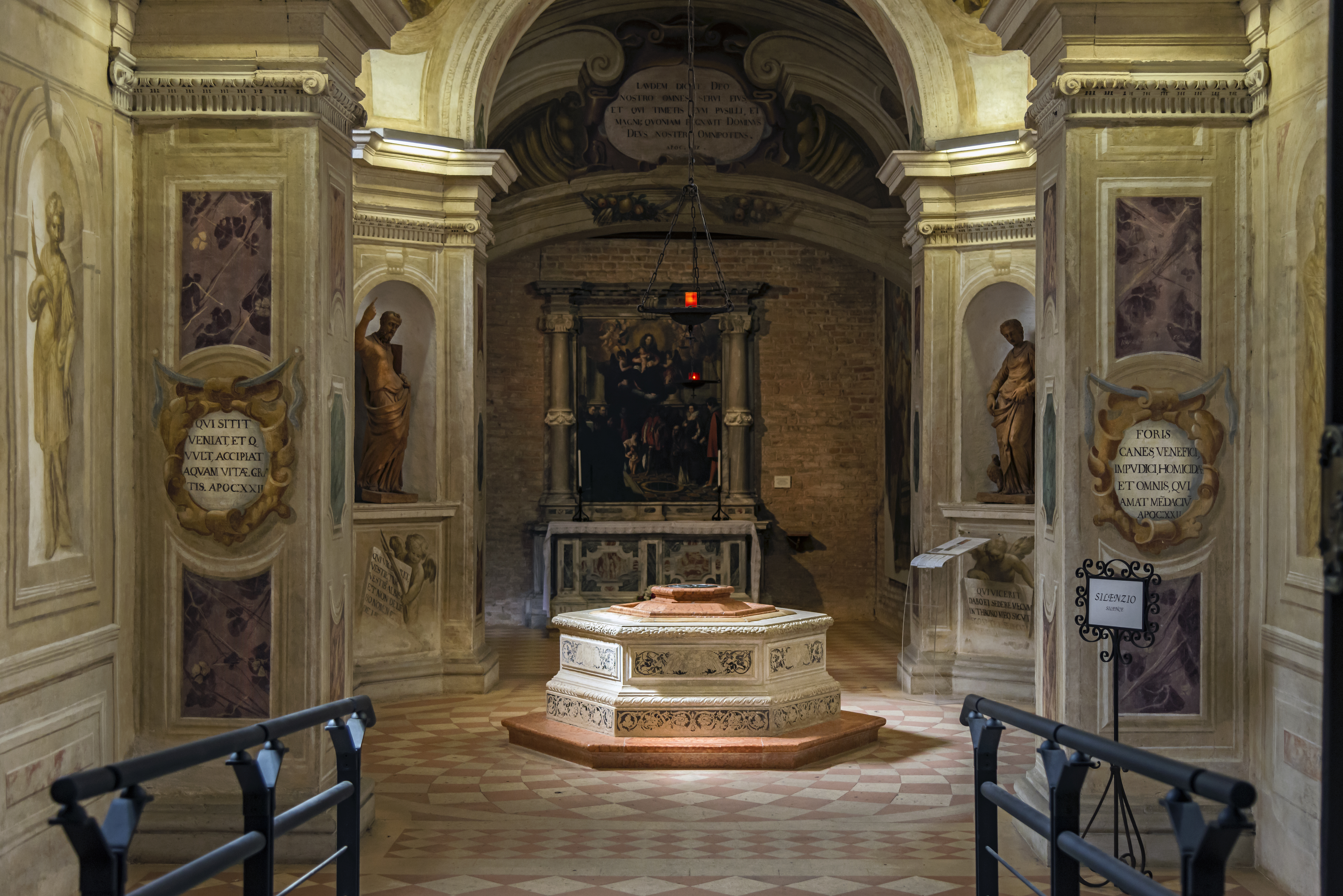
The Corridor of the Martyrs

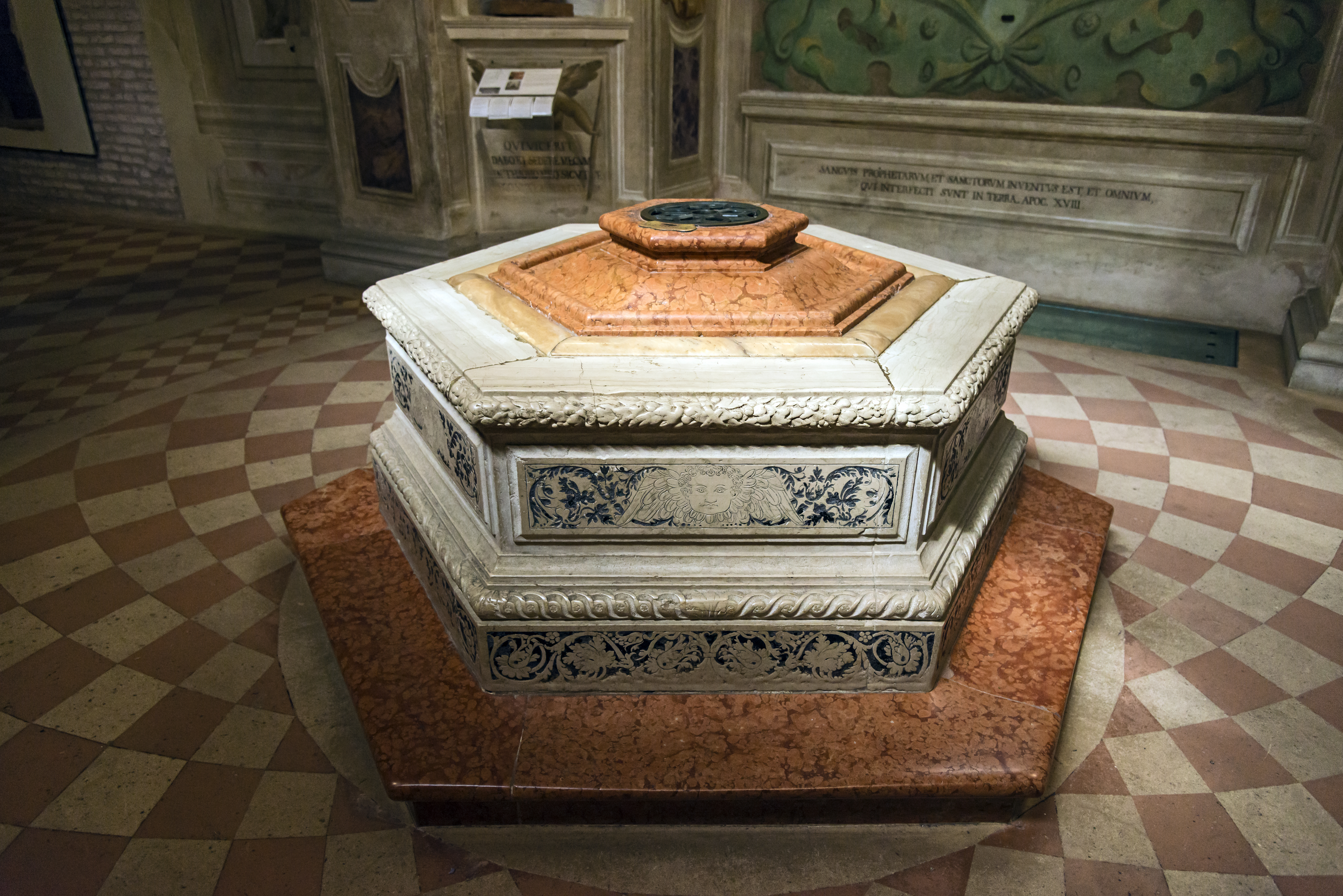
The Well of the Martyrs

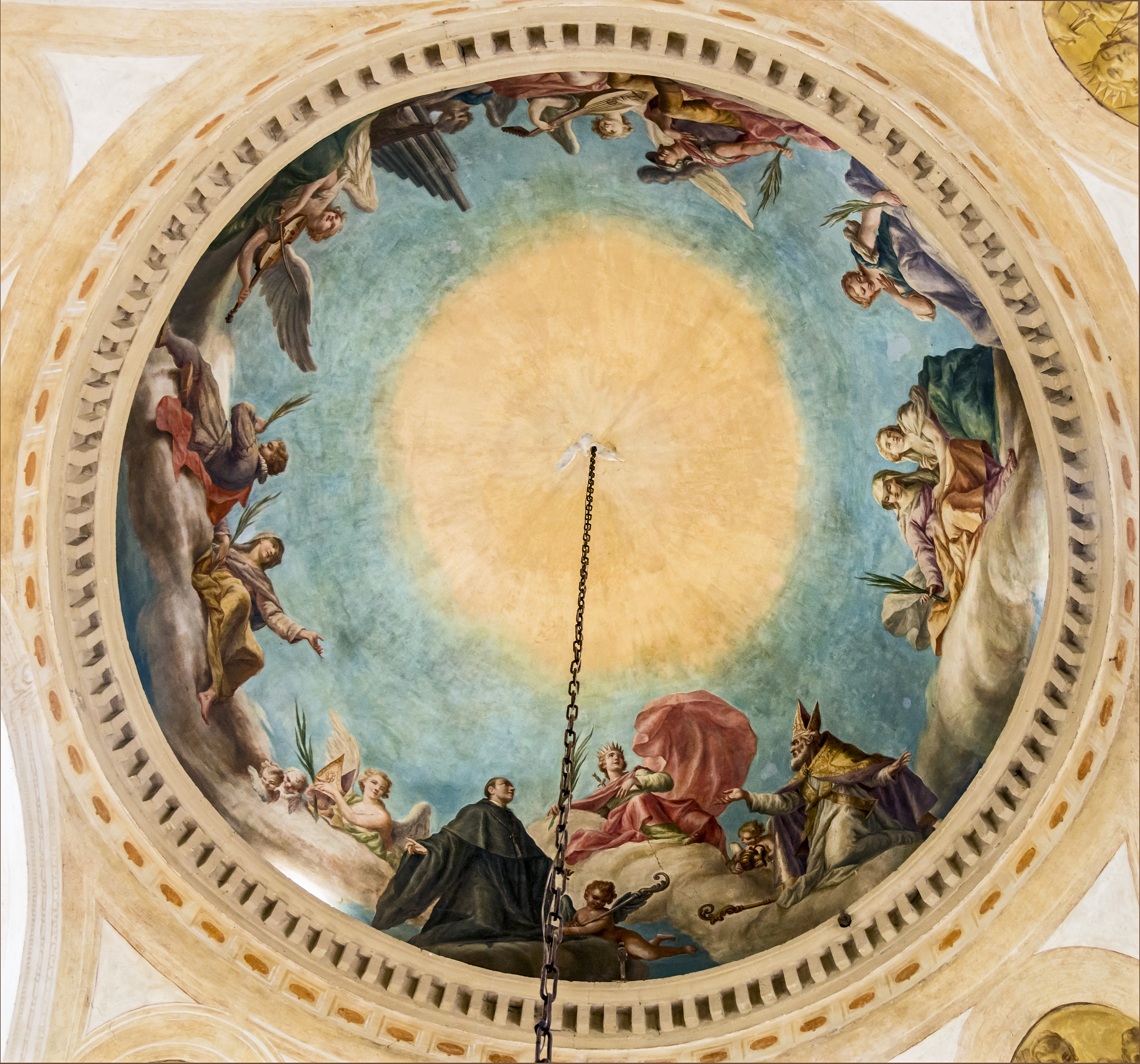
Fresco by Giacomo Ceruti

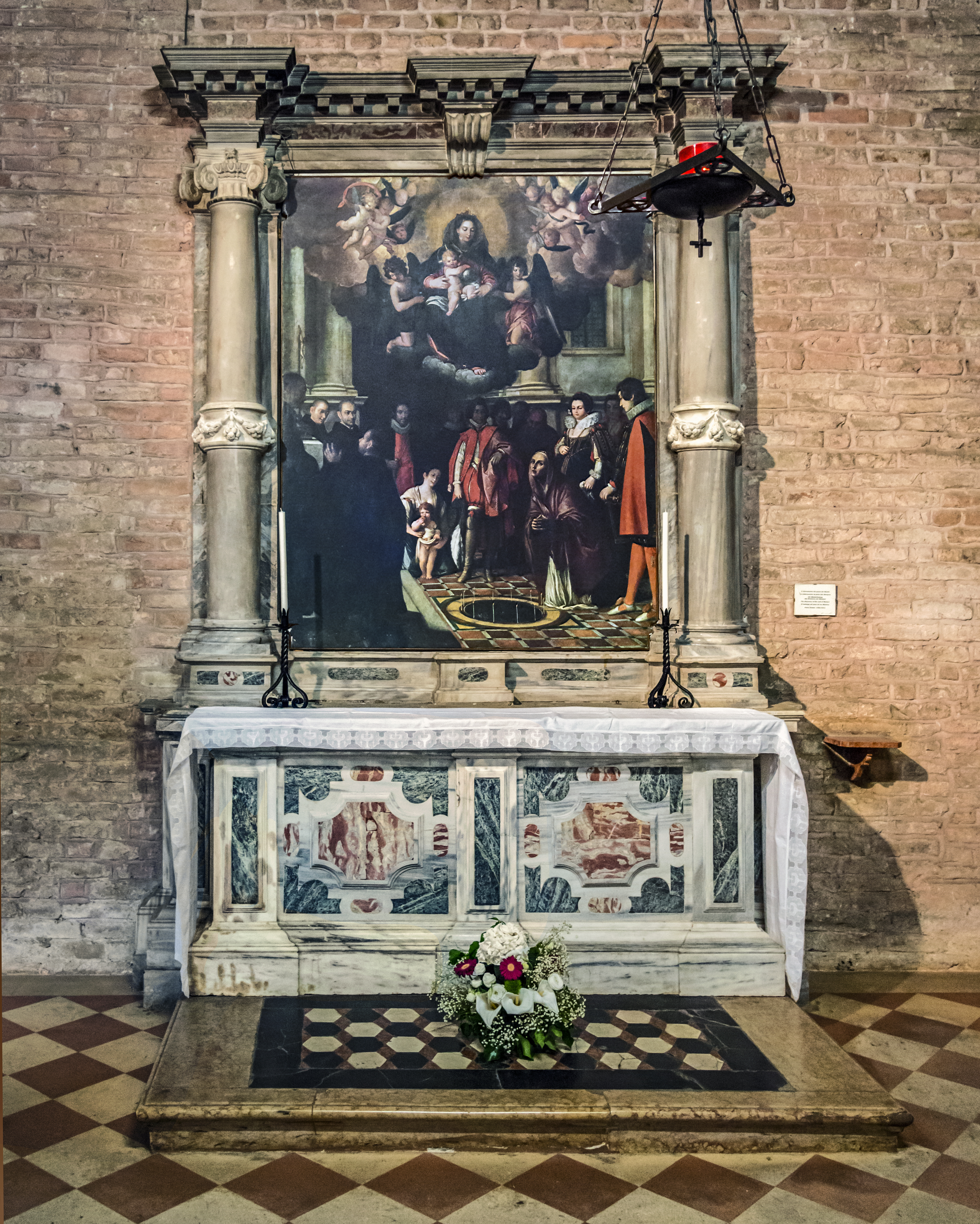
Altar with The Discovery of the Well of Martyrs by Pietro Damini

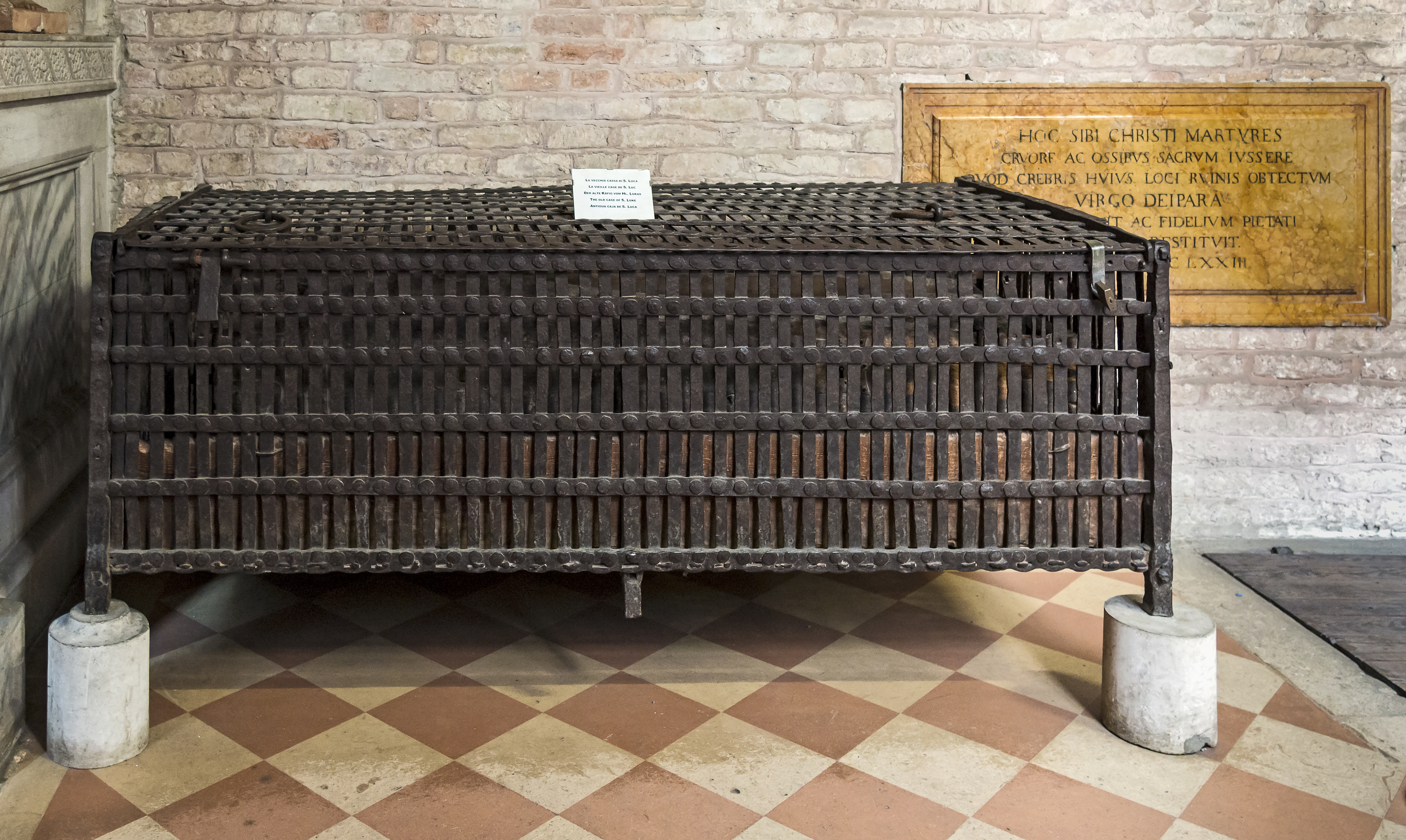
The old cage of St Luke

=== The Sanctuary of Prosdocimus ===
Following the corridor of the Martyrs is the sanctuary of Prosdocimus of Padua or Sanctuary of Santa Maria. One of the oldest buildings in Veneto: dated from the 6th century. It is the only preserved vestige of the opilionea basilica. Originally it was a chapel dedicated to the preservation of relics. The space is conceived on the plane of the Greek cross and is characterized by a very elegant awning composed of dome all painted in grotesque in the sixteenth century to replace the original mosaic decoration. It was the burial place of the first bishops of Padua, including the first, St Prosdocime of Padua, whose body rests in the altar of 1564. It consists of a Roman sarcophagus placed on the right (in relation to the " apse). Above the altar is a bas-relief depicting St Prosdocime of Padua in the Roman aristocrat's dating from the 5th century. In front of the apse a pergola, in Greek marble, astonishing work of the sixth century practically intact preserved in the initial position of Iconostase Along the wall of the small entrance hall, remains of frescoes from the twelfth century, decorations from the 16th century. The tympanum of the door of the basilica opilionea of the sixth century.

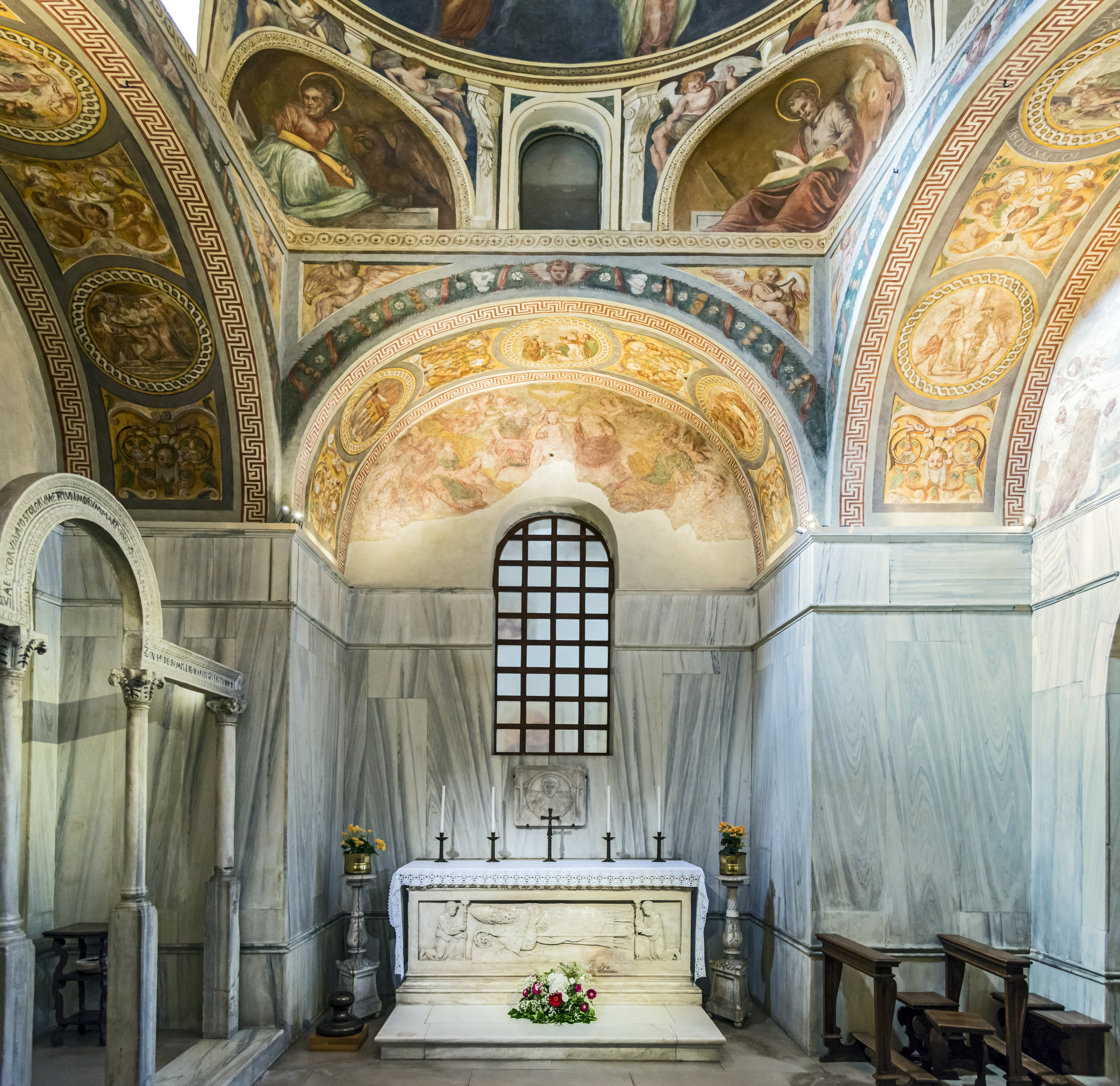
The sanctuary of Prosdocimus

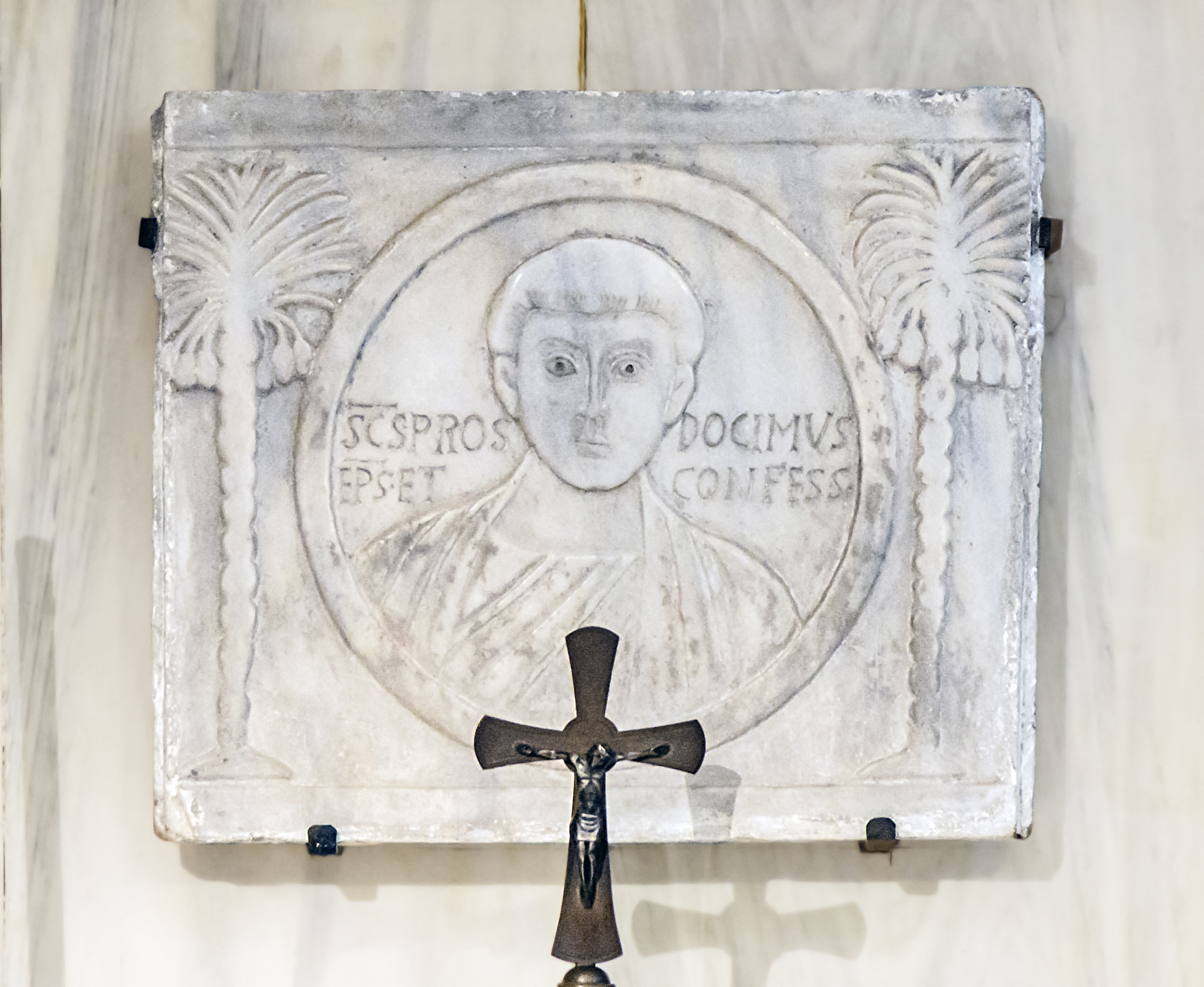
Bas-relief depicting St Prosdocime from the 5th century

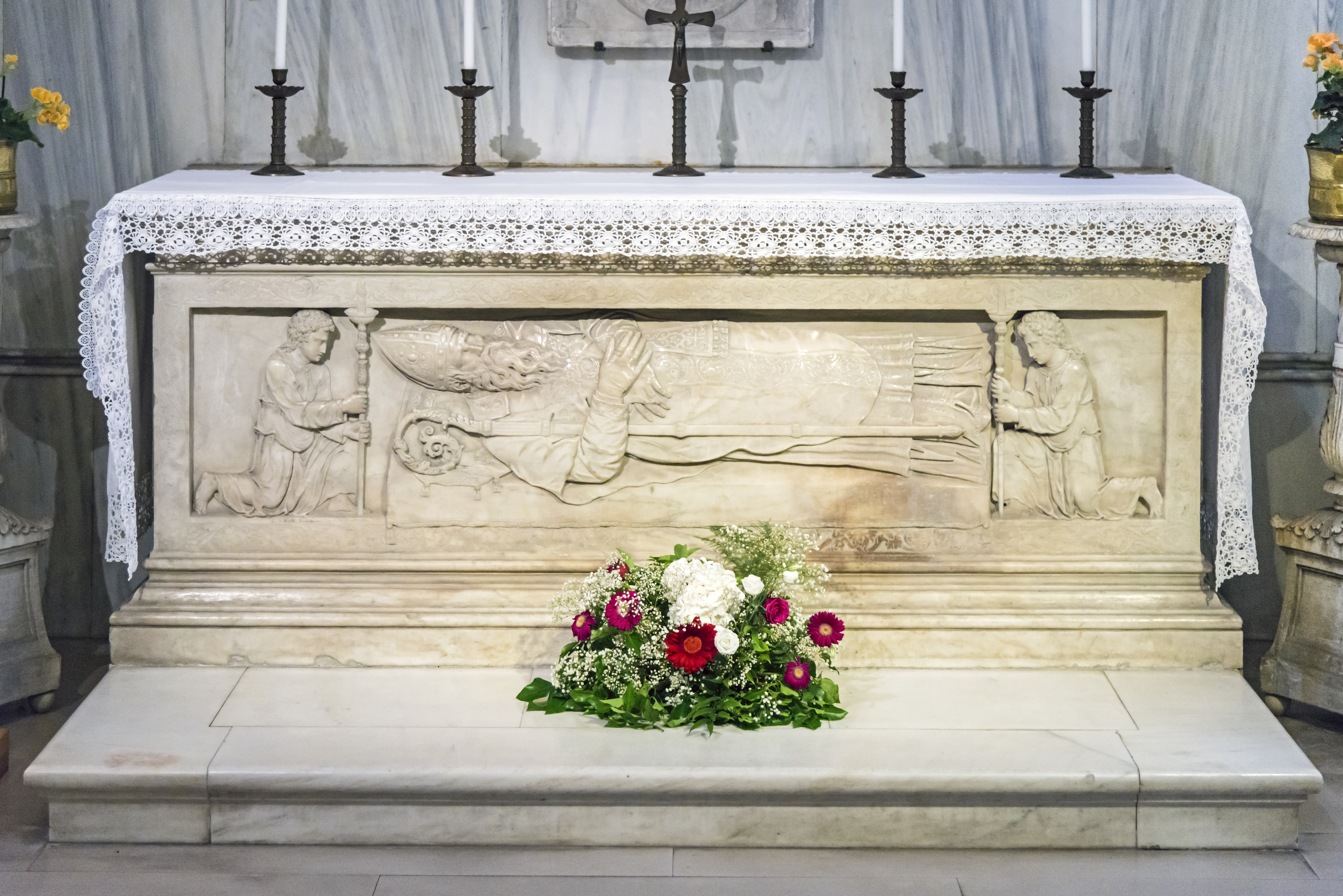
Tomb of Saint Prosdocimus

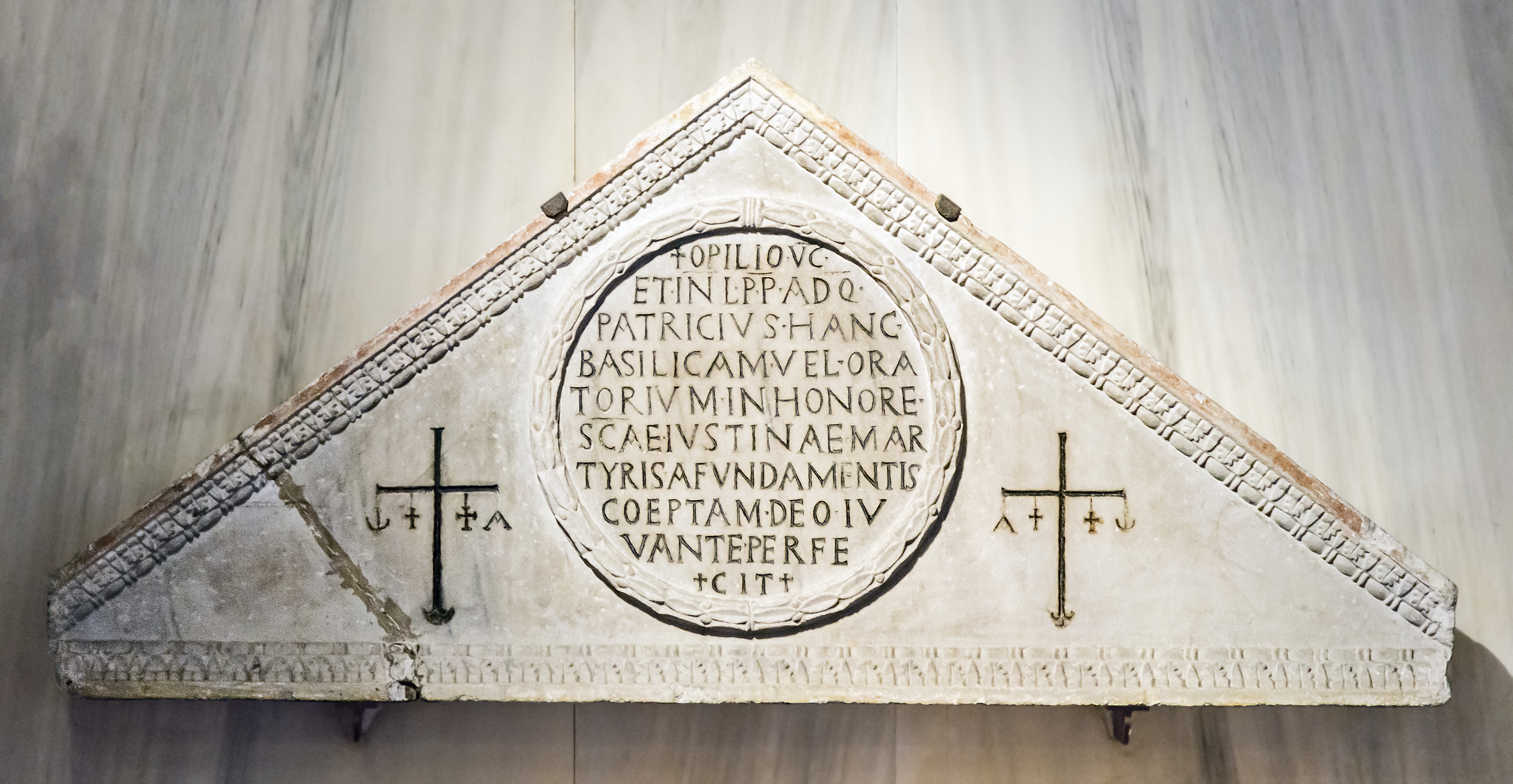
The tympanum of the door of the basilica opilionea of the sixth century

=== Right side of the Nave ===
Chapel of sant'Urio

The arch placed on top of the altar (1682) contains the remains of Urio who was the guardian priest of the church of Santi Apostoli in Constantinople who saved the relics of St. Luke, St. Matthew, Icon of the Virgin of the iconoclastic fury bearing the whole until Patavium. The statue of Sant'Urio, the angels and the saints Thomas and Thaddeus are by Bernardo Falcone. The work of marquetry in polychromatic stones is by Corbarelli.

Chapel of the Holy Innocents

The chapel built during the first half of the 17th century was originally used for the Blessed Sacrament, which was transferred to one of the apsidal chapels. The present aspect dates from 1675 with the sanctuary for the relics of Saints Innocents (the remains of three victims of Herod). "The disarray of Santa Rachel" is by Giovanni Comin (1690); The two saints: James the Minor and John are attributed to Michele Fabris. The work of marquetry in polychrome stone is by Corbarelli.

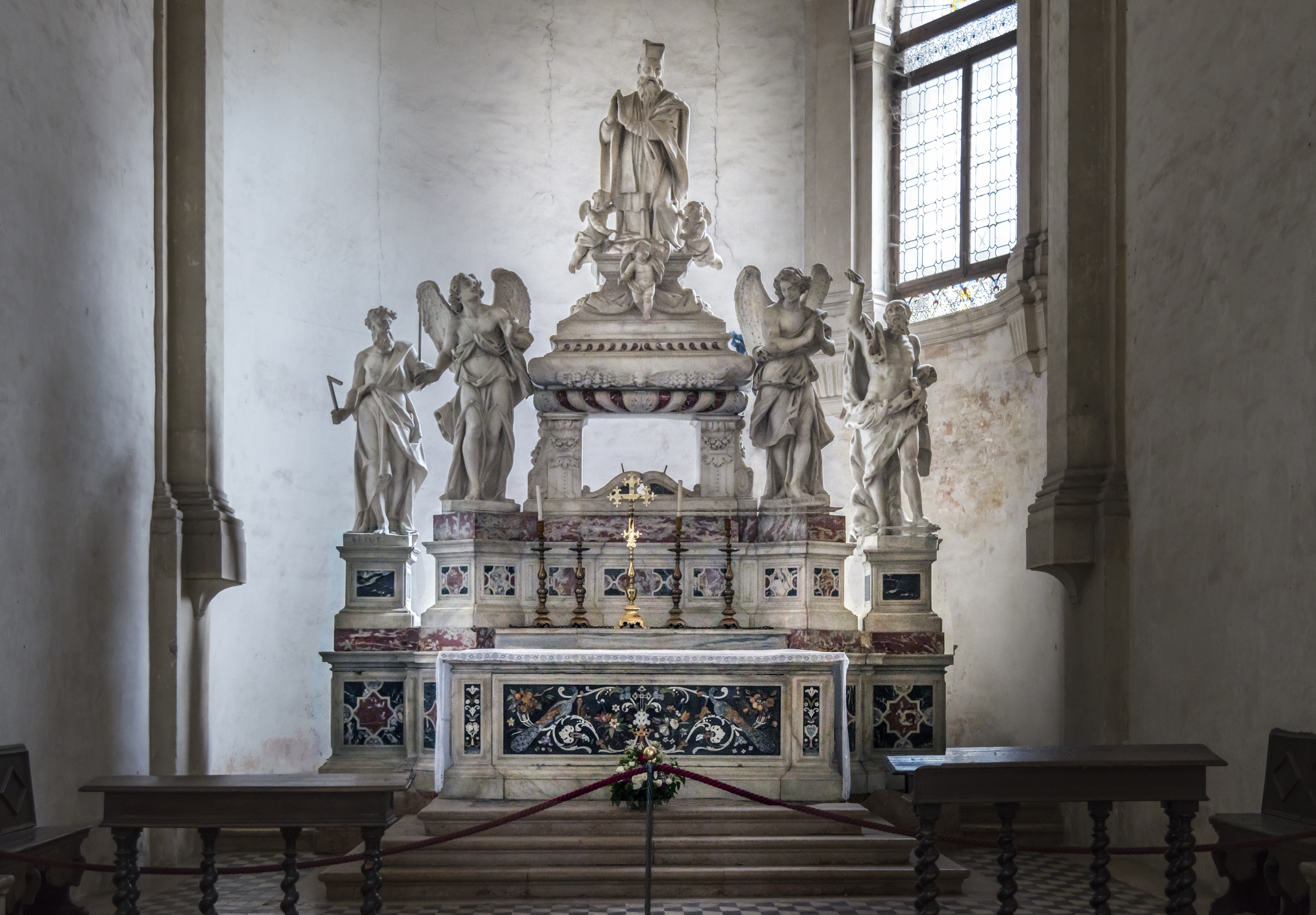
Chapel of sant'Urio

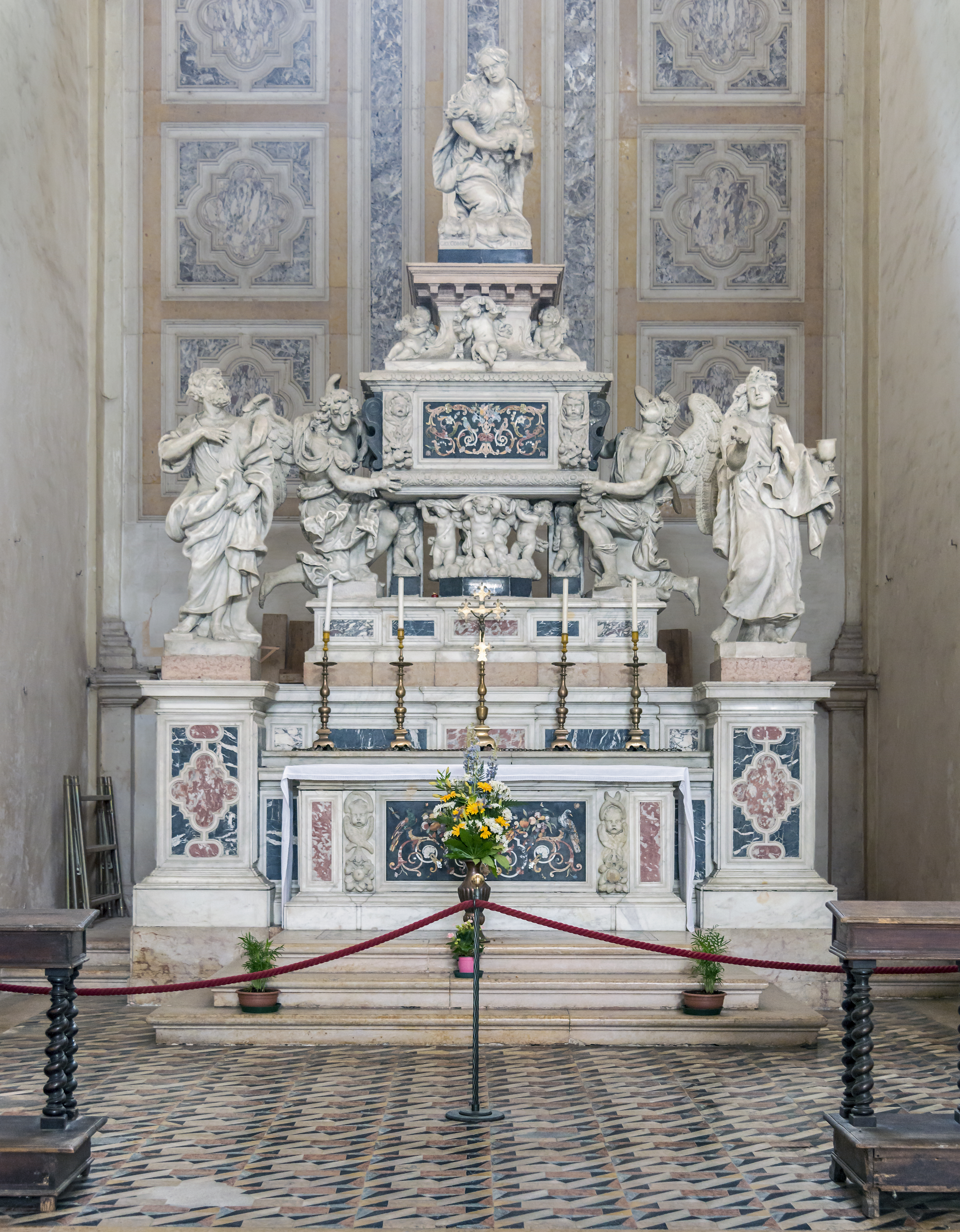
Chapel of the Holy Innocents

Chapel of Saint Benedict

The altar is erected in black and white marble of Genoa. The table of the altarpiece: Saint Benedict welcomes Saint Placid and Saint Maurus by Palma the Younger.

Chapel of Saint Scholastica

The columns that support the altar are of Salò marble. The painting of the altarpiece depicts 'The Death of Saint Scholastica' is by Luca Giordano in 1674.

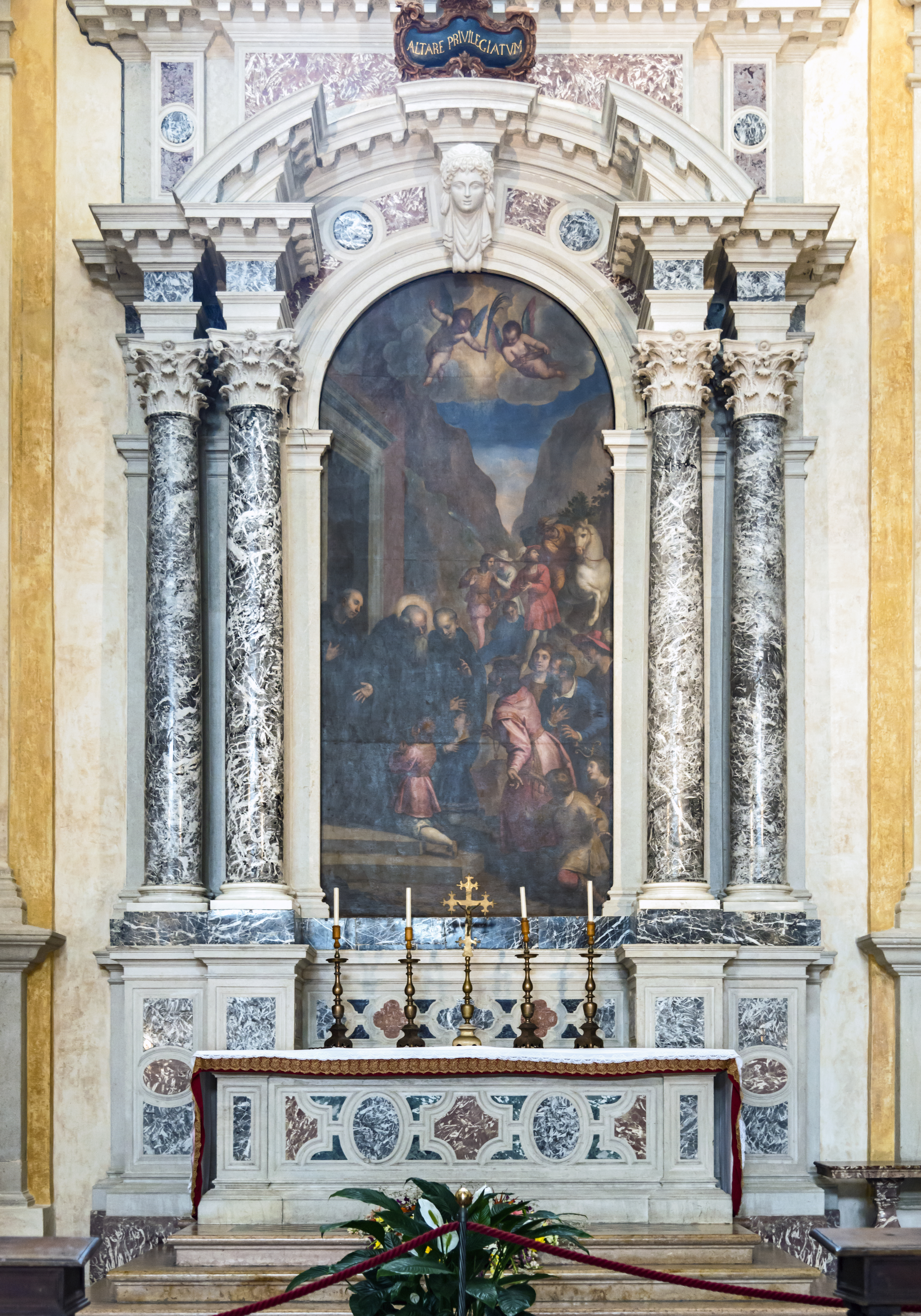
Chapel of Saint Benedict

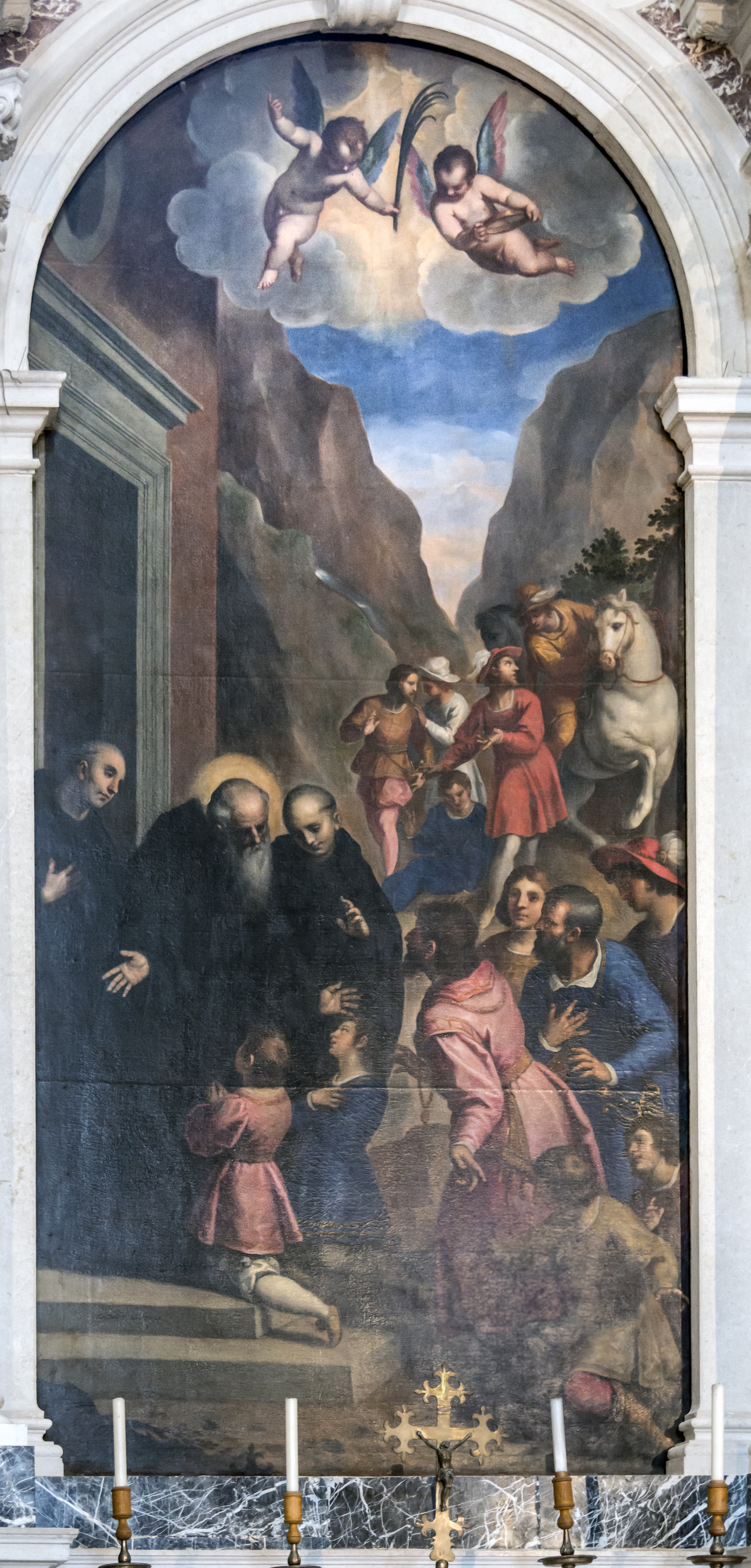
St. Benedict welcomes his disciples, Maurus and Placidus

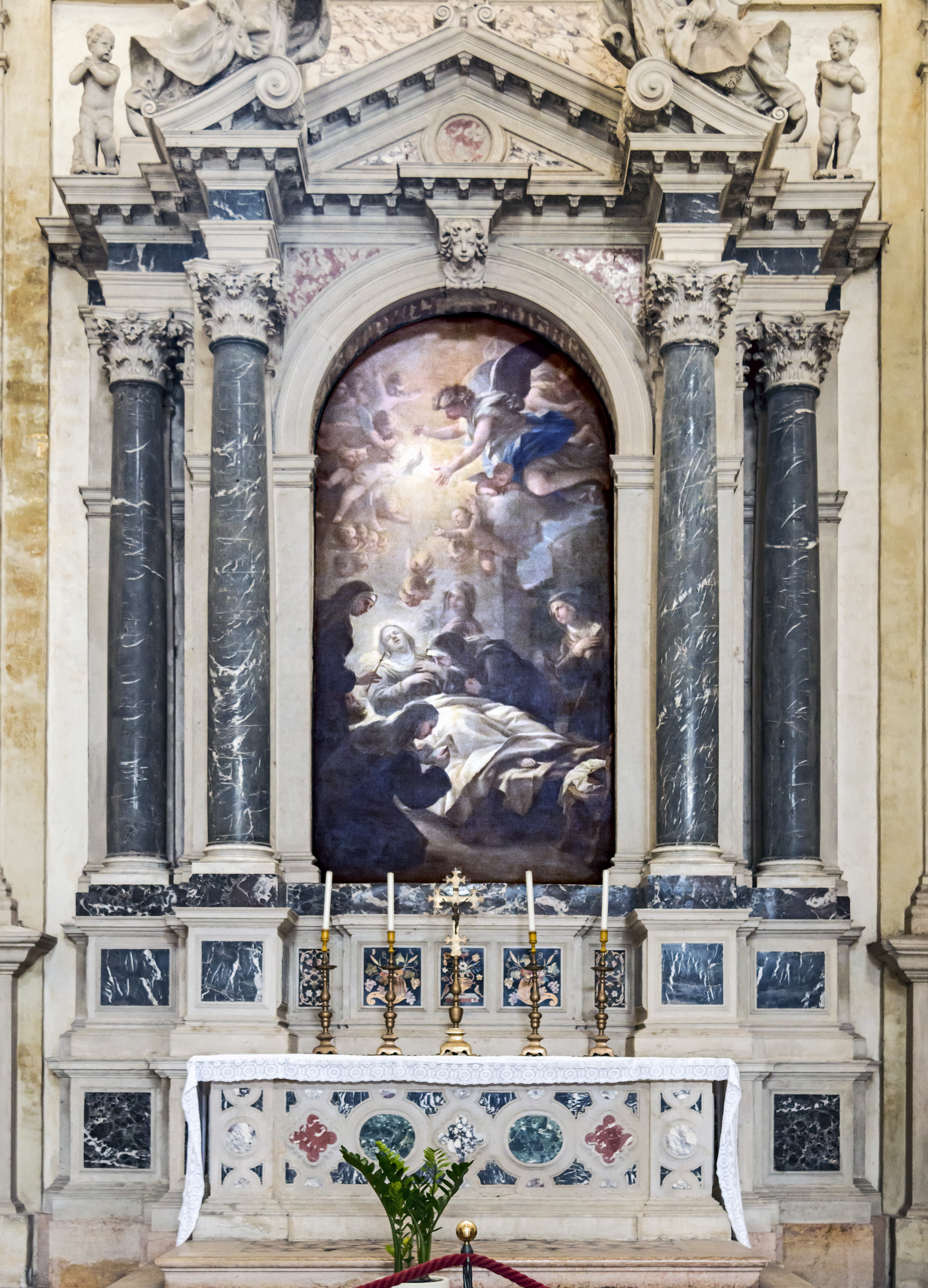
Chapel of Saint Scholastica

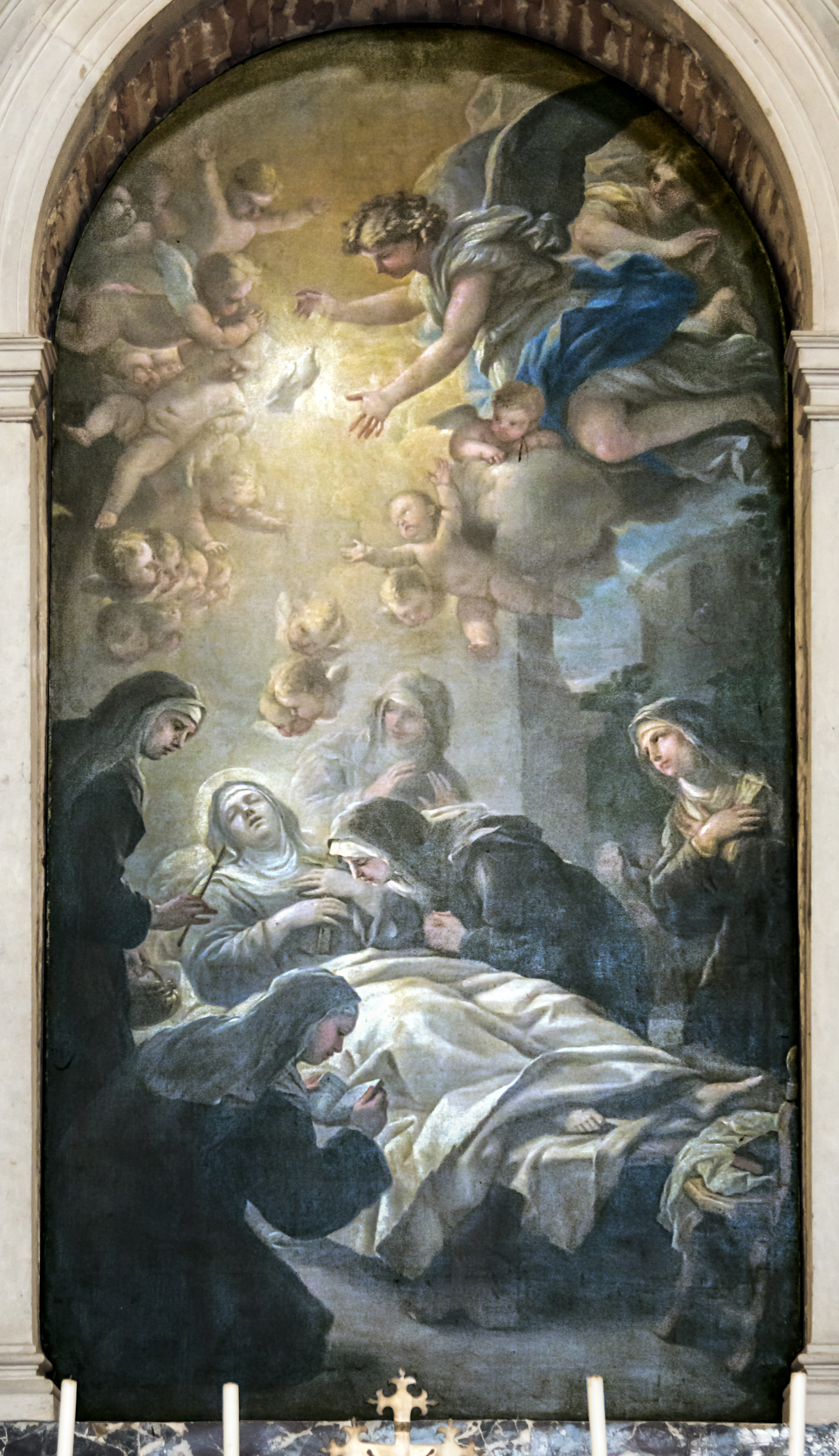
Death of St. Scholastica by Luca Giordano

Chapel of saint Gerard Sagredo

The painting of the altarpiece dated 1674 by Johann Carl Loth shows the "Martyrdom of St. Gerard Sagredo"

Chapel of Saint Getrude

The painting of the altarpiece Ecstasy of St. Gertrude by Pietro Liberi

Chaeple of the conversion of St. Paul

The table of the altarpiece is attributed to Paolo Veronese in collaboration with his students, he represents The Conversion of St. Paul. On the left wall a canvas in a lunette represents the same subject, this work is by Gaspare Diziani formerly in the Chiesa delle Terese.

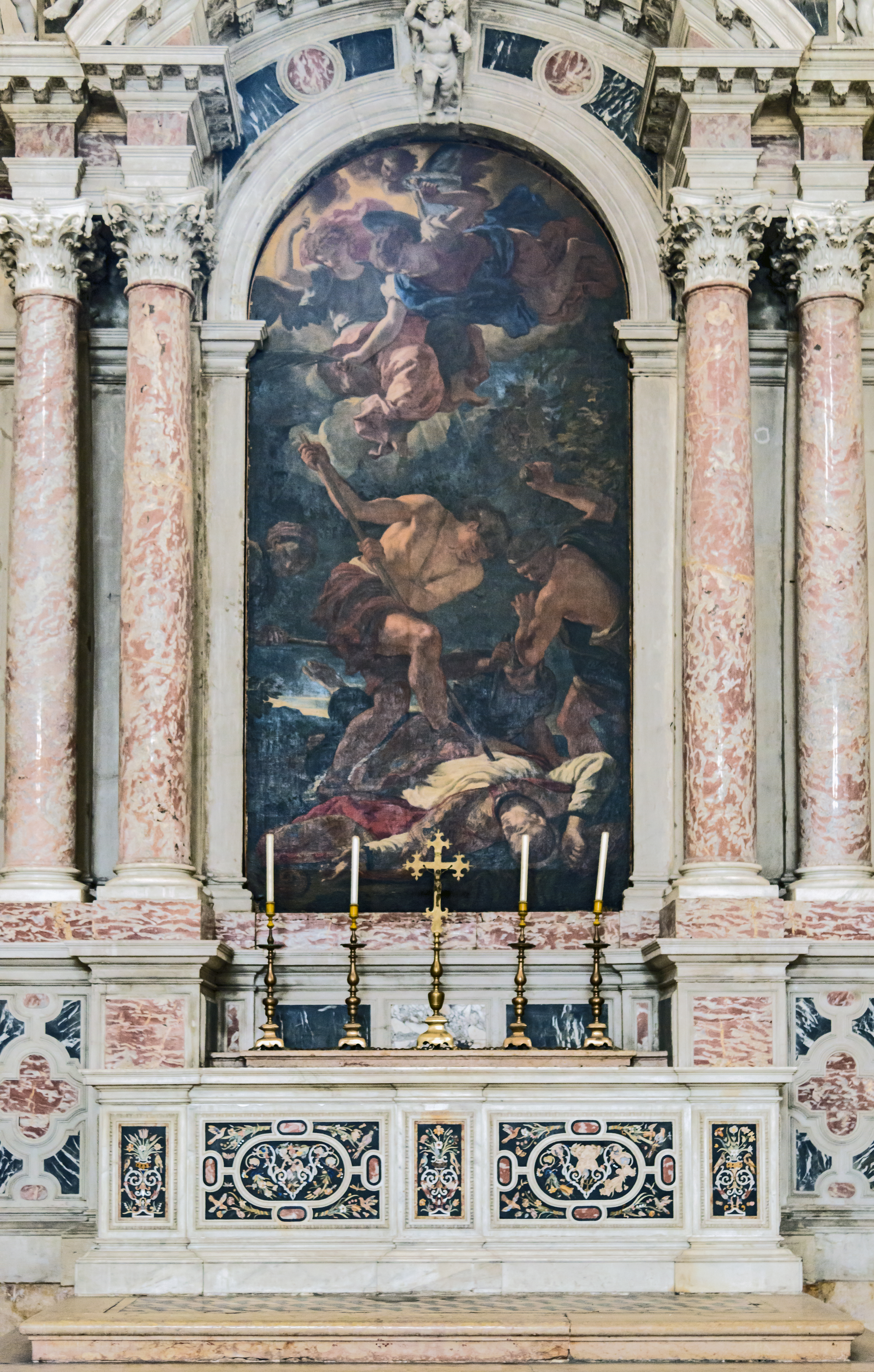
Chapel of saint Gerard Sagredo

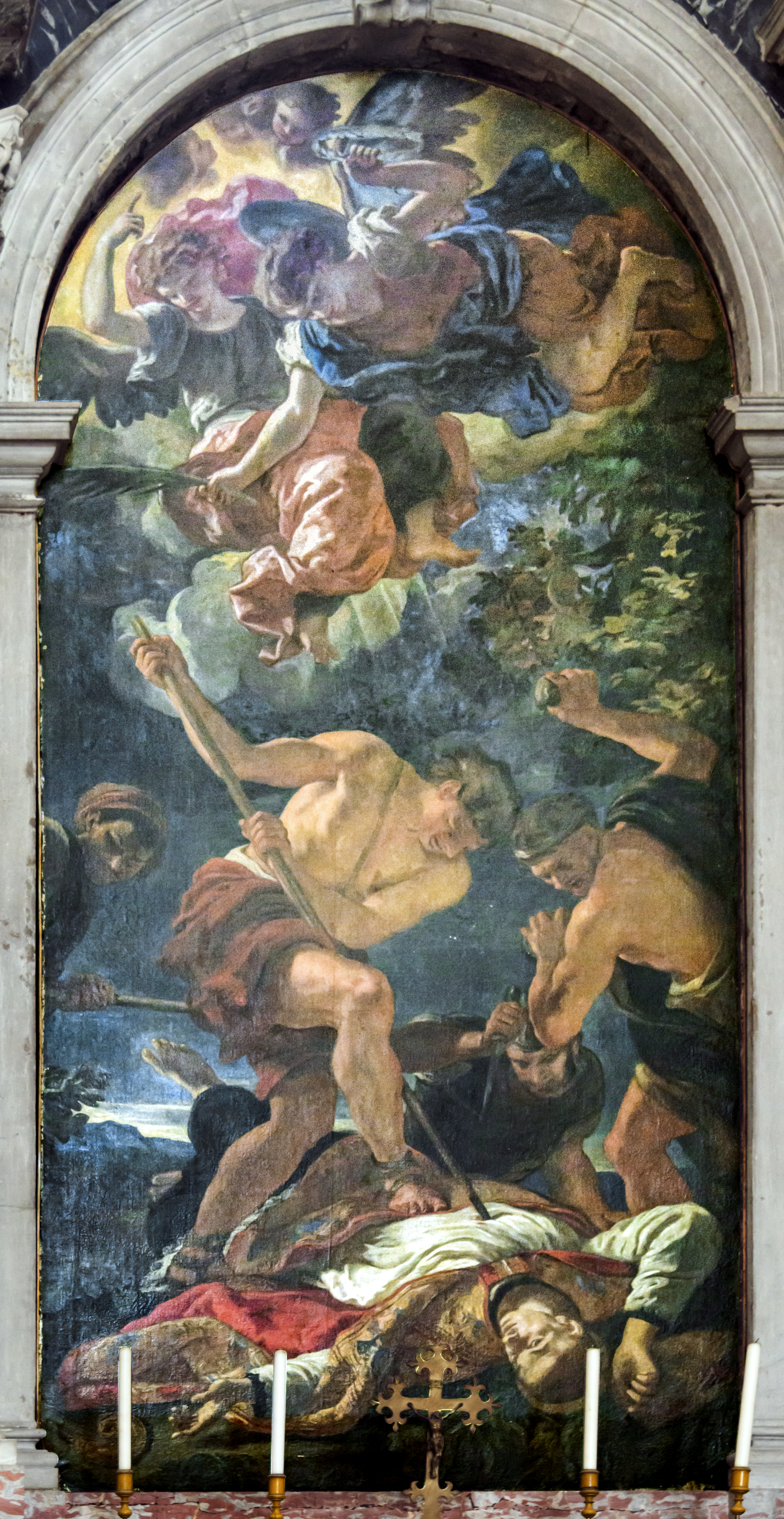
Martyrdom of St. Gerard by Carlo Loth

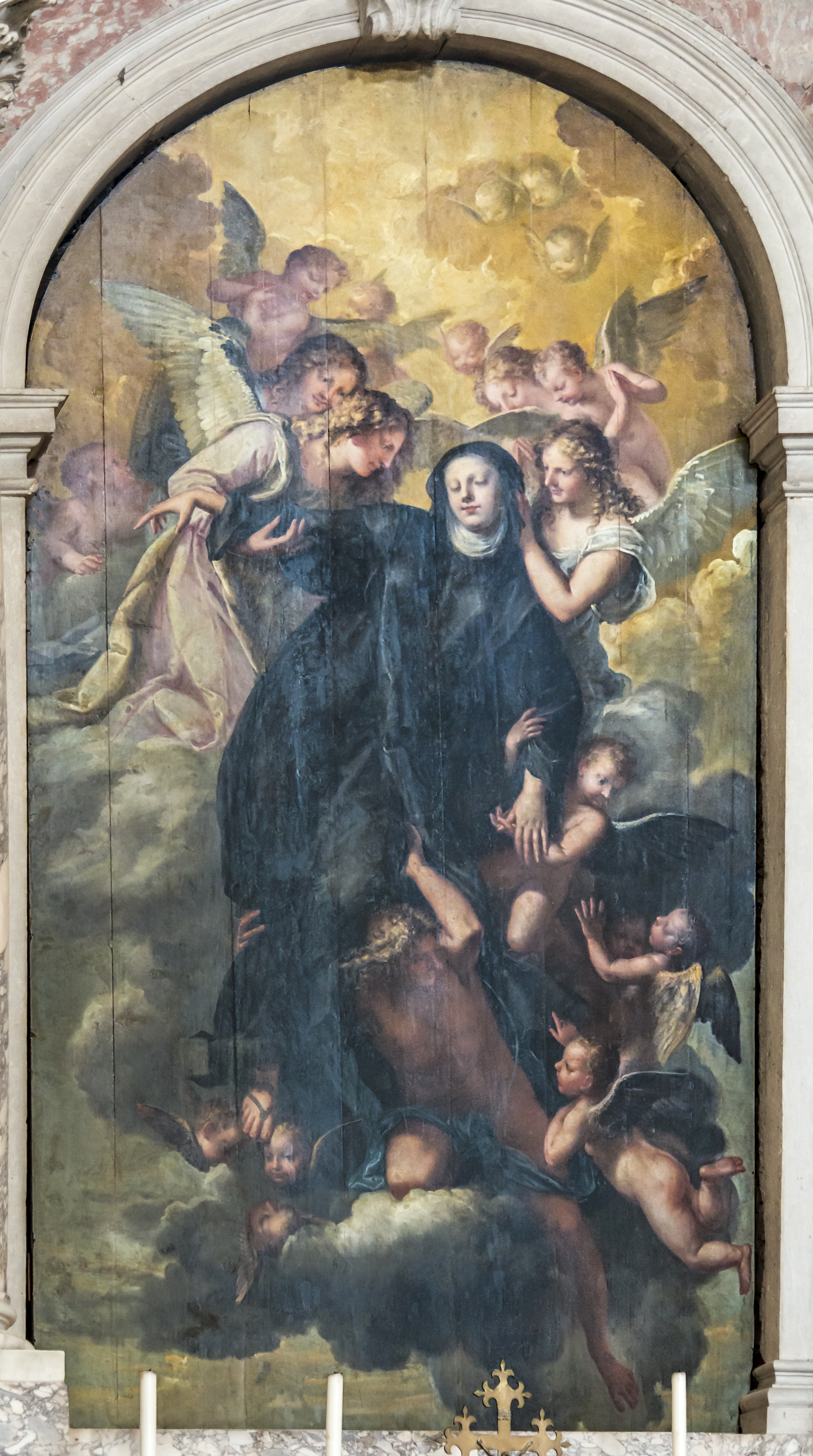
Ecstasy of St. Gertrude by Pietro Liberi

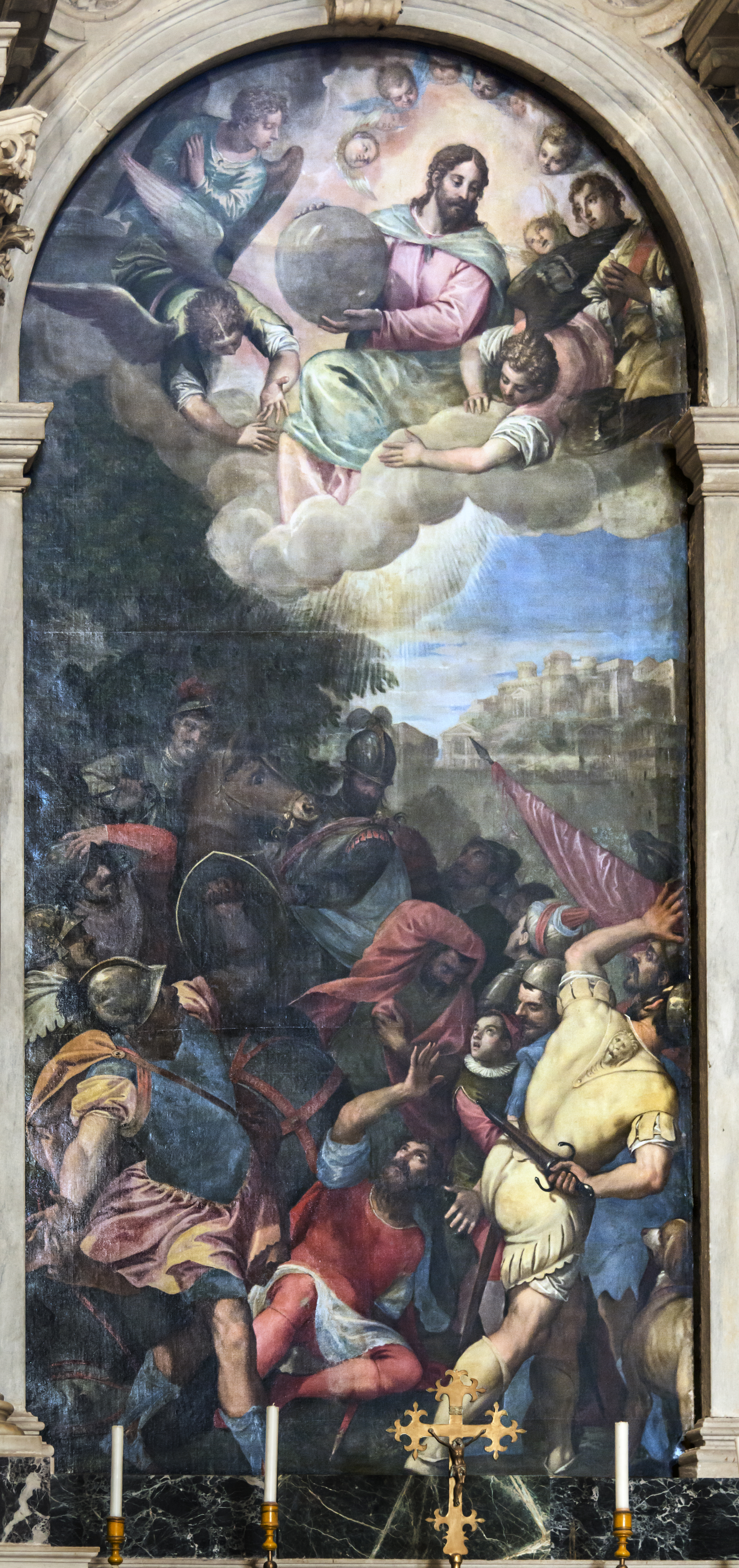
Conversion of St. Paul by Paolo Veronese

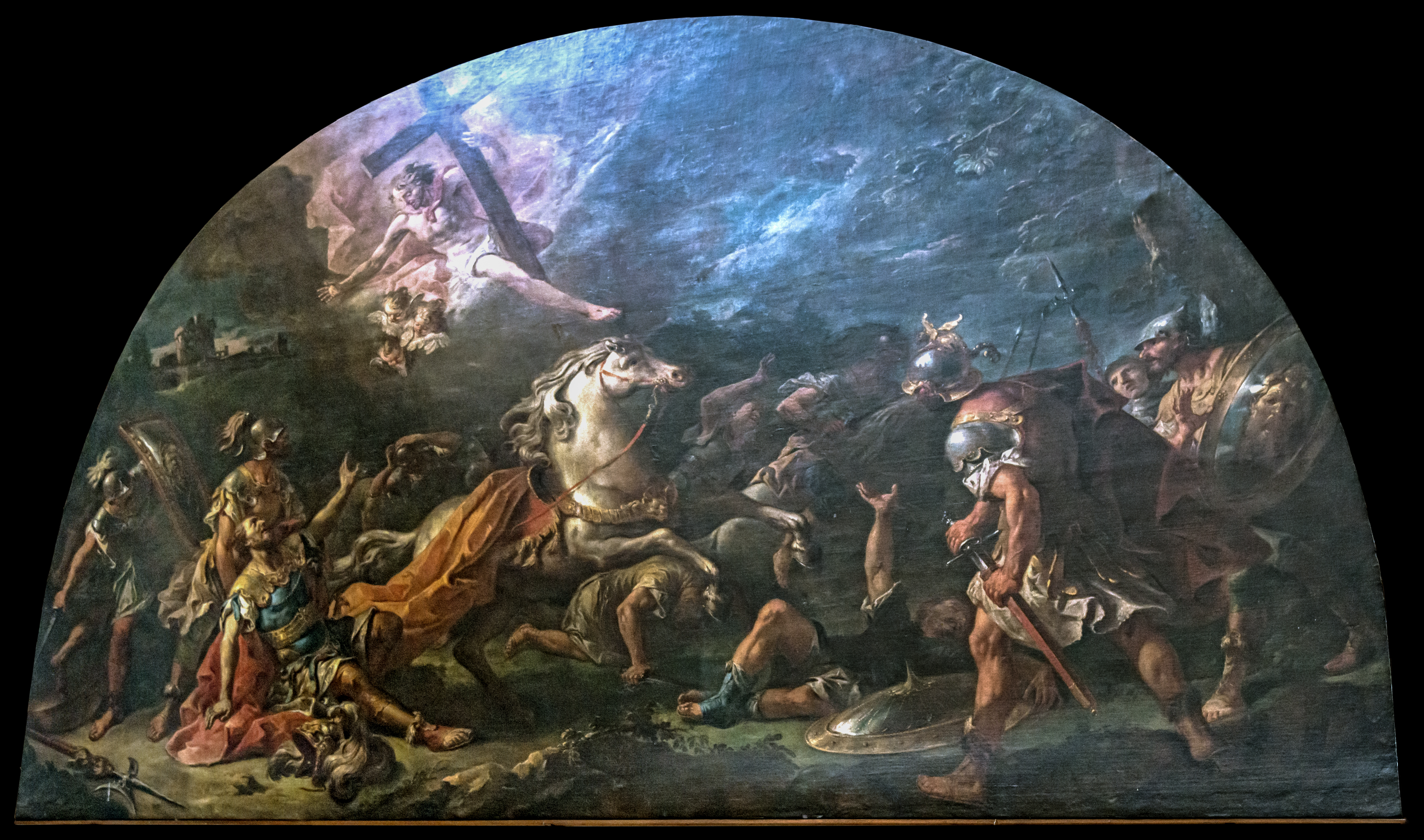
Conversion of St. Paul by Gaspare Diziani

== See also ==
- 16th-century Western domes
