= Bienno =

- Comune
- Comune di Bienno
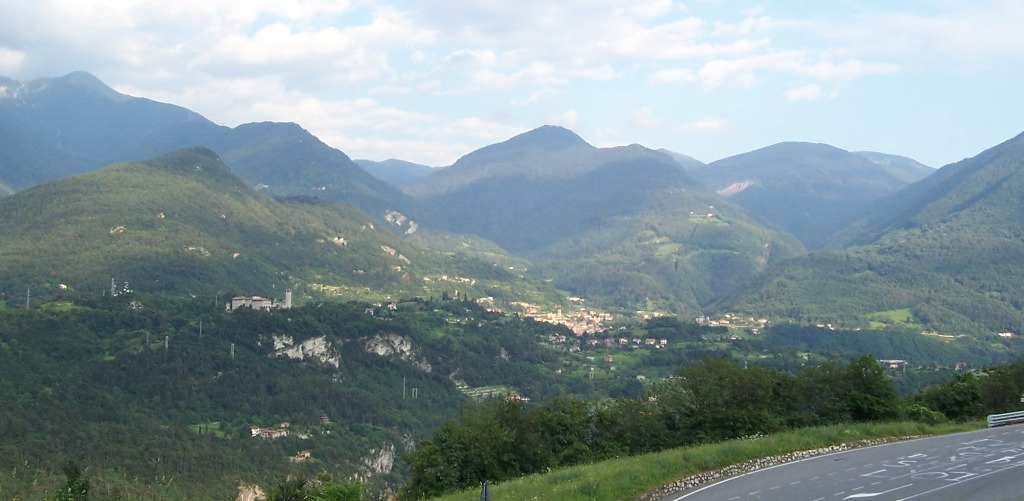
- View of Bienno

- Coat of arms

- Location within Italy Location within Lombardy
- Coordinates: 45.93667°N 10.29417°E
- Country: Italy
- Region: Lombardy
- Province: Brescia (BS)

Government
  - Mayor: Massimo Maugeri

Area
  - Total: 30 km^{2} (12 sq mi)
- Elevation: 445 m (1,460 ft)

Population (31 December 2011)
  - Total: 3,619
  - Density: 120/km^{2} (310/sq mi)
- Demonym: Biennesi
- Time zone: UTC+1 (CET)
  - Summer (DST): UTC+2 (CEST)
- Postal code: 25040
- Dialing code: 0364
- Patron saint: Santi Faustino e Giovita
- Saint day: 15 febbraio
- Website: Official website

Bienno (Camunian: Bién) is an Italian comune in Val Camonica, province of Brescia, Lombardy. It is one of I Borghi più belli d'Italia ("The most beautiful villages of Italy").

== Geography ==
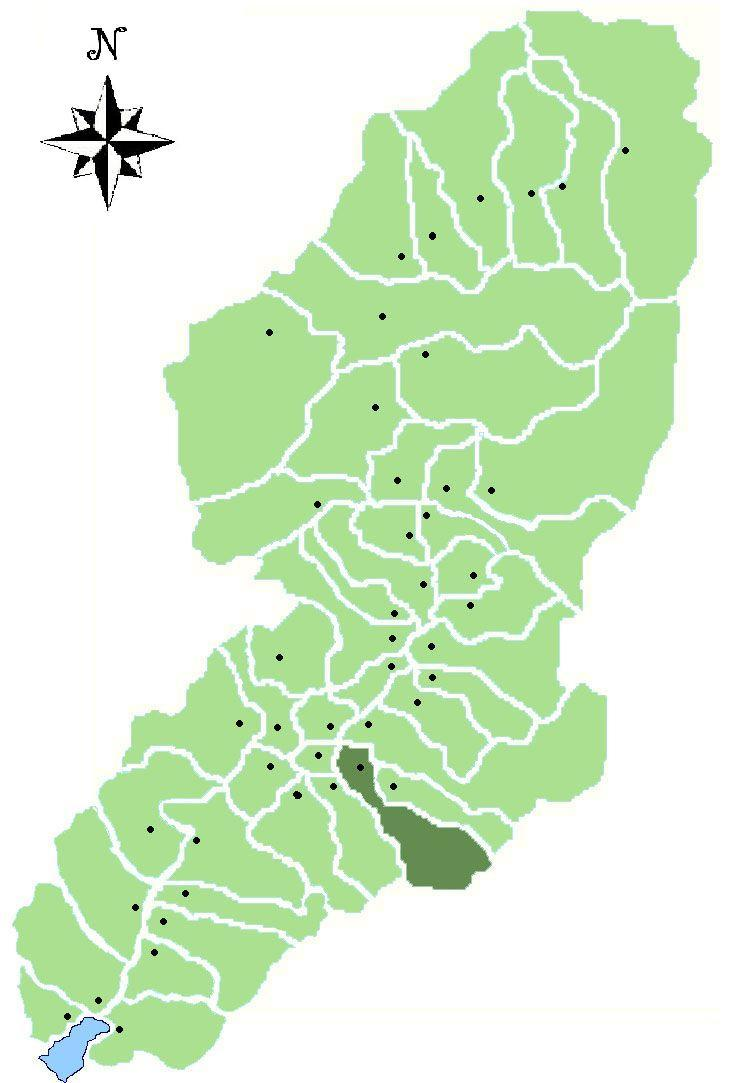
Bienno's territory in Valle Camonica

The village is located in Val Grigna, on the northern side of the river Grigna. It is bordered by other towns such as: Bagolino, Berzo Inferiore, Bovegno, Breno, Cividate Camuno, Collio, Prestine.

Map of Bienno in Brescia's territory

== History ==
In 1295 a dispute occurred with the neighbouring village Bovegno regarding some high pastures.

On 25 January 1350 the bishop of Brescia invested iure feuds for a tenth of the rights in the territories of the Municipality of Bienno (vicinia) and men of Bienno. This also happened back in 1295, 1336, and later in 1388, 1423 and 1486.

In 1391 the land of Bienno, which sided with the Ghibellines, was the site of extensive cattle raiding by the Guelph Camuni, led by Baroncino Nobili of Lozio.

The peace of Breno was signed on 31 December 1397 by the representative of the community of Bienno, Lanini Bertolino di Martino, who was a Ghibelline.

Between 1805 and 1815 the town of Bienno was united to Prestine and called "Bienno with Prestine."

== Main sights ==
Bienno is part of the club of "The Most Beautiful Villages in Italy" creation of the Council of Tourism of the Association of Italian Municipalities (ANCI).

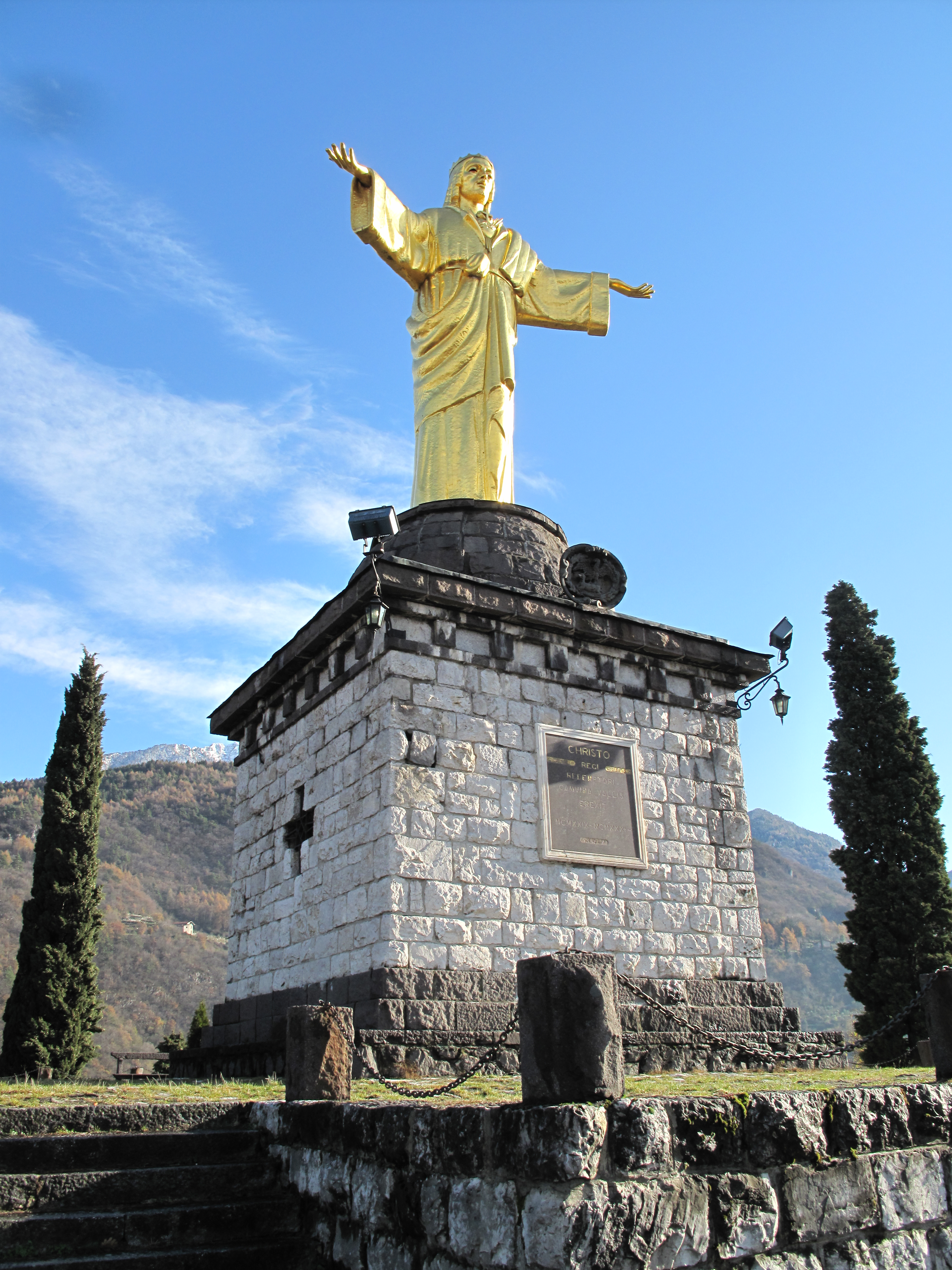
Statua di Cristo Re (Timo Bortolotti, 1930)

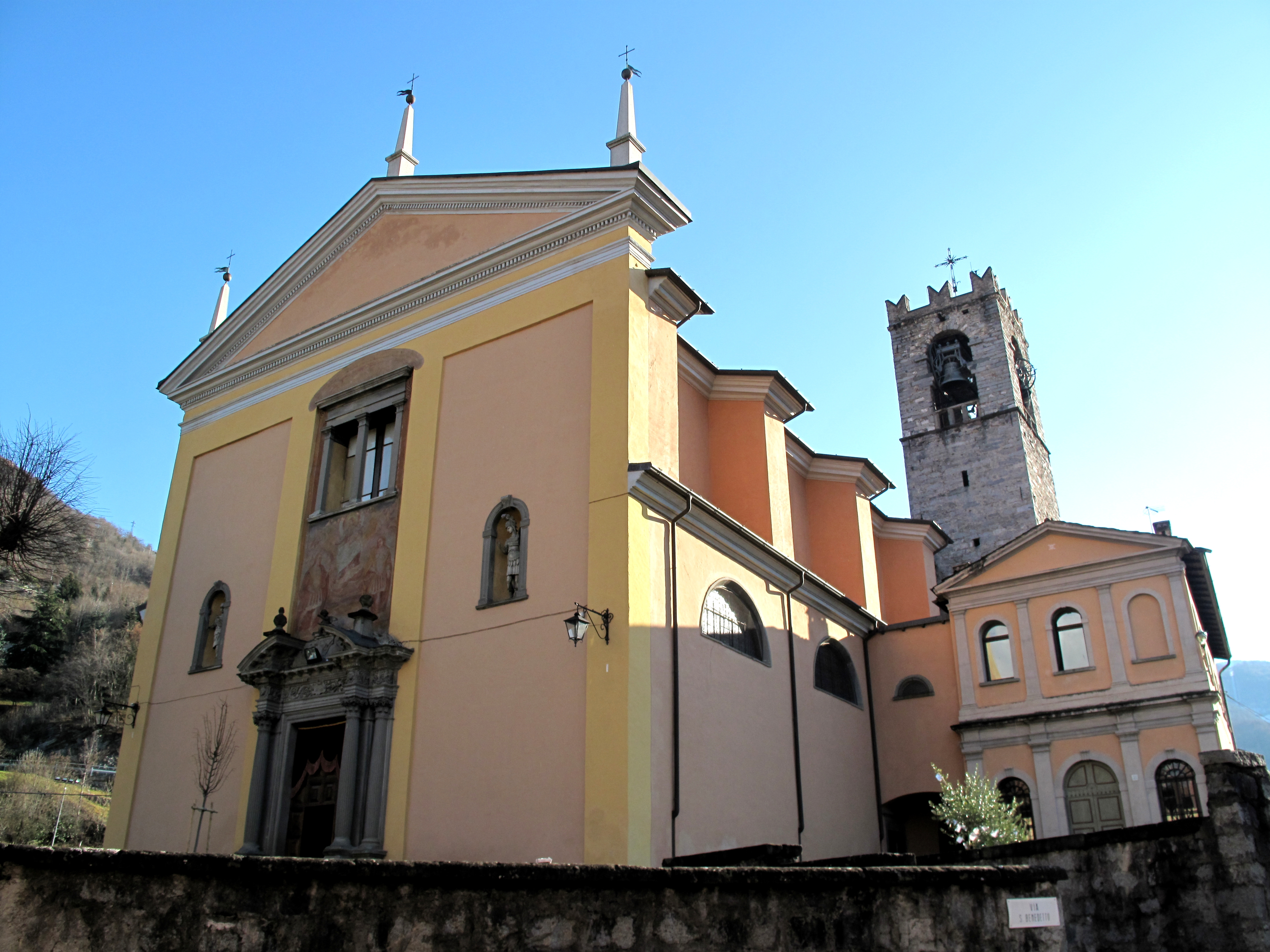
Parish church of St Faustino and Giovita

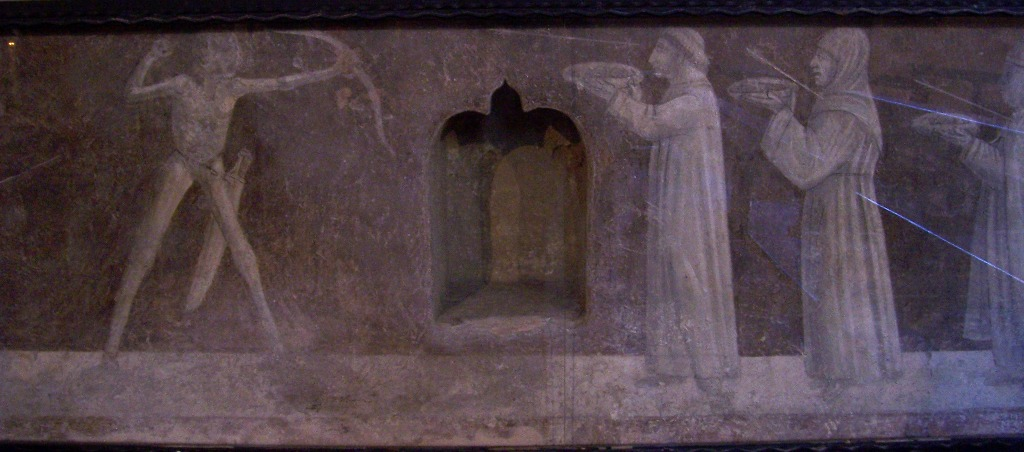
Danse macabre in St Maria

=== Religious architecture ===
- The parish church, dedicated to Saints Faustino and Giovita, was rebuilt in the early years of 17th Century strictly in accordance with Counter-Reformation rules; a single nave with six side altars; impressive painting cycle mostly made by Giovanni Mauro della Rovere (also known as Il Fiamminghino); a beautiful wrought iron gate dating back to 1647; a 17th-century organ made by members of the Antegnati family and remodeled by Serassi.
- The smallest church in the lower part of the old town, the Chiesa di Santa Maria Annunziata (once called Santa Maria degli Orti). In its single nave, it contains frescoes of great value produced during the 16th century by various artists, including Giovanni Pietro da Cemmo and Romanino. The frescoes also include, among various subjects, a danse macabre to the right of the altar.
- Hermitage of St. Peter and Paul, built in the second half of the 20th century, but originated in the 11th or 12th century, when Cluny monks came to Valcamonica.

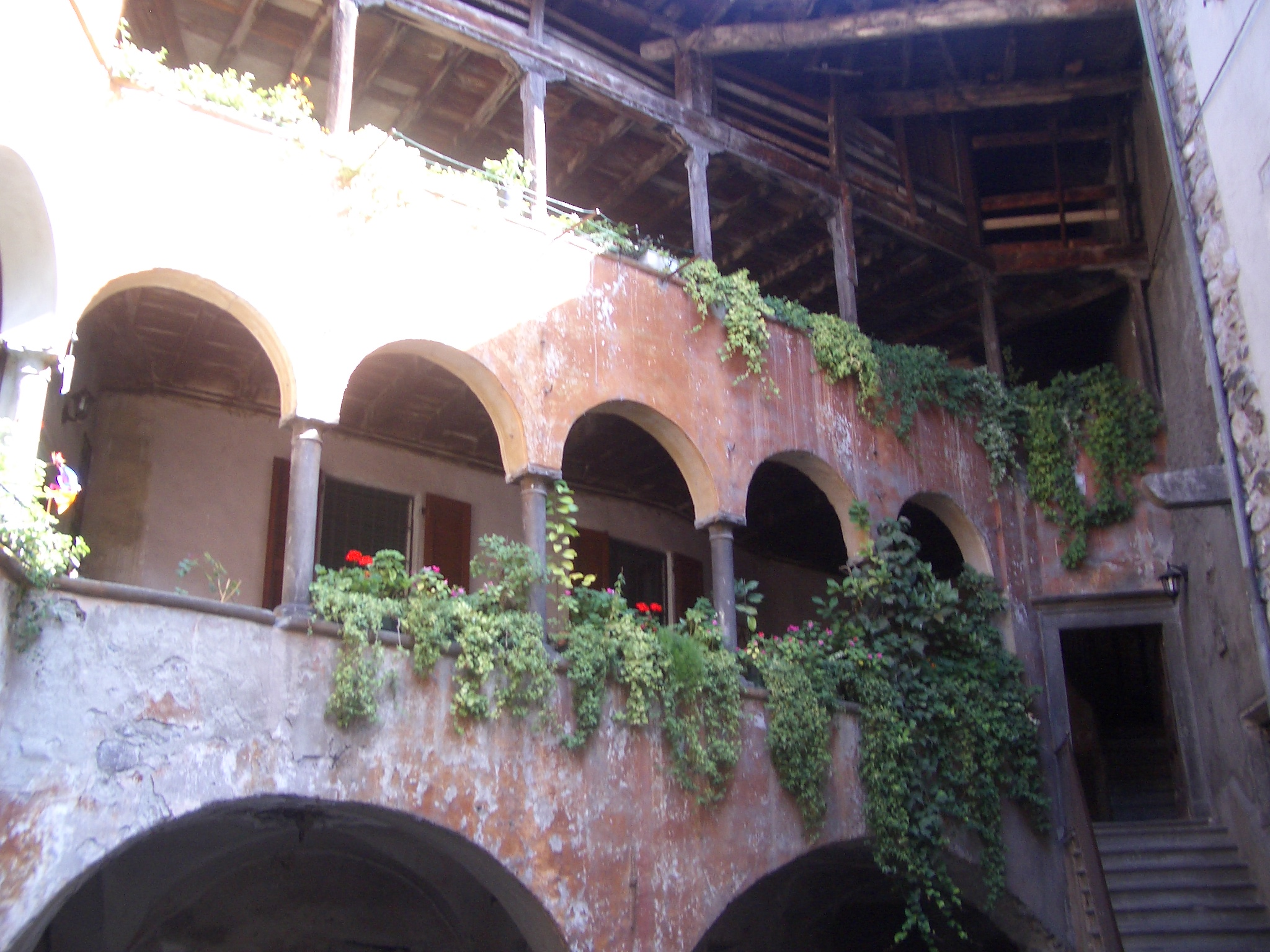
Casa Bettoni antico palazzo in Bienno

- Church of San Defendente on a hill at the north entrance of Bienno dating back to the 15th century.
- Church of St Peter ad Vincula (or San Peder Suc) of 16th century. It is built onto a Roman altar of Bacchus (hence the name St. Peter Succo) of which you can see the remains in the back of the building.
- Hill of Christ the King: there stands a monument to Christ the King, a golden statue erected in 1931.
- Chapel of the pools (Cappella delle piscine), dating back to the 15th century and reworked in the 17th century.

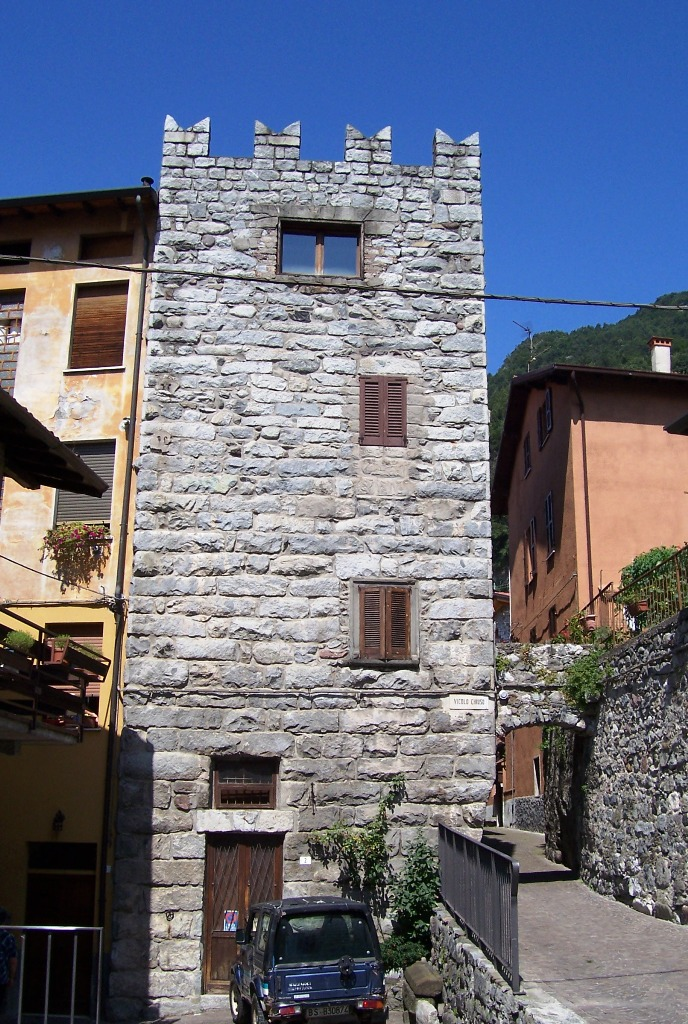
House-tower in Bienno

=== And also ===
- The House of Panteghini, built in 1483.
- The House of Bettoni dated of 1550.
- The Simoni-Fè Palace, was given in 1932 to the municipality by the Countess Paolina Fè of Ostiani Montholon

when she left, after a fatal hunting accident caused by her husband, Count Jean Charles Tristan de Montholon , son of Charles Tristan, marquis de Montholon, suspected to have poisoned the Emperor Napoleon, in Saint Helena, and brother of Hélène Napoleone Bonaparte de Montholon , whose father could be Napoleon and who lived 90 years,

with the exception of the usufruct of the lower floors, left to Liberata Fostinelli and Battista Panteghini and all their descendants ad vitam eternam, to reward them from their loyalty.

This usufruct has been transferred to the municipality of Bienno by their children Battista Panteghini, son of Liberata, and Maria Bettoni, whose family was the owner of the Palazzo Bettoni in Bienno, in 1988, because of the difficulties of maintenance and heating the palace, and their old age. It becomes the Public Library and a cultural center.

== Traditions and folklore ==
The scütüm are in camunian dialect nicknames, sometimes personal, elsewhere showing the characteristic features of a community. The one which characterize the people of Bienno is Padèle.

On 28 June, the eve of feast of Saints Peter and Paul, the villagers put an egg white in a bottle which they leave in the open air until the next morning; albumin coagulated in filaments then evokes the masts and sails of a boat, it is the boat of Saint Peter.

== Events ==
All buildings, museums and churches are open to the public every year, for a week, until midnight in August, during the village festival called Mostra Mercato former flour mill and forge are returned to service. This week welcomes thousands of visitors.

== Film ==
Mostra mercato 2014

== People ==
- Geltrude Comensoli (Bienno, 1847 - Bergamo, 1903), religious.
- Luigi Ercoli (Bienno, 1919 - Mauthausen, 1945), Italian partisan.
- Battistino Bonali (Bienno, 1962 - Huascarán, 1993), alpinist.

== Photo gallery ==
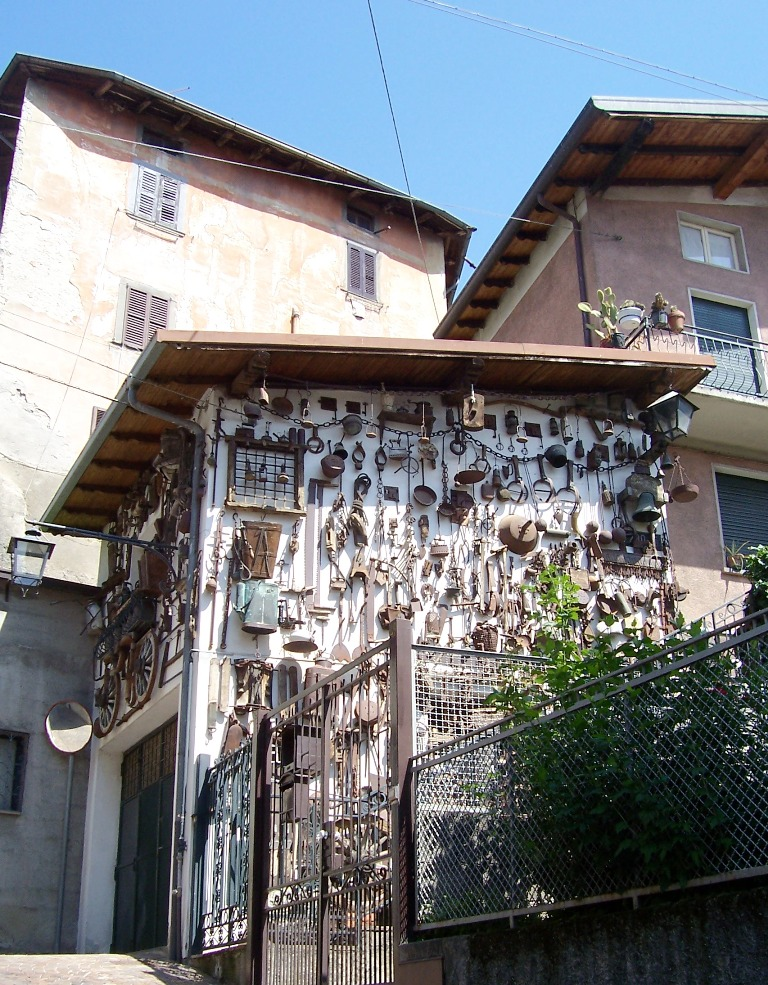
Casa e Fucina

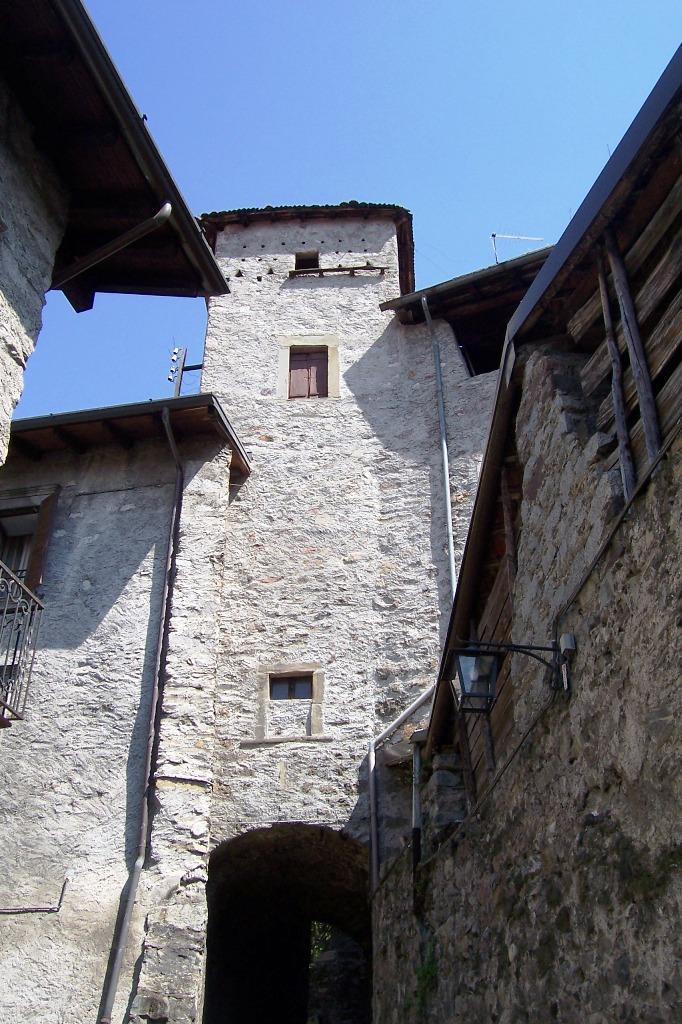
House Tower

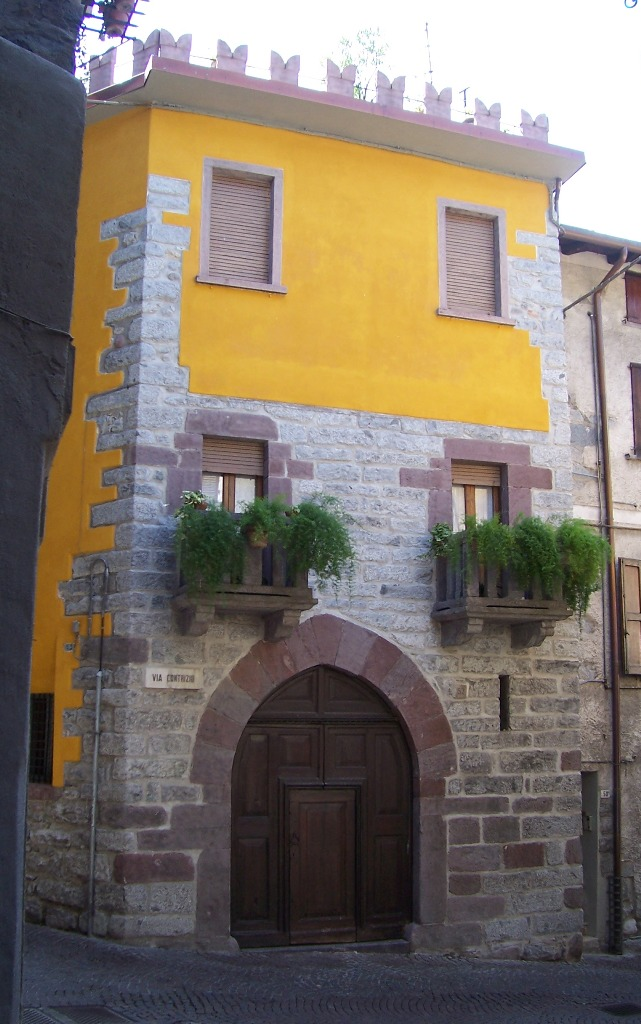
Another Tower

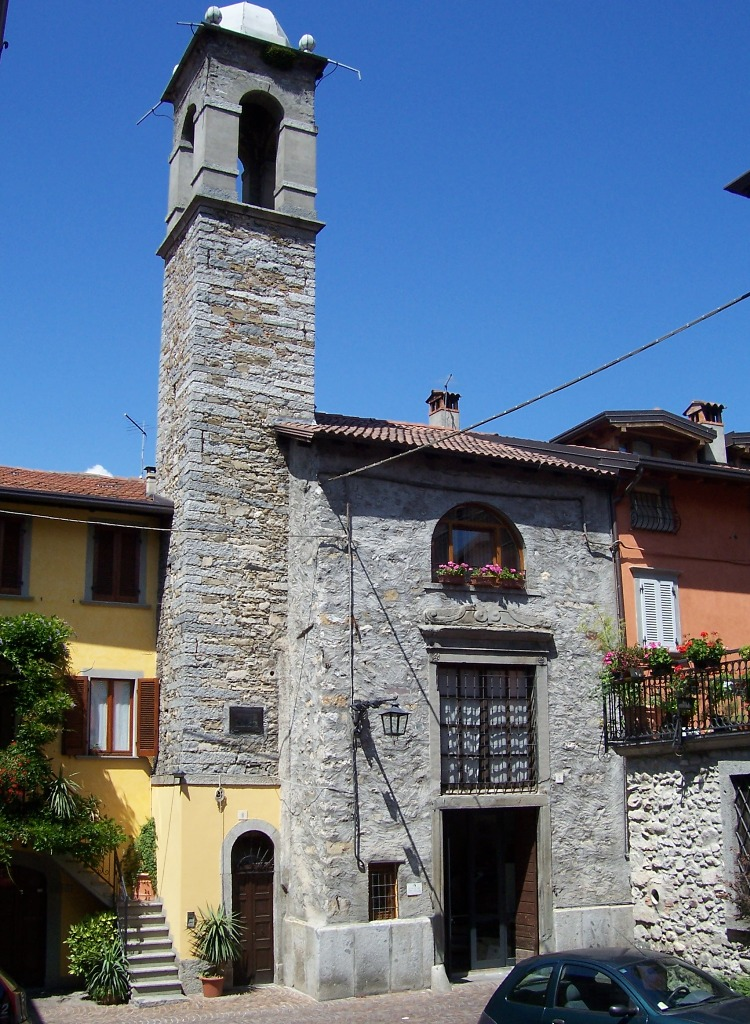
Oratorio de San Carlo Borromeo

Lavatoio on Vaso Re

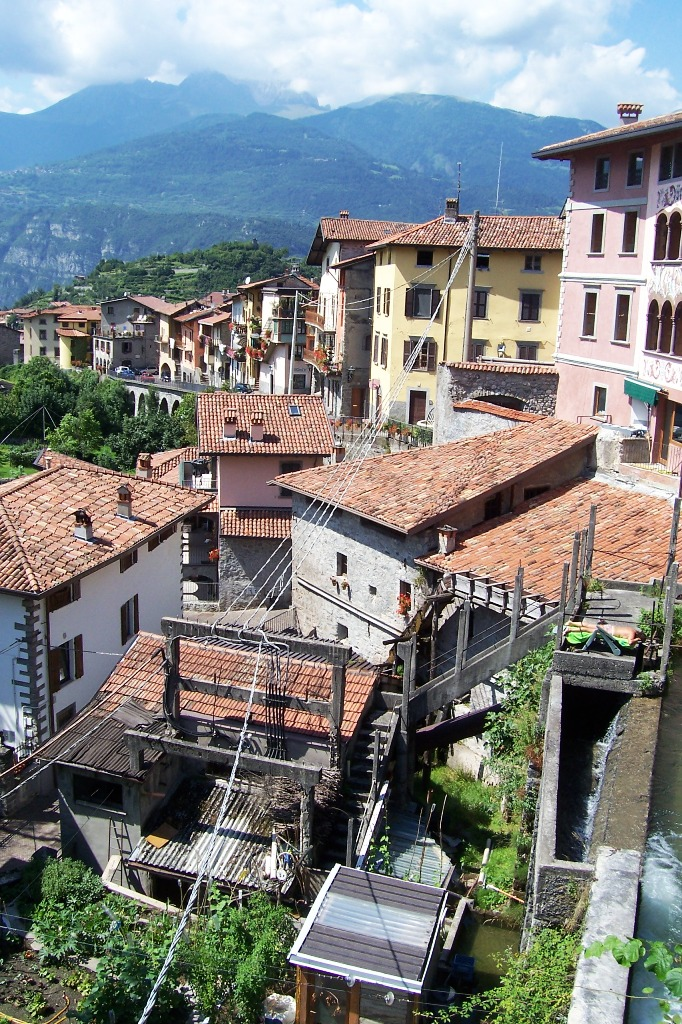
Panorama in the morning

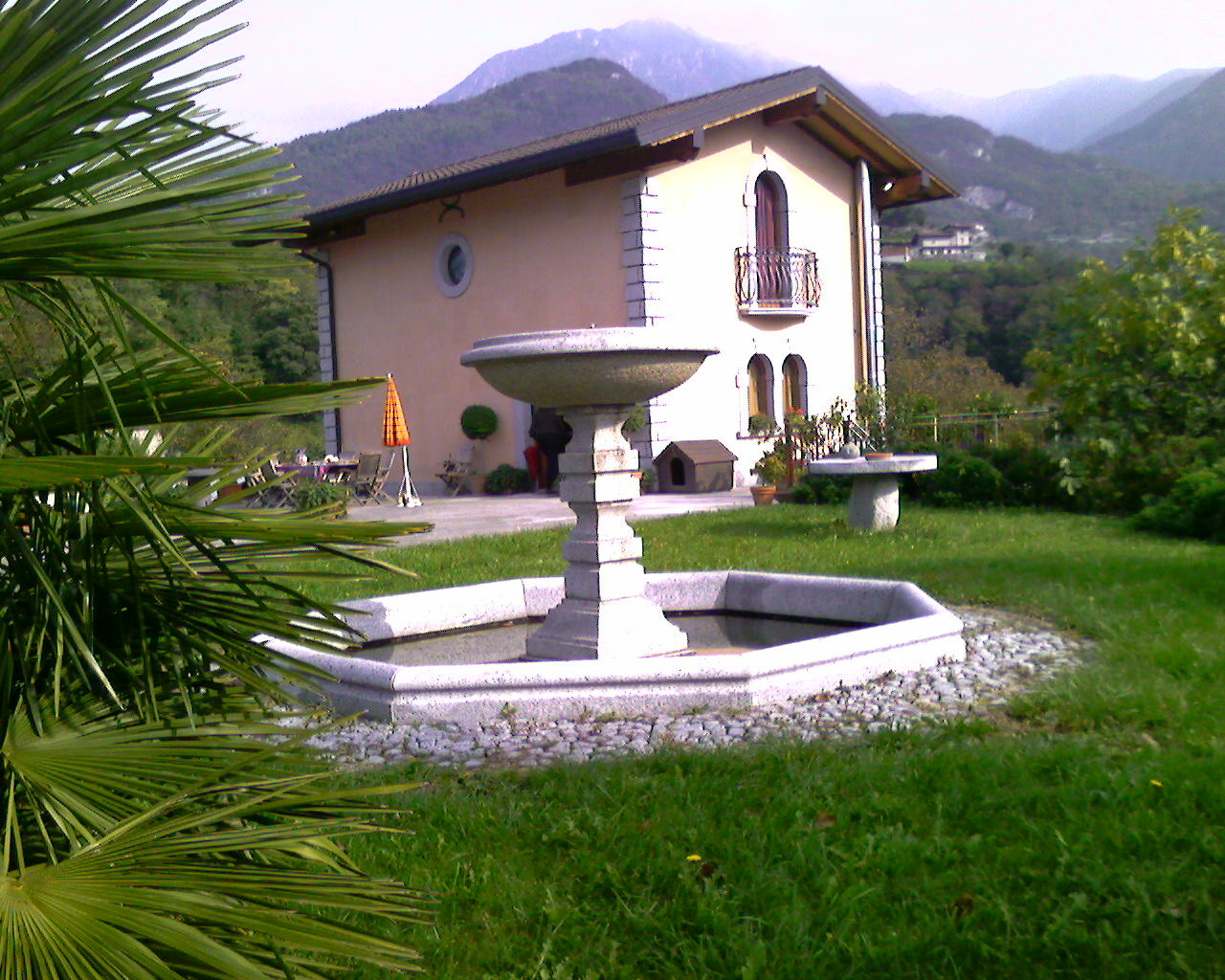
New Panteghini House at Inol (Berzo Inferiore)

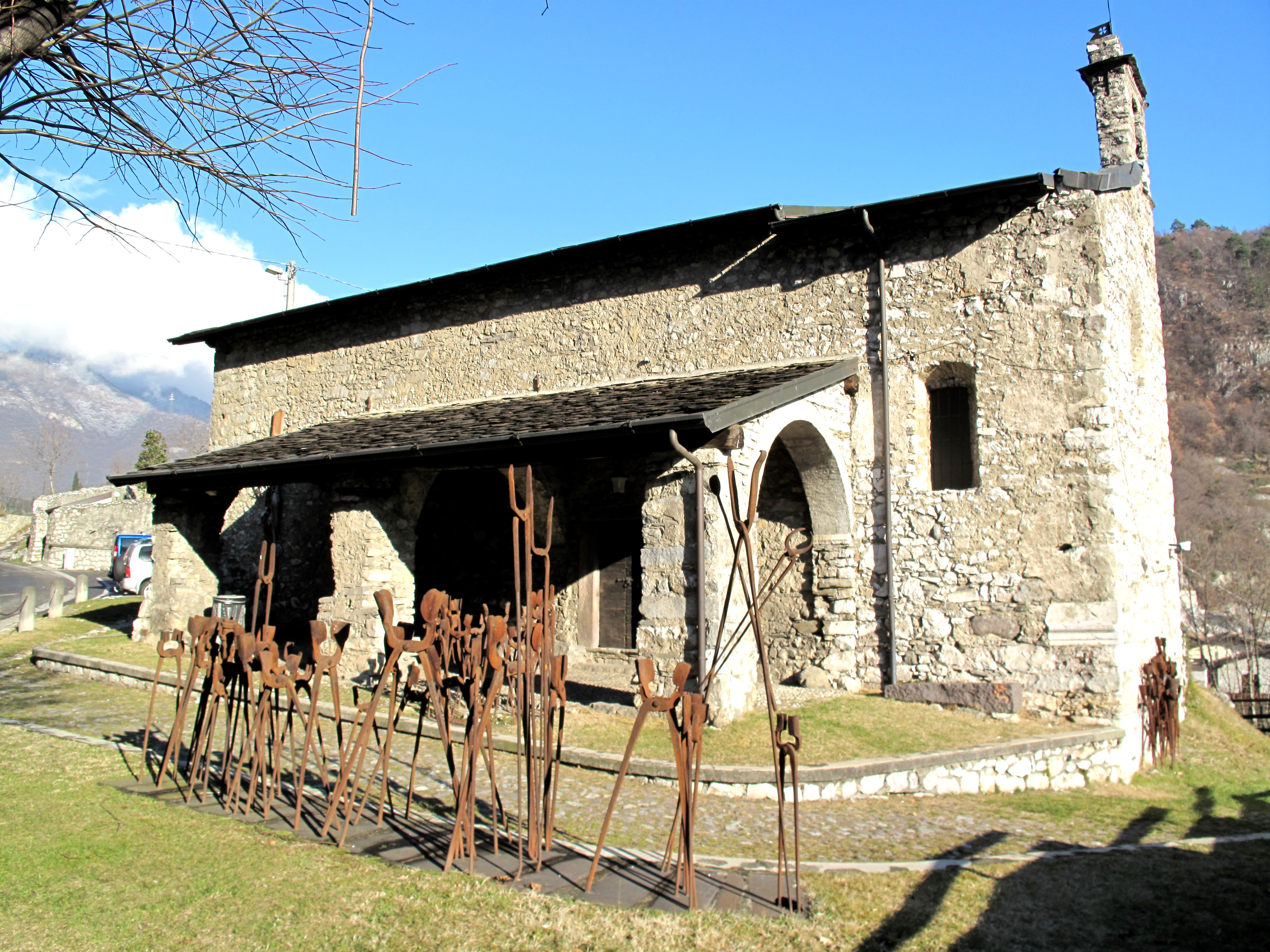
Chiesa San Pietro in Vincoli

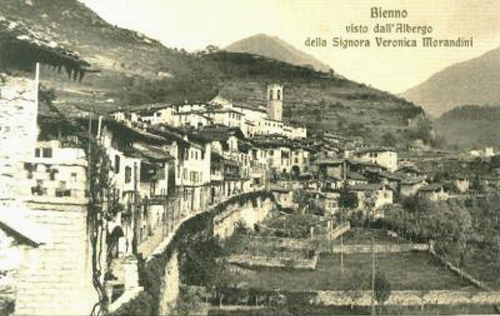
Old Bienno in 1930

== Sources ==
- Panazza, Gaetano; Araldo Bertolini (1984). Arte in Val Camonica - vol 4 (in Italian). Brescia: Industrie grafiche bresciane.
