= Santa Maria Annunciata, Bienno =

Roman Catholic church in Bienno, Italy

Church of the Annunciation Chiesa di Santa Maria Annunciata
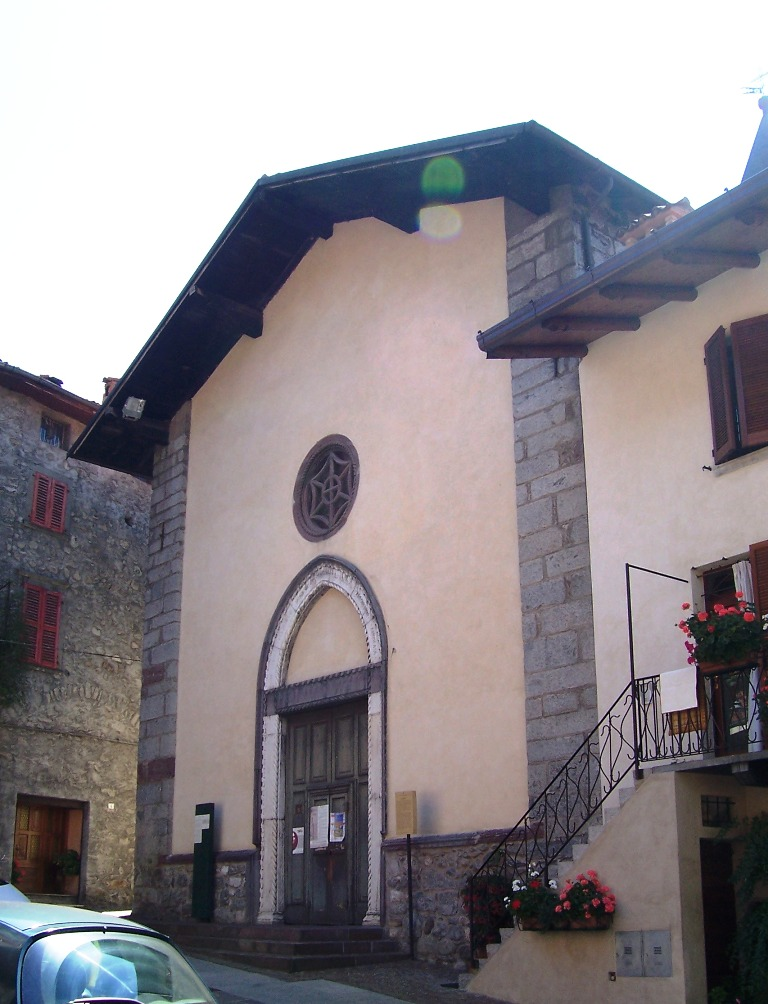
- Façade of the church.

Religion
- Affiliation: Roman Catholic
- Province: Brescia
- Ecclesiastical or organisational status: National monument
- Status: Active

Location
- Location: Bienno, Italy
- Interactive map of Church of the Annunciation; Chiesa di Santa Maria Annunciata
- Coordinates: 45.934444°N 10.295278°E

Architecture
- Type: Church

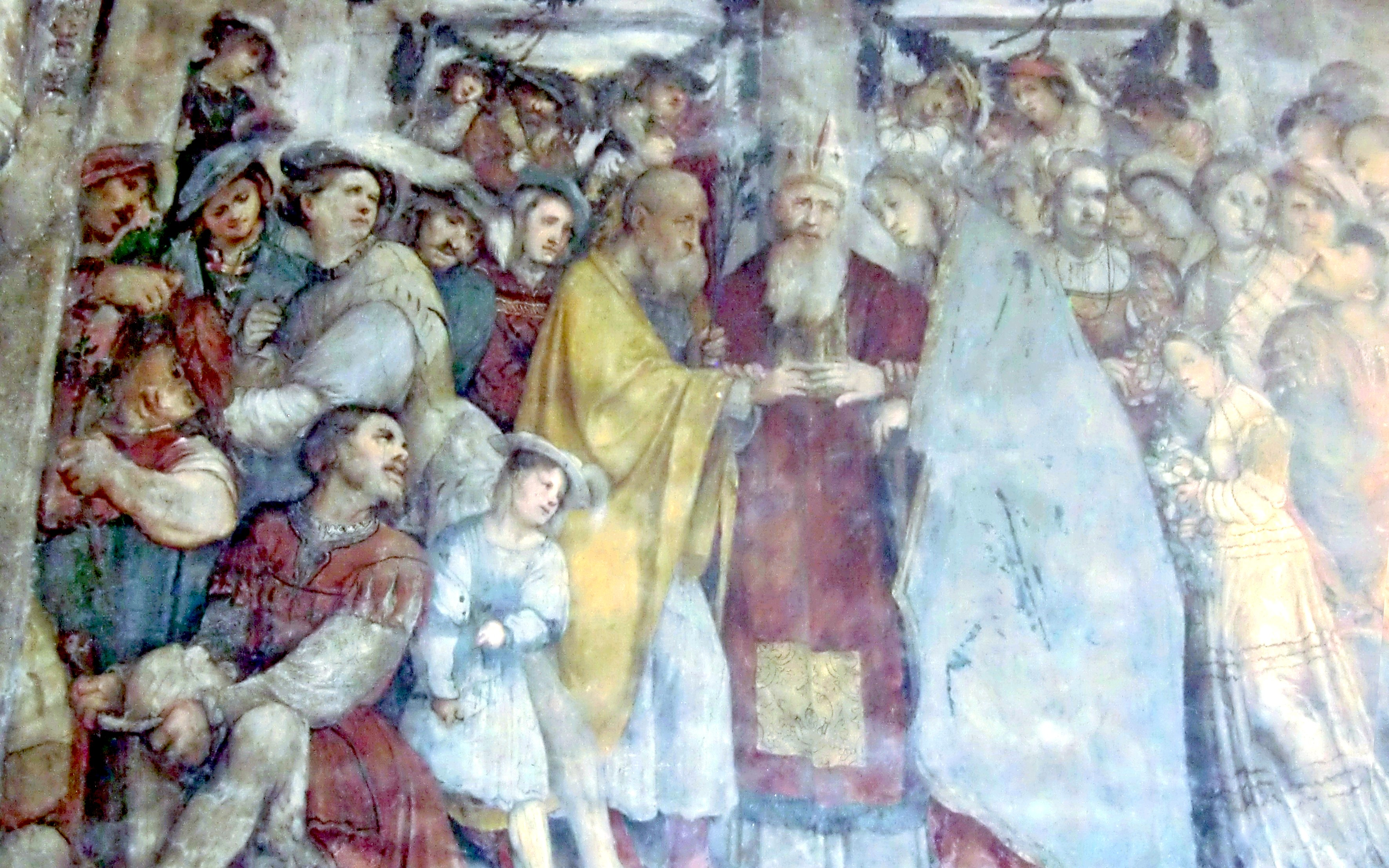
Frescos depicting the Marriage of the Virgin by Girolamo Romani

Church of the Annunciation (Italian: Chiesa di Santa Maria Annunciata is a Roman Catholic church in the town of Bienno, in the Province of Brescia, Lombardy, northern Italy.

The interior walls of the church contains numerous frescos from different periods that include a number of scenes of Madonna and Child, works by Giovanni Pietro da Cemmo and two scenes from the Life of Mary in the apse painted between 1537 and 1541 by Girolamo Romani.

== See also ==
- Giovanni Pietro da Cemmo
- Girolamo Romani
