= Panteghini =

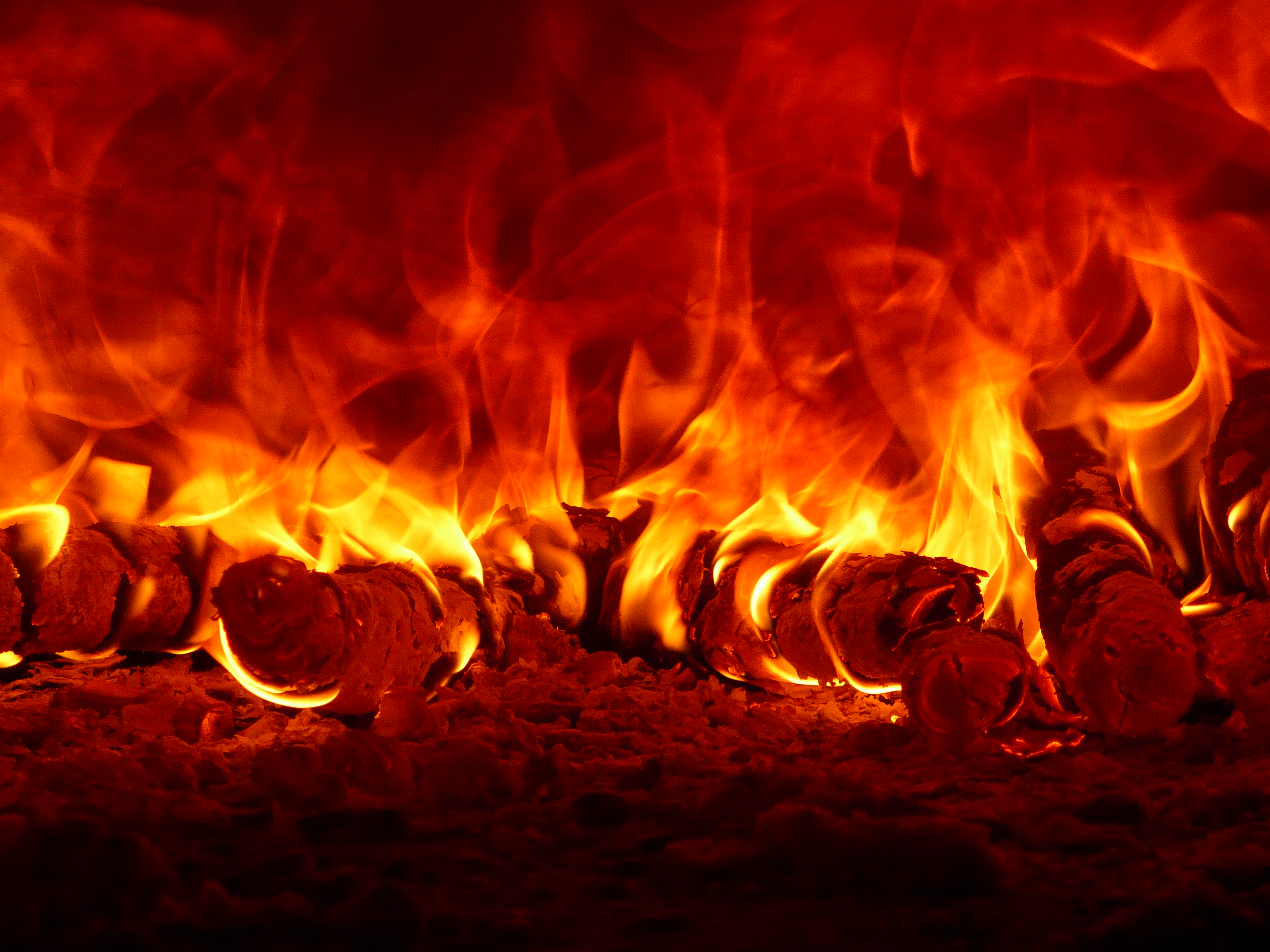
Aodh in Gaelic : Of Fire

The Panteghini family is an Italian family, with Camunni, proto-Celtic, established in Bienno, recognised as one of the 5 Most Beautiful Villages of Italy, near the city of Brescia, in Val Camonica, Lombardy.

Its etymological origin could be both Greek (Πάντε = all) and Latin (Genus = origin, genus, species), and could mean " from all origins " by its European multi-cultural roots already in the twelfth and thirteenth centuries .

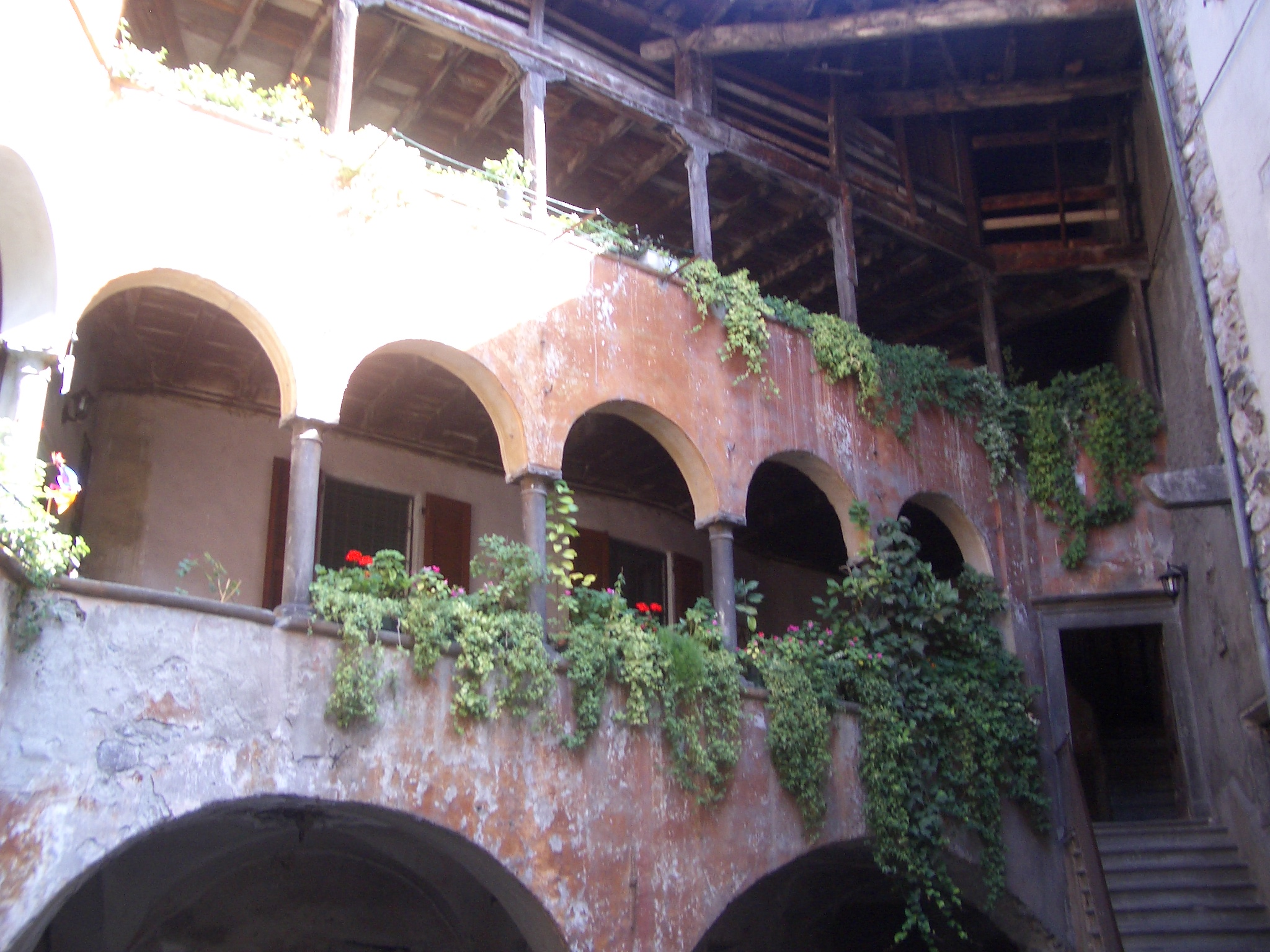
Casa Bettoni antico palazzo in Bienno

In 1483, the Signor Panteghini, coming from the Republic of Venice, according to legend, at the time of annexation of Val Camonica, settles in Bienno, and build his House, the Casa Panteghini.

In 1932, Contess Paolina d'Ostia Fè Montholon disappears, after a fatal hunting accident, in the pine forest, caused by her husband, the Count Charles Jean Tristan de Montholon,

- descendant from François de Montholon (v. 1480–1543), 1st Paris Parlement's president, Garde des sceaux of France in 1542
- son of Charles Tristan, marquis de Montholon, suspected to have poisoned Napoleon, but this allegation remains contradicted by some historians. However, it could have been another reason, his wife Albine probably being returned from Saint Helena with an illegitimate child of Napoleon.
- and brother of Hélène Charlotte Napoléone Bonaparte de Montholon, whose father could be Napoleon,

and let the inferiors floors of their palace Simoni-Fè, whose motto of Simoni Coat of Arms is Fides, to their parents and confidence people, family Panteghini, Liberata Fostinelli et Battista Panteghini, and all their progeny ad vitam eternam, to thank them for their loyalty .

Àt the same time, their son Battista married Maria Bettoni, whose family owns another Quattrocento palazzo, the Casa Bettoni .

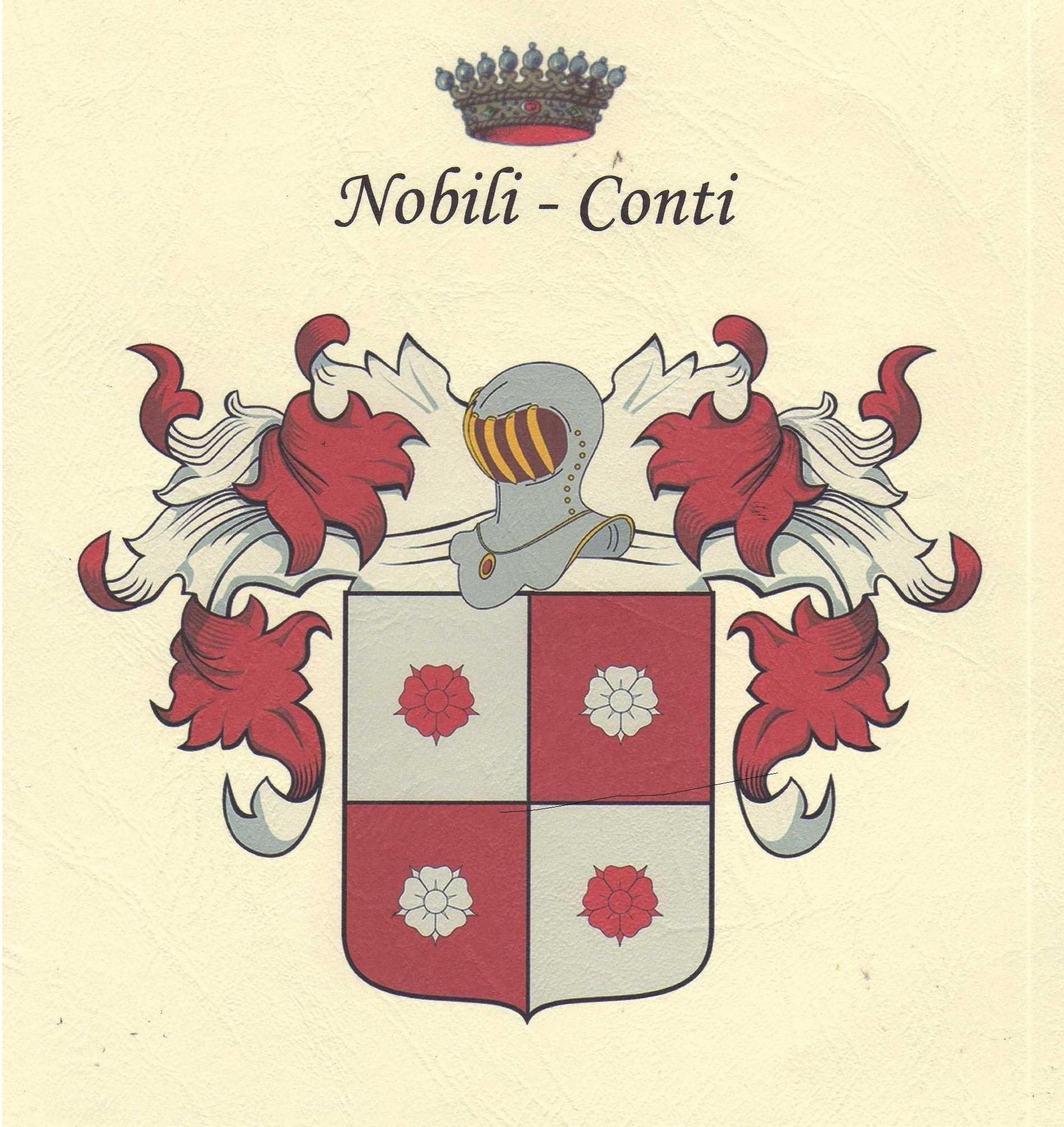
un écu écartelé d'argent et de gueules avec quatre roses sur les quartiers de l'un en l'autre

The coat of arms The house of Bettoni of Venice, already allied to the family of Ostia Fè in 1852, is a quartered shield of silver and red with four roses neighborhoods one by the other, (two silver roses and two red roses.

Lorenzo Bettoni was knighted in 1684 for funding 10 000 ducats the first, financing the war of Republic of Venice against the Turks of the Ottoman Empire.

The Palazzo Simoni-Fè usufruct of the inferior floors is left in 1988 to the city of Bienno, and it becomes the municipal library and a cultural center.

Padre Antonio Panteghini is elected General Superieur of the Congregation of the Sacred Heart of Jesus from 1979 to 1991 in Rome and cited as one of the most important personalities of the year 2015, of Brescia.

In 2000, Doctor Vanessa Panteghini, whose paternal grandmother is Maria Bettoni, issues the alert of the Vincennes pediatric cancer case.

== Links ==
- The house of Bettoni
- Venice
- Bienno
