= Church of Santa Maria Assunta (Esine) =

Catholic church in Esine, Italy

Chiesa di Santa Maria Assunta
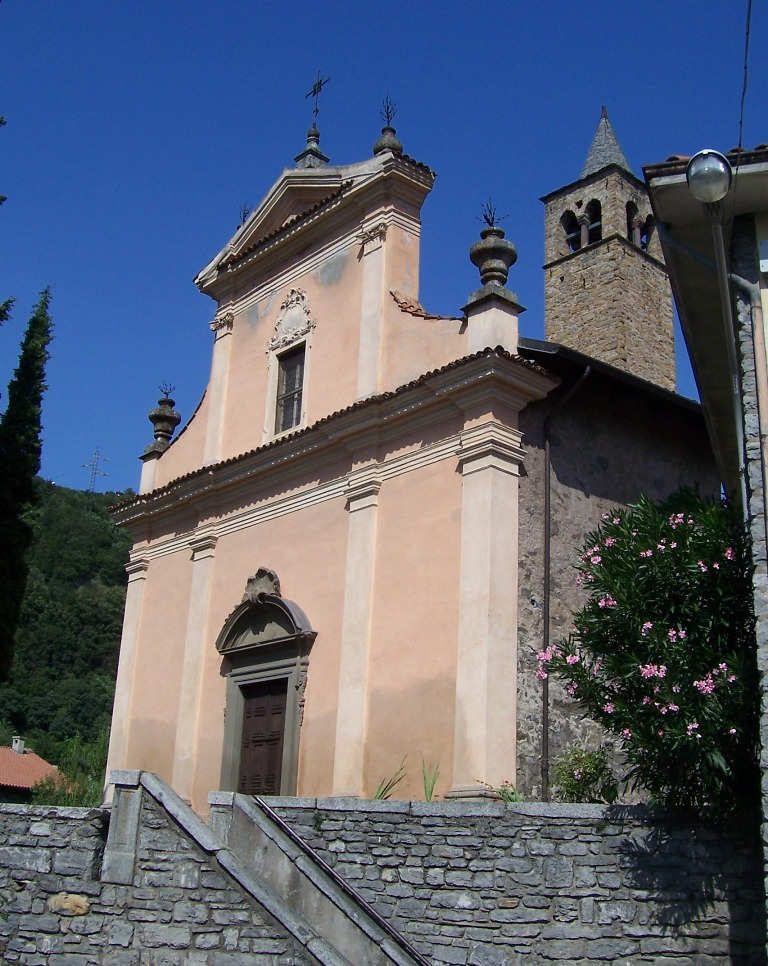
- Church of Santa Maria Assunta in Esine

Religion
- Affiliation: Catholic
- Province: Brescia

Location
- Municipality: Esine
- State: Italy
- Interactive map of Chiesa di Santa Maria Assunta
- Coordinates: 46°01′53″N 10°20′28″E

Architecture
- Direction of façade: west

Santa Maria Assunta is a church in the north-west of Esine, in the province of Brescia, northern Italy, listed as national monument.

The building was originally constructed around 1480, and initially had a gabled façade with a round window (oculo), replaced by the current structure in 1776. The bell tower dates from 1500 and is built in a yellow stone.

The interior has a single nave, and was apparently completely decorated with frescoes by Giovanni Pietro da Cemmo between 1491 and 1493: subjects include the Annunciation, Mary enthroned, the history of salvation and the holy helpers. The paintings were commissioned by the noble families of Federici and Beccagutti, and by Isaac de Favis of Gandino, rector of the church of the Holy Trinity in Esine.

Beyond the chancel arch the cross vault of the presbytery bears in its centre a depiction of Christ Pantocrator in a mandorla, over three meters high, surrounded by a crowd of 72 characters arranged in distinct classes: saints, martyrs, patriarchs, emperors, prophets, and so on. On the back wall of the chancel is painted the Crucifixion.

In 1573 a section of wall was knocked down to build the Chapel of the Rosary, destroying the fresco, which probably represented a Last Judgement.

== Gallery ==
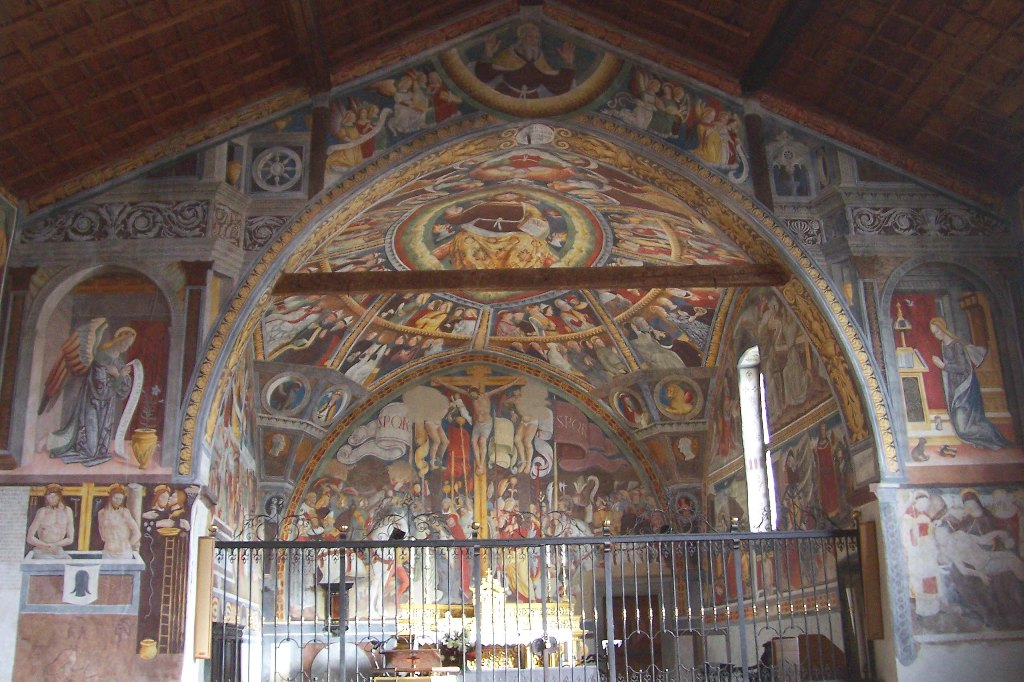
Presbytery

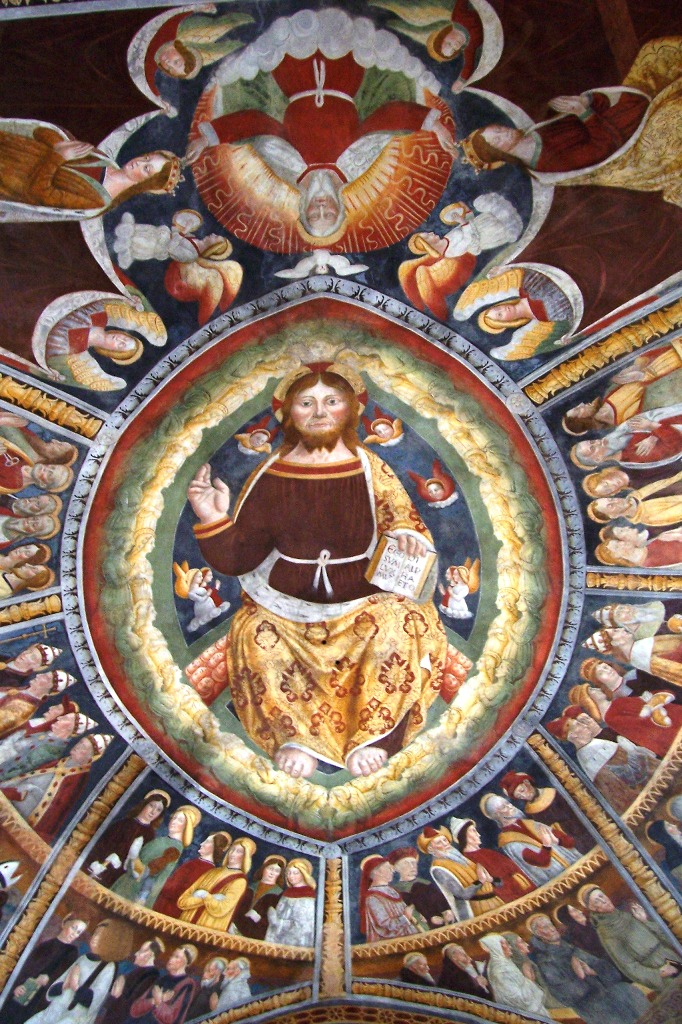
Christ Pantocrator

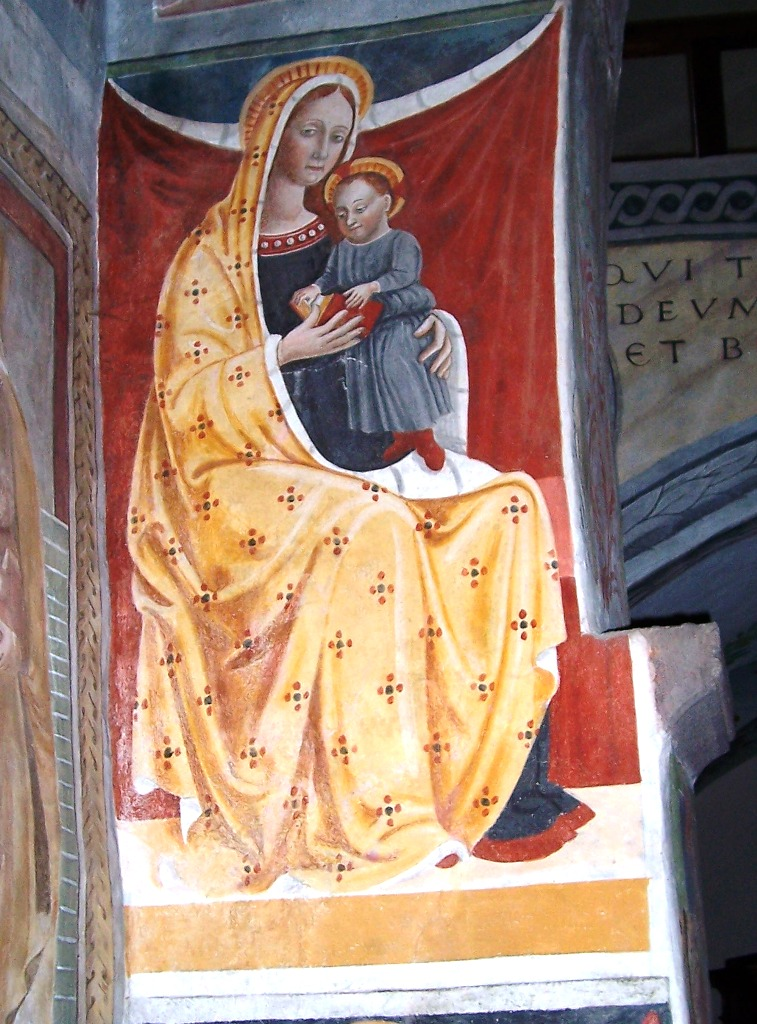
Mary enthroned

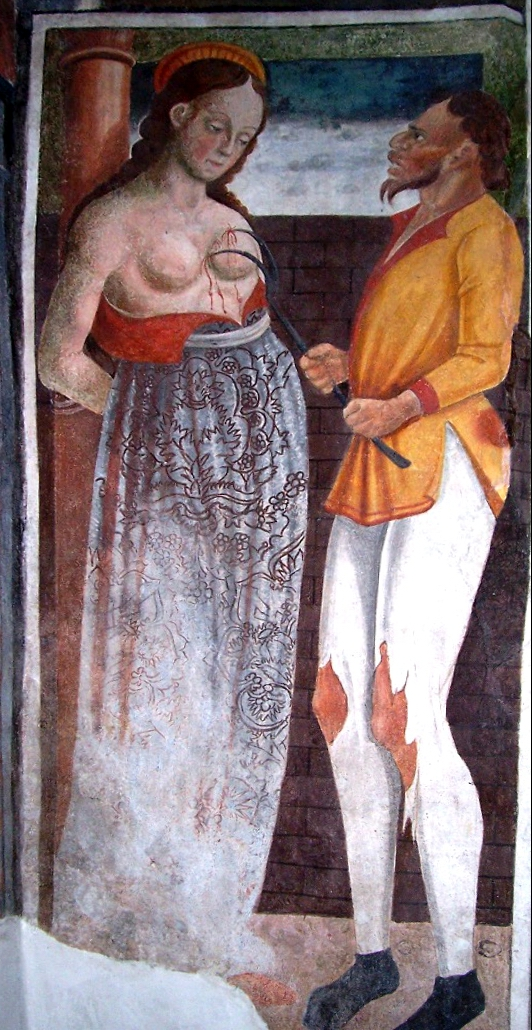
The martyrdom of Saint Agatha

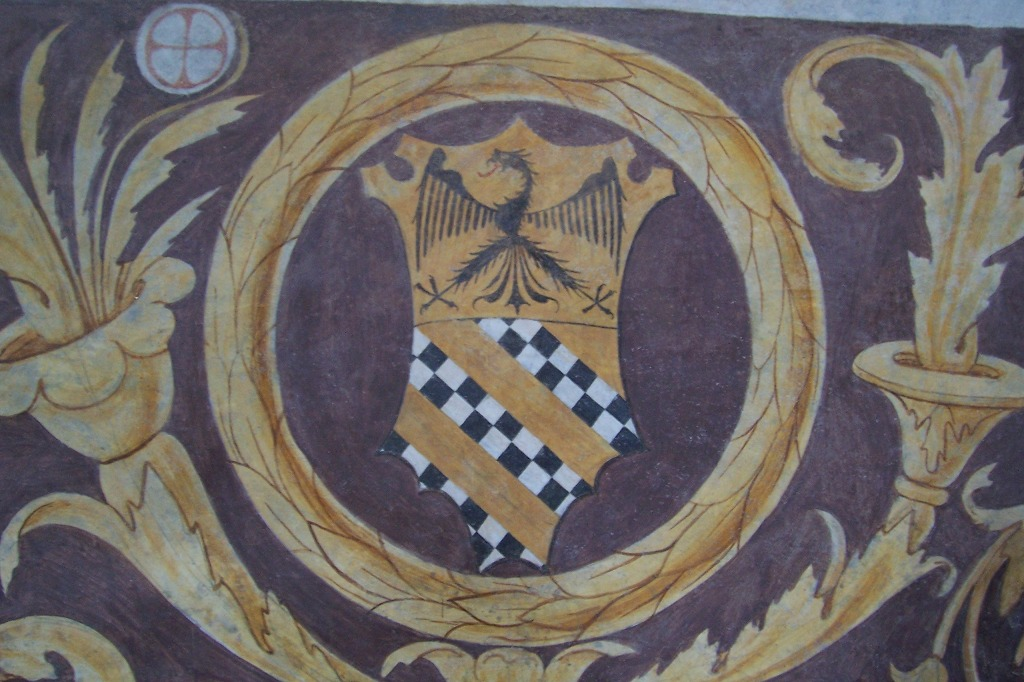
Coat of arms of the Federici family

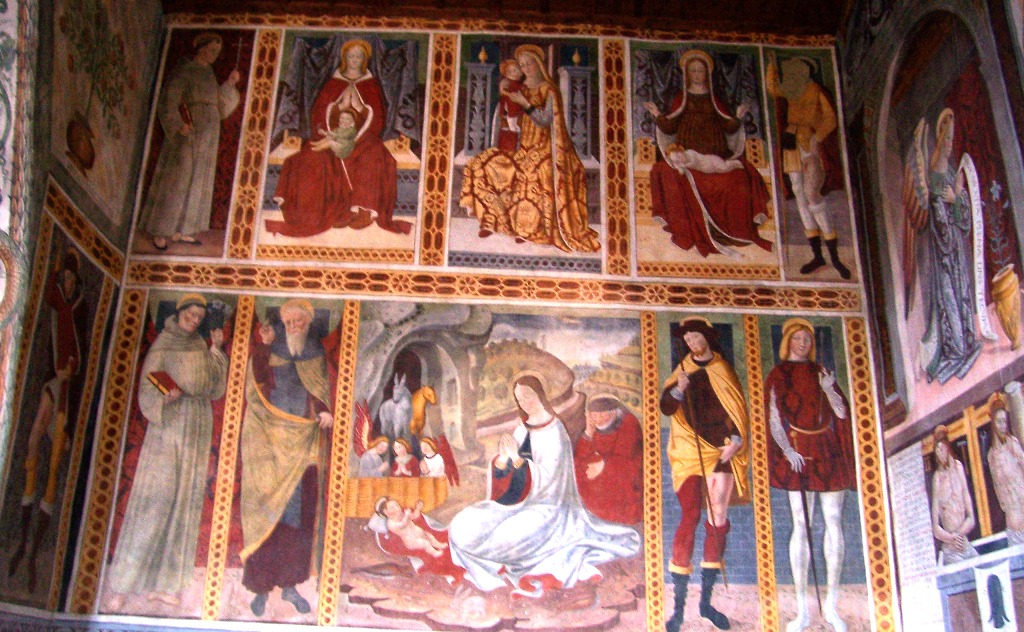
Saints

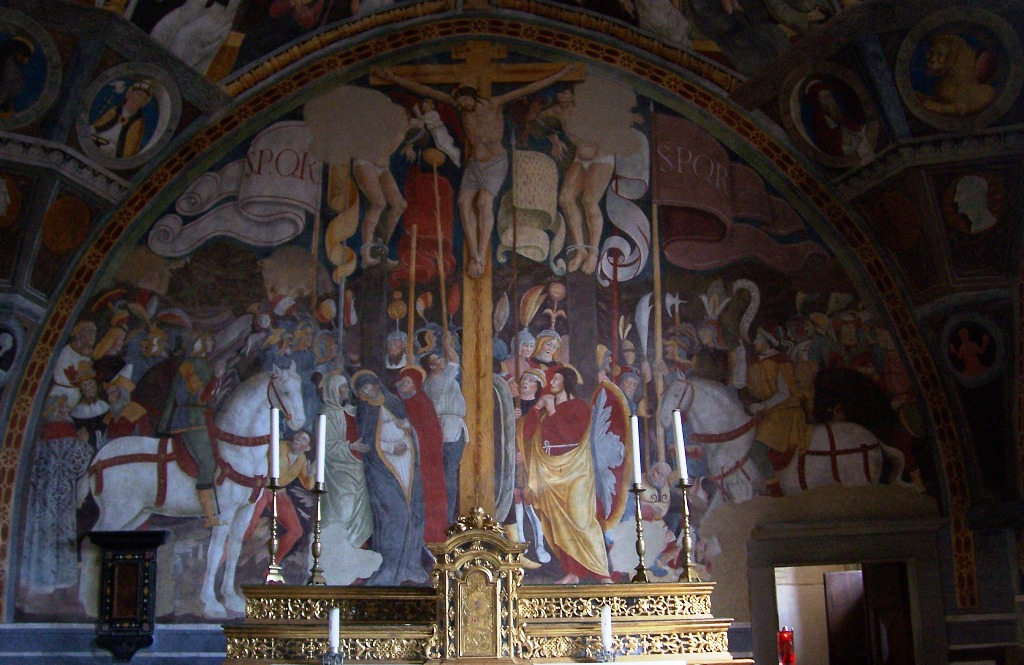
Crucifixion, at the back of the presbytery

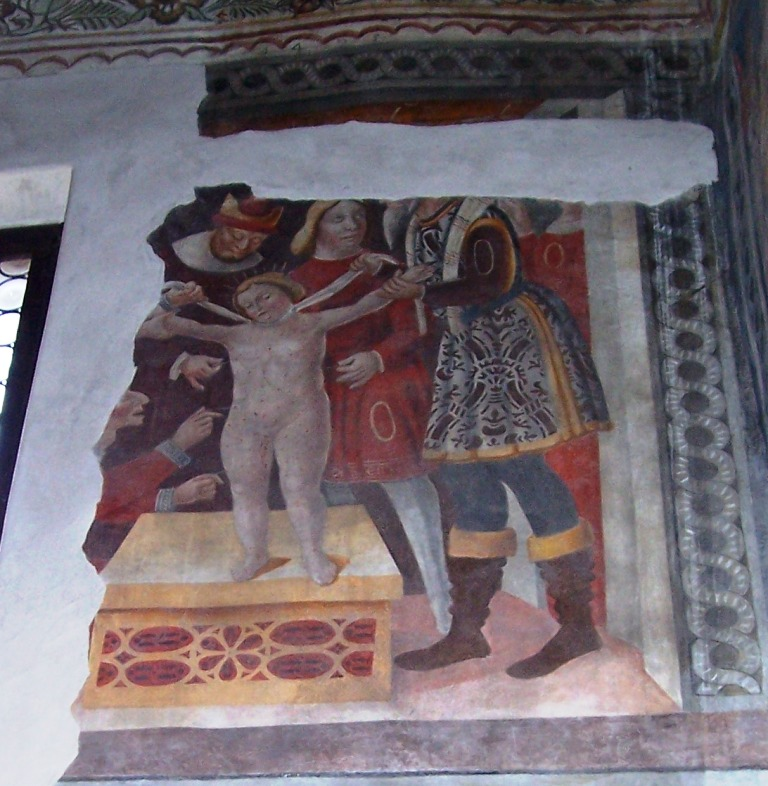
Simon of Trent

== Sources and external links ==
- "Magda Stofler, Santa Maria Assunta on "Itinera 6 - Architettura e pittura"". Archived from the original on 2008-08-02.
