= Boat of Saint Peter =

Italian Catholic folk tradition

Boat of Saint Peter Barca di San Pietro
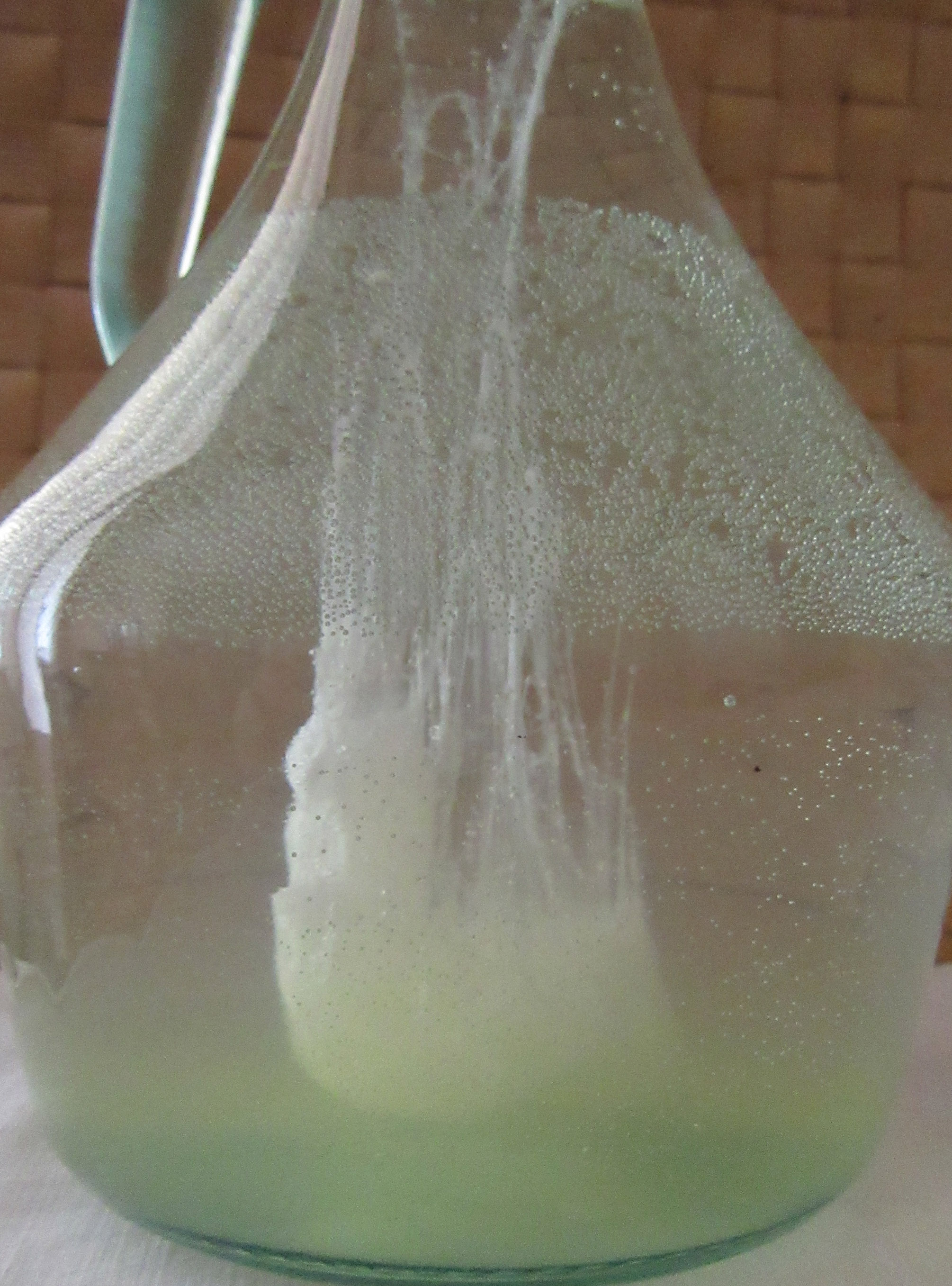
- Example of a boat of Saint Peter
- Genre: Folklore of Italy
- Frequency: Annually
- Locations: Friuli-Venezia Giulia, Veneto, Trentino, Lombardy, Liguria and Piedmont
- Country: Italy
- Most recent: 29 June 2020

The boat of Saint Peter (Italian: barca di san Pietro) is a popular rural tradition prevalent in northern Italy, particularly in the geographical area of Friuli-Venezia Giulia, Veneto, Trentino, Lombardy, Liguria and Piedmont. This tradition is also widespread in certain valleys and territories of north-west Tuscany: Garfagnana and Val di Lima (province of Lucca), Valleriana (province of Pistoia) and Galciana (province of Prato).

The tradition dates back to the cult of Saint Peter, widespread in northern Italy from the 18th century, thanks to the Benedictines monks. In certain regions and in other variants, the same tradition also spread for 24 June, the feast of Saint John the Baptist.

The origin of the belief is linked to atmospheric phenomena since they are important for agricultural crops or for fishing.

== History ==
On 28 June, the Saints Peter and Paul's eve, people put an egg white in a bottle which they leave on the windowsill in the open air until the next morning; albumin, coagulated in filaments, resembles the masts and sails of a boat. According to popular folklore, the effect is produced by Saint Peter, who, whilst blowing in the glass container would make the egg white take the shape of a boat. According to some traditions, the container must be left in the open air overnight to absorb dew.

By observing the aspect of the "sails", if they are very tight or closed, according to the legend, one could receiving good or bad information about what the agrarian year would be, or from one's own destiny. In the Garfagnana and the middle Serchio valley, during the years of emigration, the result of this tradition was also interpreted as an answer for the sea voyage of those who were preparing to leave for the Americas.

== Physics ==
The phenomenon is due to the thermal variations between day and night, also compared to the ground on which the bottle is placed, typical of the first summer time, which lends itself well to these conditions (provided that the earth has warmed up the eve). In fact, it can also be performed on other days or nights during this period.

The cold humidity at night should slightly vary the density of albumin which, similar to water, should increase slightly, therefore falling slowly on the bottom of the glass container. Likewise, the bottom, in contact with the heat of the ground on which it rests, should raise the water molecules upwards, by small convective movements, and create the effect of the veils of egg white.

To this event is also added the effect of the first hours of the morning: here, the albumin must heat again, thus considerably reducing its density and therefore trying to go up, hoisting, so to speak, the sails.

== Proverbs ==
Some Venetian proverbs relate to the feast of Saints Peter and Paul (English translations are in parentheses):

- "L'è vero, l'è vero l'è rivà la barca de San Piero." ("It's true, it's true, saint Peter's boat come true")
- "Se piove a San Paolo e Piero piove per un anno intero." ("If the rain for Saints Peter and Paul comes here, it rains for a whole year")

== See also ==
- Saint Peter
- Berzo Demo
- Bienno
