= Cemmo =

Coordinates: 46.0278°N 10.3347°E

Cemmo, (camunian dialect: Hèm) is a frazione of Capo di Ponte, located right of river Oglio, beneath the Concarena.

It was one of the first settlements in Val Camonica, as it can be deduced from the numerous rock drawings that have been found here; nowadays it has a population of about 600.

It hosts the Pieve of Saint Syrus.

== Territory ==
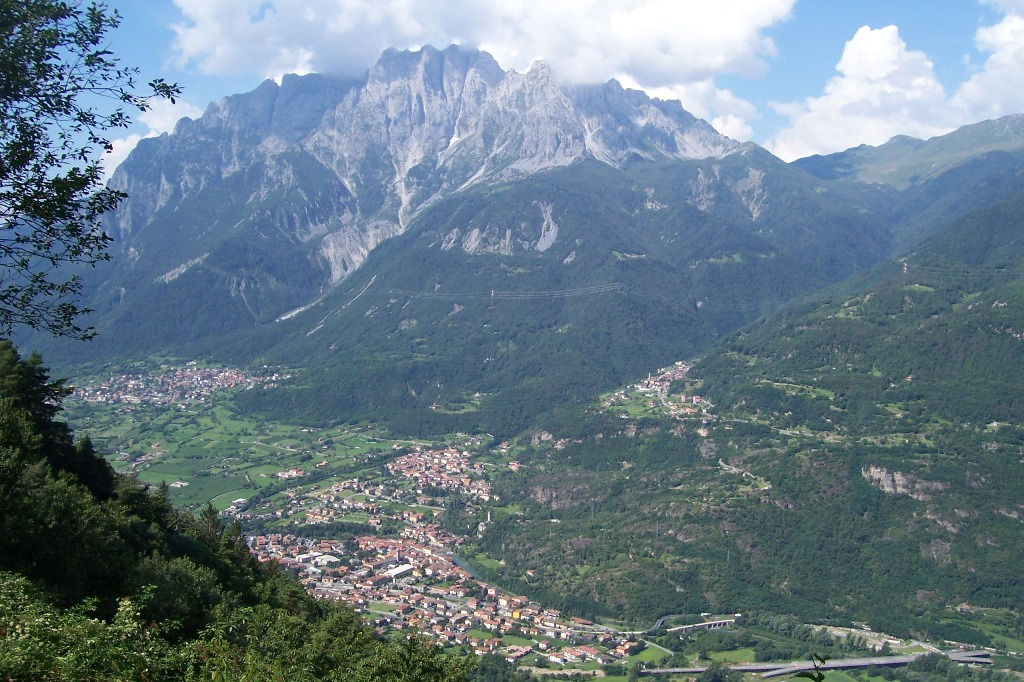
Cemmo as seen from Paspardo

The town is located on the right side of river Oglio, north of Clegna creek.

== History ==
=== Local feudal lords ===
Noble families which obtained feoffment on the town from the local bishop:

Family	Period
Avogadro	1206 -
Botelli	1336 -
Della Torre	1423 -

== Historic center ==
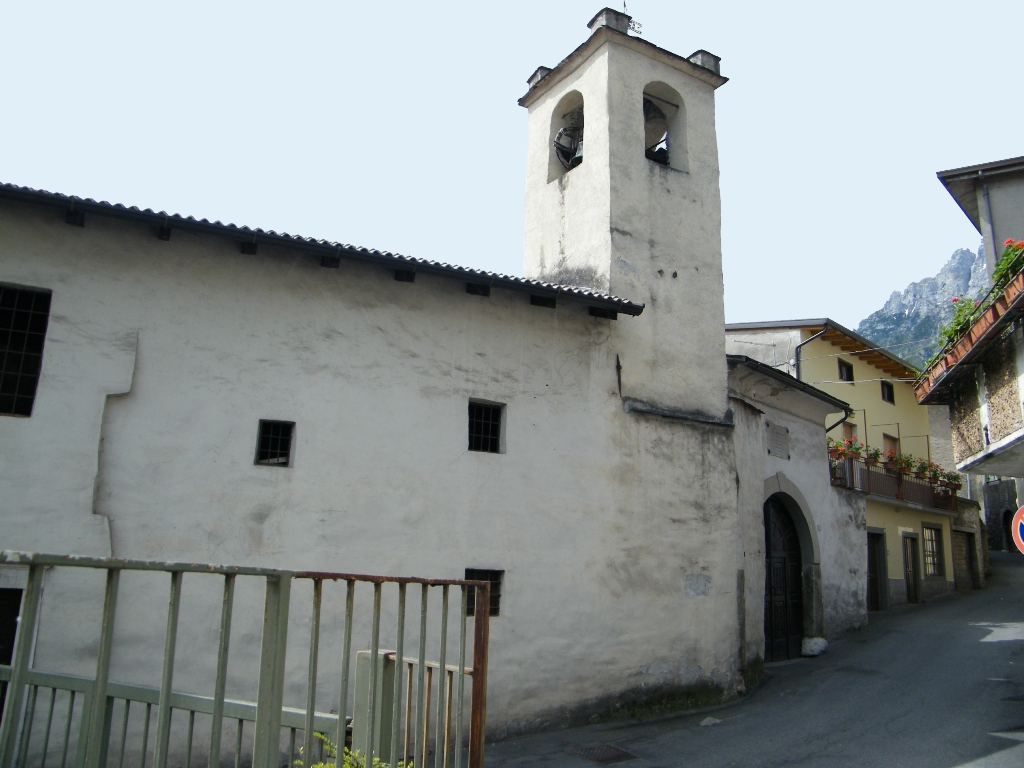
St. Bartholomew's Church of the Umiliati

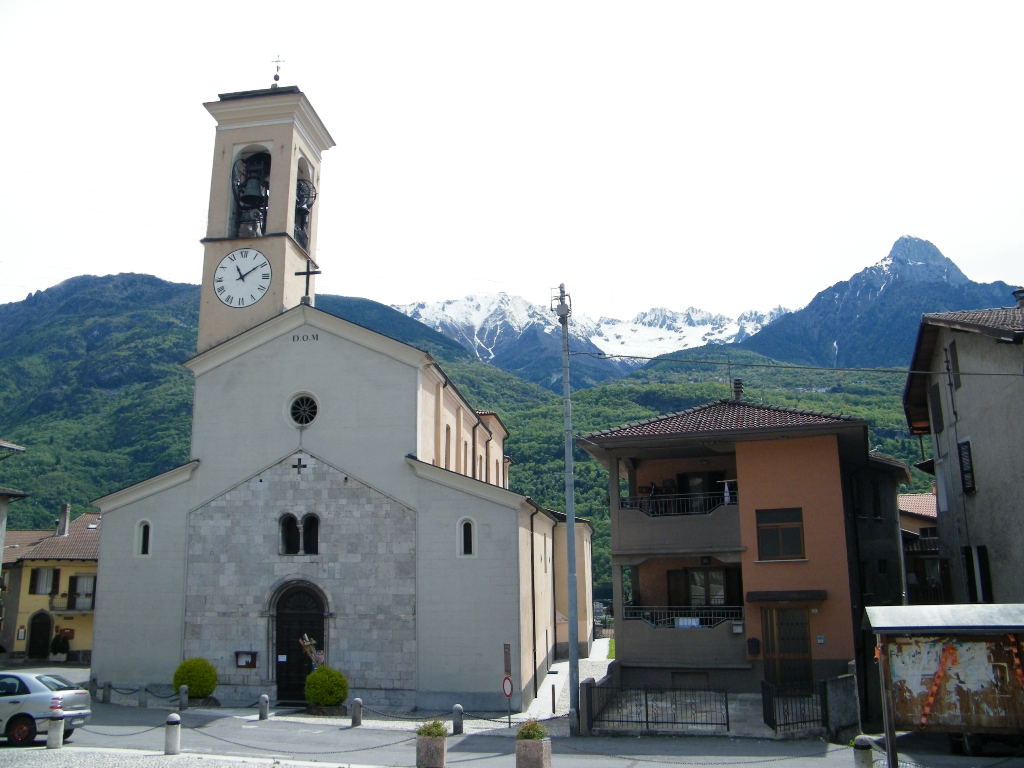
Parish church of Saint Stephen.

The historic center of Cemmo hosts many old buildings with numerous portals, gable roofs and courtyards. The town originally possessed four main defensive doors that give the name to the annual event "4 Porte 4 Piazze" ("4 doors, 4 squares"). The town's main squares are:

Just beyond it is the district "Furen," a group of old houses located in the vicinity of the remains of an ancient furnace, living examples of traditional rural camuna. On the opposite bank of the river Clegna covers a green area in the countryside, called "Inimara", full of paths and streets with "orchards" (small gardens fenced).

- Morciuolo square, which holds an old fountain with traditional blanket washing;
- Pietro da Cemmo square, home of the parish church dedicated to St. Stephen;
- the small square on Via San Faustino, before the church of Santa Maria;
- Spiazzo della Berlina ("clearing of the limousine"), so named because it used to host the public processes; here was located the old town hall of Cemmo.

Much of the town's upper area is occupied by the Sisters of St. Dorothy's private school and the adjacent convent dedicated to Annunciata Cocchetti.

Just beyond it is located the "Furen" contrada, a group of old houses located next to the remains of an ancient furnace, living examples of traditional camunian architecture.

On the opposite bank of the Clegna creek covers a green area in the countryside, called "Inimara", full of paths and streets with broli (small orchards).

== Monuments and places of interest ==
=== Religious architecture ===
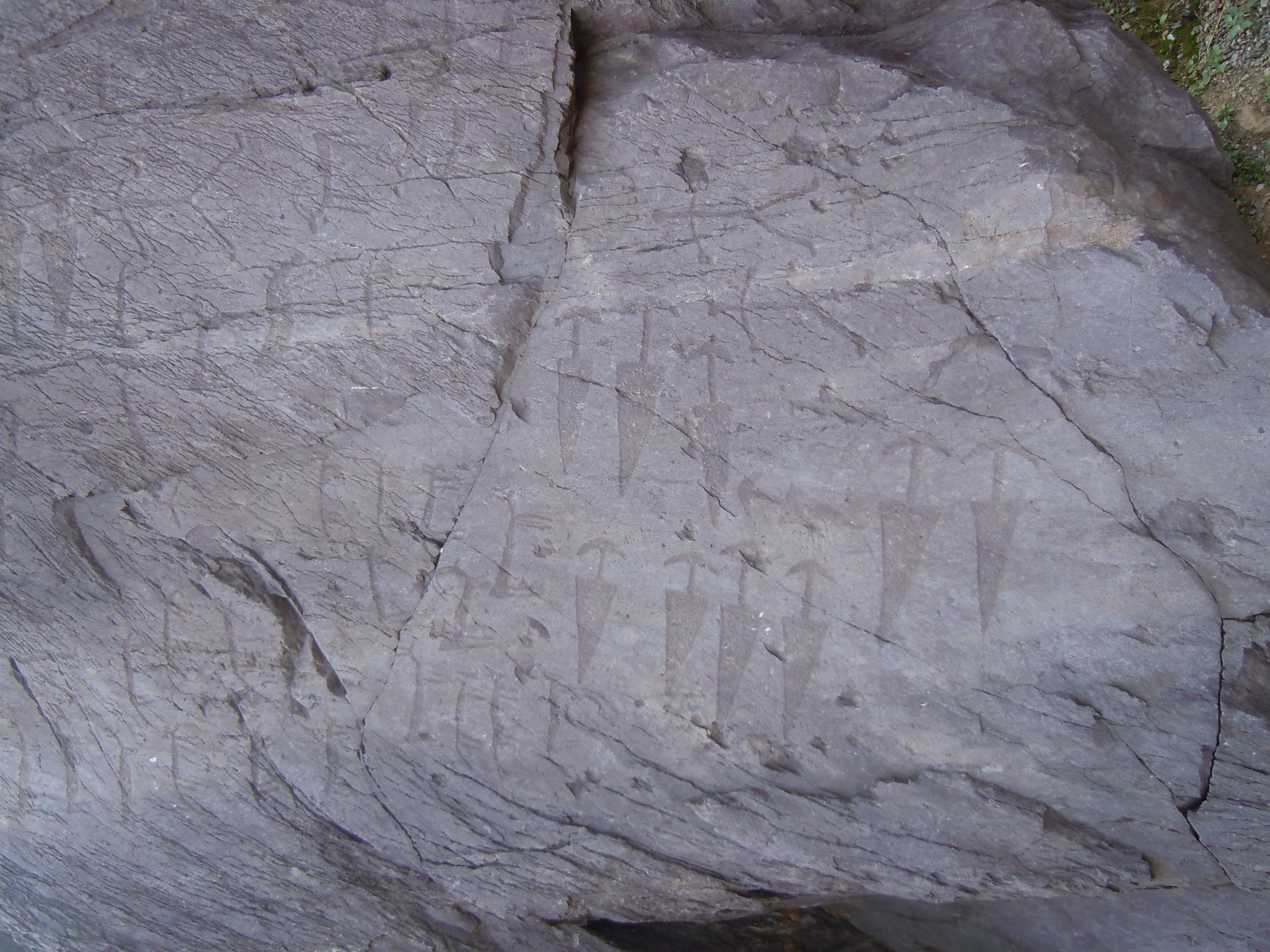
Masso Cemmo 2; inscriptions.

Cemmo's churches are:

- Parish church of Saint Stephen, 16th century, Lombard-Romanesque architecture.
- Church of Santa Maria and Elizabeth, situated on a cliff over the Clegna creek, 12th-13th century.
- St. Bartholomew's Church of the Umiliati, 13th century. It was alienated by the suppression of the order in 1570.
- Pieve of Saint Syrus, Romanesque age, overlooking the Oglio river.

There's also a small church inside the cloister.

=== UNESCO Heritage Sites ===
- Parco archeologico comunale di Seradina-Bedolina
- Parco archeologico nazionale dei Massi di Cemmo

== Personalities from Cemmo ==
- Giovanni Pietro da Cemmo (15th-16th century), painter
