= Prestine =

- Comune
- Comune di Prestine
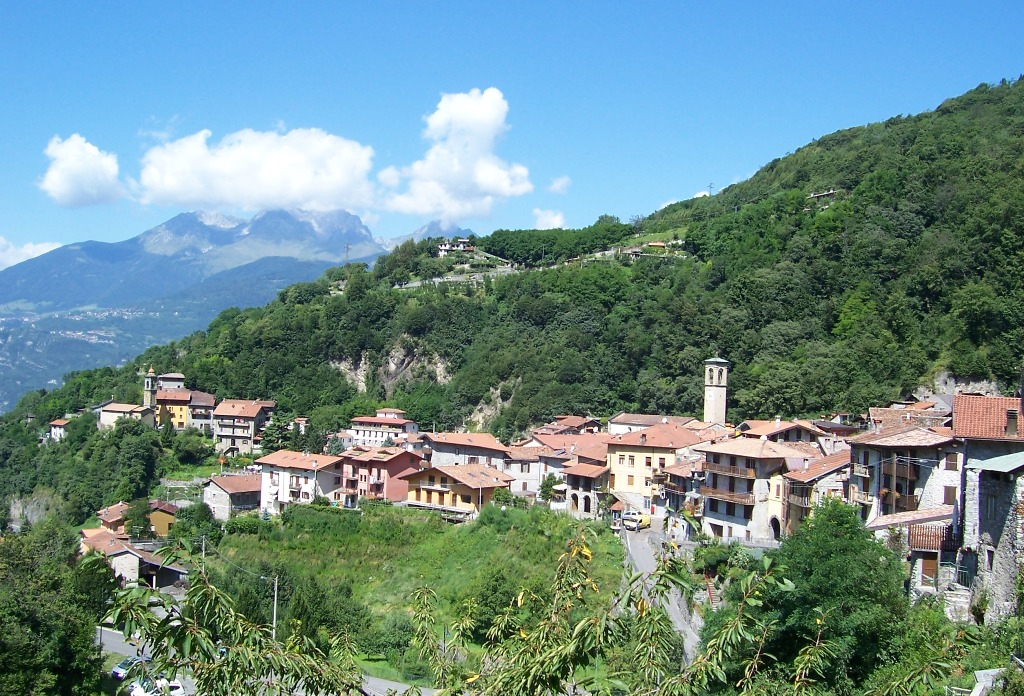
- Prestine

- Location within Italy Location within Lombardy
- Coordinates: 45°55′49″N 10°18′34″E
- Country: Italy
- Region: Lombardy
- Province: Brescia (BS)

Area
  - Total: 16 km^{2} (6.2 sq mi)
- Elevation: 610 m (2,000 ft)

Population (2011)
  - Total: 387
  - Density: 24/km^{2} (63/sq mi)
- Time zone: UTC+1 (CET)
  - Summer (DST): UTC+2 (CEST)
- Postal code: 25040
- Dialing code: 0364
- Patron saint: Sant'Apollonio
- Saint day: 7 luglio
- Website: Official website

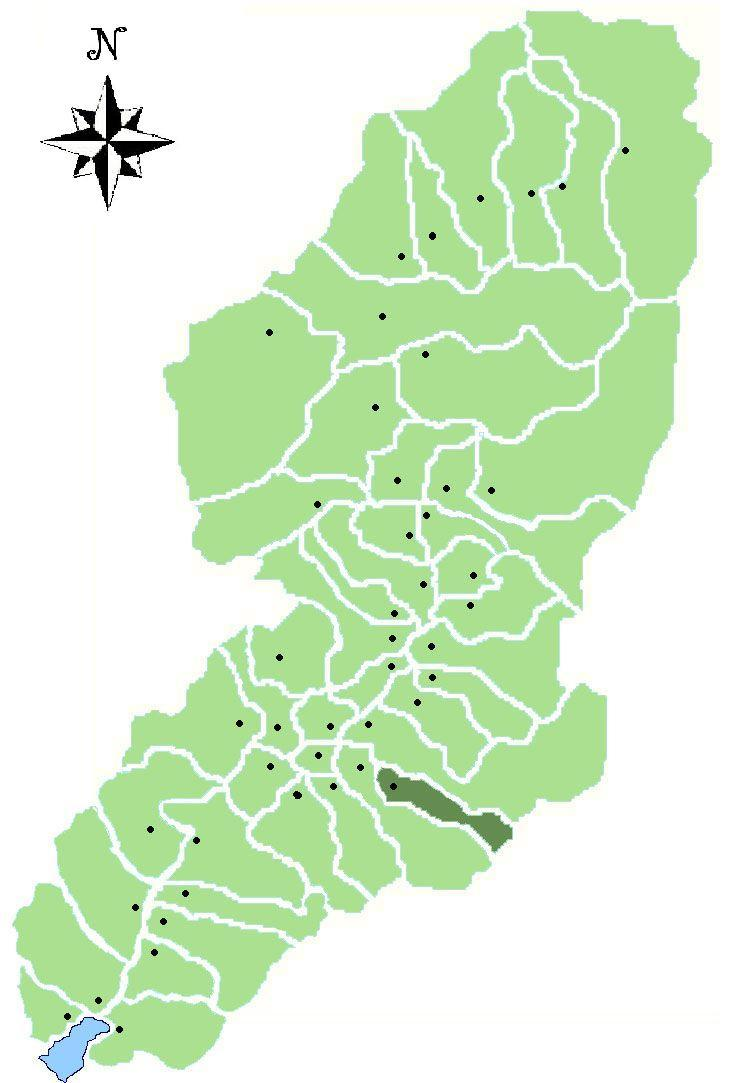
Location of Prestine in Val Camonica

Prestine (Prèhten in camunian dialect) is a former comune in the province of Brescia, in Lombardy. It is now a frazione of the municipality of Bienno. It is situated in the Val Camonica. Neighbouring communes are Bagolino, Bienno, Breno and Niardo.
