= Giovanni Pietro da Cemmo =

Italian painter

- Occupation: Painter
- Years active: 1474 - 1504

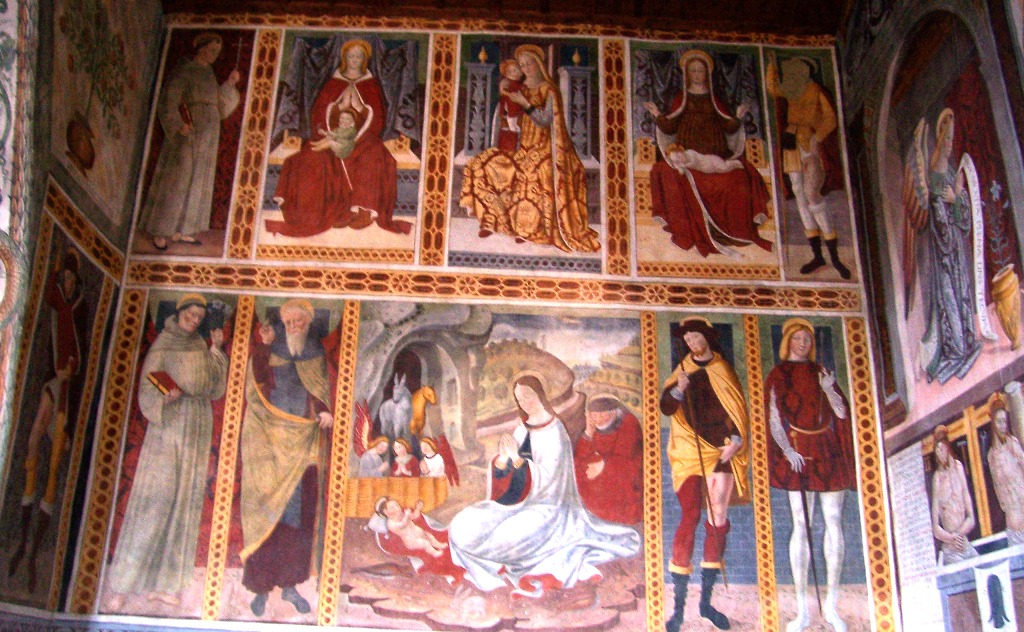
Composition of frescoes in the Church of Santa Maria Assunta in Esine attributed to Giovanni Pietro Da Cemmo

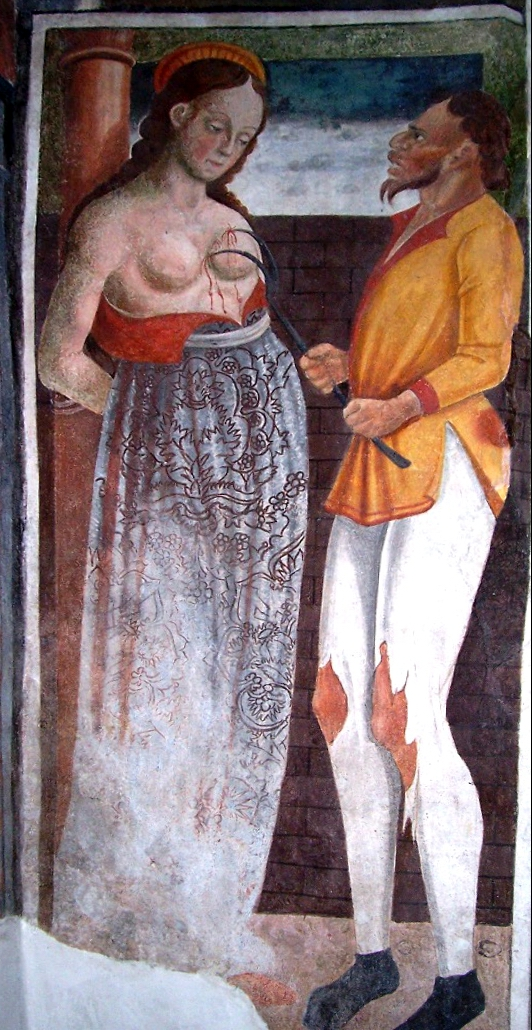
Martyr of St Agata, Church of Santa Maria Assunta, by Giovanni Pietro da Cemmo (1492 ca), Esine

Giovanni Pietro da Cemmo (15th century - 16th century) was an Italian painter.

Details on the artist's life are very scarce: perhaps born in Cemmo, he was active from 1474 to 1504 in a large area including Brescia and Cremona.

Giovanni Pietro was born into a family of artists. Among the members of his family were Master Ghirardo and Master Paroto, who in 1447 signed an altarpiece for the Pieve of San Siro in Cemmo.

His style, at least until 1486, is a footprint Lombard-Venetian Gothic style, while the last period between 1498 and 1504 he showed the influence of Vincenzo Foppa and Bramante.

== Bibliography ==
- Maria Luisa Ferrari, Giovan Pietro da Cemmo. Fatti di pittura bresciana del Quattrocento, Milano, Ceschina, 1956.
- Franco Mazzini, Santa Maria Assunta a Esine. I dipinti murali di Giovan Pietro da Cemmo. I restauri., Azzano San Paolo, Bolis edizioni, 2000.
