= Family Bettoni =

Venetian noble family

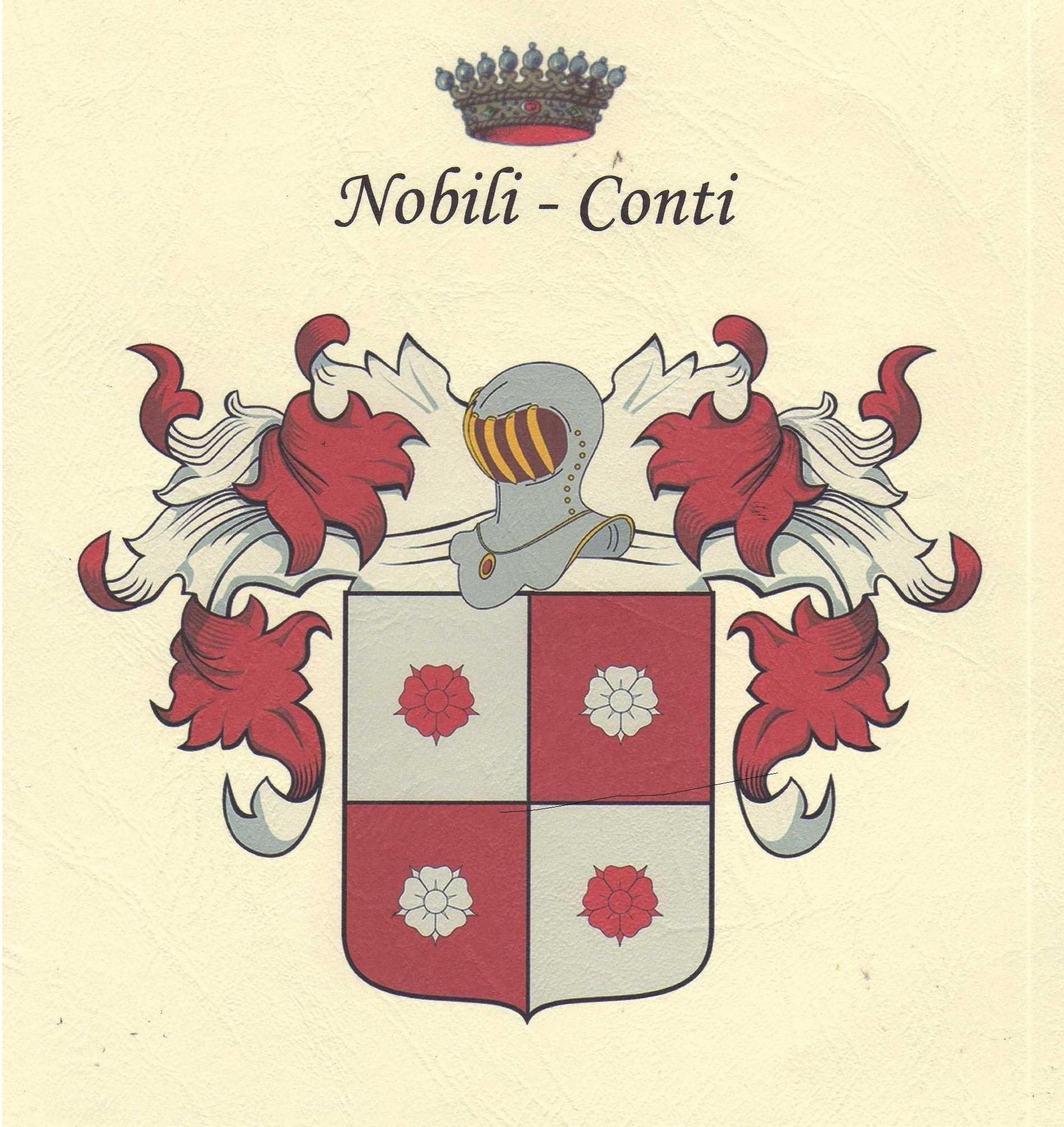
Arms of the Counts Bettoni. Quarterly, argent and gules (silver and red), four roses in the quarters countercharged.

The Bettoni family is noble family that would be made Counts Bettoni. They originated in Bienno, Italy, near the city of Brescia, in Val Camonica, Lombardy.

Lorenzo Bettoni ennobled merchant, 18 February 1684, was the first to give money to finance the war of the Republic of Venice against the Turks of the Ottoman Empire, and thus access to the Venetian nobility, offering 10 000 ducats.

His uncle Luigi Bettoni a Dominican friar, was a preacher renamed of the Piazza San Marco of Venice.

Nicolo Bettoni (born 24 April 1770), printer, editor and typographer and friend of Firmin Didot travels in Europe, where he is presented to the Emperor Ferdinand I of Austria and to the Tsar Nicholas I of Russia, then in Paris, where he meets the Vicomte François-René de Chateaubriand, in Geneva and London with his brother Giovanni Bettoni from 1832 to 1846.

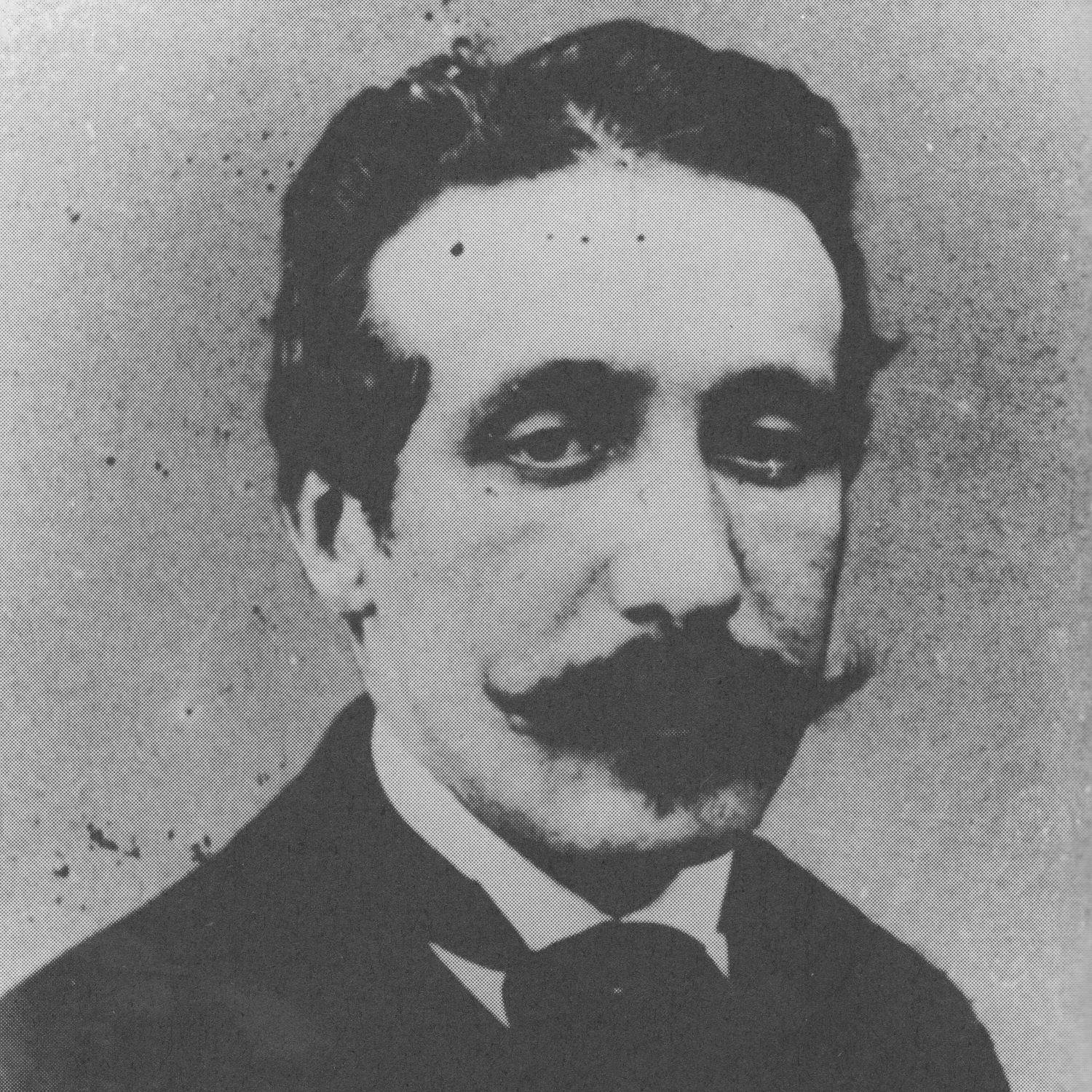
Francesco Bettoni Cazzago

Francesco Bettoni Cazzago (born 7 April 1835 in Brescia; died 12 May 1898), son of Giacomo and Maria Bettoni Cazzago, writer and professor at the University of Padua, brother of the future Senator Ludovico Bettoni has written extensively on Brescia.

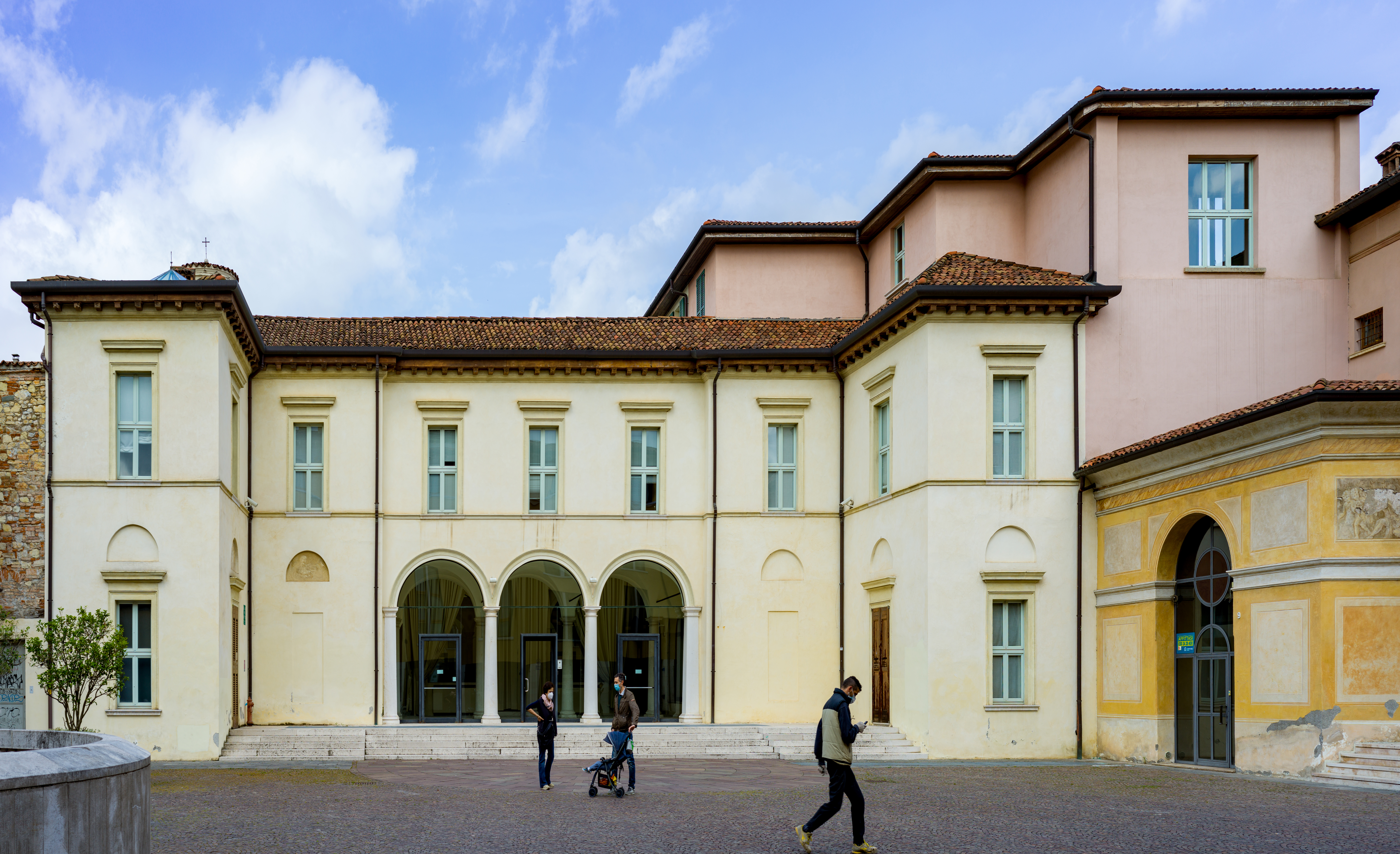
Bettoni Cazzago Palace, Bruno Boni, Place, Brescia

Count Federico Bettoni Cazzago (born in Brescia on 10 February 1865; died in Florence on 10 July 1923) was the president of the Civil Hospital of Brescia, President the Italian Red Cross, and member of the board of the Italian Commercial Bank (1920–1923), Grand Officer of the Order of Saints Maurice and Lazarus and Knight of the Sovereign Military Order of Malta.

His son, Count Alessandro Bettoni Cazaggo (born 7 November 1892 in Brescia; died 28 April 1951 in Rome), a great rider and military career, in part in Olympic Games of London in 1948.

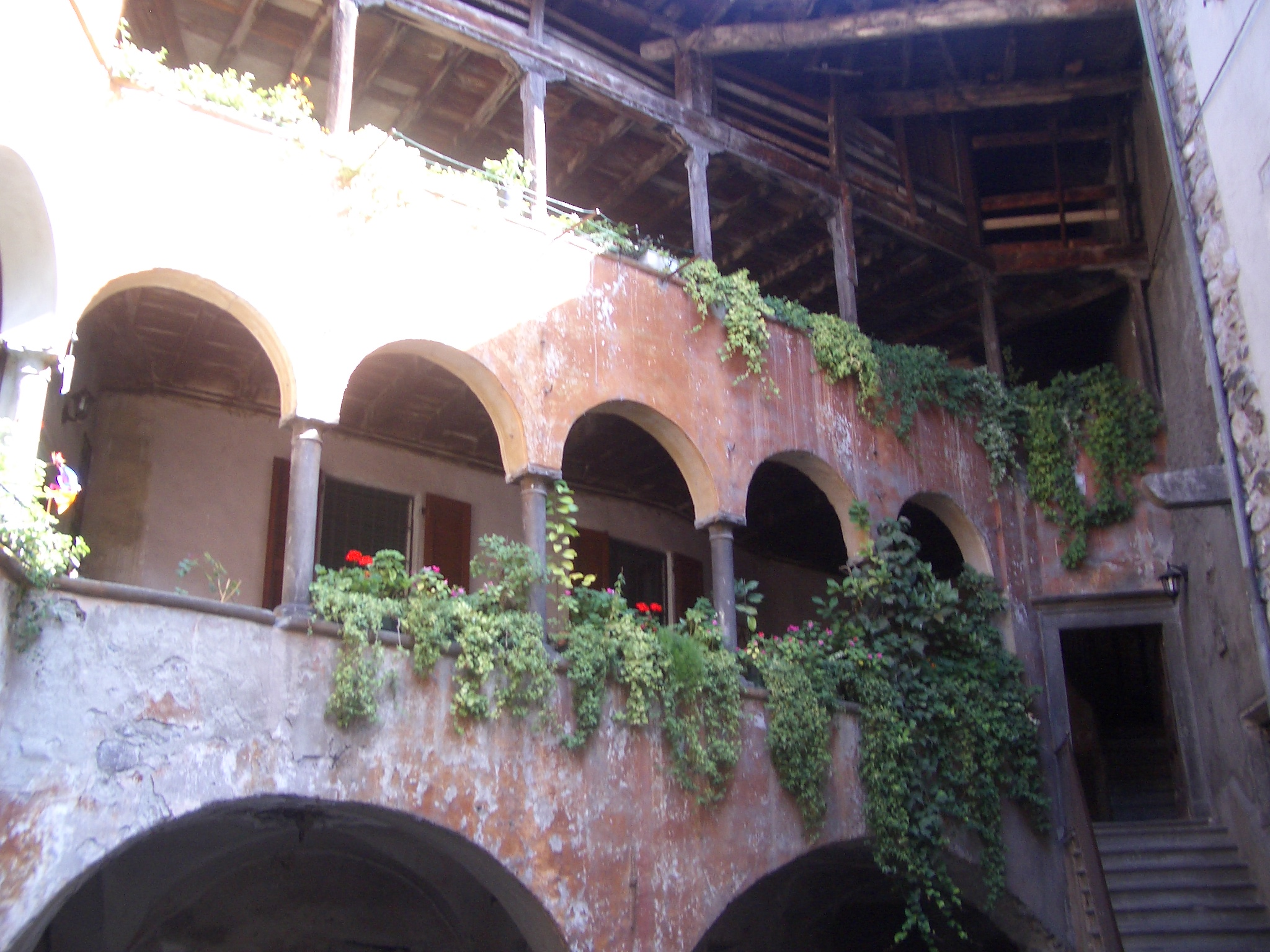
Casa Bettoni antico palazzo in Bienno

From another original related Brescian branch, Maria Bettoni of Bienno (and her husband Battista Panteghini) let their Simoni-Fè- Montholon Palace usufruct to the municipality of Bienno in 1988 that turned into a municipal library and a cultural center.

The family of the current Count Bettoni Cazzago still lives in the Villa Bettoni of Gargnano on the banks of Lake Garda and exports Franciacorta from Chardonnay and Pinot grapes, produced by their Azienda of Cazzago San Martino all around the world.
