= Bettoni =

Bettoni is an Italian surname. Notable people with the surname include:

- Count Lorenzo Bettoni ennobled in 1684 in Venice, Italy
- Count Francesco Bettoni Cazzago (1835–1898), writer and professor at the University of Padua, Italy.
- Count Federico Bettoni Cazzago (1865–1923), President of the Italian Red Cross
- Count Alessandro Bettoni Cazaggo (1892–1951), a rider and military career, in part in Olympic Games of London in 1948
- David Bettoni (born 1971), French former footballer and coach
- Dimitri Bettoni (born 1979), Belgian-Italian Captain of Industry
- Eduardo Bettoni (born 1990), Brazilian judoka
- Harrison Bettoni (born 2007), English footballer
- Patrick Bettoni (born 1975), Swiss–Italian footballer
- Samuele Bettoni (born 1989), Italian footballer
- Vincenzo Bettoni (1881–1954), Italian opera singer

== See also ==
- Villa Bettoni, Gargnano
