= Pieve of Saint Syrus (Cemmo) =

Church in Cemmo, Italy

Pieve di San Siro Pieve of Saint Syrus
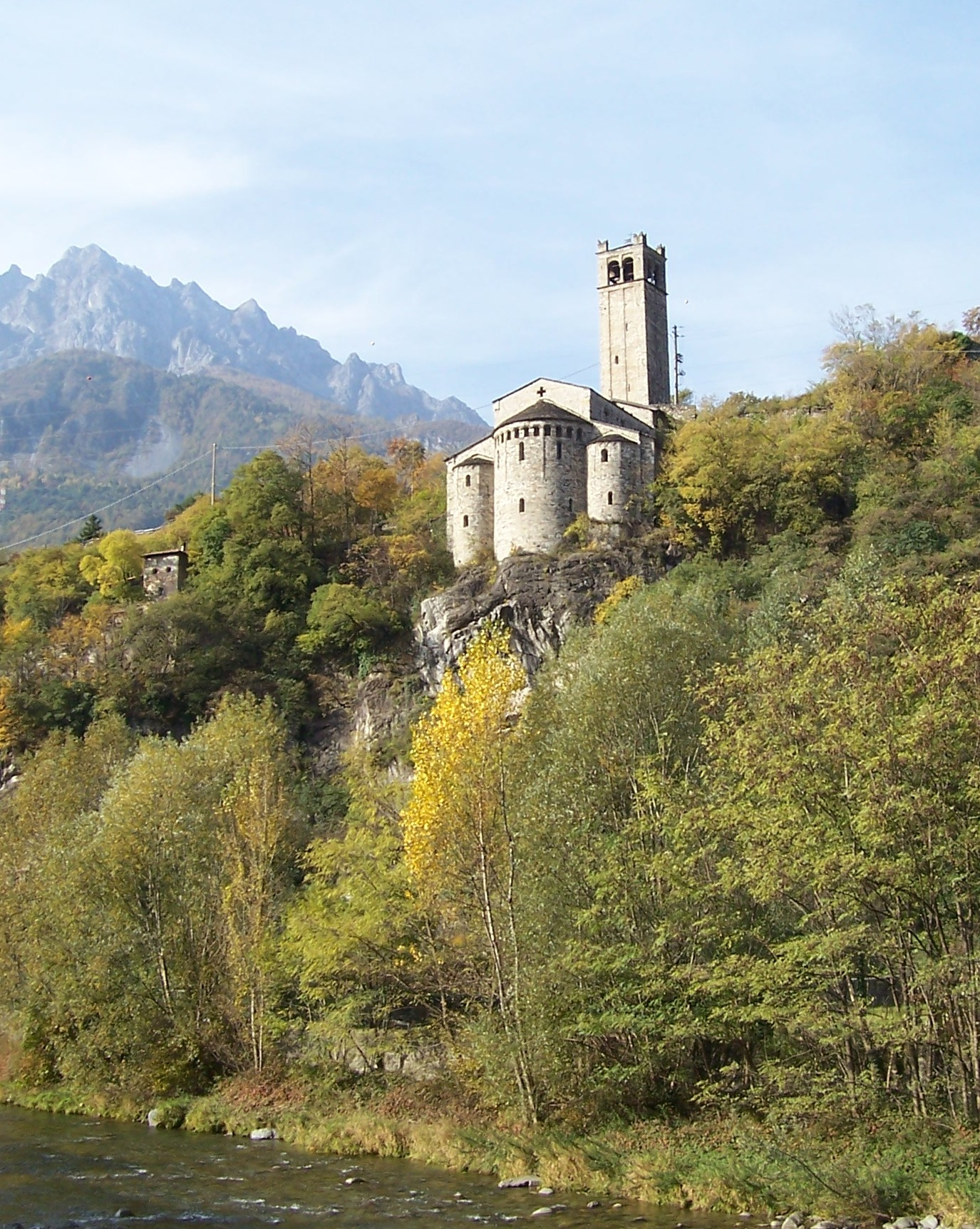

Religion
- Affiliation: Catholic church
- Province: Brescia

Location
- Municipality: Capo di Ponte
- State: Italy
- Interactive map of Pieve di San Siro; Pieve of Saint Syrus
- Coordinates: 46°01′53″N 10°20′28″E

Architecture
- Direction of façade: west (closed by tower-bell)

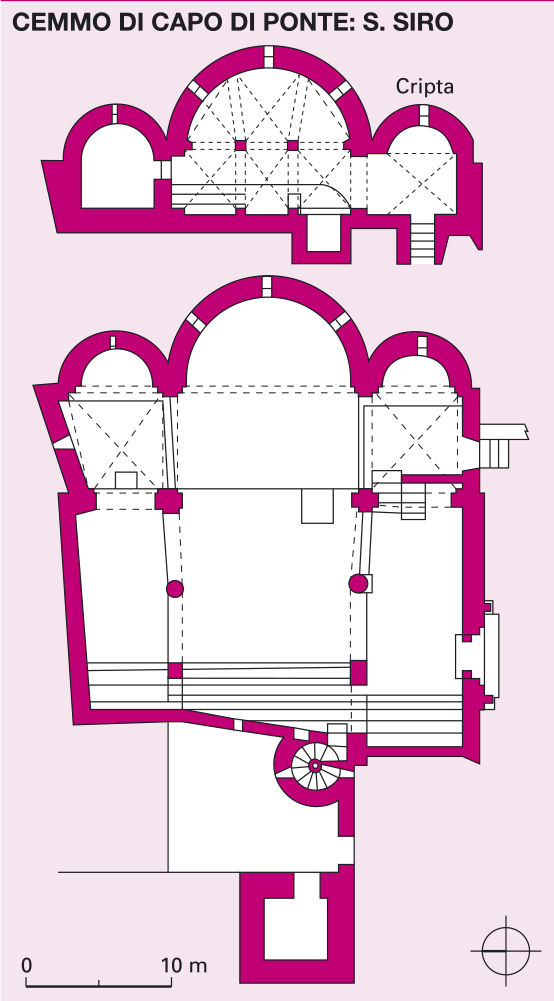
Plan of church

The Pieve of Saint Syrus (Italian: Pieve di San Siro) is a church in the village of Cemmo, a frazione of Capo di Ponte (Lombardy, northern Italy), at 410 meters above sea level. It was one of the pievi, or isolated churches with baptistries, among which the territory of Val Camonica was divided. The complex, which stands on a ridge overlooking the river Oglio, can be reached via a staircase built in the 1930s.

The foundation of the church in its present form probably dates to the end of the 11th century, although a fragment of a Roman inscription on a lancet window suggests that a Roman building was previously located on the site, and later converted into a house of Christian worship between the eighth and ninth centuries. In the crypt elements are present in pre-Romanesque capitals and columns. The bell-tower appears to be an addition of the fifteenth century. Following the visit to Val Camonica of St. Charles Borromeo in 1580 some parts of the church were rebuilt, including the ceiling of the nave.

Major works of restoration began in 1912 under the auspices of the state. Fragments of stone which had fallen from the portal were returned to place, the whole north wall of the choir was rebuilt and both the cross-vaulting of the aisles and the coffering of the nave were done away with. The walls of the crypt and its access stair were also rebuilt. In a later restoration the pavements of the nave and crypt were raised and remade using slabs of local stone. In the early 1990s structural works were undertaken to secure the building and its campanile.

The structure has an east–west orientation, with three apses, and a very elaborate entrance on the south side, carved with symbols and fantastic flowers. Inside, the sanctuary is elevated from the central nave and the two side aisles. Even in the crypt the subdivision in three apses is maintained.

On the back wall to the west there are a number of steps that had to serve, according to tradition, catechumens. From these leads to a door that went into the sacristy and the bell tower.

From this church comes the altarpiece of the Master Paroto stored at New York City, signed and dated 1447 (or 1444).

The large baptismal font inside the church is probably formed from the basin of a Roman or early medieval wine press.
