= Esine =

Esine Éden
- Comune
- Comune di Esine
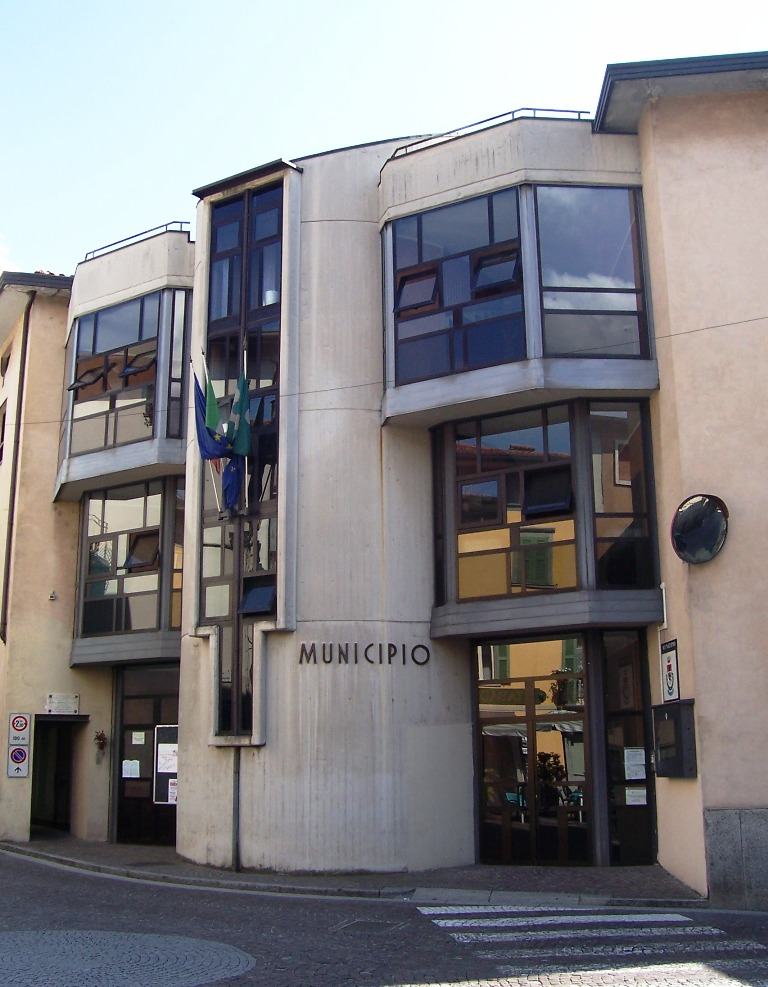
- Town hall

- Location within Italy Location within Lombardy
- Coordinates: 45°55′35″N 10°15′6″E
- Country: Italy
- Region: Lombardy
- Province: Brescia (BS)
- Frazioni: Plemo, Sacca

Area
  - Total: 30 km^{2} (12 sq mi)
- Elevation: 286 m (938 ft)

Population (2011)
  - Total: 5,389
  - Density: 180/km^{2} (470/sq mi)
- Time zone: UTC+1 (CET)
  - Summer (DST): UTC+2 (CEST)
- Postal code: 25040
- Dialing code: 0364
- Patron saint: Conversione di San Paolo
- Saint day: 25 gennaio
- Website: Official website

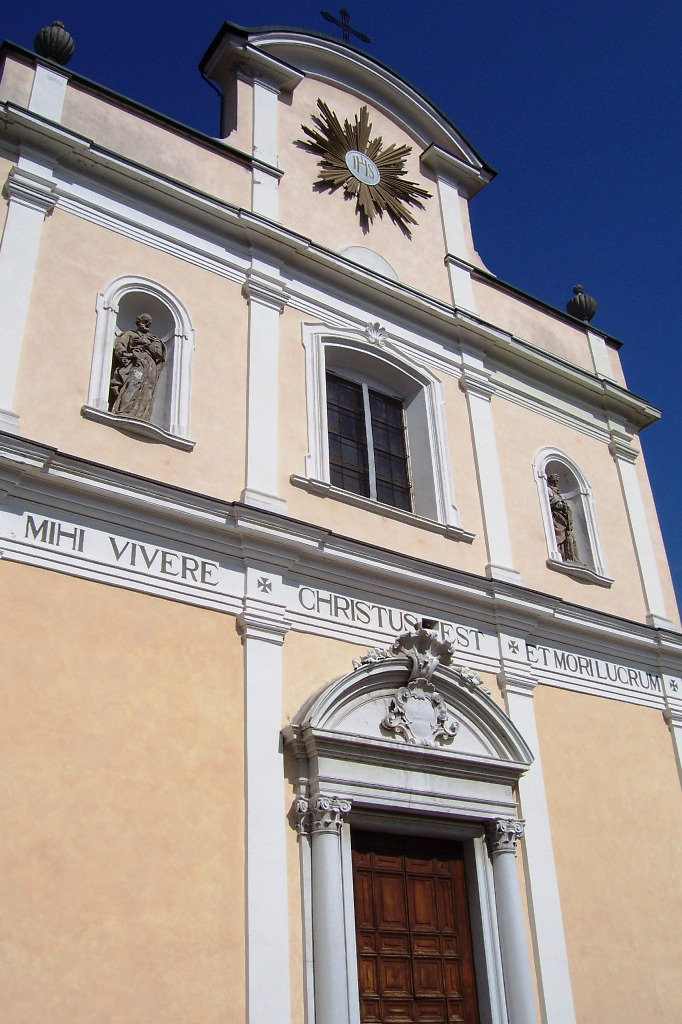
Parish church

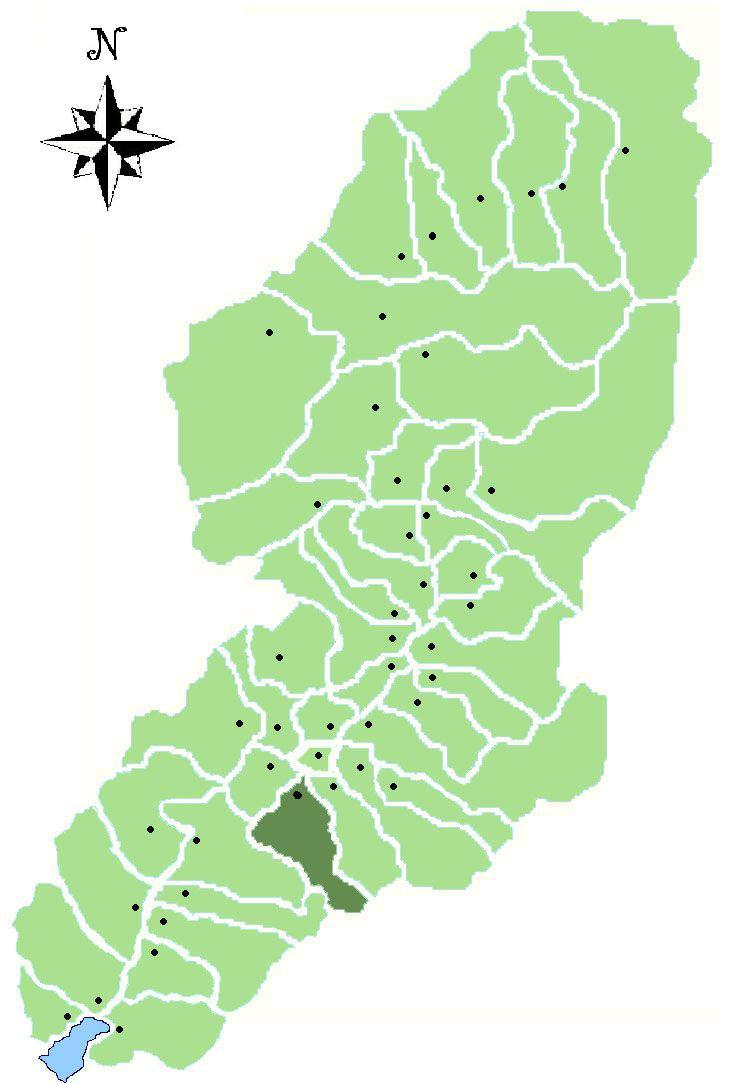
Location of Esine in Val Camonica

Esine (Camunian: Éden) is a comune in the province of Brescia, in the Italian region Lombardy, in the Camonica valley, located 43 kilometres (27 miles) north of Brescia.

It is bounded by other communes of Berzo Inferiore, Bovegno, Cividate Camuno, Darfo Boario Terme, Gianico, Piancogno.

== Twin Towns - Sister Cities ==
Esine is twinned with:

- Civitanova Marche in Italy (since 1989)
