= Museo nazionale della Valcamonica =

National Museum of Valcamonica
- Museo nazionale della Valcamonica
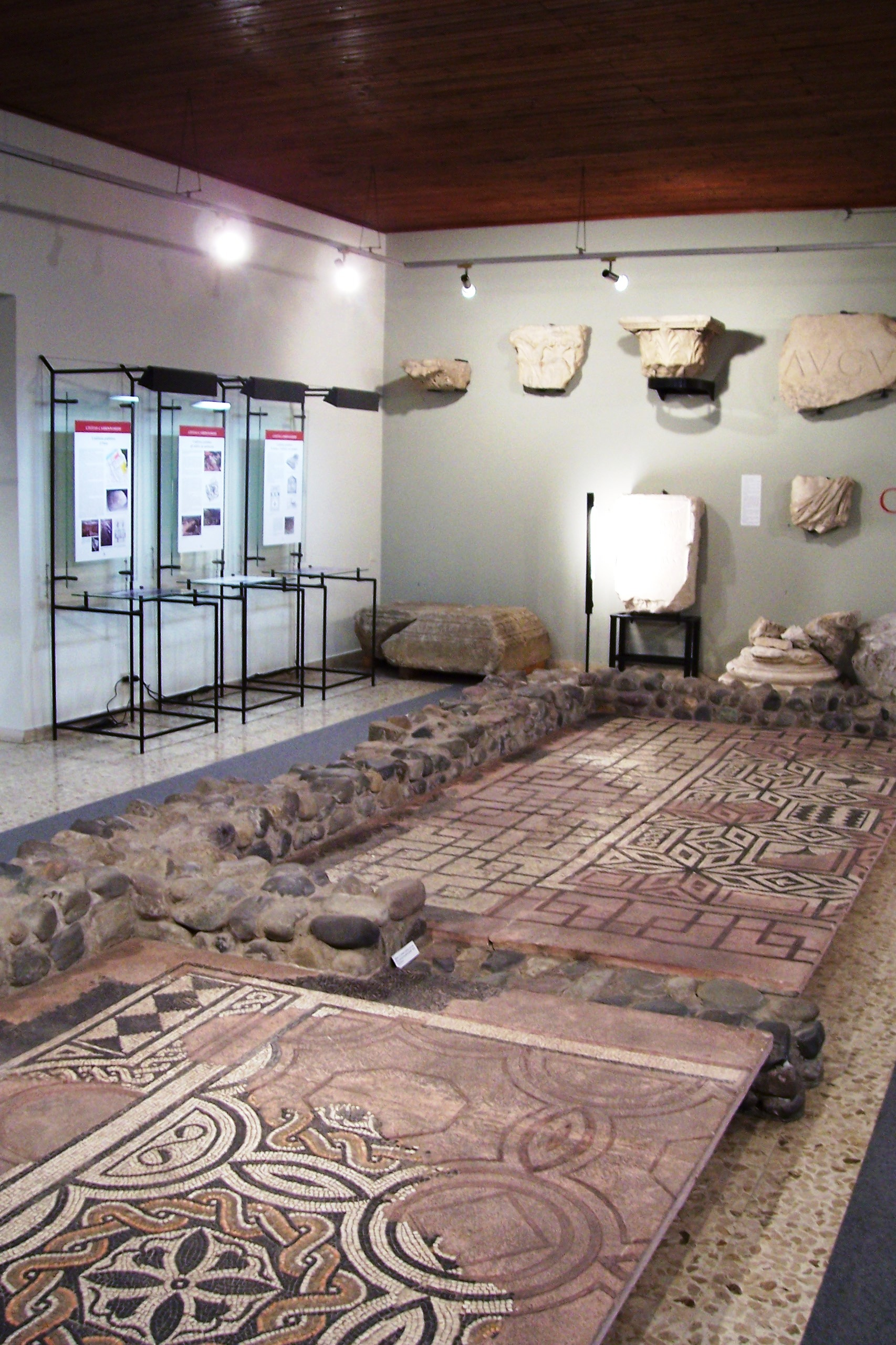
- Museum interior
- Location: Via Roma 29, Cividate Camuno, Italy
- Coordinates: 45°56′35″N 10°16′10″E
- Type: Archaeological museum
- Website: Official website

The Museo nazionale della Valcamonica is an archaeological museum located in the town of Cividate Camuno (Province of Brescia), which has a collection of Roman-period finds from various excavations which took place mostly in the 17th century in Val Camonica.

== Organization of the Collection ==
The museum is divided into four sections:

- Territory - with finds from the Roman conquest in 16 BC
- City - with a reconstruction of ancient Civitas Camunnorum
- Religion - including a statue of Minerva, one of three copies in existence and perhaps the best one, of the Athena Hygieia of Athens (original of the 5th century BC)
- Necropolis - with finds recovered from various sites in Val Camonica

The objects on display mostly come from Cividate Camuno, but there are also items from the Sanctuary of Minerva in Breno.

== Photo gallery ==
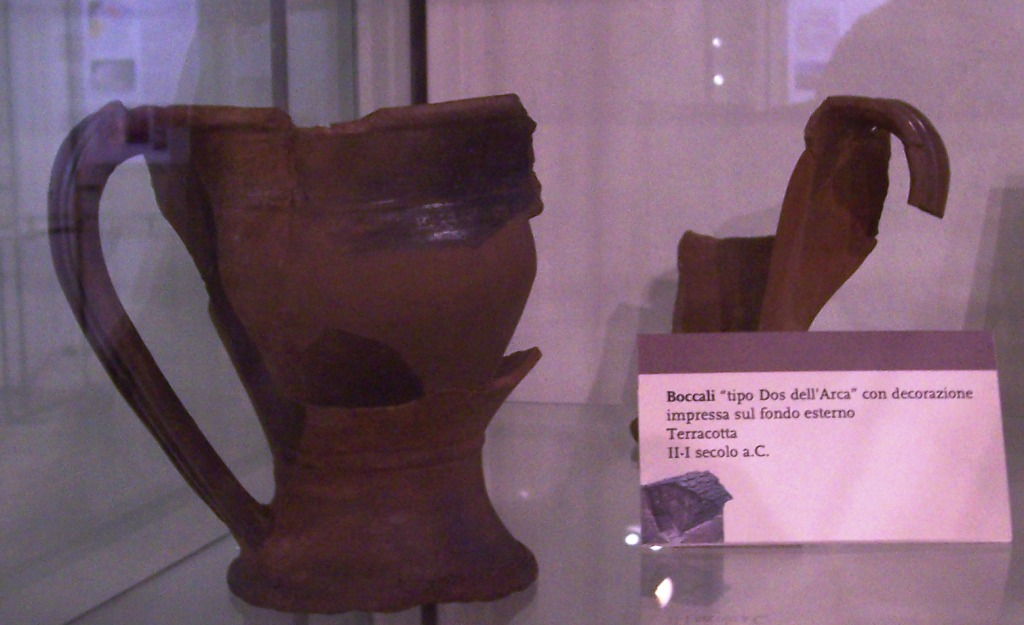
Tankard of the type "Dos dell'Arca"

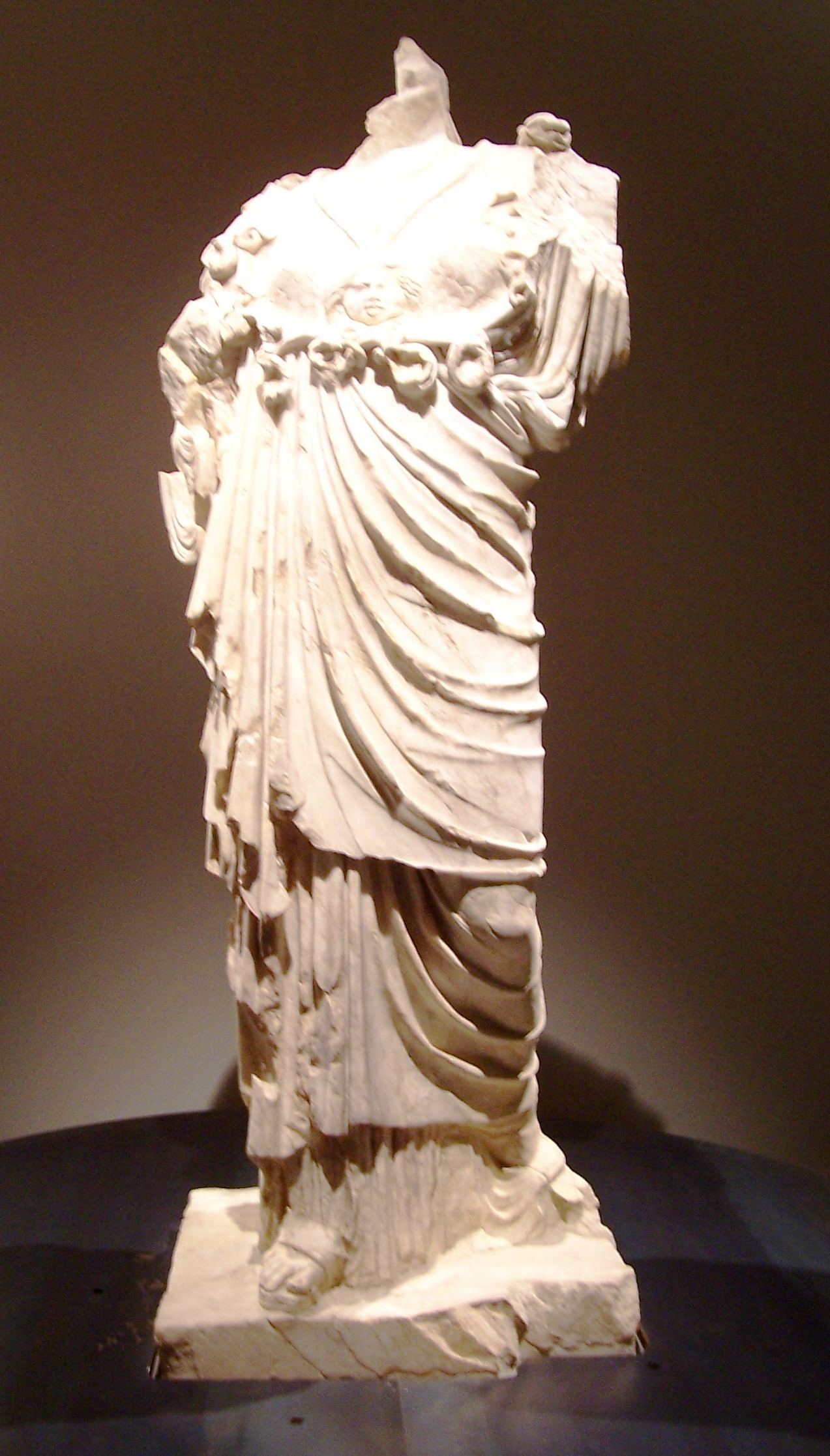
Statue of Minerva Hygeia

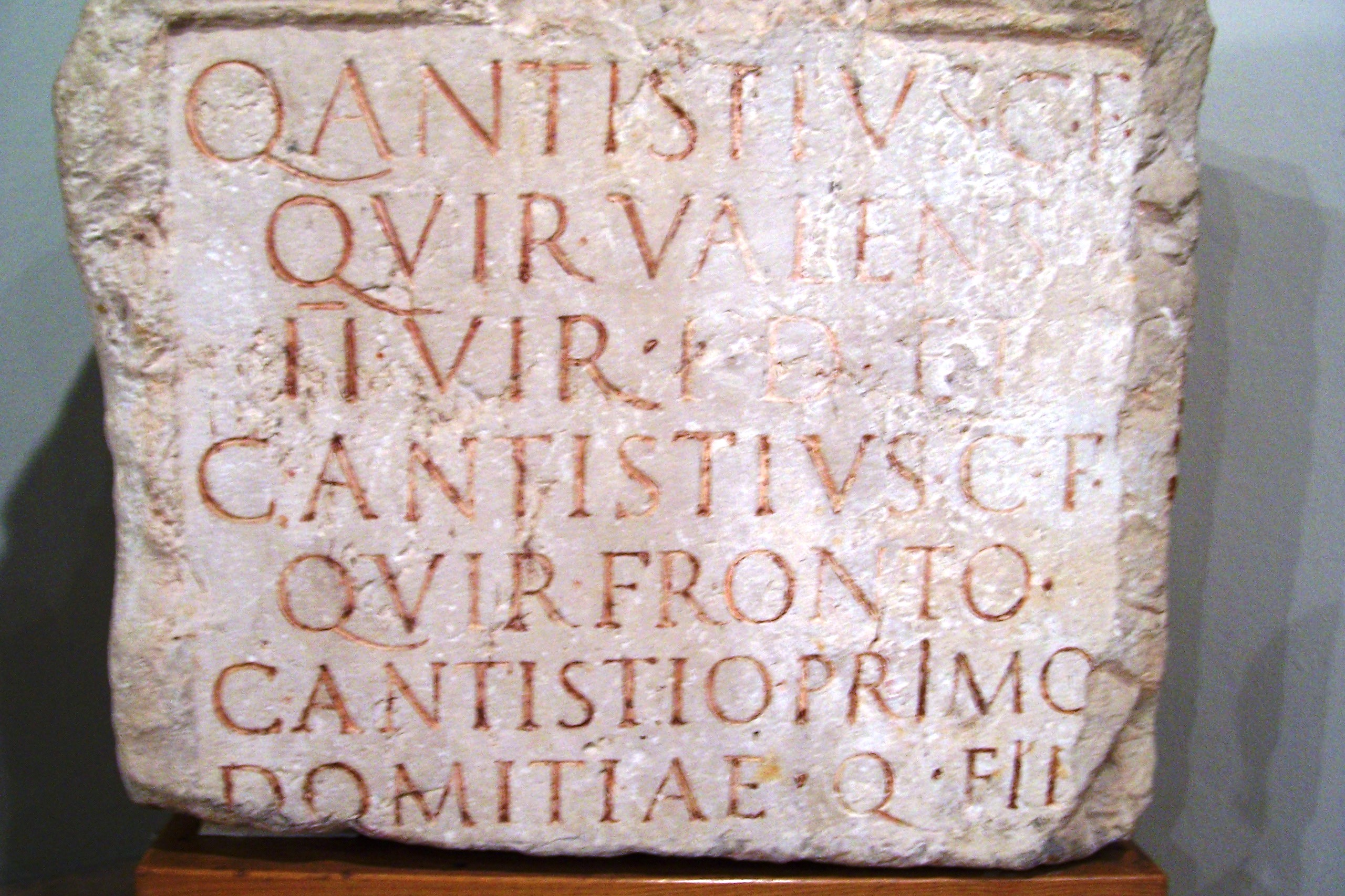
Inscription referring to the Roman tribe of Quirina in Valle Camonica (QVIR)

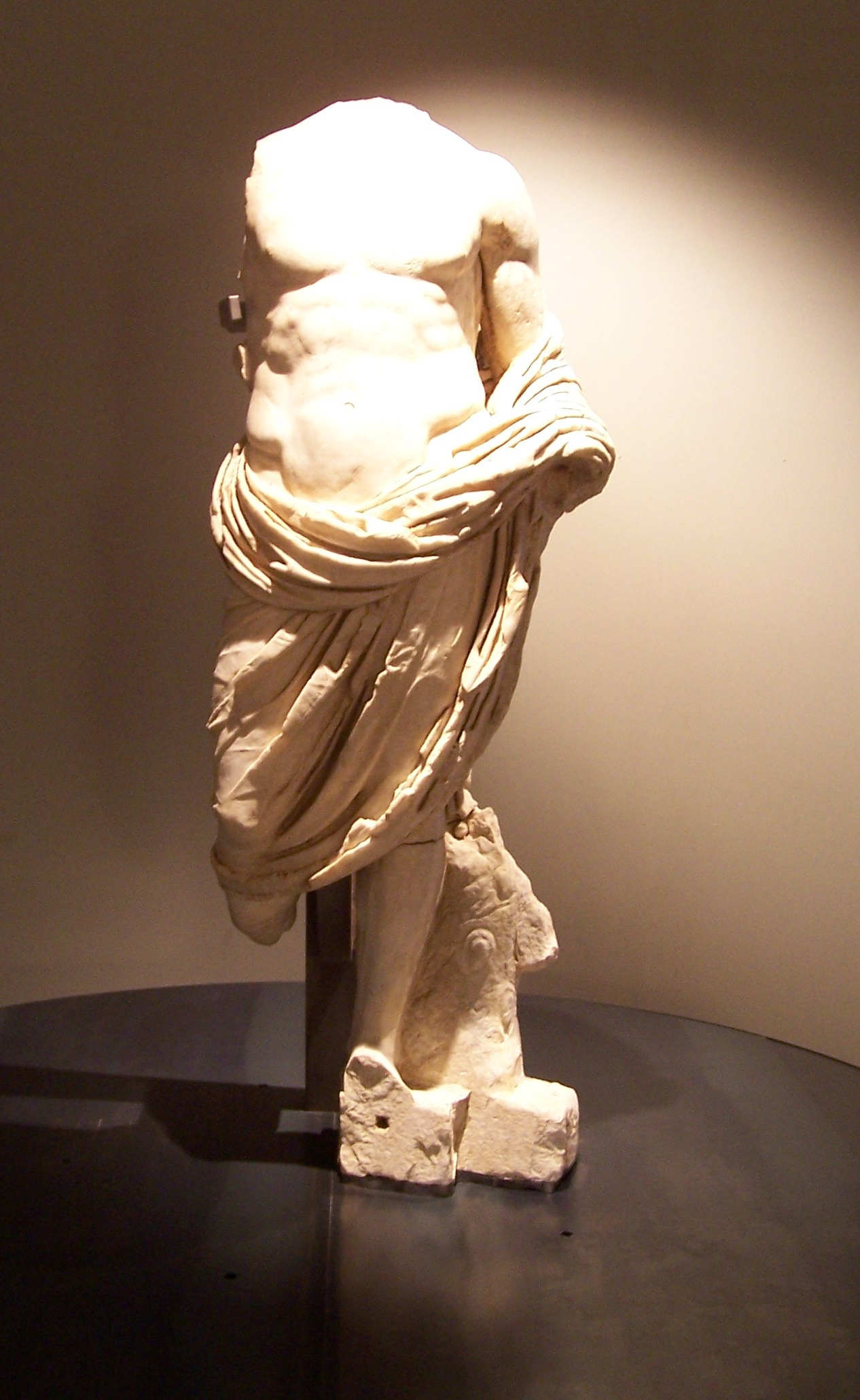
Headless statue of an emperor

== See also ==
- Sanctuary of Minerva
- Val Camonica
