= Breno, Lombardy =

Breno Bré
- Comune
- Comune di Breno
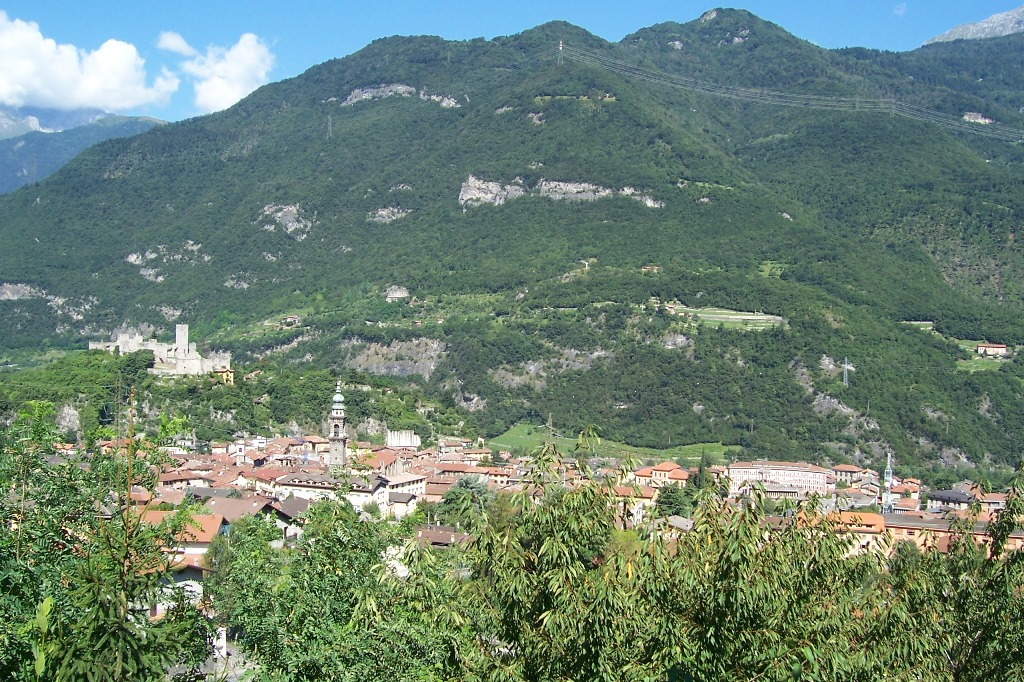
- View of Breno

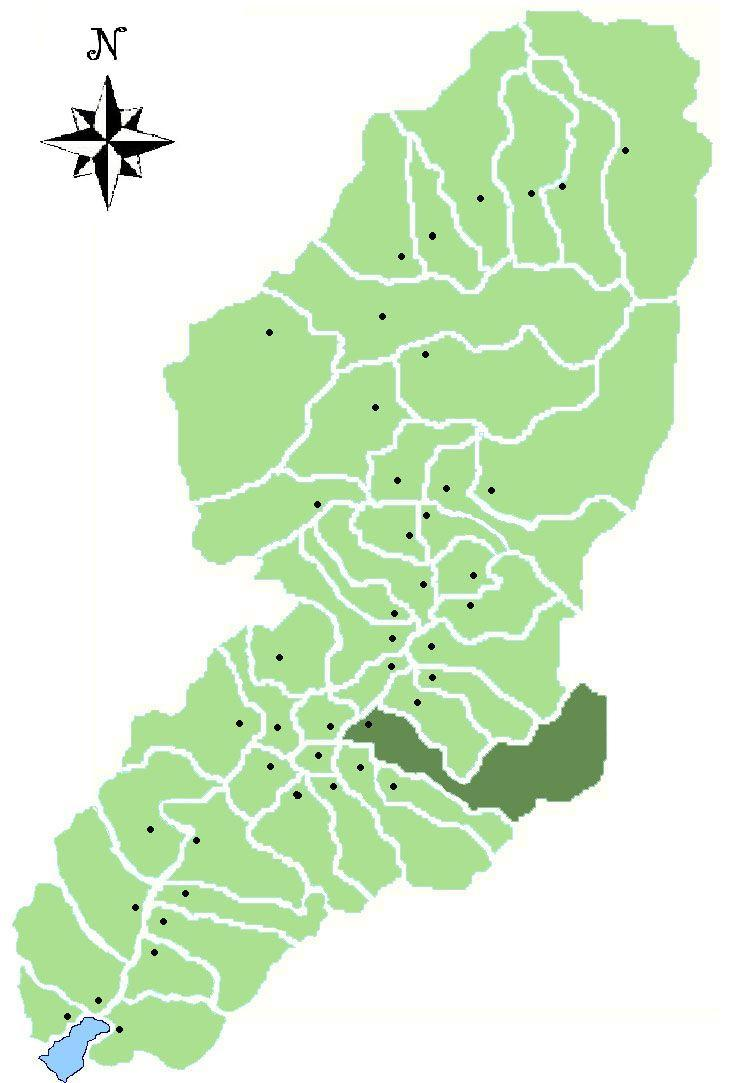

- Location within Italy Location within Lombardy
- Coordinates: 45°57′31″N 10°18′20″E
- Country: Italy
- Region: Lombardy
- Province: Brescia (BS)
- Frazioni: Astrio, Campogrande, Degna, Gaver, Mezzarro, Montepiano, Pescarzo, Ponte della Madonna

Government
  - Mayor: Sandro Farisoglio (center-left)

Area
  - Total: 58 km^{2} (22 sq mi)
- Elevation: 343 m (1,125 ft)

Population (2011)
  - Total: 4,986
  - Density: 86/km^{2} (220/sq mi)
- Demonym: Brenesi
- Time zone: UTC+1 (CET)
  - Summer (DST): UTC+2 (CEST)
- Postal code: 25043
- Dialing code: 0364
- Patron saint: Saint Valentine
- Saint day: February the 14th
- Website: Official website, Official website

Breno [ˈbreːno] (Camunian: Bré; obsolete German: Brenn) is an Italian comune of 4,986 inhabitants in Val Camonica, province of Brescia, in Lombardy.

== Geography ==
It is bounded by other communes of Niardo, Bagolino, Bienno, Braone, Ceto, Cividate Camuno, Condino (TN), Daone (TN), Losine, Malegno, Niardo, Prestine.

The town of Breno stands in a north-south gorge, between the castle hill and the Corno Cerreto, on the left bank of the river Oglio. According to professor Fedele the gorge was once the bed of the Oglio.

== History ==
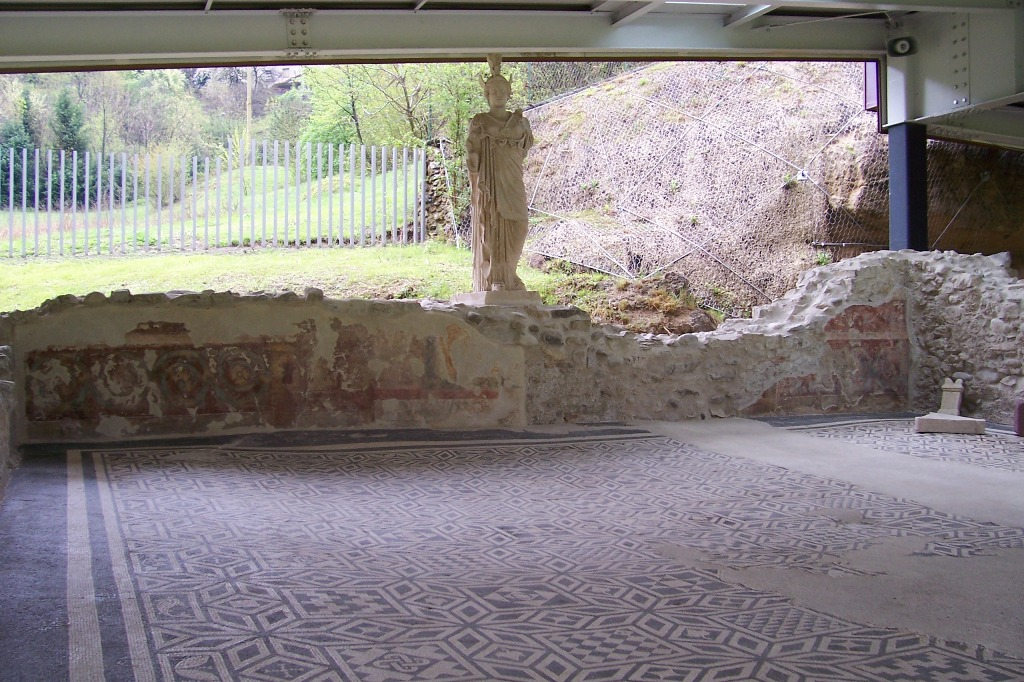
Sanctuary of Minerva

On top of the castle hill a house dating back to the Neolithic was discovered. In the locality Spinera, at the river Oglio, there is the Sanctuary of Minerva of the first century CE, which was ruined in the fifth century.

In the Middle Ages the Castle of Breno had two towers, one belonging to the Guelph family Ronchi, the other to the Ghibelline family Alberzoni. In the 1397 peace of Breno between Guelphs and Ghibellines, the representatives of the community of Breno sided both with the Ghibellines and the Guelphs.

During the Republic of Venice rule Breno was the seat of the Community of Val Camonica. Breno today is the seat of the Comunità montana di Valle Camonica.

The emblem of the province of Brescia is the group of five blazons: that of Brescia in the center, the town of Chiari, Breno, Verolanuova and Salò.

== Monuments and places of interest ==
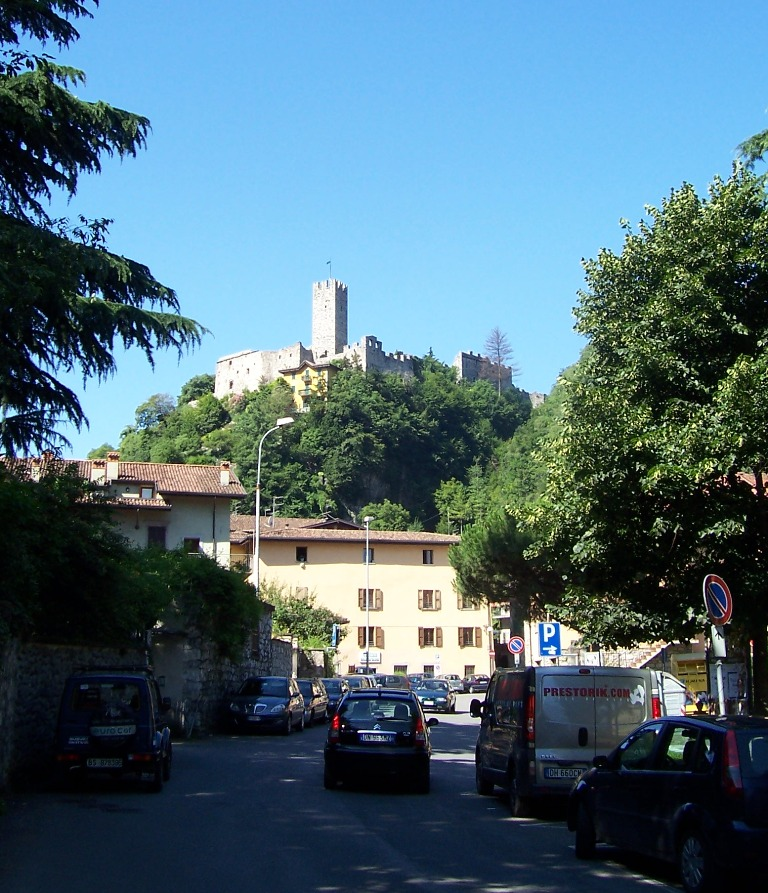
Castle of Breno

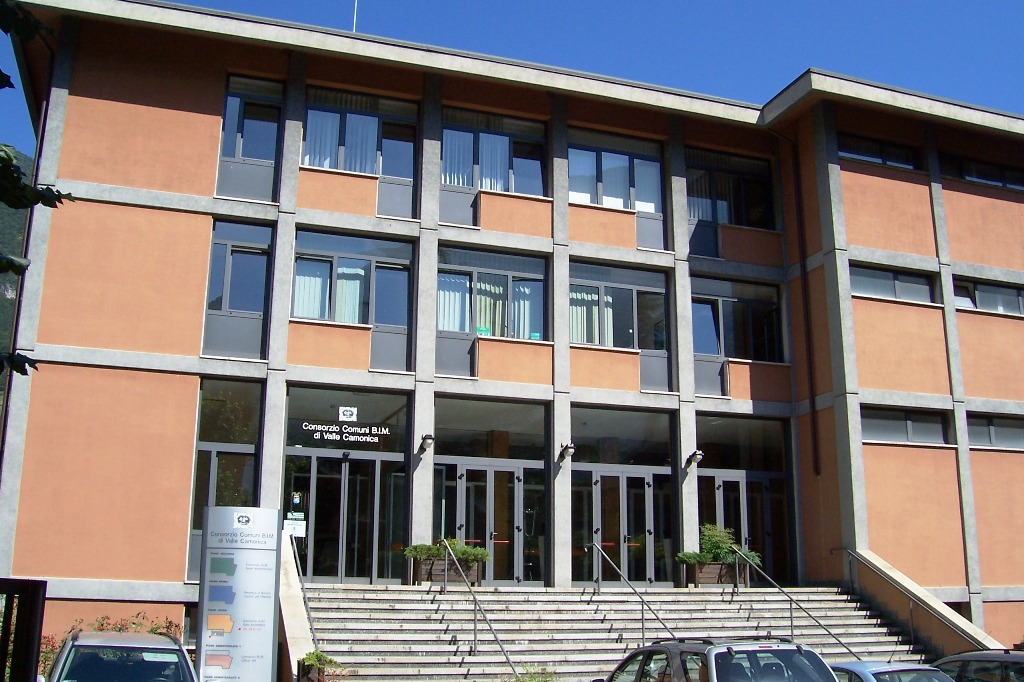
BIM of Valle Camonica

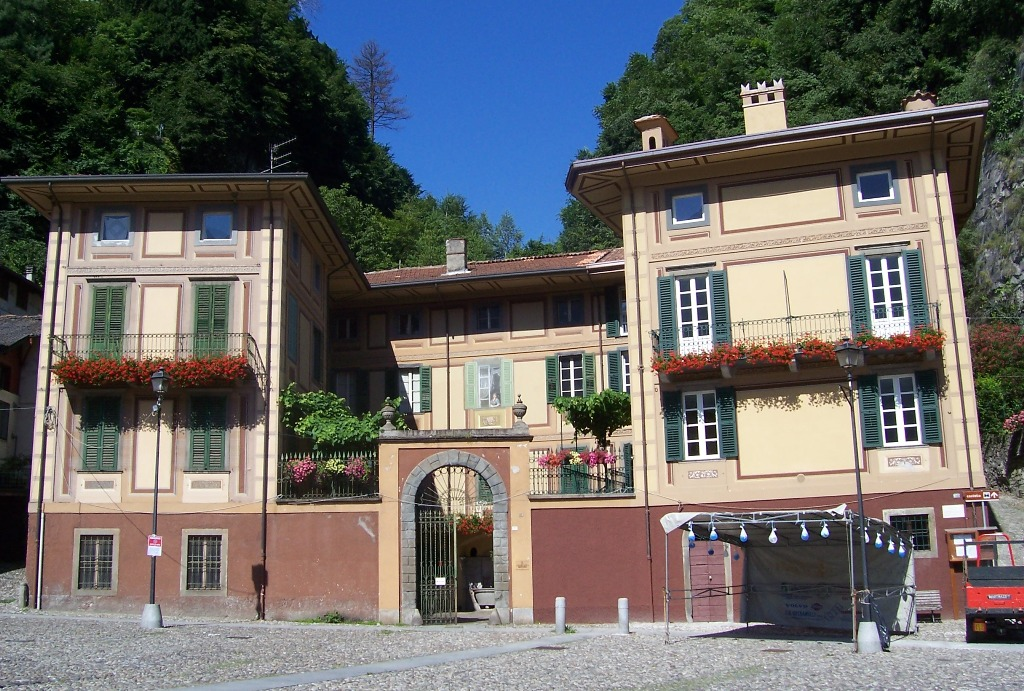
Villa Ronchi

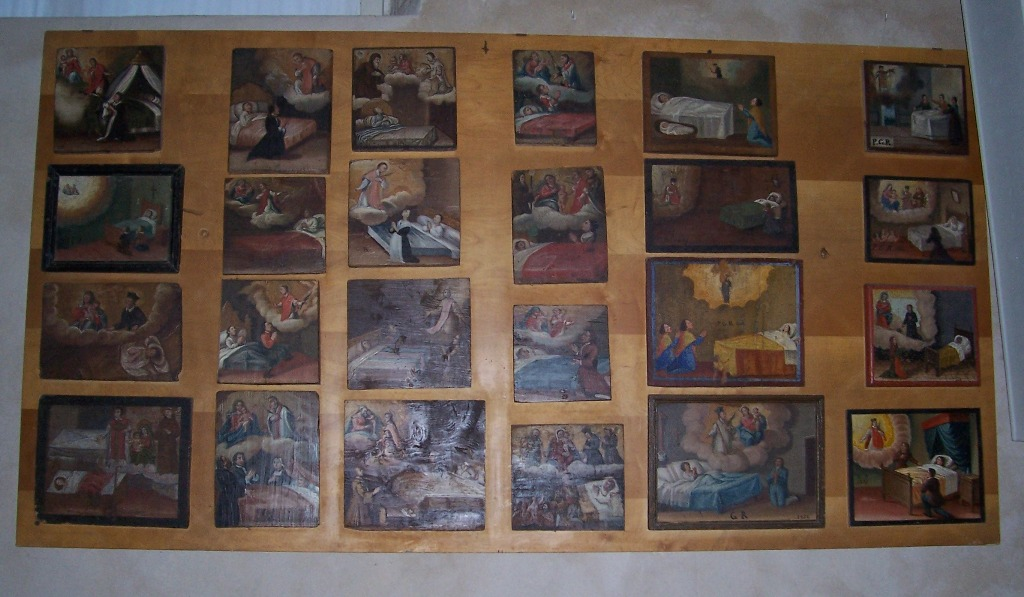
Ex voto in San Velentino

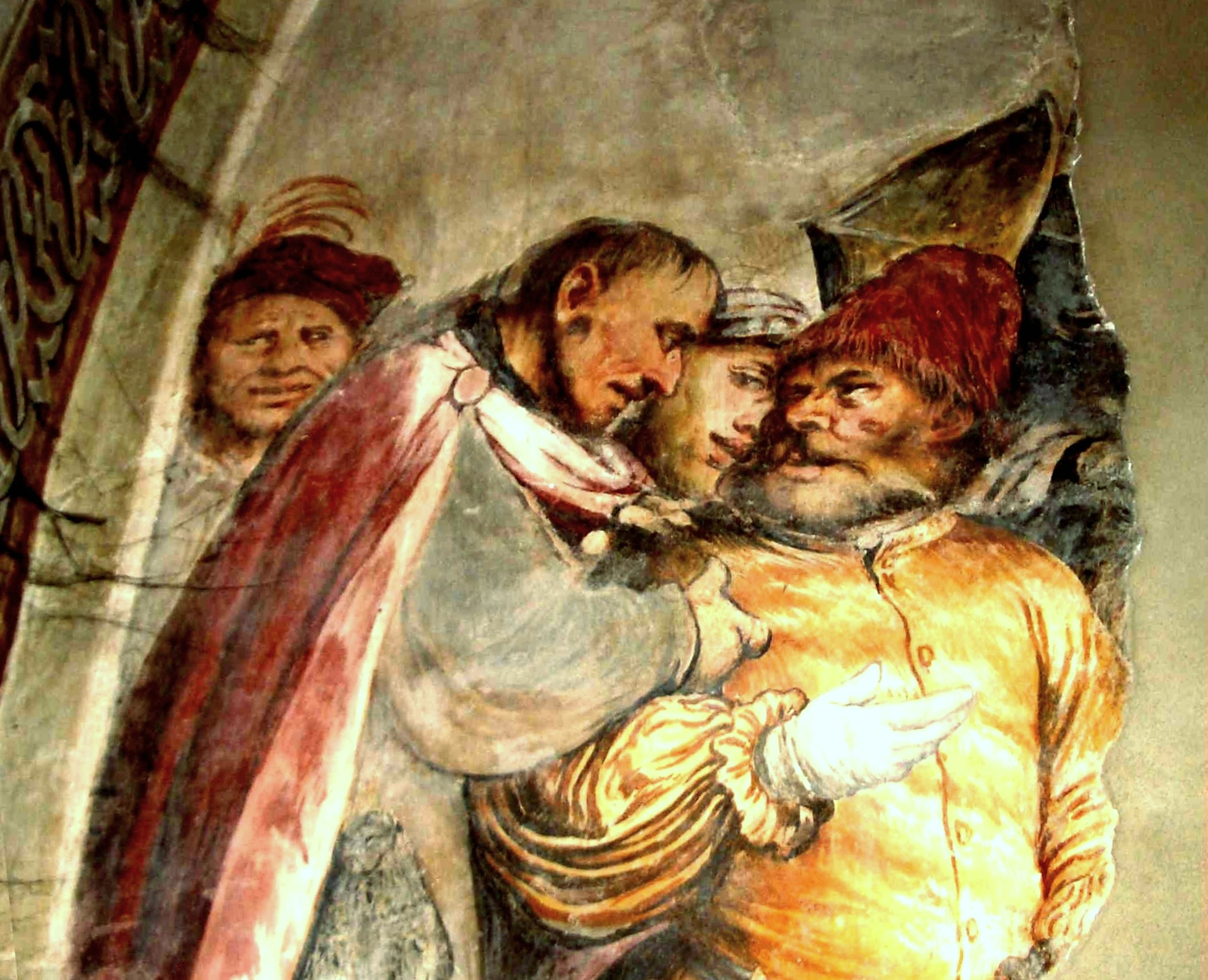
Frescoes of Romanino in the Church of Sant'Antonio Abate

=== Religious architecture ===
- Church of the Transfiguration of Our Lord Jesus Christ, the 17th century structure in the centre of the town, with frescoes by Antonio Guadagnini. The altars are in marble of Ono San Pietro.
- Church of Sant'Antonio Abate, preserves notable works of art, particularly the cycle of frescoes created by Romanino.
- Church of St Maria at the Bridge (or Minerva), from the 14th century. Leaning against the structure is a small temple of Minerva.
- Church of San Carlo, from the 17th century, with significant number of ex-votos.
- Church of San Maurizio, an ancient parish.
- Chapel of St. Apollonia, along the road leading to San Valentino.
- Church of San Valentino, 15th-century construction, interior perhaps Giovanni Pietro da Cemmo.

=== Military architectures ===
The Castle of Breno rises over a hill inhabited already in prehistoric times. It was the main bastion for the control of Valle Camonica until the seventeenth century.

== Transportation and infrastructure ==
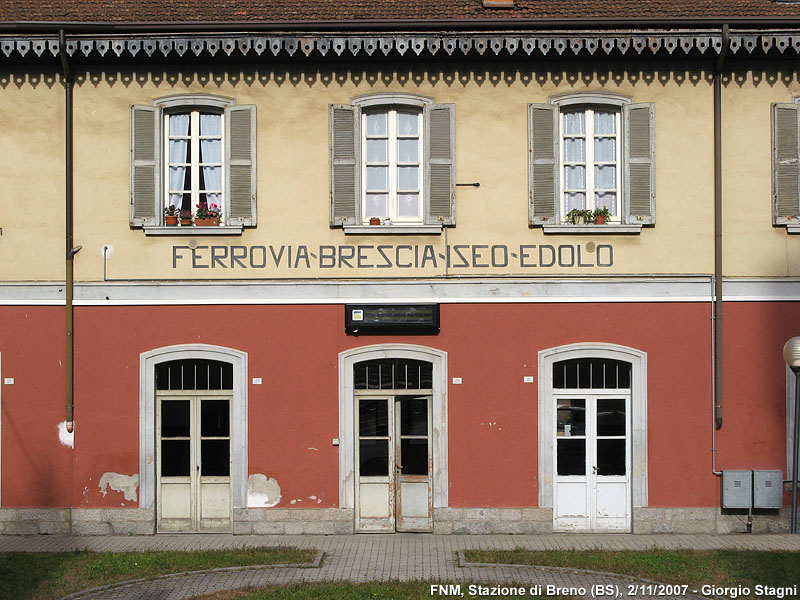
Facade of Breno railway station.

Breno is served by Breno railway station, located on the Brescia–Iseo–Edolo railway. Situated in the northern part of the town, the station is served by frequent regional train services to and from Iseo, Brescia and Edolo.

== Culture ==
=== Traditions and folklore ===
The scütüm are in camunian dialect nicknames, sometimes personal, elsewhere showing the characteristic features of a community. The one which characterize the people of Breno is Maia càrte or Pèla pàsser

=== Museums ===
- Sanctuary of Minerva

=== CaMus ===
The Museo Archeologico della Valle Camonica is located in Breno, also known as the Museo Camuna, and contains artifacts and artworks documenting the history of the region. Among the painting collection, are works by:

- Emilian 14th century master - I sette dormienti nella spelonca
- Venetian 16th century - Madonna with Bambino, Sts. Sebastian & Rocco
- Callisto Piazza da Lodi - Deposition
- Girolamo Romani detto Il Romanino - Crucifixion
- Anonymous 16/17th century - Triumph of death
- School of Bellini - Holy family & St. John
- Northern master - Capture of Christ
- Camillo Procaccini attributed (Bologna 1551-Milan 1629) - Martyrdom of St. Bartholemew
- School of Procaccini - Allegory of Flora crowned by genius
- Venetian 17th century - Adoration by Magi
- School of Ribera - St. Bartholomew
- School of Caravaggio - Incredulity of Thomas
- Giacomo Ceruti (Milan 1698-1767) - portrait of Cattaneo family member
- Felice Riccio detto Il Brusasorci (Verona 1540-1605)
- Francesco Giugno
- Francesco Monti (il Brescianino)
- Giulio Carponi
- Gaspare e Antonio Diziani
- Bice Del Balzo nel castello di Rosate
- Francesco Hayez
- Faustino Bocchi (Brescia 1659-1741) - Bambocciata
- Enrico Albricci (Vilminore di Scalve, BG 1714-Bergamo 1775) - Serenade by Bambocci
- Ponziano Loverini (Gandino, BG 1845-1929)
- Antonio Guadagnini (Esine, BS 1817-Arzago d'Adda, BG 1900)

== Bibliography ==
- Panazza, Gaetano; Araldo Bertolini (2004). Arte in Val Camonica - vol 5 (in Italian). Brescia: Industrie grafiche bresciane.
