= Sant'Antonio Abate, Breno =

Roman Catholic church in Breno, Italy

Coordinates: 45°57′18″N 10°18′04″E

Church of Saint Anthony Abbot (Sant'Antonio Abate)
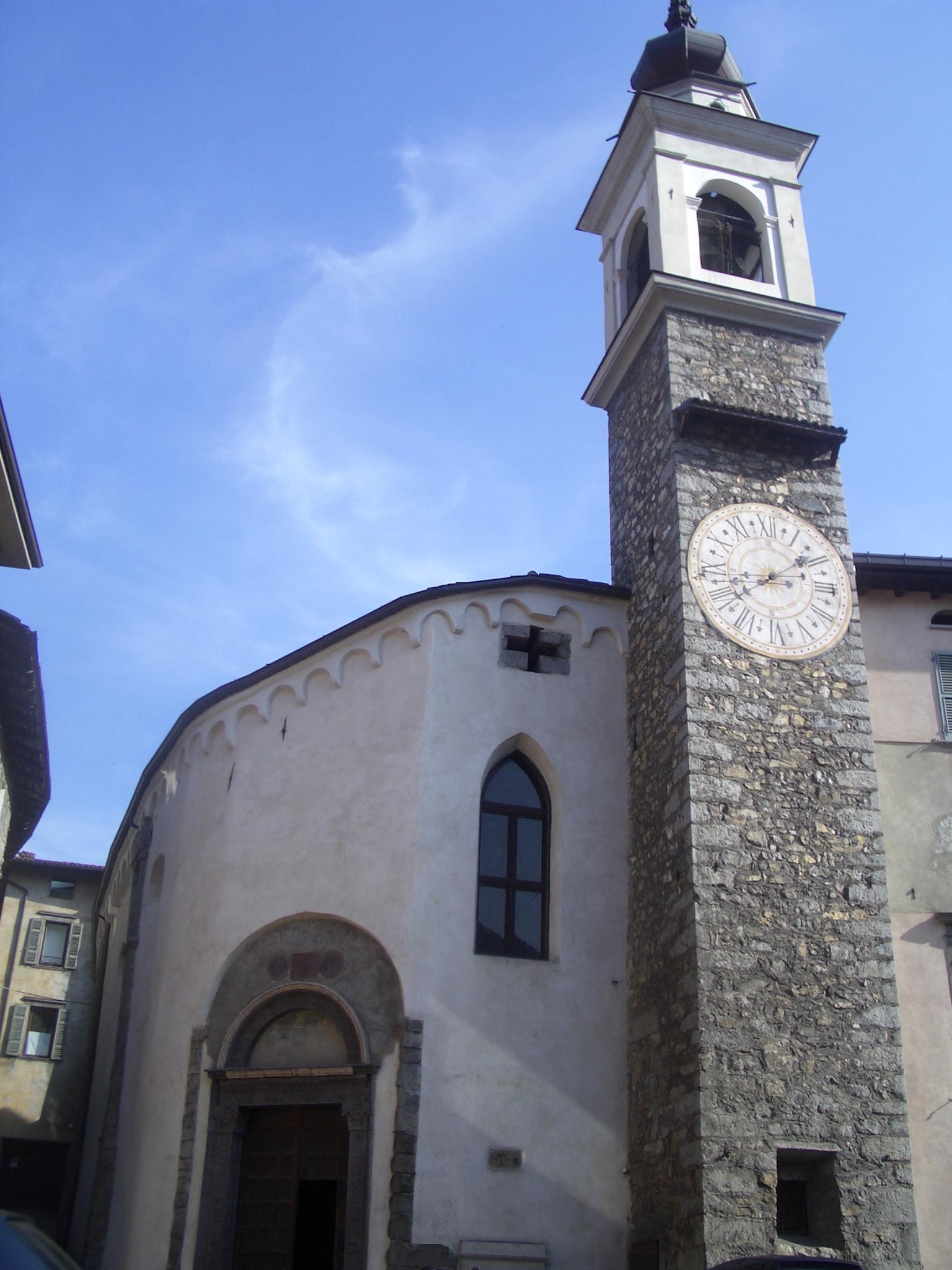
- Façade of the church.

Religion
- Affiliation: Roman Catholic
- Province: Brescia
- Ecclesiastical or organisational status: National monument
- Status: Not active

Location
- Location: Breno, Italy
- Interactive map of Church of Saint Anthony Abbot (Sant'Antonio Abate)

Architecture
- Type: Church
- Style: Romanesque

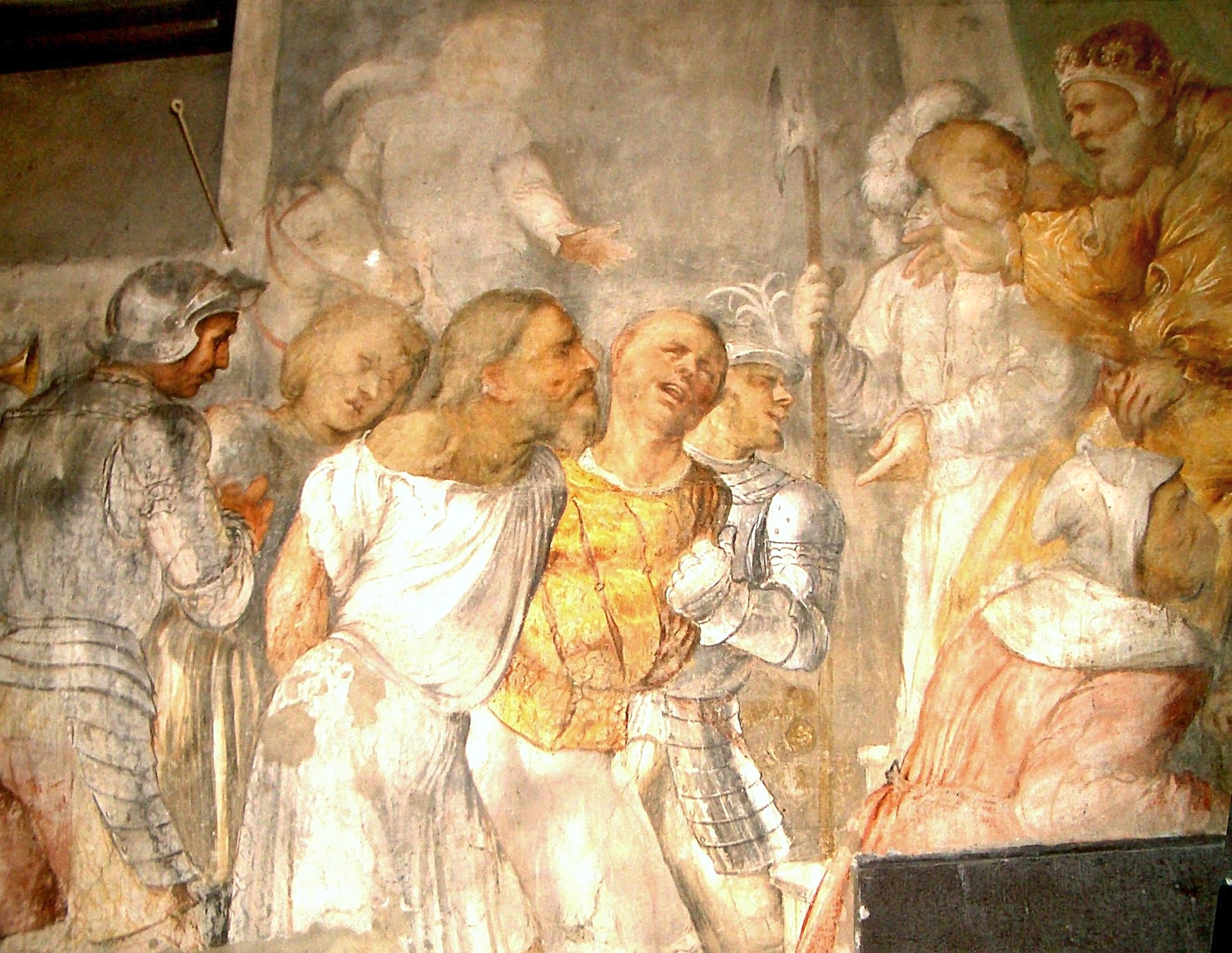
Frescos of Daniel dragged before Nebuchadnezzar (Right wall)

Church of Saint Anthony Abbot (Italian: Chiesa di Sant'Antonio Abate) is a Roman Catholic church in the town of Breno, in the province of Brescia, Lombardy, northern Italy.

The church contains fragments of Frescos on three walls around the chancel by Girolamo Romani in collaboration with Daniele Mori, who also worked with him in Pisogne and Bienno. These frescos of scenes from the "Book of Daniel" are inspired by the grotesque and anti-classical artististic expression that pervades strongly in Valcamonica.

== See also ==
- Girolamo Romani
