= Sanctuary of Minerva =

Roman temple in Breno, Italy

Coordinates: 45°57′15.4″N 10°17′5.6″E

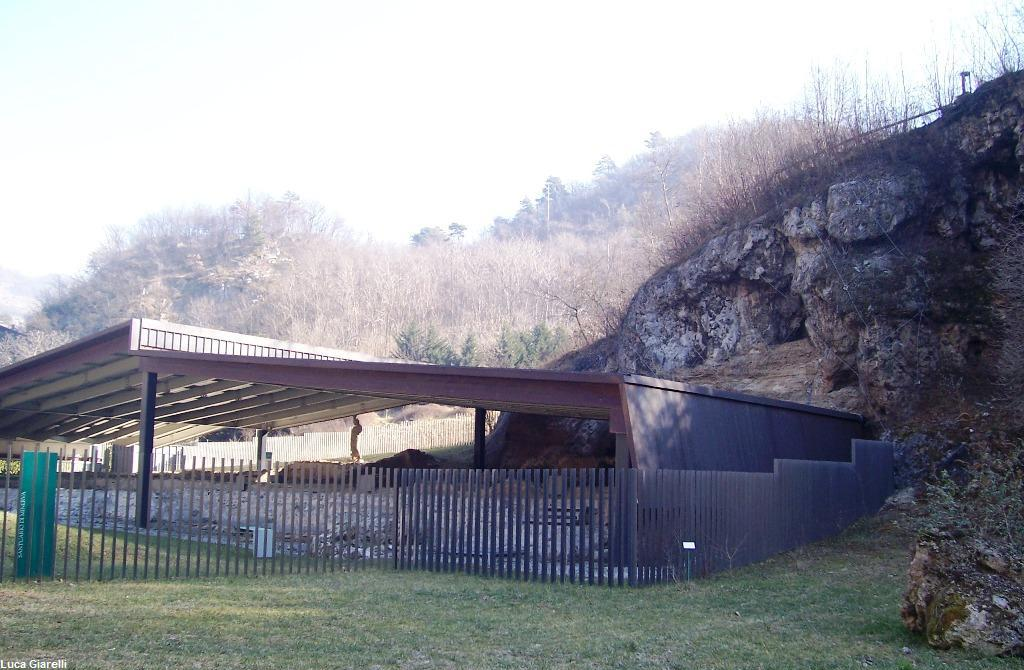
- Established: 2007
- Location: Loc. Spinera, Breno, Italy
- Type: Roman temple, Historic site
- Website: www.civitascamunnorum.com

The Sanctuary of Minerva is a temple of the Roman era, situated at Breno, in locality Spinera. It rises to a rocky outcrop on the banks of the river Oglio, faced with a natural cave within which flowed a spring.

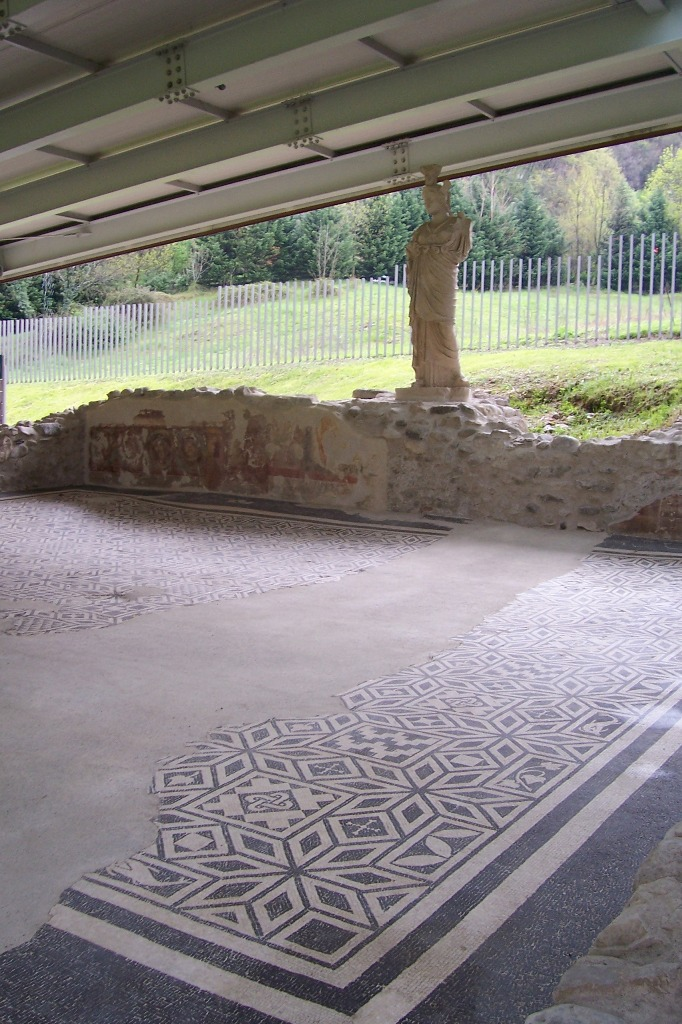
The sanctuary and the statue of Minerva.

== History ==
The site was already a place of worship since the Iron Age and had a shrine (which were found a few yards of stone and a brandopferplatz) that is a paved area that housed the burning rituals. Following the Romanization of the camunian territory, on the former sanctuary was built, in the early first century, a Roman temple dedicated to the goddess Minerva.

The Roman final structure, built next to the indigenous, consisted of a row of rooms assigned to the rock and the sides by two wings that porticoed heading for the river delimiting the courtyard of the temple. The main hall housed in an elevated niche, the statue of Minerva, Roman copy of a Greek statue of the fifth century BC

In the fourth century started the process of Christianization of Valle Camonica that imposed the end of the cult of Minerva during the persecution of pagans in the late Roman Empire. Into the fifth century the sanctuary was destroyed by a violent fire, and the statue of Minerva was beheaded with force.

Later, during the thirteenth century, a flood of the Oglio river covered the area in debris and the site was finally abandoned.

== Discovery ==
The existence of the temple was largely forgotten with time following the Christianization of Valcamonica, although some collective memory of the temple survived among locals, with a nearby bridge being referred to as ponte di Minerva (the bridge of Minerva) and a nearby church, although dedicated to Virgin Mary, being colloquially referred to by locals as "The Church of Minerva." However, the temple's existence and the roots of the local nicknames for the nearby bridge and church were officially forgotten. The temple was rediscovered by chance in 1986 during an excavation for the laying of pipes.

Starting in 2004, it was the subject of a restoration which, together with the laying of coverage and implementation of information pathways, have turned into a museum that was opened to the public on 29 September 2007. In particular, for illustrative purposes, there was placed a copy of the statue of Minerva Hygeia, whose original is exhibited at the National Museum of Valcamonica of Cividate Camuno.

== Gallery ==
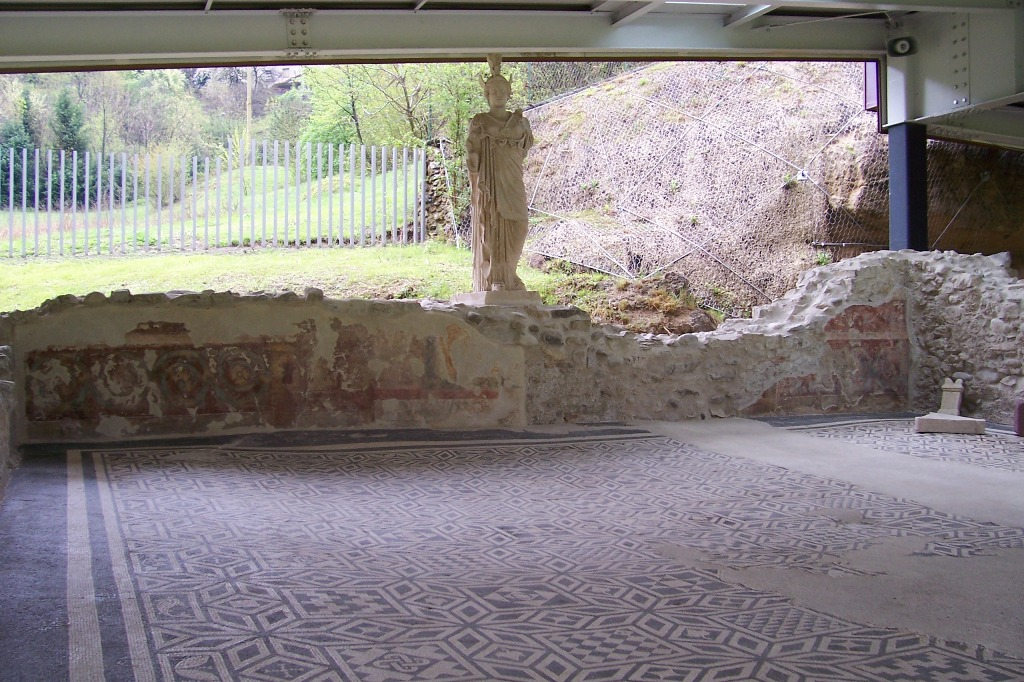
The main hall of the temple

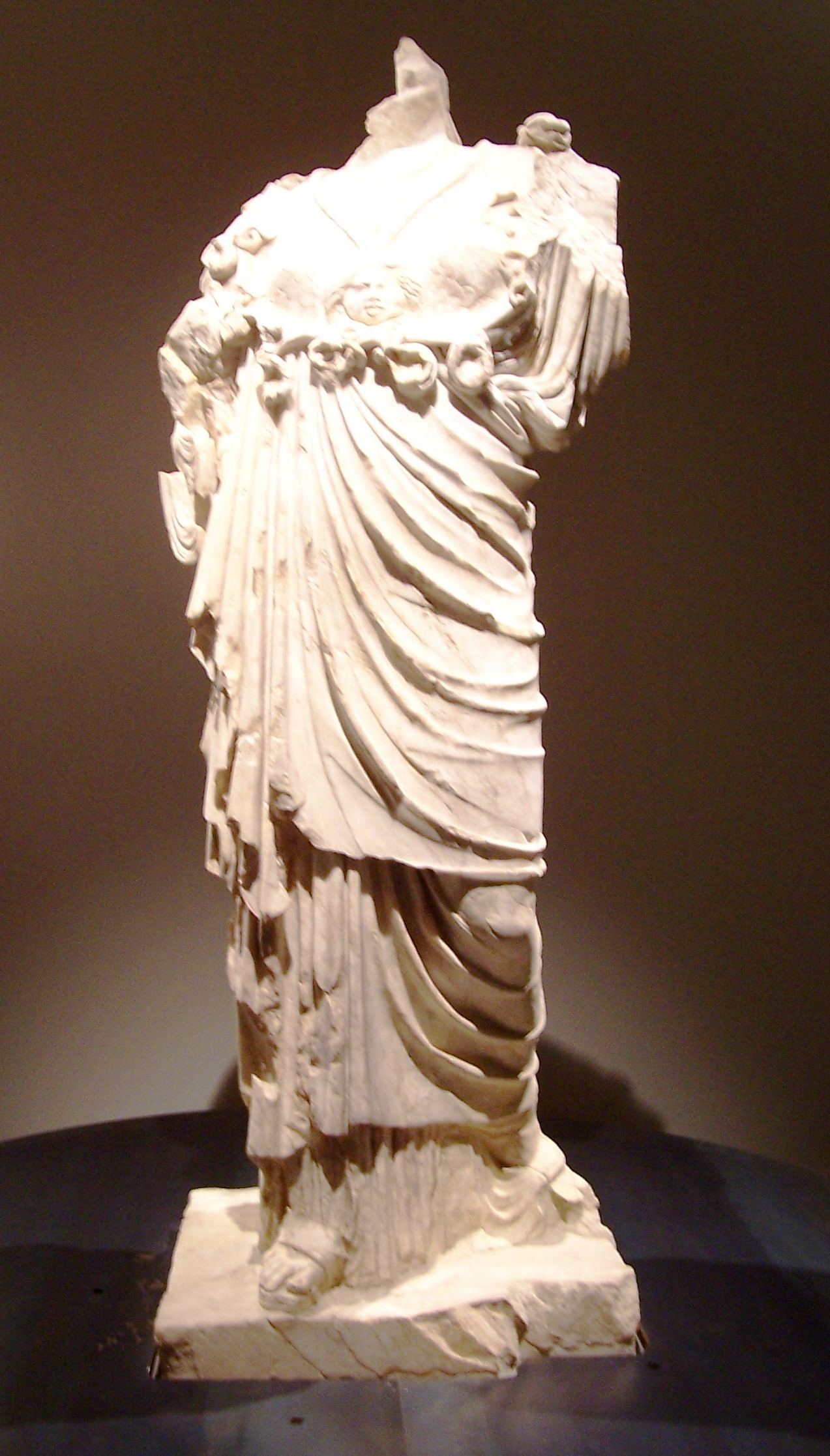
The statue of Minerva Hygeia, preserved in the National Museum of Valcamonica of Cividate Camuno

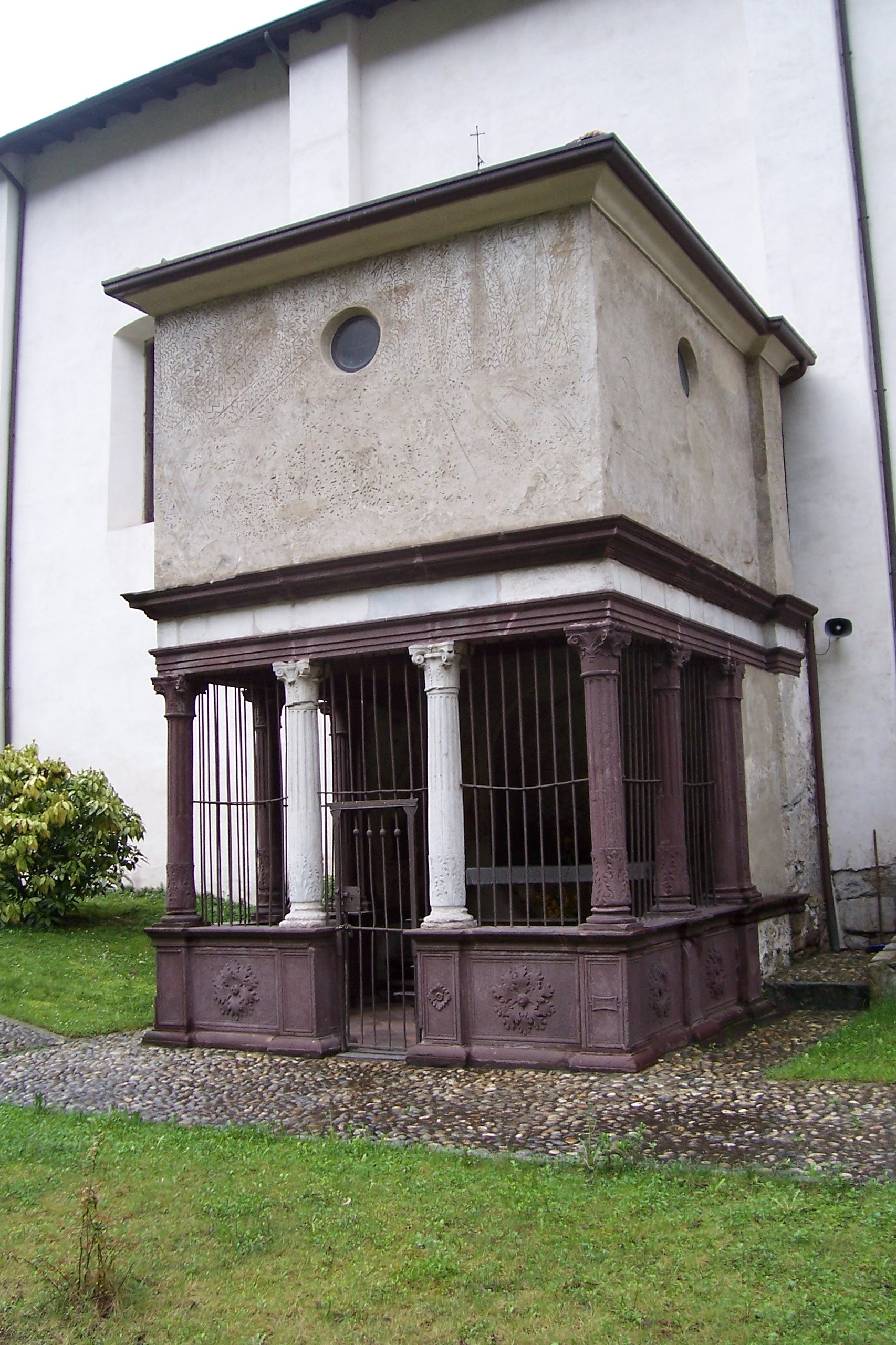
The church called "of Minerva", south of Breno, probably takes its name from the proximity to the temple

== See also ==
- List of Ancient Roman temples
- Camunni
- Civitas Camunnorum
- Breno
