= Gaspare Diziani =

Italian painter (1689–1767)

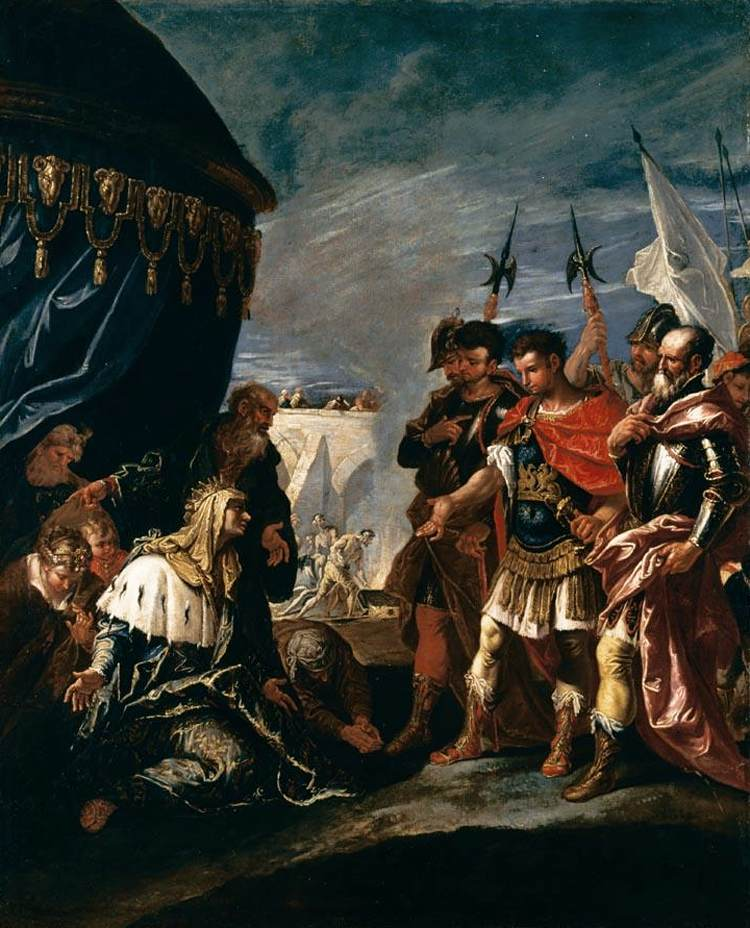
Gaspare Diziani, The Family of Darius before Alexander the Great, 1740

Gaspare Diziani (1689 – 17 August 1767) was an Italian painter of the late-Baroque or Roccoco period, active mainly in the Republic of Venice but also in Dresden and Munich. The artist's canvas is the largest painting of the Hermitage Museum in St. Petersburg.

== Biography ==
His earliest training was in his native town of Belluno with Antonio Lazzarini. He then moved to Venice, to the studio of Gregorio Lazzarini and later that of Sebastiano Ricci. His career largely overlapped with Lazzarini and Ricci's fellow pupil, Giambattista Tiepolo, who was seven years his elder.

Between 1710 and 1720, he painted a group of eight pictures that included the Mary Magdalene for the church of Santo Stefano in Belluno, and Entry into Jerusalem for San Teodoro in Venice. He also painted three frescoes on the Life of Saint Helena in the Scuola del Vin next to the church of San Silvestro. Diziani's celerity and technical assurance are evident from preparatory oil sketches, where color has been applied in rapid and spirited strokes.

He also worked as a scenery painter for the theater and opera in Venice, Munich (1717), and later in Dresden, in conjunction with Alessandro Mauro. Diziani was invited to Rome by Cardinal Ottoboni in 1726, to paint a "magnificent decoration for the church of San Lorenzo in Damaso". This work is now known only through an engraving by Claude Vasconi.

The Sala dei Pastelli in Ca' Rezzonico has a sotto in su allegorical ceiling fresco of The Triumph of Poetry (Poetry surrounded by Painting, Architecture, Music and Sculpture).

Selected Works

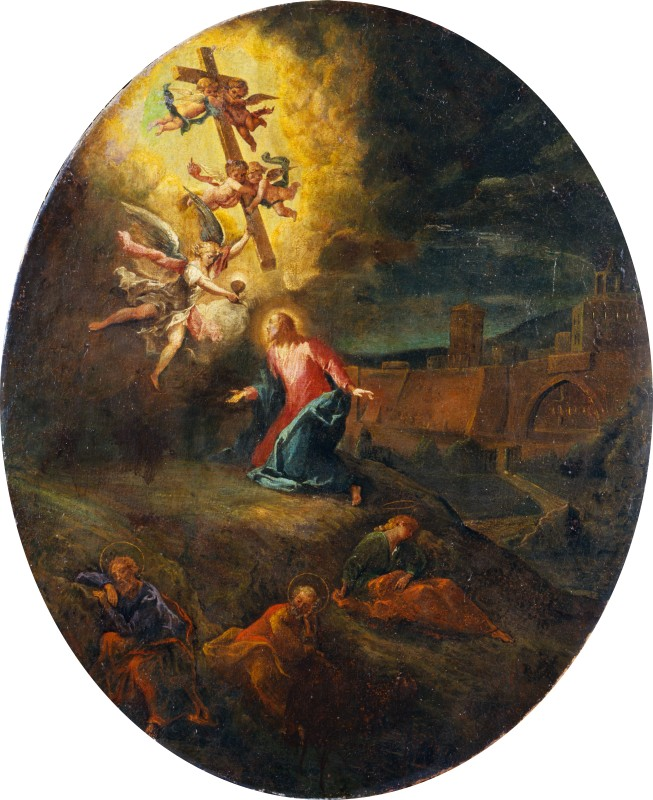
Getsemani

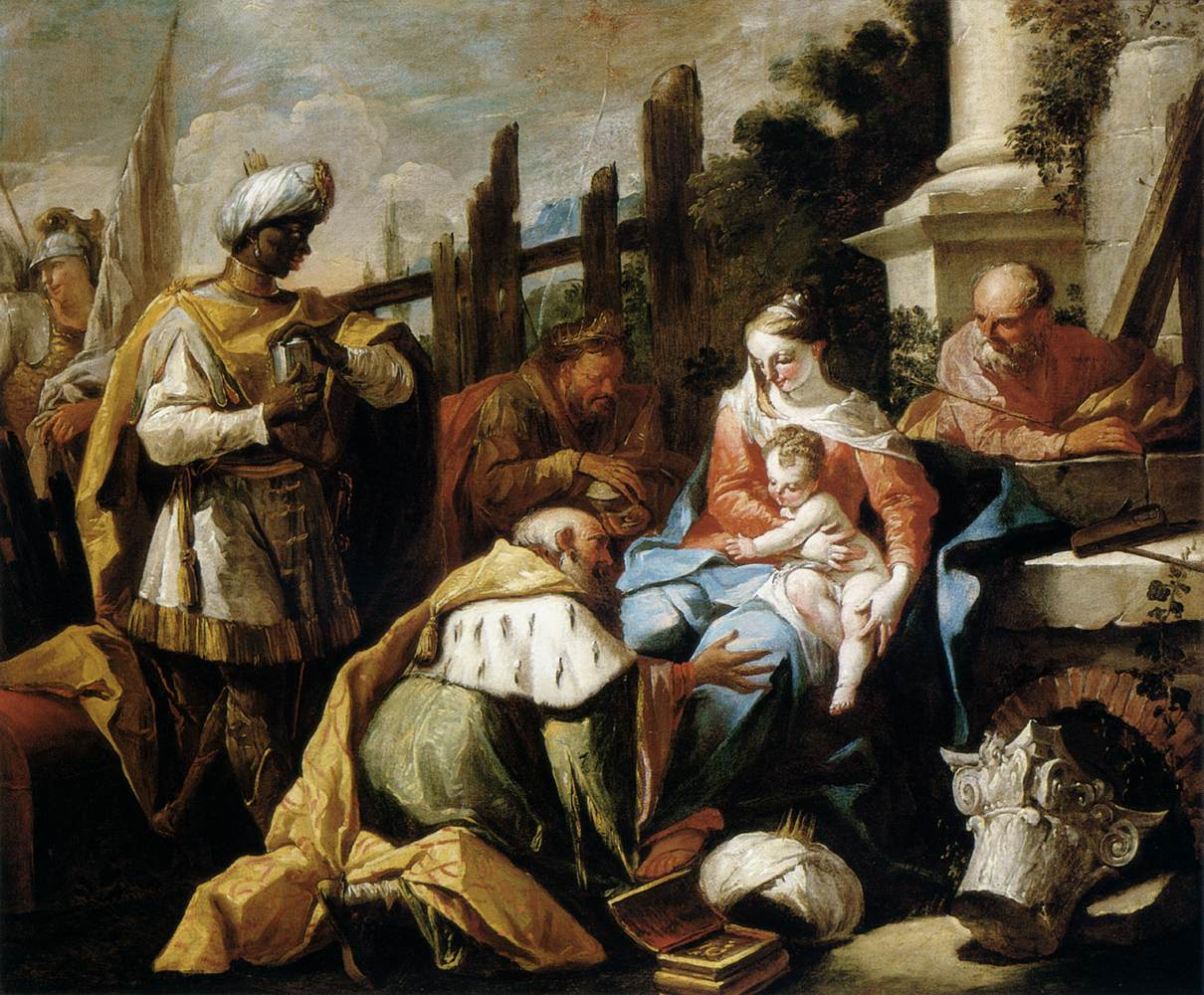
Adoration of the Magi

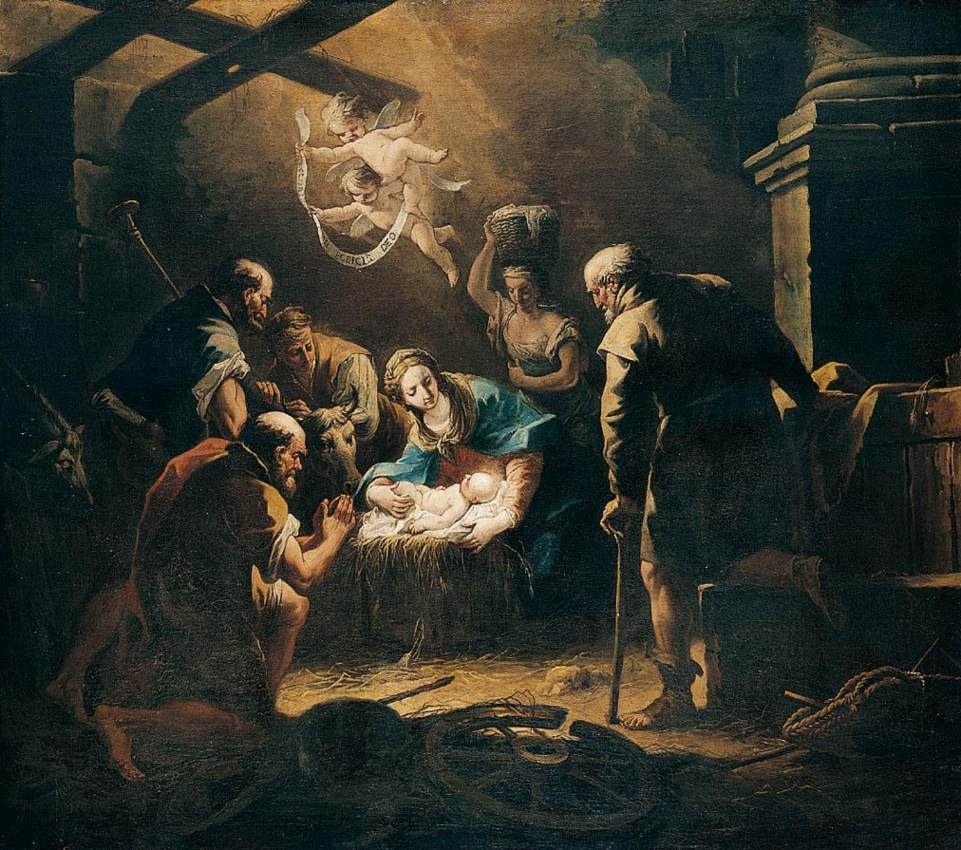
Adoration of the Shepherds

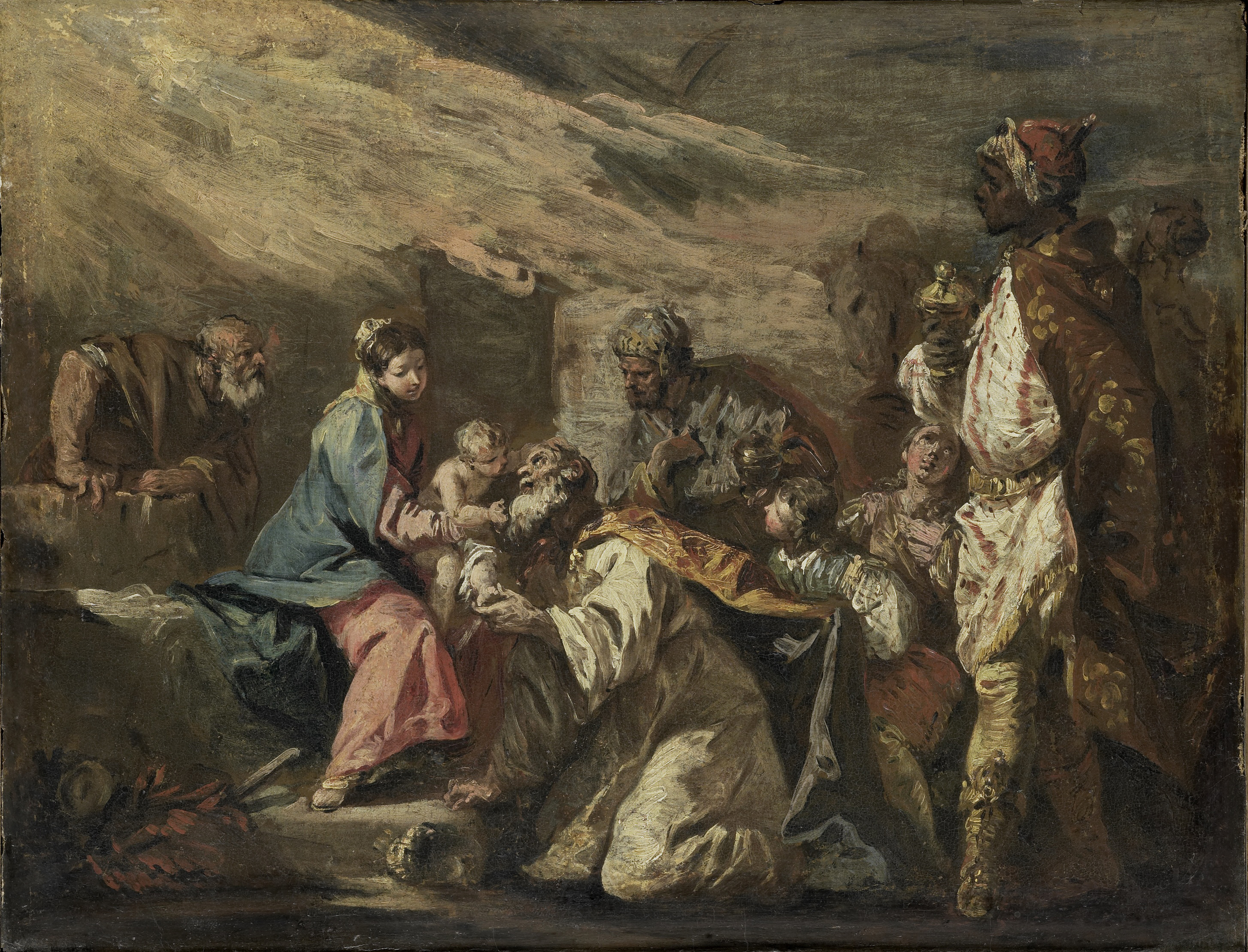
Adoration of the Magi (Rijksmuseum, Amsterdam)

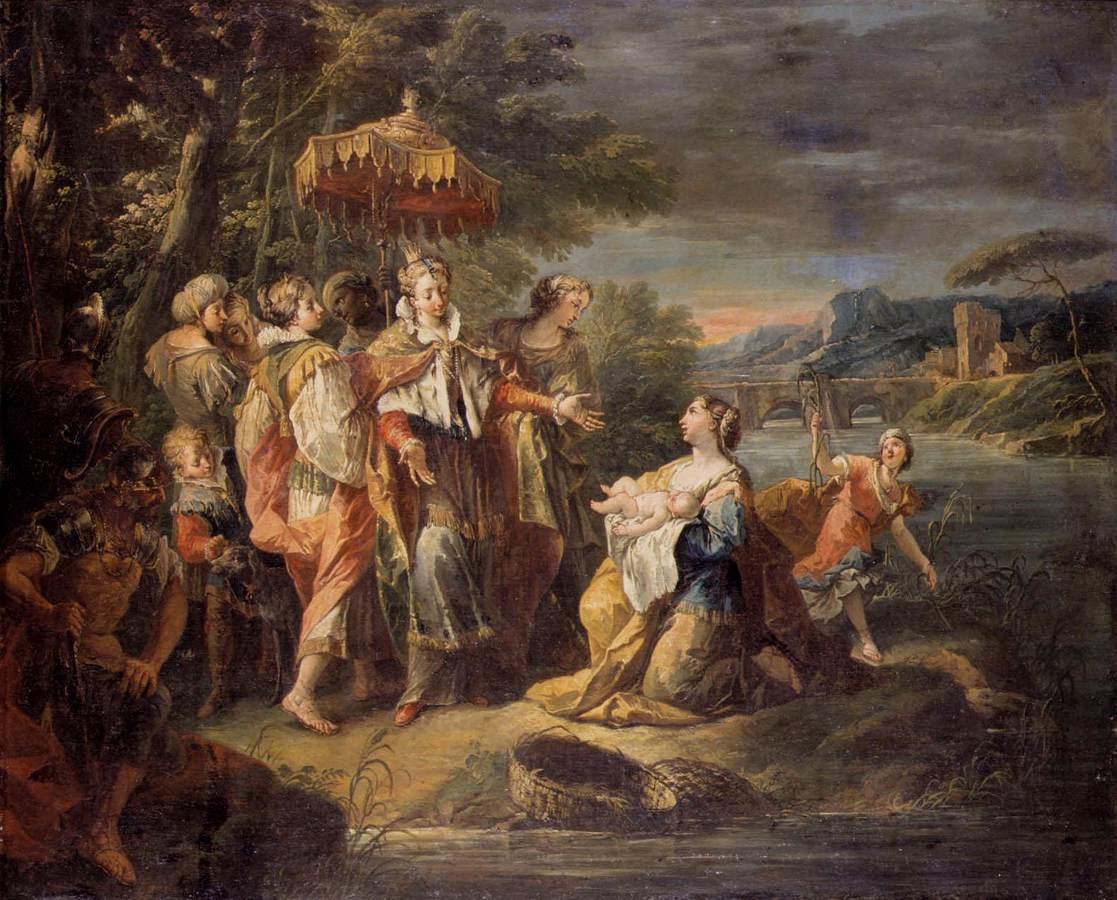
Finding Moses

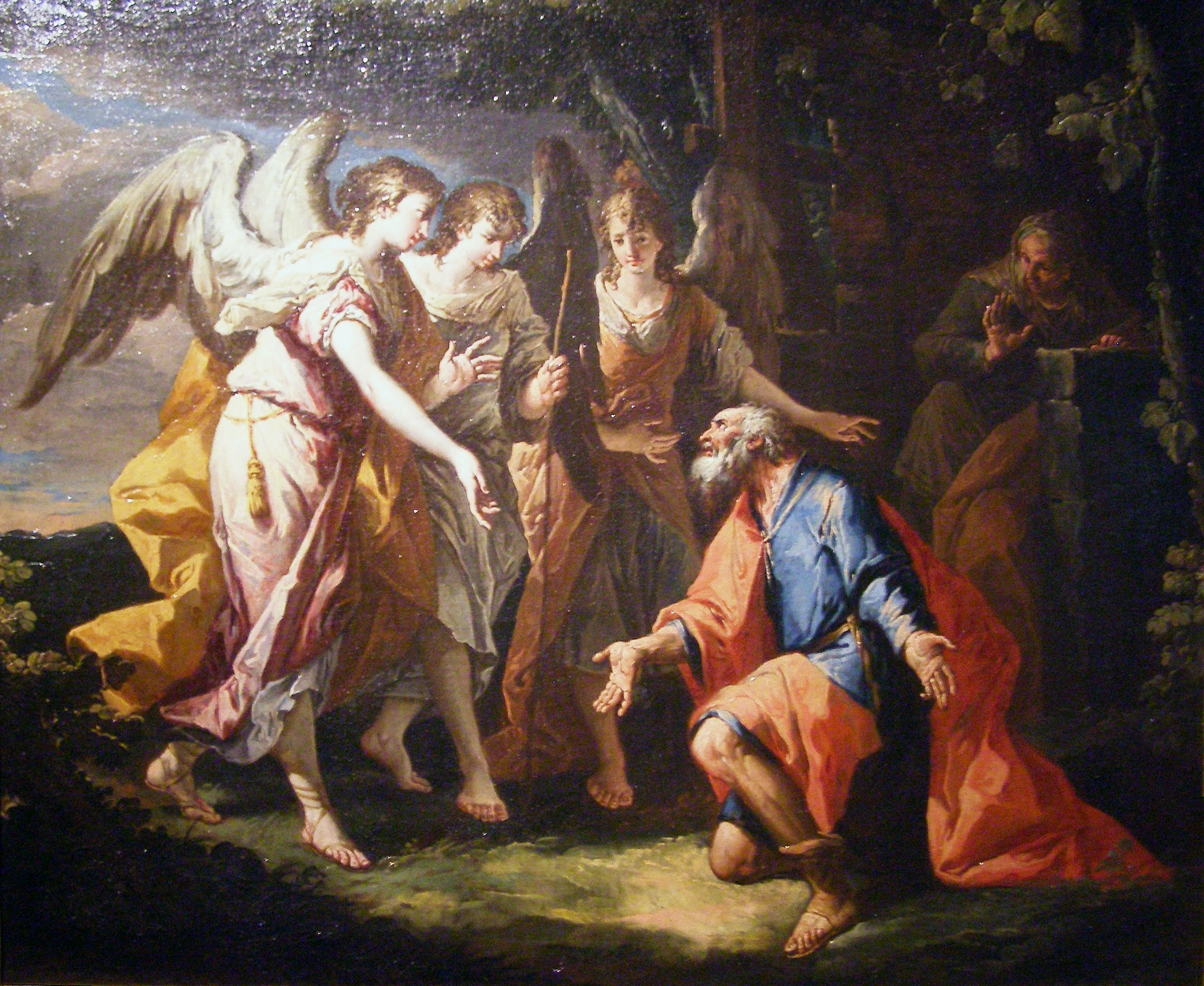
Abraham & Angels

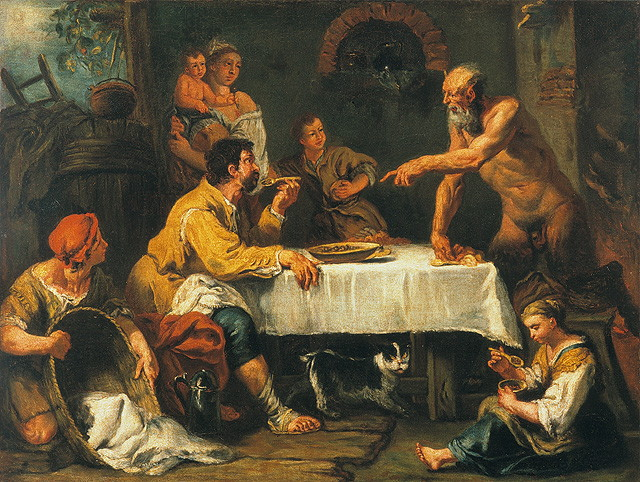
Satyr & Peasant

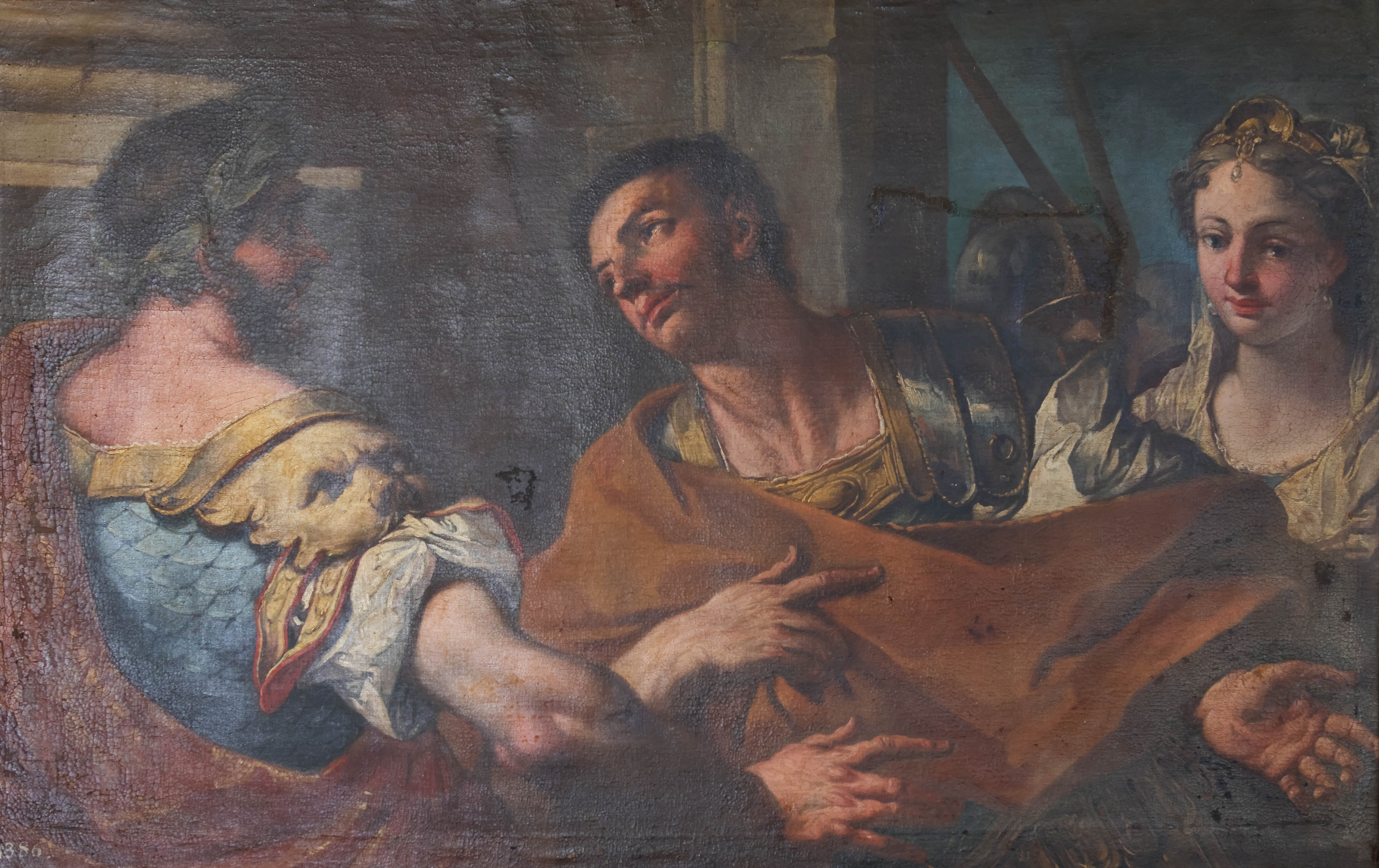
Timoclea before Alexander the Great

== Legacy ==
Both Tiepolo and Diziani were prolific, although Diziani's commissions, especially the early ones, were more playful bedroom, small salon, and perishable scenographic decorations, works for private ornament while the more eminent Tiepolo was able to attract the more vast ceiling decorations encompassing devotional, mythologic, and allegorical topics beyond and above the quotidian. Diziani does show the influence of Tiepolo, although not the lightness of coloration that the latter had gained from the frescoes of Luca Giordano.

His pupils included Pietro Edwards and Jacopo Marieschi (1711–1794). His son, Antonio Diziani, painted interior and exterior vedute of mainly Venice. He died in Venice.

== Public works ==
Diziani's "The Sacrifice of Isaac" was displayed at the Muscarelle Museum of Art in an exhibition titled "Curators at Work III" from April 26, 2013 - June 23, 2013

== Other projects ==
Media related to Gaspare Diziani at Wikimedia Commons
