= Antonio Diziani =

Italian painter (1737–1797)

Antonio Diziani (9 February 1737 – 23 June 1797) was an Italian painter of the 18th century, active mainly in painting vedute or landscapes and vistas of Venice.

His father, Gaspare Diziani, was a prominent rococo artist who painted canvases and decorative frescoes, but Antonio was more strongly influenced by Francesco Zuccarelli and Giuseppe Zais. He was a contemporary of Canaletto. In 1774 he was elected a member of the Painting and Sculpture Academy in Venice.

== Gallery ==
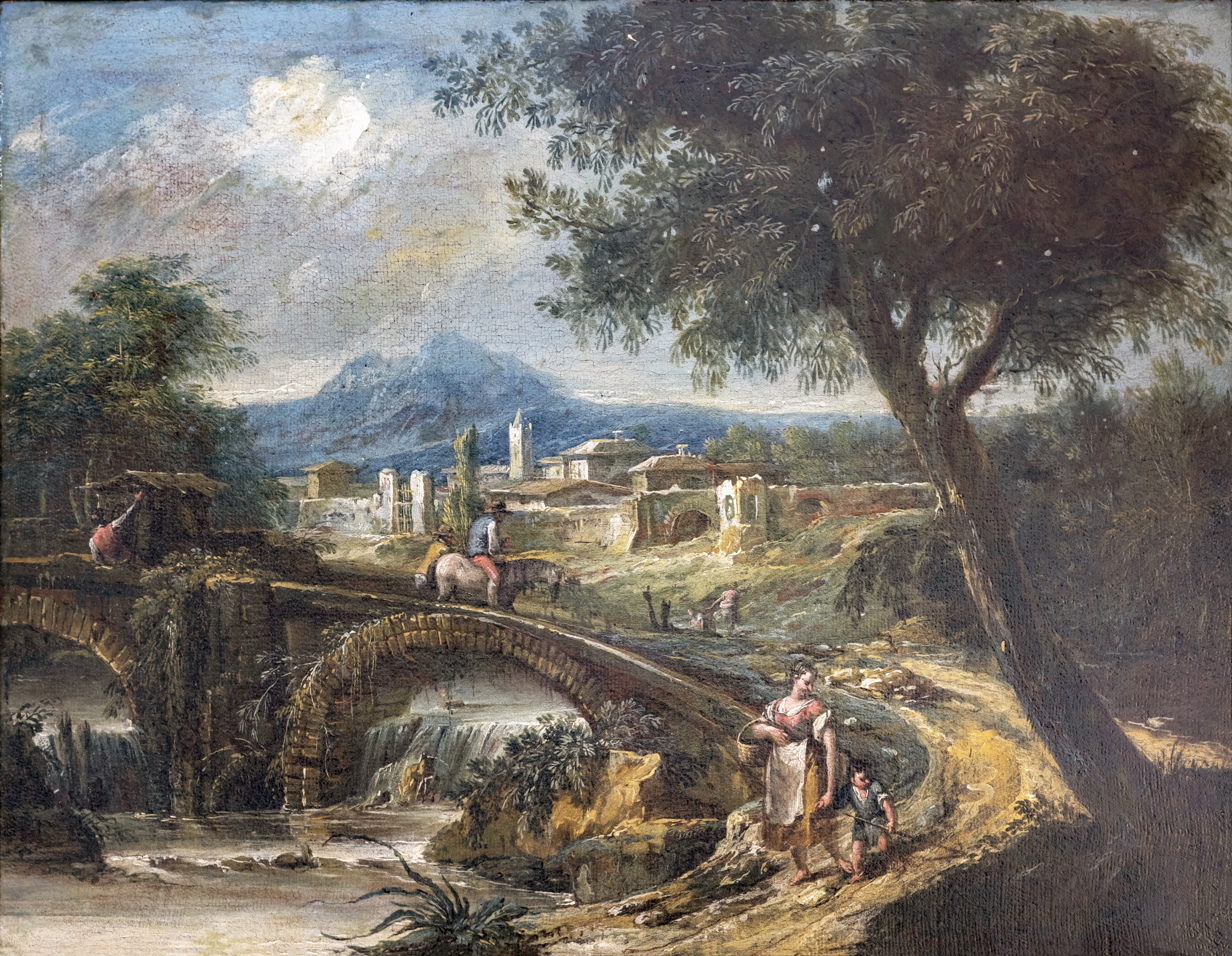
Landscape with Bridge Ca' Rezzonico

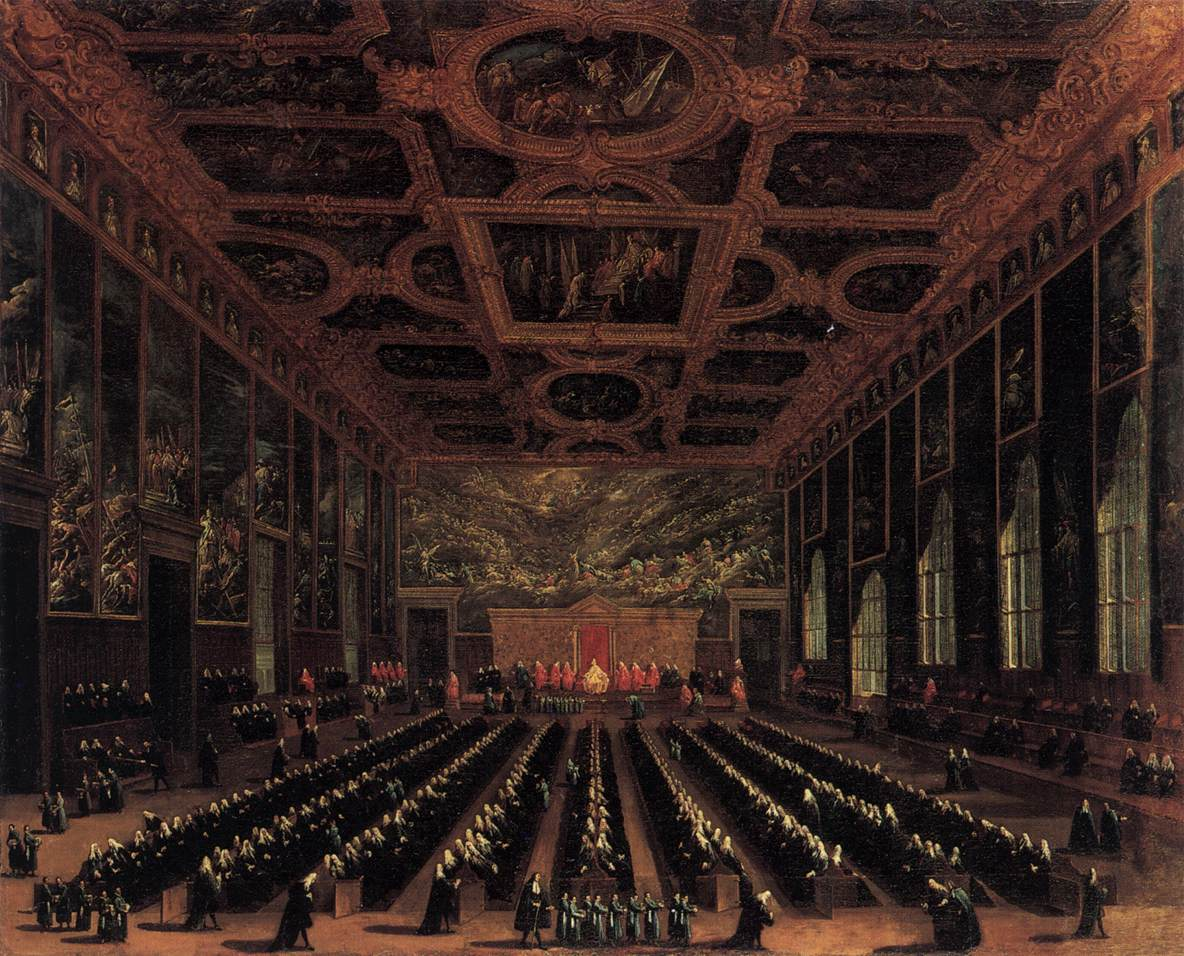
Hall of Consiglio Maggiore, Doge's Palace

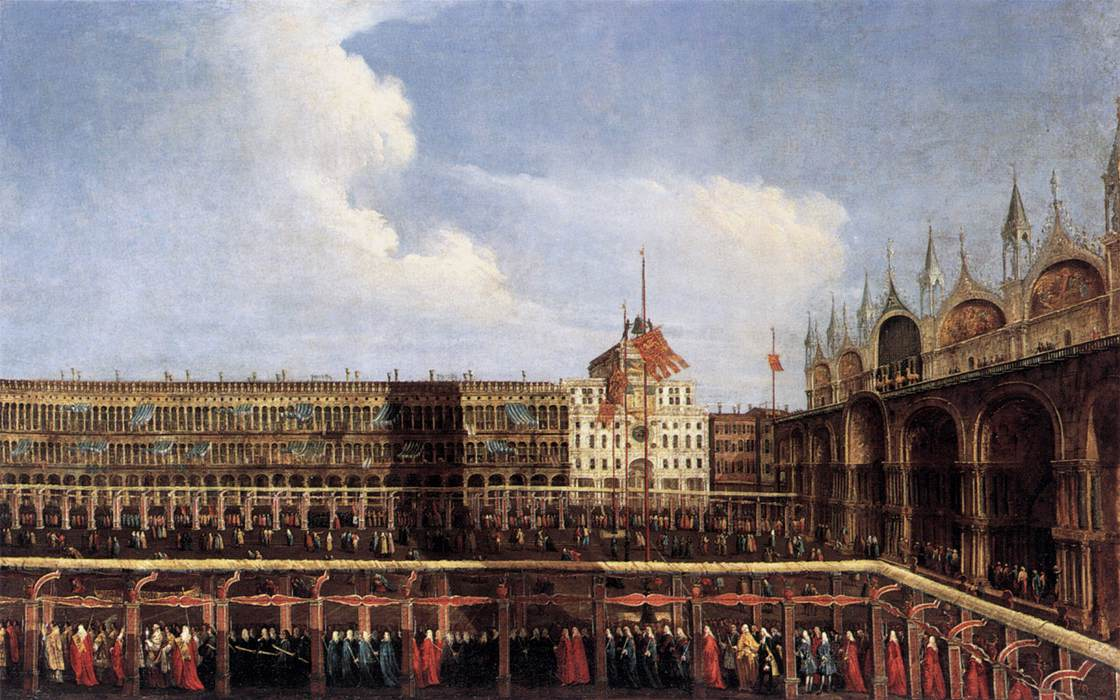
Corpus Christi procession, Piazza San Marco

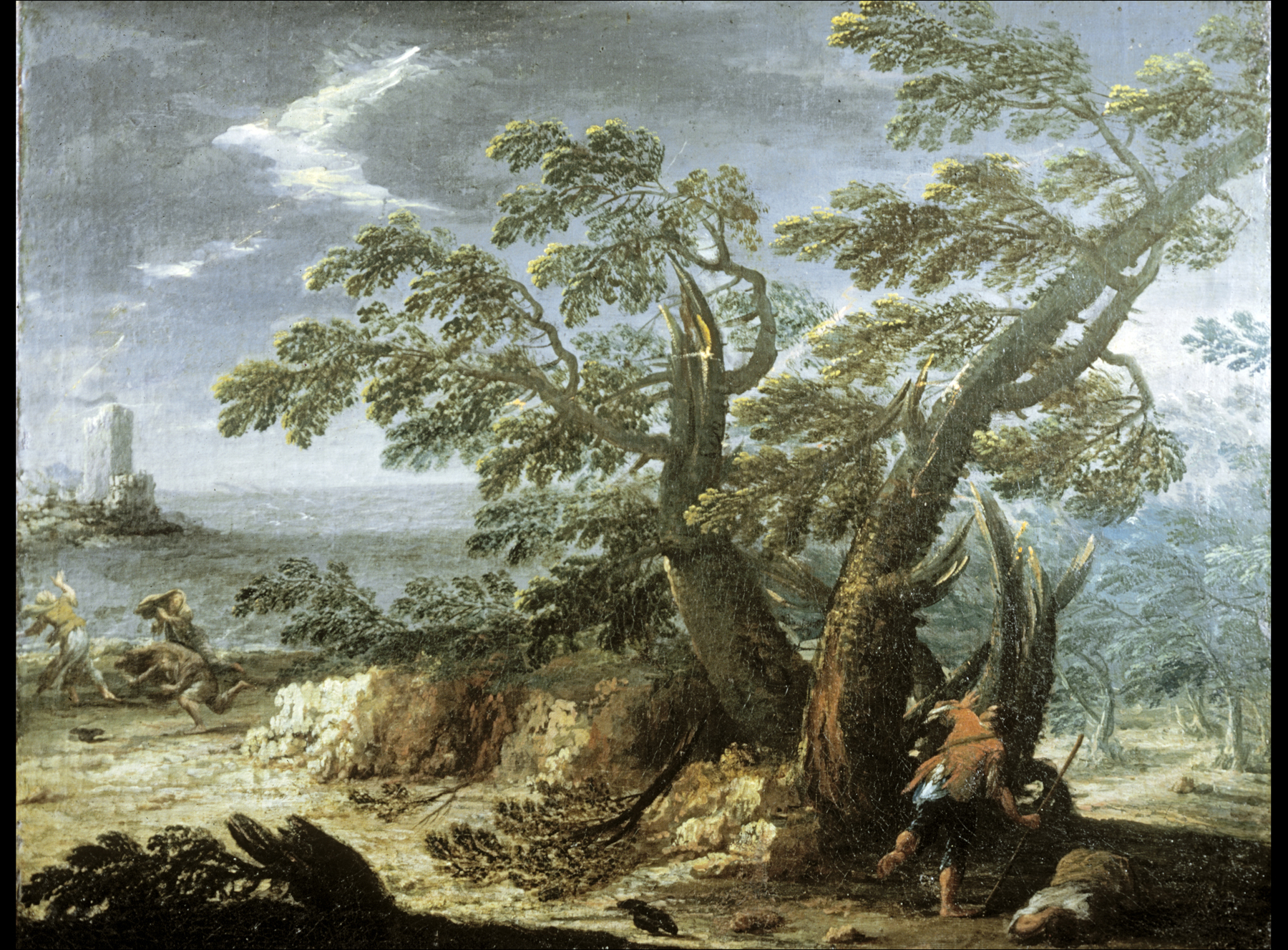
Landscape in Storm

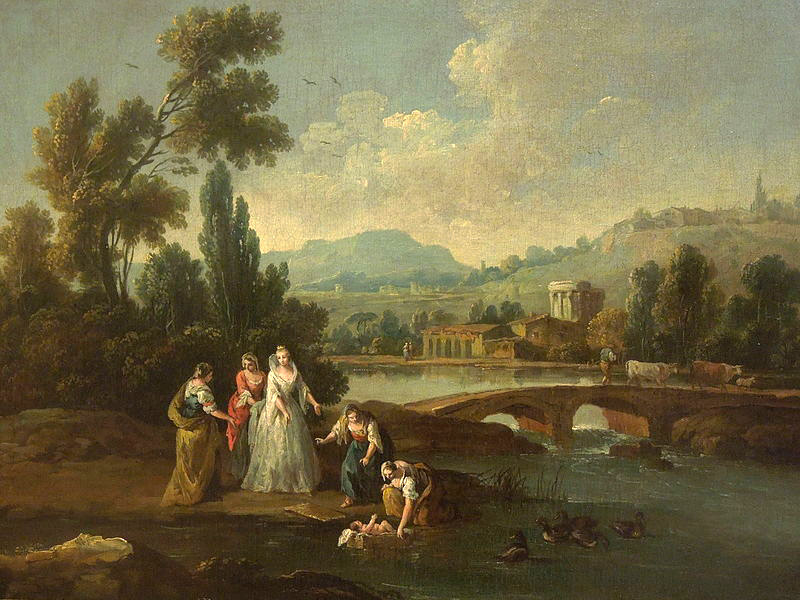
The Finding of Moses, 1770
