= Cividate Camuno =

Cividate Camuno Hiidà
- Comune
- Comune di Cividate Camuno
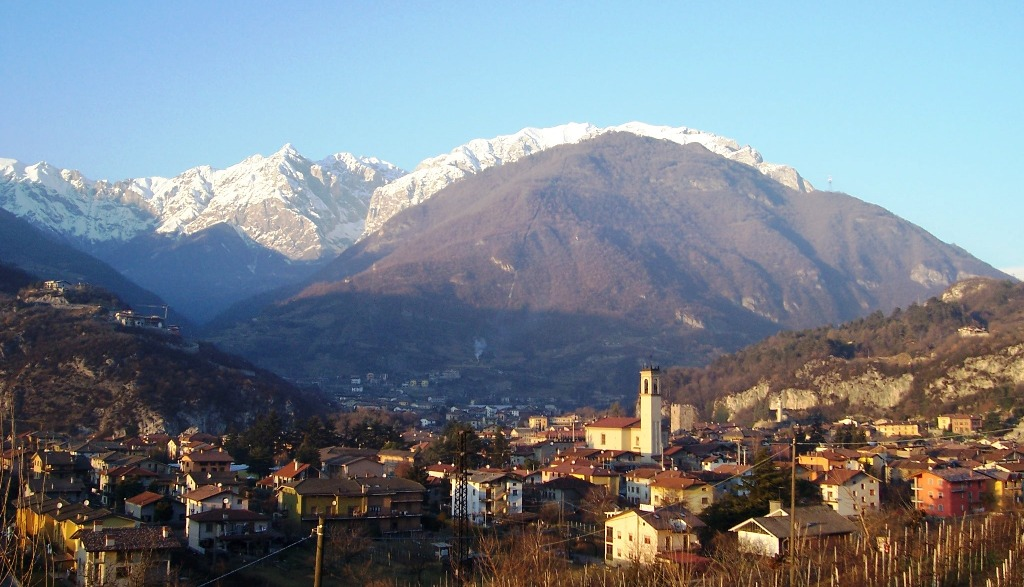

- Coat of arms

- Location within Italy Location within Lombardy
- Coordinates: 45°56′36″N 10°16′42″E
- Country: Italy
- Region: Lombardy
- Province: Brescia (BS)

Government
  - Mayor: Alessandro Francesetti

Area
  - Total: 3 km^{2} (1.2 sq mi)
- Elevation: 275 m (902 ft)

Population (31 May 2025)
  - Total: 2,662
  - Density: 890/km^{2} (2,300/sq mi)
- Demonym: Cividatesi
- Time zone: UTC+1 (CET)
  - Summer (DST): UTC+2 (CEST)
- Postal code: 25040
- Dialing code: 0364
- ISTAT code: 017055
- Patron saint: Saint Stephen
- Saint day: 26 December
- Website: Official website

Cividate Camuno (Camunian: Hiidà) is an Italian comune of 2,662 inhabitants (2025), in Val Camonica, province of Brescia, in Lombardy.

== Geography ==
The territory of Cividate Camuno is bordered by several municipalities: to the east Bienno, on the north Breno and Malegno, to the west Piancogno, and south Esine and Berzo Inferiore.

== History ==
Originally a Roman town, the Civitas Camunnorum, Cividate Camuno was known as Civethate in the medieval period.

Between 1863 and 1887 Cividate assumed the name "Cividate Alpino", but because of bureaucratic confusion, in 1887 the village re-took the name "Cividate Camuno".

It was a terminus of the former Lovere–Cividate Camuno Tramway.

== Main sights ==
The main tourist sights of Cividate Camuno are:

- Parish Church of Santa Maria Assunta, standing on the site of the baptismal chapel dedicated to St. John the Baptist, which was replaced after the 11th century by the Romanesque church.
- Church of Santo Stefano. Commanding the countryside, it is accessed by a ladder with four flights with no other possibility of approach (the ladder is dated 1770). Archaeological excavations have reported pre-Christian elements.
- Medieval tower of the 12th-13th century
- Renaissance gates
- Museo nazionale della Valcamonica
- The Roman park of the theatre and amphitheatre
Roman amphitheatre of Cividate Camuno

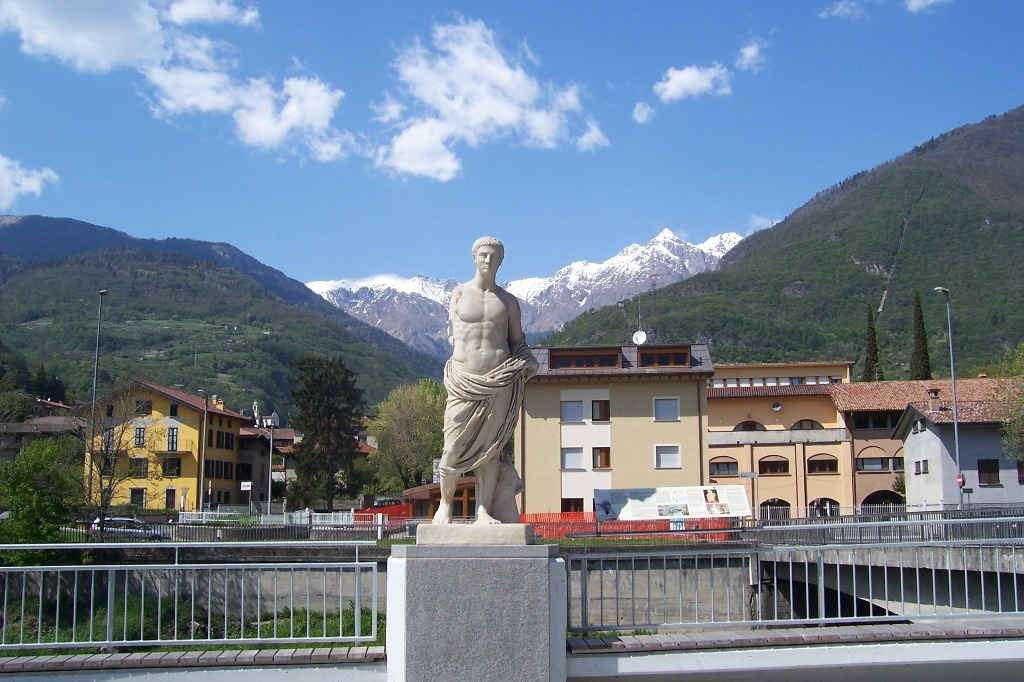
Copy of Roman statue in Cividate Camuno

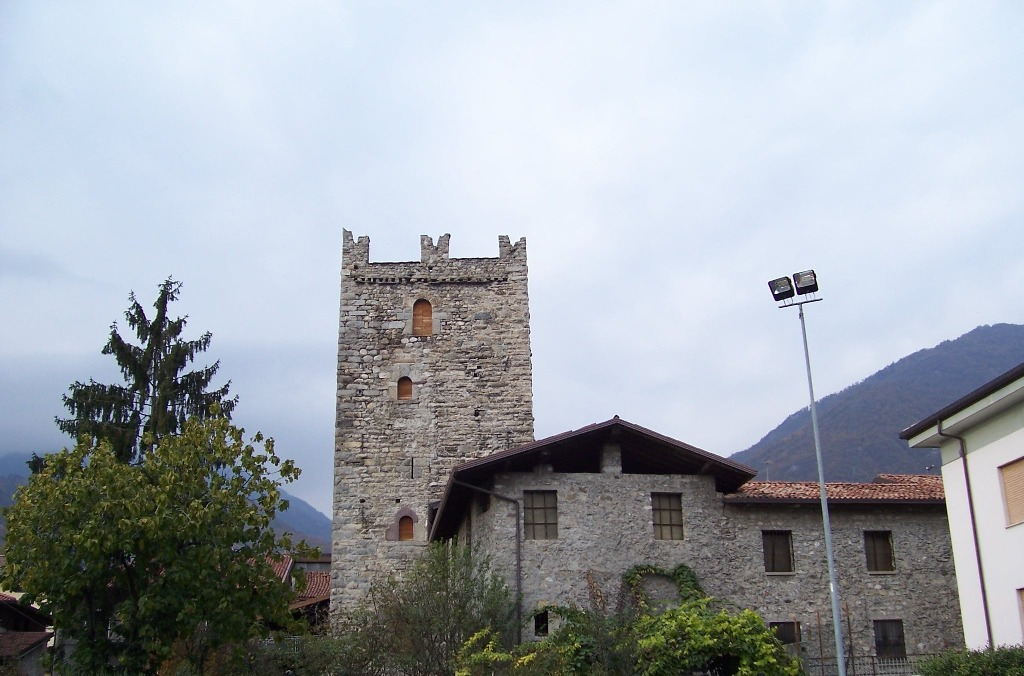
Tower of Cividate Camuno

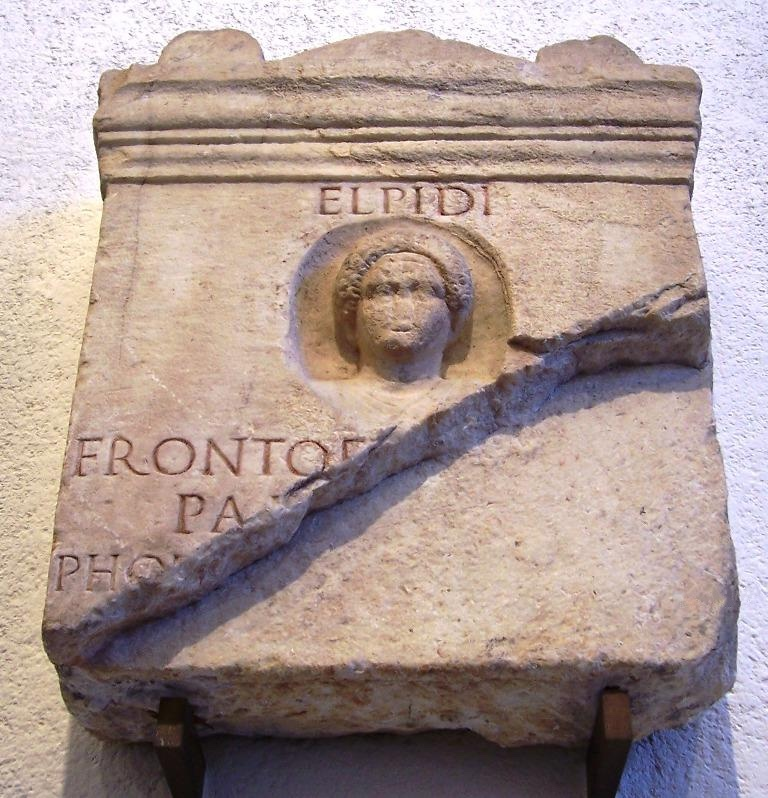
Stele di Cividate Camuno, Archaeological Museum of Bergamo

== Culture ==
The scütüm are in camunian dialect nicknames, sometimes personal, elsewhere showing the characteristic features of a community. The one which characterize the people of Cividate Camuno is Pàtate, Bö or Maia Hüche.

== People ==
- Blessed Giuseppe Tovini
- Blessed Mosè Tovini
